= List of frigate classes of the Royal Navy =

This is a list of frigate classes of the Royal Navy of the United Kingdom (and the individual ships composed within those classes) in chronological order from the formal creation of the Royal Navy following the Restoration in 1660. Where the word 'class' or 'group' is not shown, the vessel was a 'one-off' design with just that vessel completed to the design. The list excludes vessels captured from other navies and added to the Royal Navy.

All frigates built for the Royal Navy up to 1877 (when the Admiralty re-categorised all frigates and corvettes as "cruisers") are listed below. The term "frigate" was resuscitated in World War II and subsequent classes are listed at the end of this article, but the individual ships within those classes are not listed in this article.

== The frigate before 1660 ==
The initial meaning of frigate in English/British naval service was a fast sailing warship, usually with a relatively low superstructure and a high length:breadth ratio—as distinct from the heavily armed but slow "great ships" with high fore- and after-castles. The name originated at the end of the 16th century, the first "frigats" being generally small, fast-sailing craft, in particular those employed by Flemish privateers based on Dunkirk and Flushing. Subsequently, the term was applied to any vessel with these characteristics, even to a third-rate or fourth-rate ship of the line.

In this list, the term is restricted to fifth rates and sixth rates which did not form part of the battlefleet (i.e. were not ships of the line); many of the earliest ships described as English frigates, such as Constant Warwick of 1645, were third-rate or fourth-rate ships of the line and thus are not listed below. As the Royal Navy was not officially created until 1660, vessels from the preceding (Commonwealth) era are only included where they survived past 1660. Prizes taken from enemy naval forces and added to the Royal Navy are also excluded.

=== Fifth-rates before 1660 ===
Prior to 1626 when the rating system was established, these vessels were known as pinnaces. The vessels were considered too lightly armed and built to stand in the line of battle. Fifth rates were essentially two-decked vessels, with a demi-battery on the lower deck and a lesser number of guns of lesser power on the upper deck (as well as even smaller guns on the quarterdeck).

- 1651 Programme Group
  - Pearl
  - Mermaid
  - Primrose
  - Nightingale
- Vessels of 1653–1656 Programmes:
  - Colchester – launched 23 February 1654
  - Islip– launched 25 March 1654 (wrecked 24 July 1655)
  - Fagons – launched 22 May 1654, renamed HMS Milford in 1660
  - Selby – launched 22 April 1654, renamed HMS Eagle in 1660
  - Basing – launched 26 April 1654, renamed HMS Guernsey in 1660
  - Grantham – launched 1654, renamed HMS Garland in 1660
  - Norwich – launched 11 September 1655
  - Pembroke – launched September 1655
  - Dartmouth – launched 22 September 1655
  - Cheriton – launched 16 April 1656, renamed HMS Speedwell in 1660
  - Wakefield – launched November 1656, renamed HMS Richmond in 1660
  - Oxford – launched November 1656
  - Forrester – launched 3 September 1657
  - Bradford – launched March 1658, renamed HMS Success in 1660

=== Sixth-rate frigates before 1660 ===
Sixth rates were single-decked vessels, with a battery on the (single) gun deck, and usually some lesser guns on the quarterdeck.

- Vessels of 1651 Programme:
  - Drake – launched 1652
  - Merlin – launched 1652
  - Martin – launched 1652

== Frigates from 1660 to 1688 ==
=== Fifth-rate frigates from 1660 to 1688 ===
Charles Galley was an early galley-frigate with a bank of sweeps above the waterline, the last of these types (Royal Anne Galley) being launched in 1709.

- Vessels of 1665 Programme:
  - Little Victory – launched 1665
  - Sweepstakes – launched 21 March 1666
  - Falcon – launched 1666
- Vessels of 1668–1669 Programmes:
  - Nonsuch – launched 22 December 1668
  - Phoenix – launched 31 March 1671
- Vessels of 1670s construction:
  - Rose – launched September 1674
  - Sapphire – launched 29 June 1675
  - Charles Galley – 32 guns, launched 1676, rebuilt 1693, renamed HMS Torrington in 1729 after two further rebuilds

=== Sixth-rate frigates from 1660 to 1688 ===
- Designed and built by Anthony Deane at Harwich
  - Fanfan – launched July 1666
  - Roebuck – launched 24 July 1666
  - Francis – launched 1666
- Designed and built by Anthony Deane at Portsmouth
  - Saudadoes – launched 28 October 1669
  - Greyhound – launched July 1672
- Designed and built by Sir Anthony Deane at Blackwall
  - Larke – launched 11 June 1675

== Frigates from 1688 to 1719 ==
For ships before the 1745 Establishment, the term 'class' is inappropriate as individual design was left up to the master shipwright in each Royal dockyard. For other vessels, the Surveyor of the Navy produced a common design for ships which were to be built under a commercial contract rather than in a Royal Dockyard. Consequently, the term 'group' is used as more applicable for ships built to similar specifications (and to the same principal dimensions) but to varying designs.

=== Fifth rates from 1688 to 1719 ===
- Mermaid (1660)
- 1689 Programme Group – 32-gun fifth rates 1689–1691
  - Experiment (1689)
  - Pembroke (1690)
  - Milford (1690)
  - Portsmouth (1690)
  - Sheerness (1691)
- Adventure (1646) ex-fourth rate rebuilt 1691 as a fifth rate – 40 guns
- HMS England (1693) purchased 1693 – 40 guns.
- HMS Charles Galley – 32 guns, launched 1676, rebuilt 1693, renamed Torrington in 1727 after two more rebuilds
- 1693 Programme Group – 32-gun fifth rates 1694
  - HMS Shoreham 1694
  - HMS Scarborough 1694
  - HMS Sorlings 1694
  - HMS Winchelsea 1694
- 1694 Programme Group – 32-gun fifth rates 1695–1698
  - HMS Lyme 1695
  - HMS Hastings (i) 1695
  - HMS Milford 1695
  - HMS Arundel 1695
  - HMS Rye 1696
  - HMS Scarborough 1696
  - HMS Looe (i) 1696
  - HMS Lynn 1696
  - HMS Fowey 1696
  - HMS Southsea Castle (i) 1696
  - HMS Gosport 1696
  - HMS Poole 1696
  - HMS Feversham 1696
  - HMS Hastings (ii) 1698
  - HMS Lowestoffe 1697
  - HMS Looe (ii) 1697
  - HMS Southsea Castle (ii) 1697
  - HMS Bridgewater 1698
  - HMS Ludlow 1698
- Betty (1695) - purchased 1695 - 36 guns
- Kinsale (1700) - only ship of Royal Navy built at Kinsale, Ireland
- Tartar Group 1702-1703
  - HMS Tartar 1702
  - HMS Falcon 1704
  - HMS Fowey 1705
- Lark group – 42-gun two-decked Fifth rates 1703–1706
  - HMS Hector 1703
  - HMS Lark 1703
  - HMS Greyhound 1703
  - HMS Garland 1703
  - HMS Folkestone 1703
  - HMS Roebuck 1704 (40 guns only)
  - HMS Sorlings 1706
- 1706 Establishment group – 42-gun fifth rates 1707–1715
- The Navy Board ordered sixteen of these vessels between 1705 and 1711 as 42-gun vessels. The remaining pair—Looe and Diamond—were not ordered but rather the Navy Board purchased them on the stocks from the shipbuilder who had commenced building them "on spec". All the vessels were armed under the 1703 Guns Establishment with a main battery of nine-pounder guns. Under the 1716 Guns Establishment, a 40-gun ship with a main battery of 12-pounder guns superseded the 42-gun ship. Hence, the last six of the ships listed below were completed as 40-gun ships.
  - HMS Ludlow Castle 1707 – broken up 1721
  - HMS Gosport 1707 – broken up 1735
  - HMS Portsmouth 1707 – broken up 1728
  - HMS Hastings 1707 – sold for breaking 1745
  - HMS Looe 1707 – sunk as a breakwater 1737
  - HMS Diamond 1708 – broken up 1721 to rebuild
  - HMS Sapphire 1708 – sold for breaking 1745
  - HMS Enterprize 1709 – sold for breaking 1749
  - HMS Pearl 1708 – broken up 1723 to rebuild
  - HMS Southsea Castle 1708 – broken up 1723 to rebuild
  - HMS Adventure 1709 – broken up 1724 to rebuild
  - HMS Mary Galley 1708 – broken up 1721 to rebuild
  - HMS Fowey 1709 – renamed Queenborough 1744, sold for breaking 1746
  - HMS Royal Anne Galley 1709 – wrecked 1721
  - HMS Charles Galley – launched 1676, rebuilt 1693 and 1710 – renamed Torrington 1729, broken up 1744
  - HMS Launceston 1711 – broken up 1726 to rebuild
  - HMS Faversham 1712 – broken up 1730 to rebuild
  - HMS Lynn 1715 – broken up 1732

=== Sixth-rate frigates from 1688 to 1719 ===
Before the "true" sail frigate came into being in the 1740s, the equivalent was the single-deck cruising vessel of the sixth rate, armed with either 20, 22 or 24 guns, which established itself in the 1690s and lasted until the arrival of the new "true" frigates. Before 1714, many small sixth rates carried fewer than 20 guns, and these have been excluded from this list. For over half a century from the 1690s, the main armament of this type was the 6-pounder gun, until it was replaced by nine-pounder guns just prior to being superseded by the 28-gun sixth-rate frigate.

- Maidstone Group 24-gun sixth rates 1693–1697
  - HMS Maidstone 1693
  - HMS Jersey 1694
  - HMS Lizard (i) 1694
  - HMS Newport 1694
  - HMS Falcon 1694
  - HMS Queenborough 1694
  - HMS Swan 1694
  - HMS Drake 1694
  - HMS Solebay 1694
  - HMS Seahorse 1694
  - HMS Bideford 1695
  - HMS Penzance 1695
  - HMS Dunwich 1695
  - Orford (1695) 1695
  - HMS Lizard (ii) 1697
  - HMS Flamborough 1697
  - HMS Seaford 1697
  - HMS Deal Castle 1697
- HMS Seaford 24-gun sixth rate purchased 1695
- HMS Peregrine Galley 20-gun sixth rate 1700
- Nightingale group 24-gun sixth rates 1702–1704
  - HMS Nightingale 1702
  - HMS Squirrel (i) 1703
  - HMS Squirrel (ii) 1704
- Aldborough group 24-gun sixth rates purchased 1706
  - HMS Aldborough 1706
  - HMS Nightingale 1707
  - HMS Deal Castle 1706
- Flamborough group 24-gun sixth rates 1707
  - HMS Flamborough 1707
  - HMS Squirrel 1707
- Gibraltar group 20-gun sixth rates 1711–1716
  - HMS Solebay 1711
  - HMS Gibraltar 1711
  - HMS Port Mahon 1711
  - HMS Blandford 1711
  - HMS Hind 1712
  - HMS Seahorse 1712
  - HMS Rose 1712
  - HMS Bideford 1712
  - HMS Success 1712
  - HMS Greyhound 1712
  - HMS Lively 1713
  - HMS Speedwell 1716
- HMS Dursley Galley 20-gun sixth rate 1719

== Frigates from 1719 to 1750 ==
For ships before the 1745 Establishment, the term 'class' is inappropriate as individual design was left up to the master shipwright in each Royal dockyard. For other vessels, the Surveyor of the Navy produced a common design for ships which were to be built under a commercial contract rather than in a Royal Dockyard. Consequently, the term 'group' is used as more applicable for ships built to similar specifications laid down in the Establishments but to varying designs. However, from 1739 almost all fifth and sixth rates were built under contract and were thus to a common class.

=== Fifth-rate frigates from 1719 to 1750 ===
- 1719 Establishment 40-gun fifth rates 1721–1733
- All thirteen were rebuilds of earlier 40-gun ships (Torrington and Princess Louisa were renamed when rebuilt from the former Charles Galley—first launched in 1679—and Launceston respectively), although Anglesea and Adventure were authorised as 'Great Repairs' rather than as rebuildings.
  - Hector 1721 – broken up 1742
  - Diamond 1723 – broken up 1744
  - Ludlow Castle 1724 – broken up 1749
  - Southsea Castle 1724 – broken up 1744
  - Anglesea 1725 – sunk as a breakwater 1742
  - Kinsale 1725 – broken up 1741
  - Adventure 1726 – broken up 1741
  - Lark 1726 – capsized 1744
  - Pearl 1726 – broken up 1744
  - Mary Galley 1727 – broken up 1744
  - Launceston 1728 – wrecked 1736
  - Torrington 1729 – broken up 1744
  - Roebuck 1733 – sunk as a breakwater 1743
- 1733 Establishment 40-gun (later 44-gun) fifth rates 1736–1741
  - Eltham (1736) – broken up 1763
  - Dover (1741) – sold 1763
  - Folkestone (1741) – sold 1749
  - Faversham (1741) – sold 1749
  - Lynn (1741) – sold 1763
  - Gosport (1741) – broken up 1768
  - Sapphire (1741) – razéed to 32-gun frigate 1756–58, sold 1784
  - Hastings (1741) – broken up 1763
  - Liverpool (1741) – sold 1763
  - Kinsale (1741) – sold 1763
  - Adventure (1741) – razéed to 32-gun frigate 1756–58, sold 1770
  - Diamond (1741) – sold 1756
  - Launceston (1741) – sold 1784
  - Looe (1741) – wrecked 1744
- 1741 Establishment 44-gun ships 1742–1747
  - Anglesea (1742) – taken by the French 1745
  - Torrington (1743) – sold 1763
  - Hector (1743) – sold 1762
  - Roebuck (1743) – lent as a privateer 1763, sold 1764
  - Lark (1744) – sold 1757
  - Pearl (1744) – sold 1759
  - Mary Galley (1744) – used as breakwater 1764
  - Ludlow Castle (1744) – razéed to 24-gun frigate 1762, broken up 1771
  - Fowey (1744) – wrecked 1748
  - Looe (1745) – hulked 1750
  - Chesterfield (1745) – wrecked 1762
  - Poole (1745) – broken up 1765
  - Southsea Castle (1745) – converted to storeship 1760, lost 1762
  - Prince Edward (1745) – sold 1766
  - Anglesea (1746) – used as breakwater 1764
  - Thetis (1747) – converted to hospital ship 1757, sold 1767
- 1745 Establishment 44-gun ships 1747–1749
  - Prince Henry (1747) – broken up 1764
  - Assurance (1747) – wrecked 1753
  - Expedition (1747) – broken up 1764
  - Penzance (1747) – sold 1766
  - Crown (1747) – converted to Storeship 1757, sold 1770
  - Rainbow (1747) – fitted with an experimental all-carronade armament 1782, hulked 1784
  - Humber (1748) – wrecked 1762
  - Woolwich (1749) – sold 1762
- modified 1745 Establishment (lengthened by 6 ft)
  - America (1749) – renamed Boston 1756, sold 1757

=== Sixth-rate frigates from 1719 to 1750 ===
- 1719 Establishment 20-gun sixth rates 1720–1728:
  - HMS Lyme 1720
  - HMS Greyhound 1720
  - HMS Blandford 1720
  - HMS Shoreham 1720
  - HMS Scarborough 1722
  - HMS Garland 1724
  - HMS Seaford 1724
  - HMS Lowestoffe 1723
  - HMS Rose 1724
  - HMS Deal Castle 1727
  - HMS Fox 1727
  - HMS Gibraltar 1727
  - HMS Bideford 1727
  - HMS Seahorse 1727
  - HMS Squirrel 1727
  - HMS Aldborough 1727
  - HMS Flamborough 1727
  - HMS Experiment 1727
  - HMS Rye 1727
  - HMS Phoenix 1728
- Modified 1719 Establishment 20-gun sixth rates 1732:
  - HMS Sheerness 1732
  - HMS Dolphin 1732
- 1733 Establishment 20-gun sixth rates 1734–1742:
  - HMS Tartar 1734
  - HMS Kennington 1736
  - HMS Fox 1740
  - HMS Winchelsea 1740
  - HMS Lyme 1740
  - HMS Rye 1740
  - HMS Experiment 1740
  - HMS Lively 1740
  - HMS Port Mahon 1740
  - HMS Scarborough 1740
  - HMS Success 1740
  - HMS Rose 1740
  - HMS Bideford 1740
  - HMS Bridgewater 1740
  - HMS Seaford 1741
  - HMS Solebay 1742
- HMS Wager 28-gun sixth rate purchased 1739
- Modified 1733 Establishment 20-gun sixth rates 1741
  - HMS Greyhound 1741
  - HMS Blandford 1741
- 1741 Establishment 20-gun sixth rates 1742–1746:
  - HMS Lowestoffe 1742
  - HMS Aldborough 1743
  - HMS Alderney 1743
  - HMS Phoenix 1743
  - HMS Sheerness 1743
  - HMS Wager 1744
  - HMS Shoreham 1744
  - HMS Bridgewater 1744
  - HMS Glasgow 1745
  - HMS Triton 1745
  - HMS Mercury 1745
  - HMS Surprise 1746
  - HMS Siren 1745
  - HMS Fox 1746
  - HMS Rye 1746
- Modified 1741 Establishment 20-gun sixth rates 1746.
  - HMS Centaur 1746
  - HMS Deal Castle 1746
- HMS Nightingale 22-gun sixth rate 1746
- HMS Garland 20-gun sixth rate 1748
- 1745 Establishment 24-gun sixth rates 1746–1751, armed with two nine-pounder canons on the lower deck and 20 on the upper deck, two three-pounders on the quarterdeck
  - HMS Arundel 1746 – sold 1765
  - HMS Queenborough 1747 – driven ashore on the Indian coast near Pondicherry by a hurricane on New Year's Day 1761
  - HMS Fowey 1749 – sunk by shore batteries at Yorktown on 10.10.1781
  - HMS Hind 1749 – sold 1784
  - HMS Sphinx 1748 – sold 1770
  - HMS Dolphin 1751 – broken up 1777
- Modified 1745 Establishment 24-gun sixth rate 1748, armed as the ships above
  - HMS Boston 1748 – broken up 1752
- HMS Seahorse 24-gun sixth rate, designed by Jacob Acworth, 1748, armed with two nine-pounder canons on the lower deck and 22 on the upper deck, two three-pounders on the quarterdeck – sold 1784
- HMS Mermaid 24-gun sixth rate, designed by Joseph Allin, 1749, armed with 20 nine-pounder canons on the upper deck and four three-pounders on the quarterdeck – wrecked off the Coast of South Carolina on 06.01.1760
- Unicorn-class 28-gun sixth rates 1748
- Two nominally 24-gun ships – the Lyme and Unicorn – were built in 1747–1749 with 24 nine-pounders on the upper deck but also carried four smaller guns on the quarterdeck. There were no more guns on the lower deck that was lowered to the waterline; the pair were designated as 24-gun ships (disregarding the smaller guns) until 1756, when they were re-classed as 28-gun frigates. However other 24-gun and 20-gun ships continued to be built, with either 22- or 29-pounder guns on the upper deck.
  - HMS Lyme 1748 – wrecked in the Baltic off the Swedish Coast on 18.10.1760
  - HMS Unicorn 1748 – broken up 1771

== 44-gun fifth rates from 1750 – by class ==
Those fifth-rate ships were not frigates in a stricter sense, being two-deckers, but they were mostly used in the same way, e.g. convoy protection. In addition they were too small to sail in the line of battle. Thus they are listed here. In the middle of the 18th century, those ships had a more powerful armament than the frigates at that time (these were nine and 12-pounders equipped), that consisted of 18-pounders on the gun deck. Later in the century, with the advent of the 18-pounder frigate (the first British 18-pounder armed frigate, HMS Flora (36), was launched in 1780), those ships became obsolete and ceased to being built in 1787, when the last one, HMS Sheerness, was launched. Many continued to serve until after the end of the Napoleonic Wars, most of them as troop- or storeships.

- Phoenix 1759 – wrecked 1780
- Roebuck class 1774–83 (Thomas Slade)
  - HMS Roebuck 1774 – hospital ship 1790, troopship 1799, floating battery 1803, broken up 1811
  - HMS Romulus 1777 – taken by France 1781
  - HMS Actaeon 1778 – hulked 1793
  - HMS Janus 1778 – troopship 1789, wrecked 1800
  - HMS Charon (I) 1778 – sunk 1781
  - HMS Dolphin 1781 – hospital ship 1781, troopship 1800, storeship 1804, broken up 1817
  - HMS Ulysses 1779 – sold 1816
  - HMS Serapis (I) 1779 – taken by John Paul Jones' Bonhomme Richard 1779
  - HMS Endymion 1779 – lost 1790
  - HMS Assurance 1780 – troopship 1791, transport 1796, hulked 1799
  - HMS Argo 1781 – troopship 1791, sold 1816
  - HMS Diomede 1781 – lost 1795
  - HMS Guardian 1784 – sold 1791
  - HMS Mediator 1782 – storeship and renamed Camel 1788, broken up 1810
  - HMS Regulus 1785 – troopship 1800, broken up 1816
  - HMS Resistance 1782 – blown up 1798
  - HMS Serapis (II) 1782 – storeship 1798, broken up 1819
  - HMS Gladiator 1783 – hulked 1807
  - HMS Experiment 1784 – troopship, 1793, hulked 1805
  - HMS Charon (II) 1783 – hospital ship 1794, troopship 1800, broken up 1805
- Adventure class 1784–87 (William Hunt)
  - HMS Adventure 1784 – troopship 1799, hulked 1801, broken up 1816
  - HMS Chichester 1785 – troopship 1787, storeship 1794, sold 1810
  - HMS Expedition 1784 – troopship 1798, hulked 1810, broken up 1817
  - HMS Gorgon 1785 – storeship 1793, floating battery 1805, broken up 1817
  - HMS Woolwich 1785 – troopship 1793, storeship 1798, troopship 1813, wrecked 1813
  - HMS Severn 1786 – wrecked 1804
  - HMS Dover 1786 – transport 1795, accidentally burnt and then broken up 1806
  - HMS Sheerness 1787 – completed as troopship, wrecked 1805

== Sail frigates from 1750 – by class ==
Following the success of the Lyme and Unicorn in 1748, the mid-century period saw the simultaneous introduction in 1756 both of sixth-rate frigates of 28 guns (with a main battery of 24 nine-pounder guns, plus four lesser guns mounted on the quarterdeck and/or forecastle) and of fifth-rate frigates of 32 or 36 guns (with a main battery of 26 12-pounder guns, plus six or ten lesser guns mounted on the quarterdeck and/or forecastle).

The American Revolution saw the emergence of new fifth rates of 36 or 38 guns which carried a main battery of 18-pounder guns, and were thus known as "heavy" frigates, while the French Revolutionary War brought about the introduction of a few 24-pounder gun armed frigates. In the 1830s, new types emerged with a main battery of 32-pounder guns.

=== 9-pounder armed post ships ===
After 1750, the official Admiralty criteria for defining a frigate required a minimum battery of 28 carriage-mounted guns, including such guns which were mounted on the quarterdeck and forecastle. The Admiralty categorized the smaller sixth rates, of frigate-type construction, but carrying between 20 and 26 guns, as "post ships", but seagoing officers often referred to then as "frigates" even though this was not officially recognised. The post ships, generally of 20 or 24 guns, were in practice the continuation of the earlier sixth rates. The Napoleonic War era post ships were later re-armed with (many being completed with) 32-pounder carronades instead of nine-pounder guns; after 1817 most of the survivors (except the Conway class), were re-classified as sloops.

- Gibraltar class 20 guns, 1754–56; built to the lines of the French privateer Tygre captured in 1747.
  - HMS Gibraltar 1754 – broken up 1773
  - HMS Biddeford 1756 – wrecked 1761
  - HMS Flamborough 1756 – sold 1772
  - HMS Aldborough 1756 – broken up 1772
  - HMS Kennington 1756 – broken up 1774
  - HMS Lively 1756 – captured by France 1778, recaptured 1781, sold 1784
  - HMS Mercury 1756 – wrecked 1777
  - HMS Scarborough 1756 – foundered 1780
- Seaford class 20 guns, 1754–57; built to the lines of HM Yacht Royal Caroline of 1749.
  - HMS Seaford 1754 – sold 1784
  - HMS Rose 1757 – scuttled to block Savannah Bar 1779
  - HMS Glasgow 1757 – accidentally burned 1779
- Squirrel class 20 guns, 1755–56; like the Seaford class built to the lines of HMY Royal Caroline.
  - HMS Squirrel 1755 – sold 1783
  - HMS Deal Castle 1756 – lost off Puerto Rico in the Great West Indian Hurricane of 1780
- Bideford class, 20 guns, 1756; built to the lines of Le Tygre, a 26-gun French privateer captured off Ushant on 22 February 1747
  - HMS Bideford, 20 guns 1756–1761, wrecked off North Norfolk 1761
- Sphinx class 20 guns 1775–81; designed by John Williams
  - HMS Sphinx 1775 – broken up 1811
  - HMS Camilla 1776 – hulked 1809, sold 1831
  - HMS Daphne 1776 – taken by France 1795, retaken 1797, sold 1802
  - HMS Galatea 1776 – broken up 1783
  - HMS Ariadne 1776 – sold 1814
  - HMS Vestal 1777 – foundered off Newfoundland 1777
  - HMS Perseus 1776 – converted to bomb vessel 1798, broken up 1805
  - HMS Unicorn 1776 – captured by France 1780, recaptured 1781, broken up 1787
  - HMS Ariel 1777 – taken by French l'Amazone in 1779
  - HMS Narcissus 1781 – wrecked off New Providence 1796
- Porcupine class 24 guns, 1777–81; designed by John Williams
  - HMS Porcupine 1777 – broken up 1805
  - HMS Pelican 1776 – wrecked in a hurricane near Jamaica 1781
  - HMS Eurydice 1781 – hulked as receiving ship 1814, broken up 1834
  - HMS Hyena 1778 – captured by the French 1793, retaken 1797, reclassed as 20-gun ship 1798, sold 1802
  - HMS Penelope 1778 – cast away or foundered in the West Indies in November 1779
  - HMS Amphitrite 1778 – wrecked off Livorno 1794
  - HMS Crocodile 1781 – wrecked on the Scilly Rocks off Prawle Point 1784
  - HMS Siren 1779 – wrecked near Beachy Head 1781
  - HMS Pandora 1779 – wrecked off the Coast of Queensland, Australia, in 1791 while carrying the surviving mutineers of HMS Bounty back to England for trial
  - HMS Champion 1779 – hulked as receiving ship 1809, sold 1816
- HMS Myrmidon 22 guns 1781; built to the lines of Amazone a French privateer captured in 1745 – hulked 1798, broken up 1811
- HMS Squirrel 24 guns 1785; designed by Edward Hunt – hulked as a receiving ship 1812, sold 1817
- Banterer class 22 guns 1806–07; designed by William Rule
  - HMS Banterer 1807 – wrecked in the Saint Laurence Stream 1808
  - HMS Crocodile 1806 – broken up 1816
  - HMS Daphne 1806 – sold 1816; became merchantman and last listed in 1824
  - HMS Cossack 1806 – broken up 1816
  - HMS Cyane 1806 – taken by USS Constitution 1815
  - HMS Porcupine 1807 – sold 1816; became mercantile Windsor Castle and was broken up at Mauritius in 1826
- Laurel class 22 guns 1806–12; designed by John Henslow
  - HMS Laurel 1806 – taken by France 1808, retaken and renamed Laurestinus 1810, wrecked in the Bahamas 1813
  - HMS Boreas 1806 – wrecked on the Guernsey coast 1807
  - HMS Comus 1806 – wrecked at Newfoundland 1816
  - HMS Garland 1807 – sold 1817
  - HMS Perseus 1812 – hulked as receiving ship 1816, broken up 1850
  - HMS Volage 1807 – sold 1818
- Hermes class 20 guns 1811–16; flush-decked sixth rates based on the lines of the French corvette Bonne Citoyenne (1794) taken in 1796; only the last two of the class were given quarterdecks and forecastles in 1820–21, making them post ships
  - HMS Hermes 1811 – grounded and burnt by her crew near Mobile, Alabama, 1814
  - HMS Myrmidon 1813 – broken up 1823
  - HMS Ariadne 1816 – post ship (26 guns) 1820, hulked 1837, sold 1841
  - HMS Valorous 1816 – post ship (26 guns) 1821, broken up 1829
- Cyrus class flush-decked 20-gun sixth rates 1813–14; the design was based on HMS Myrmidon of the Hermes class above, so can be considered a development of that class. Since none of the class possessed a quarterdeck or forecastle, they were actually not post ships
  - HMS Cyrus 1813 – sold 1823
  - HMS Medina 1813 – sold 1832
  - HMS Levant 1813 – captured by USS Constitution 1815, but was recaptured shortly afterwards; broken up 1820
  - HMS Esk 1813 – sold 1827
  - HMS Carron 1813 – wrecked near Puri, India 1820
  - HMS Tay 1813 – wrecked in the Gulf of Mexico 1816
  - HMS Slaney 1813 – 1830 hulked, broken up 1838
  - HMS Erne 1813 – lost 1819 lost
  - HMS Leven 1813 – hulked 1833, broken up 1848
  - HMS Falmouth 1814 – sold 1825
  - HMS Cyrene 1814 – sold 1828
  - HMS Bann 1814 – sold 1829
  - HMS Spey 1814 – sold 1822
  - HMS Lee 1814 – broken up 1822
  - HMS Hind 1814 – sold 1829
  - HMS Larne 1814 – sold 1820
- Conway class 26-gun sixth rates 1814–17 (later re-rated 28-gun); designed by William Rule
  - HMS Conway 1814 – sold 1825
  - HMS Mersey 1814 – hulked as receiving ship 1831, broken up 1852
  - HMS Eden 1814 – broken up 1833
  - HMS Tamar 1814 – hulked as coal depot 1831, sold 1837
  - HMS Dee 1814 – sold 1819
  - HMS Towey 1814 – broken up 1822
  - HMS Menai 1814 – hulked as receiving ship 1829, target ship 1852, broken up 1853
  - HMS Tyne 1814 – sold 1825
  - HMS Wye 1814 – hulked as convict hospital ship 1834, broken up 1852
  - HMS Tees 1817 – hulked as church ship 1826, broken up 1872

=== 9-pounder armed frigates ===
Although previously rated as 24-gun ships (when their four quarterdeck-mounted three-pounders were not included in the count), Unicorn and Lyme were redefined as 28-gun frigates from 1756. The Lowestoffe and Coventry-class frigates which followed were virtual copies of them, with slight improvements in design. Further 28-gun sixth rates, similarly armed with a main battery of 24 nine-pounder guns (and with four smaller carriage guns on the quarterdeck) continued to be built to evolving designs until the 1780s.

- Lowestoffe class 28-gun sixth rates 1756; designed by Thomas Slade based on the Unicorn class of 1748
  - HMS Lowestoffe 1756 – wrecked in the Saint Lawrence River 1760
  - HMS Tartar 1756 – wrecked at San Domingo (Haiti) 1797
- Coventry class 28-gun sixth rates 1757–85; designed by Thomas Slade based on Tartar of the Lowestoffe class above, so a further modification of the Unicorn class
  - HMS Coventry 1757 – taken by the French in the Bay of Bengal 1783
  - HMS Lizard 1757 – hulked as hospital ship at Sheerness 1800, sold 1828
  - HMS Liverpool 1758 – wrecked on Long Island 1778
  - HMS Maidstone 1758 – broken up 1794
  - HMS Active 1758 – taken by the French off San Domingo 1778
  - HMS Levant 1758 – broken up 1780
  - HMS Cerberus 1758 – abandoned and burnt at Rhode Island 1778
  - HMS Aquilon 1758 – sold 1776
  - HMS Griffin 1758 – wrecked on the shoals off Barbuda 1761
  - HMS Argo 1758 – broken up 1776
  - HMS Milford 1759 – sold 1785
  - HMS Guadeloupe 1763 – scuttled at Yorktown to prevent capture 1781.
  - HMS Carysfort 1766 – sold 1813
- fir built Coventry class – due to the nature of the pine wood (fir or pine cannot be bent in tight angles), the design had to be fitted with a square tuck (i.e. flat) stern.
  - HMS Boreas 1757 – sold 1770.
  - HMS Hussar 1757 – stranded on the south coast of Cuba and taken by France 1762.
  - HMS Shannon 1757 – broken up 1765.
  - HMS Trent 1757 – sold 1764
  - HMS Actaeon 1757 – sold 1766
- modified Coventry class slightly modified (8½ inch greater width) revival of the Coventry design
  - HMS Hind 1785 – broken up 1811
  - HMS Laurel – cancelled 1783
- Mermaid class 28-gun sixth rates 1761–63; design by Thomas Slade, adapted from the lines of the French Abénakise, captured 1757
  - HMS Mermaid 1761 – driven ashore and wrecked by a French squadron in Delaware Bay 1778
  - HMS Hussar 1763 – wrecked at Hell Gate of the East River 1780
  - HMS Solebay 1763 – run ashore and burned off Nevis to avoid capture in 1782
- modified Mermaid class (keel lengthened by 8 5/8-inch) 1773–74
  - HMS Greyhound 1773 – wrecked on the South Sand near Deal in 1781
  - HMS Triton 1773 – broken up 1796
  - HMS Boreas 1774 – hulked as slop ship at Sheerness 1797, sold 1802
- Enterprise class 28-gun sixth rates 1773–87; 27 ships, designed by John Williams
  - HMS Siren 1773 – wrecked on the coast of Connecticut 1777
  - HMS Fox 1773 – taken by USS Hancock 1777, retaken by HMS Flora a month later, but then taken by the French Junon off Brest in 1778
  - HMS Enterprise 1774 – hulked as receiving ship at the Tower of London 1791, broken up 1807
  - HMS Surprise 1774 – sold 1783
  - HMS Actaeon 1775 – grounded at Charleston and burnt to avoid capture on 28 June 1776
  - HMS Proserpine 1777 – wrecked off Heligoland in 1799
  - HMS Andromeda 1777 – capsized in the Great West Indian Hurricane of 1780
  - HMS Aurora 1777 – sold 1814
  - HMS Medea 1778 – hulked as a hospital ship at Portsmouth in 1801 and sold 1805
  - HMS Pomona 1778 – renamed Amphitrite in 1795, broken up 1811
  - HMS Resource 1778 – converted to troopship in 1799, hulked as receiving ship at the Tower of London and renamed Enterprize in 1803, broken up 1816
  - HMS Sibyl 1779 – renamed Garland in 1795, lost off Madagascar on 26 July 1798
  - HMS Brilliant 1779 – broken up 1811
  - HMS Crescent 1779 – captured by the French frigates Gloire (1778) and Friponne (1780) on 20 June 1781
  - HMS Mercury 1779 – used as floating battery since 1803, converted to troopship in 1810, broken up 1814
  - HMS Pegasus 1779 – converted to troopship in 1800, hulked as receiving ship in 1814, sold 1816
  - HMS Cyclops 1779 – converted to troopship in 1800, hulked as receiving ship at Portsmouth in 1807, sold 1814
  - HMS Vestal 1779 – converted to troopship in 1800, on lease to Trinity House from 1803 to 1810, hulked as prison ship at Barbados in 1814, sold 1816
  - HMS Laurel 1779 – driven ashore and disintegrated during the Great West Indian Hurricane of 1780
  - HMS Nemesis 1780 – taken by the French in 1795, retaken in 1796, converted to troopship in 1812, sold 1814
  - HMS Thisbe 1783 – converted to troopship in 1800, sold 1815
  - HMS Rose 1783 – wrecked on Rocky Point, Jamaica, on 28 June 1794
  - HMS Hussar 1784 – wrecked near Île Bas on 24 December 1796
  - HMS Dido 1784 – converted to troopship in 1800, hulked as Army prison ship at Portsmouth in 1804, sold 1817
  - HMS Circe 1785 – wrecked near Yarmouth on 6 November 1803
  - HMS Lapwing 1785 – hulked as salvage ship at Cork in 1810, residential ship at Pembroke from 1813, broken up 1828
  - HMS Alligator 1787 – hulked as salvage ship at Cork in 1810, sold 1814

=== 12-pounder armed frigates ===
Almost all of the following were of the 32-gun type (armed with 26 12-pounder guns on the upper deck and six smaller guns on the quarterdeck and forecastle); one class (the Venus class of 1757–58) had 36 guns (with 26 12-pounder guns on the upper deck and 10 smaller guns on the quarterdeck and forecastle)

- Venus class 36-gun fifth rates 1757–58; designed by Thomas Slade
  - HMS Venus 1758 – reclassed as a 32 in 1792, renamed Heroine in 1809, hulked as convict ship in 1824, sold 1828.
  - HMS Pallas 1757 – ran aground on São Jorge Island and sank 1783
  - HMS Brilliant 1757 – sold 1776
- Southampton class 32-gun fifth rates 1757–59; designed by Thomas Slade
  - HMS Southampton 1757 – wrecked in the Bahamas off Conception Island on 27 November 1812
  - HMS Minerva 1759 – taken by the French frigate Concorde in 1778, retaken by HMS Courageux in 1781
  - HMS Vestal 1757 – broken up 1775
  - HMS Diana 1757 – sold 1793
- Richmond class 32-gun fifth rates 1757–58 (batch 1), 1762–63 (batch 2); designed by William Bately
  - HMS Richmond 1757 – taken by the French in the Chesapeake in 1781
  - HMS Juno 1757 – abandoned and burnt at Rhode Island to prevent capture in 1778
  - HMS Thames 1758 – taken by the French frigate Carmagnole (1793) near Gibraltar in 1793, retaken by HMS Santa Margarita in 1796, broken up 1803
  - HMS Lark 1762 – abandoned and burnt at Rhode Island together with HMS Juno
  - HMS Boston 1762 – broken up 1811
  - HMS Jason 1763 – sold 1785
- Alarm class 32-gun fifth rates 1758–66; designed by Thomas Slade
  - HMS Alarm 1758 – broken up 1812
  - HMS Eolus (or Aeolus) 1758 – hulked as receiving ship at Sheerness in 1796, renamed Guernsey in 1800, broken up 1801
  - HMS Stag 1758 – broken up 1783
  - HMS Pearl 1762 – hulked as a slop ship at Portsmouth in 1803, renamed Prothee in 1825, sold 1832
  - HMS Glory 1763 – renamed Apollo in 1774, broken up 1786
  - HMS Emerald 1762 – broken up 1793. (According to Rif Winfield – British Warships in The Age of Sail 1714– 1792. This is a "Niger Class" ship)
  - HMS Aurora 1766 – lost with all hands on her way to the West Indies in 1769
- Niger class 32-gun fifth rates 1759–64; Thomas Slade design, "very similar" to the Alarm class above
  - HMS Niger 1759 – converted to troopship in 1799, reclassed as a 28-gun sixth rate in 1804, sold 1814
  - HMS Montreal 1761 – taken by the French off Málaga on 29 April 1779
  - HMS Quebec 1760 – caught fire and blew up while in action with the French frigate Surveillante (1778) on 5 October 1779
  - HMS Winchelsea 1764 – converted to troopship in 1800, mooring hulk at Sheerness in 1803, sold 1814
- HMS Tweed 32-gun fifth rate 1759; one off design by Sir Thomas Slade, to the lengthened lines of the Tartar (28 guns) of Lowestoffe class (nine-pounder armed) above and built to lighter scantlings according to the French practice, sold 1776
- Lowestoffe class 32-gun fifth rates 1761–74; Thomas Slade design, like Mermaid class (nine-pounder armed) above, adapted from the French Frigate Abénakise, captured in 1757
  - HMS Lowestoffe 32-gun fifth rate 1761 – wrecked off Ingua on 10 August 1801
  - HMS Orpheus 1773 – abandoned and burnt at Rhode Island to prevent capture together with HMS Lark and Juno on 5 August 1778
  - HMS Diamond 1774 – sold 1784
- Amazon (Thetis) class 32-gun fifth rates 1773–87; 18 ships, designed by John Williams.
  - HMS Thetis 1773 – ran onto a rock and sank near Saint Lucia on 12 May 1781.
  - HMS Amazon 1773 – broken up 1794
  - HMS Ambuscade 1773 – taken by the French corvette Bayonnaise in 1798, retaken by HMS Victory in 1803 – broken up 1810
  - HMS Cleopatra 1779 – broken up 1814
  - HMS Amphion 1780 – accidentally caught fire and blew up at Portsmouth on 22 September 1796
  - HMS Orpheus 1780 – wrecked on a coral reef in the West Indies on 23 January 1807
  - HMS Juno 1780 – broken up 1811
  - HMS Success 1781 – taken by the French in the Mediterranean on 13 February 1801, retaken seven months later by HMS Pomone on 2 September, converted to troopship in 1812, hulked as prison ship at Halifax in 1813, broken up 1820
  - HMS Iphigenia 1780 – hulked as prison hospital ship at Plymouth in 1798, converted to troopship in 1801, accidentally burnt in the same year
  - HMS Andromache 1781 – broken up 1811
  - HMS Syren (or Siren) 1782 – hulked as lazaretto at Pembroke in 1805, broken up 1822
  - HMS Iris 1783 – on lease to Trinity House between 1803 and 1805, hulked as receiving ship at Yarmouth in 1811, presented to the Marine Society as a training ship, broken up 1833
  - HMS Greyhound 1783 – wrecked in the Philippines on 4 October 1808
  - HMS Meleager 1785 – wrecked on Triangle Bank in the Gulf of Mexico on 9 June 1801
  - HMS Castor 1785 – sold 1819
  - HMS Solebay 1785 – on lease to Trinity House from 1803 to 1806, wrecked in action with a Senegalese fort on 11 June 1809
  - HMS Terpsichore 1785 – hulked as receiving ship at Chatham in 1811, broken up 1813
  - HMS Blonde 1787 – hulked for stationary service at Portsmouth in 1803, sold 1805
- Active class 32-gun fifth rates 1779–84; designed by Edward Hunt
  - HMS Active 1780 – wrecked in the Saint Lawrence River on 15 July 1796
  - HMS Daedalus 1780 – on lease to Trinity House from 1803 to 1806, broken up 1811
  - HMS Mermaid 1784 – converted to troopship in 1811, broken up 1815
  - HMS Cerberus 1779 – wrecked near Bermuda on 30 April 1783
  - HMS Fox 1780 – converted to troopship in 1812, broken up 1816
  - HMS Astraea (or Astrea) 1781 – fitted as troopship between 1800 and 1805, wrecked on rocks off Anegada on 24 May 1808
  - HMS Ceres 1781 – hulked as receiving ship at Sheerness in 1803, transferred to Chatham as harbour flagship in 1812, converted into a victualling depot in 1816 and broken up 1830
  - HMS Quebec 1781 – temporarily hulked at Woolwich between 1803 and 1805, hulked as receiving ship at Sheerness in 1813, broken up 1816
- Andromeda or Hermione class 32-gun fifth rates 1782–86; designed by Edward Hunt
  - HMS Andromeda 1784 – broken up 1811
  - HMS Hermione 1782 – seized by mutineers on 22 September 1797, given to the Spanish garrison at La Guaira, cut out of the harbour and retaken on 25 October 1799, renamed Retaliation shortly after, renamed Retribution in 1800, presented to Trinity House in 1803
  - HMS Druid 1783 – fitted as troopship from 1798 to 1805, broken up 1813
  - HMS Penelope 1783 – broken up 1797
  - HMS Aquilon 1786 – broken up 1816
  - HMS Blanche 1786 – wrecked in the entrance to the Texel
- HMS Heroine 32-gun fifth rate 1783; purchased on the stocks from Adams of Bucklers Hard in 1782 – converted to troopship in 1800, hulked 1803
- Maidstone class 32-gun fifth rates 1795–96; designed by John Henslow, fir-built version of the Cerberus (or Alcmene) class of 18-pounder frigates of 1794
  - HMS Maidstone 1795 – broken up 1810
  - HMS Shannon 1796 – sold 1802
- HMS Triton 32-gun fifth rate 1796; experimental "Admiralty" design by rear-admiral James Gambier, the Lord Commissioner of the Admiralty; fir-built, the ship was originally intended to carry 18-pounders but was considered too weak for the armament – hulked as receiving ship at Woolwich in 1803, transferred to Plymouth in 1810, sold 1814
- Thames class 32-gun fifth rates 1804–06; design modified from William Bately's Richmond class of 1757
  - HMS Circe 1804 – sold 1814
  - HMS Pallas 1804 – wrecked in the Firth of Forth on 18 December 1810
  - HMS Thames 1805 – converted to troopship in 1814, broken up 1816
  - HMS Jason 1804 – broken up 1815
  - HMS Hebe 1804 – sold 1813
  - HMS Minerva 1805 – broken up 1816
  - HMS Alexandria 1806 – hulked as receiving ship at Sheerness in 1817, broken up 1818
  - HMS Medea – cancelled 1804

=== 18-pounder armed frigates ===
In general, the following were either 36-gun type (armed with 26 18-pounder guns on the upper deck and 10 smaller guns on the quarterdeck and forecastle) or 38-gun type (with 28 18-pounder guns on the upper deck and 10 smaller guns on the quarterdeck and forecastle); however, one class of smaller ships had just 32 guns (with 26 18-pounder guns on the upper deck and just six smaller guns on the quarterdeck and forecastle)

- Flora class 36-gun fifth rates 1780, designed by John Williams
  - HMS Flora 1780 – wrecked and destroyed on the Dutch coast on 19 January 1808
  - HMS Thalia 1782 – broken up 1814
  - HMS Crescent 1784 – wrecked on the Coast of Jutland on 6 December 1808
  - HMS Romulus 1785 – converted to troopship in 1799, hulked as hospital ship at Bermuda in 1813, broken up 1816
- Minerva class 38-gun fifth rates 1780–82, designed by Edward Hunt
  - HMS Minerva 1780 – broken up 1803
  - HMS Arethusa 1781 – broken up 1814
  - HMS Phaeton 1782 – Sold 1827
- HMS Latona 38-gun fifth rate 1781, designed by John Williams – converted to troopship 1810, hulked as receiving ship at Leith 1813, sold 1816
- HMS Thetis 38-Gun fifth rate 1782, designed by Edward Hunt, modified from the Minerva class above – used as troopship between 1800 and 1805, sold 1814
- Perseverance class 36-gun fifth rates 1781–83, designed by Edward Hunt
  - HMS Perseverance 1781 – hulked as receiving ship circa 1806, sold 1823
  - HMS Phoenix 1783 – wrecked near Smyrna on 20 February 1816
  - HMS Inconstant 1783 – used as troopship between 1798 and 1806, broken up 1817
  - HMS Leda 1783 – capsized in a squall and foundered off Madeira 11 December 1795
- HMS Melampus 36-gun fifth rate 1785, designed by Edward Hunt – sold to the Dutch Navy in 1815
- HMS Beaulieu 40-gun fifth rate 1791 – purchased on the stocks in June 1790 from Adams of Bucklers Hard – broken up 1806
- Pallas class 32-gun fifth rates 1793–94; designed by John Henslow
  - HMS Pallas 1793 – wrecked on Mount Batten Point, Plymouth on 4 April 1798
  - HMS Stag 1794 – wrecked in Vigo Bay, Spain on 6 September 1800
  - HMS Unicorn 1794 – broken up 1815
- Cerberus (or Alcmene) class 32-gun fifth rates 1794, designed by John Henslow
  - HMS Cerberus 1794 – sold 1814
  - HMS Alcmene 1794 – wrecked off Nantes on 29 April 1809.
  - HMS Galatea 1794 – broken up 1809
  - HMS Lively 1794 – wrecked near Rota Point, Cádiz on 12 April 1798
- Artois class 38-gun fifth rates 1794–97; designed by John Henslow
  - HMS Artois 1794 – wrecked near La Rochelle on 31 July 1797
  - HMS Diana 1794 – sold to the Dutch Navy in 1815
  - HMS Apollo 1794 – wrecked on the Haak Sands off the coast of Holland on 7 January 1799
  - HMS Diamond 1794 – broken up 1812
  - HMS Jason 1794 – wrecked near Brest on 13 October 1798
  - HMS Seahorse 1794 – broken up 1819
  - HMS Ethalion 1797 – wrecked on rocks off Penmarch, Brittany, on 19 December 1799
- fir-built Artois class with alterations necessary for fir wood, notably the flat, square tuck stern
  - HMS Clyde (I) 1796 – taken to pieces for rebuilding in 1805
  - HMS Tamar (or Tamer) 1796 – broken up 1810
  - HMS Clyde (II) 1806 – rebuilt from the previous ship of that name, laid up in 1810, sold 1814
- Phoebe class 36-gun fifth rates 1795–1800, lengthened version of William Hunt's Perseverance class of 1780
  - HMS Phoebe 1795 – hulked as receiving ship at Plymouth 1826, sold 1841
  - HMS Dryad 1795 – hulked as receiving ship at Portsmouth 1838, broken up 1860
  - HMS Caroline 1795 – hulked as salvage vessel at Portsmouth 1813, broken up 1815
  - HMS Doris 1795 – wrecked in Quiberon Bay on 21 January 1805
  - HMS Fortunee 1800 – sold 1818
- Amazon class 36-gun fifth rates 1795–96, designed by William Rule
  - HMS Amazon 1795 – hit a sandbank and was abandoned three hours later during the action against the French 74-gun ship Droits de l'Homme in Audierne Bay, Brittany on 14 January 1797
  - HMS Emerald 1795 – hulked as receiving ship at Portsmouth in 1822, broken up 1836
- fir-built Amazon class with alterations necessary for fir wood, notably the flat, square tuck stern
  - HMS Trent 1796 – hospital ship laid up at Cork in 1803, hulked 1815, broken up 1823
  - HMS Glenmore 1796 – in Ordinary at Plymouth in 1803 until sold for breaking up in 1814
- HMS Naiad 38-gun fifth rate 1797, designed by William Rule – hulked as a coal depot at Callao, Peru in 1847, sold 1866
- HMS Acasta 40-gun fifth rate 1797, designed by William Rule – broken up 1821
- HMS Boadicea 38-gun fifth rate 1797, built to the lines of the French Impérieuse, taken in 1793 – broken up 1858
- HMS Sirius 36-gun fifth rate 1797, built to the lines of the French Minerve, taken in 1794 and renamed San Fiorenzo – grounded at Mauritius and destroyed to prevent capture 1810
- HMS Hydra 38-gun fifth rate 1797; built to the lines of the French Melpomène, captured in 1794, a sister ship to Minerve and Impérieuse above – converted to troopship 1813, sold 1820
- Amazon class 38-gun fifth rates 1799, designed by William Rule
  - HMS Amazon 1799 – broken up 1817
  - HMS Hussar 1799 – wrecked in the Bay of Biscay in February 1804
- HMS Active 38-gun fifth rate 1799; designed by John Henslow – hulked as receiving ship 1825, renamed Argo 1833, broken up 1860.
- Leda class 38-gun fifth rates 1800–19, built to the lines of the French Hébé of 1782
  - HMS Leda 1800 – wrecked at the mouth of Milford Haven on 31 January 1808
  - HMS Pomone 1805 – wrecked on the Needles on 14 October 1811
  - HMS Shannon 1806 – hulked as receiving ship at Sheerness in 1831, renamed Saint Lawrence in 1844, broken up 1859
  - HMS Leonidas 1807 – hulked as powder hulk at Sheerness in 1872, sold 1894
  - HMS Briton 1812 – hulked as convict ship at Portsmouth in 1841, broken up 1860
  - HMS Surprise 1812 – hulked as convict ship at Cork in 1822, sold 1837
  - HMS Tenedos 1812 – hulked as convict ship at Bermuda in 1843, converted to accommodation ship in 1863, broken up 1875
  - HMS Lacedemonian 1812 – broken up 1822
  - HMS Lively 1813 – hulked as receiving ship 1831, sold 1863
  - HMS Diamond 1816 – accidentally burnt at Portsmouth on 18 April 1827
  - HMS Amphitrite 1816 – razeed to a 26-gun corvette, transferred to the Coast Guard in 1857
  - HMS Trincomalee 1817 – Teak built, cut down to a 26-gun corvette in 1847, hulked as training ship for volunteers at Sunderland in 1861, sold 1897 to Wheatley Cobb at Falmouth, became training ship Foudroyant, still afloat as museum ship under her original name at Hartlepool
  - HMS Thetis 1817 – wrecked off Cape Frio, Brazil, on 5 December 1830
  - HMS Arethusa 1817 – hulked as lazaretto at Liverpool in 1836, renamed Bacchus in 1844, transferred to Plymouth in 1850, and transformed to coal depot in 1852, sold for breaking in 1883
  - HMS Blanche 1819 – hulked as receiving ship at Portsmouth in 1833, sold for breaking in 1865
  - HMS Fisgard 1819 – hulked as harbour flagship at Woolwich in 1847, broken up 1879
- modified Leda class 46-gun fifth rates 1820–30
  - HMS Venus 1820 – hulked and lent to the Marine Society in 1848, broken up 1865
  - HMS Melampus 1820 – transferred to the Coastguard at Southampton in 1857, returned to the Navy at Portsmouth in 1866, used as an ordnance store for the War Office until 1891, sold 1906
  - HMS Minerva 1820 – broken up 1895
  - HMS Latona 1821 – hulked as mooring vessel at Sheerness in 1868, powder depot at Portsmouth in 1872, broken up 1875
  - HMS Nereus 1821 – hulked as coal depot at Valparaíso in 1843, sold 1879
  - HMS Diana 1822 – hulked as receiving ship at Sheerness in 1868, broken up 1874
  - HMS Hebe 1826 – hulked as receiving ship at Woolwich in 1839, transferred to Sheerness for breaking in 1872
  - HMS Hamadryad 1823 – hulked as hospital ship at Cardiff in 1866, sold 1905
  - HMS Amazon 1821 – cut down to a 26-gun corvette in 1845, sold 1863
  - HMS Aeolus (or Eolus) 1825 – hulked as stores depot at Sheerness in 1846, transferred to Portsmouth as accommodation ship in 1855, transformed into a lazaretto in 1761, broken up 1886
  - HMS Thisbe 1824 – hulked as floating church at Cardiff 1863, sold 1892
  - HMS Cerberus 1827 – broken up 1866
  - HMS Circe 1827 – hulked as accommodation ship 1866, swimming bath 1885, renamed Impregnable IV, sold for breaking in 1922
  - HMS Clyde 1827 – hulked as RNR training ship at Aberdeen in 1870, sold 1904
  - HMS Thames 1823 – hulked as convict ship at Deptford in 1841, transferred to Bermuda in 1844, sunk in 1863, wreck subsequently sold for breaking
  - HMS Fox 1829 – converted to screw propulsion in 1856, broken up 1882
  - HMS Unicorn 1824 – never fitted for sea, hulked as training ship for the RNR at Dundee in 1860 and still afloat there as museum ship
  - HMS Daedalus 1826 – cut down to a corvette in 1844, hulked as training ship for the RNR at Bristol in 1861, sold for breaking in 1911
  - HMS Proserpine 1830 – sold 1864
  - HMS Mermaid 1825 – hulked as Army powder ship at Purfleet in 1858, returned to the Navy and used as a powder depot at Dublin in 1863, bruken up 1875
  - HMS Mercury 1826 – hulked as coal depot at Woolwich in 1862, transferred to Sheerness in 1873, sold 1906
  - HMS Penelope 1829 – converted to paddle frigate in 1843, sold 1864
  - HMS Thalia 1830 – hulked as Roman Catholic chapel ship at Portsmouth in 1855, broken up 1867
- Cydnus class 38-gun fifth rates, eight pine-built ships (essentially identical to the Leda class, with the exception of a flat stern, necessary for "fir-built" ships), 1813
  - HMS Cydnus 1813 – broken up 1816
  - HMS Eurotas 1813 – broken up 1817
  - HMS Niger 1813 – broken up 1820
  - HMS Meander 1813 – broken up 1817
  - HMS Pactolus 1813 – broken up 1818
  - HMS Tiber 1813 – broken up 1820
  - HMS Araxes 1813 – broken up 1817
  - HMS Tanais 1813 – broken up 1819
  - HMS Nemesis – altered to Seringapatam class
  - HMS Statira – altered to Seringapatam class
  - HMS Jason – altered to Seringapatam class
  - HMS Druid – altered to Seringapatam class
  - HMS Pegasus – cancelled 1831
- Penelope class 36-gun fifth rates 1798–1800, designed by John Henslow
  - HMS Penelope 1798 – troopship in 1814, wrecked in the Saint Lawrence River in 1815
  - HMS Amethyst 1799 – wrecked and subsequently broken up 1811
  - HMS Jason 1800 – wrecked in 1801
- HMS Lavinia 44-gun fifth rate 1806, designed by Jean-Louis Barrallier – hulked as lazaretto in Liverpool in 1836, coal depot at Plymouth in 1852, sunk in Plymouth Sound after collision with HAPAG Ship Cimbria
- Amphion class 32-gun fifth rates 1798–1809, designed by William Rule.
  - HMS Amphion 1798 – breakwater 1820
  - HMS Aeolus 1801 – broken up 1817
  - HMS Medusa 1801 – hulked as hospital ship at Plymouth in 1813, broken up 1816
  - HMS Proserpine 1807 – taken by the French Pénélope and Pauline off Toulon on 28 February 1809
  - HMS Nereus 1809 – broken up 1817
- Narcissus class 32-gun fifth rates 1801–1808, designed by John Henslow
  - HMS Narcissus 1801 – hulked as convict ship at Woolwich in 1823, sold 1837
  - HMS Tartar 1801 – wrecked in the Baltic Sea on 18 August 1811
  - HMS Cornelia 1808 – broken up 1814
  - HMS Siren – cancelled 1806
  - HMS Doris – cancelled 1806
- Apollo class, 27 ships, 36-gun fifth rates 1799–1819, designed by William Rule
  - HMS Apollo 1799 – wrecked near Cabo Mondego (Portugal) in April 1804
  - HMS Blanche 1800 – taken by the French 40-gun 18-pounder Frigate Topaze in July 1805
  - HMS Euryalus 1803 – paid off in March 1825
  - HMS Semiramis 1808 – guardship at Portsmouth in 1821, cut down to 24-gun corvette in 1827, broken up in November 1844
  - HMS Owen Glendower 1808 – convict ship at Gibraltar in October 1842, receiving ship athere in 1880, sold in 1884
  - HMS Curacoa 1809 – cut down to 24-gun corvette in 1831, broken up in March 1849
  - HMS Saldanha 1809 – wrecked and sank with all hands off Lough Swilly on 4 December 1811
  - HMS Malacca 1809 – paid off in June 1815, broken up in March 1816
  - HMS Orpheus 1809 – laid up at Chatham in September 1816, broken up in August 1819
  - HMS Theban 1809 – broken up in May 1817
  - HMS Leda 1809 – sold in April 1817
  - HMS Manilla 1809 – wrecked on the Haak Sands off the Texel at Callantsoog on 28 January 1812
  - HMS Belvidera 1809 – store depot at Portsmouth in 1846, receiving ship in 1852, sold in July 1906
  - HMS Hotspur 1810 – in ordinary at Portsmouth in November 1815, broken up in January 1821
  - HMS Astraea 1810 – broken up in 1851
  - HMS Galatea 1810 – receiving ship and coal depot on Jamaica in 1839, broken up in 1849
  - HMS Havannah 1811 – cut down to 24-gun corvette in 1845, training ship at Cardiff, sold for breaking in 1905
  - HMS Maidstone 1811 – receiving ship at Portsmouth in August 1832, coal depot there in 1838, broken up in January 1867
  - HMS Stag 1812 – laid up at Plymouth in November 1814, broken up in September 1821
  - HMS Magicienne 1812 – broken up in March 1845
  - HMS Barrosa 1812 – laid up in September 1815, receiving ship and ordnance depot at Portsmouth in 1823, sold in 1841
  - HMS Dartmouth 1813 – paid off in March 1830, broken up in November 1854
  - HMS Creole 1813 – harbour service at Chatham in 1833, broken up in August of the same year
  - HMS Tartar 1814 – receiving ship at Sheerness in March 1830, broken up in September 1859
  - HMS Brilliant 1814 – training ship in 1860, renamed Briton in 1889, sold for breaking in 1908
  - HMS Pallas 1816 – coal depot at Plymouth in November 1836, sold in January 1862
  - HMS Blonde 1819 – completed to a new 46-gun design
- Aigle class 36-gun fifth rates, 1801, designed by John Henslow
  - HMS Aigle 1801
  - HMS Resistance 1801
- HMS Ethalion 36-gun fifth rate 1802
- Lively class 38-gun fifth rates 1804–13, designed by William Rule
  - HMS Lively 1804
  - HMS Resistance 1805
  - HMS Apollo 1805
  - HMS Hussar 1807
  - HMS Statira 1807
  - HMS Horatio 1807
  - HMS Spartan 1806
  - HMS Undaunted 1807
  - HMS Menelaus 1810
  - HMS Nisus 1810
  - HMS Macedonian 1810
  - HMS Crescent 1810
  - HMS Bacchante 1811
  - HMS Nymphe 1812
  - HMS Sirius 1813
  - HMS Laurel 1813
- HMS Forte 38-gun fifth rate 1814, built to the Lines of the French Révolutionnaire, captured in 1794 – broken up 1844
- Perseverance class 36-gun fifth rates 1803–11 (a revival of the class of 1781–83 – see above)
  - HMS Tribune 1803 – cut down to a 24-gun corvette in 1833, lost near Tarragona on 28 November 1839
  - HMS Shannon 1803 – run ashore near La Hogue and burnt to avoid capture on 10 December 1803
  - HMS Meleager 1806 – wrecked on Bare Bush Key east of Jamaica on 30 July 1808
  - HMS Iphigenia 1806 – presented to the Marine Society as training ship in 1833, broken up 1851
  - HMS Orlando 1811 – hulked as hospital ship at Trincomalee in 1819, sold 1824
  - HMS Lowestoffe – cancelled 1805
- teak-built Perseverance class – same as above but built from teak wood in Bombay dockyard
  - HMS Salsette 1805 – hulked as lazaretto at Pembroke in 1831, receiving ship at Woolwich in 1835, broken up 1874
  - HMS Doris 1807 – sold at Valparaíso 1829
- HMS Hyperion 32-gun fifth rate 1807, designed by John Henslow on the basis of the French Magicienne of 1778
- HMS Bucephalus 32-gun fifth rate 1808, designed by William Rule
- HMS Pyramus 36-gun fifth rate 1810, built to the lines of the French Belle Poule of 1765
- Purchased ships of 1804–05 (all teak-built in India)
  - HMS Sir Edward Hughes 1804
  - HMS Duncan 1805
  - HMS Howe 1805
- Scamander class 36-gun fifth rates, 10 pine-built ships, 1813–14
  - HMS Eridanus 1813
  - HMS Orontes 1813
  - HMS Scamander 1813
  - HMS Tagus 1813
  - HMS Ister 1813
  - HMS Tigris 1813
  - HMS Euphrates 1813
  - HMS Hebrus 1813
  - HMS Granicus 1813
  - HMS Alpheus 1814
- Seringapatam class 46-gun fifth rates, 1819–40
  - HMS Seringapatam 1819
  - HMS Madagascar 1822
  - HMS Druid 1825
  - HMS Nemesis 1826
  - HMS Africaine 1827
  - HMS Leda 1828
  - HMS Hotspur 1828
  - HMS Eurotas 1829
  - HMS Andromeda 1829
  - HMS Seahorse 1830
  - HMS Stag 1830
  - HMS Forth 1833
  - HMS Maeander 1840
  - HMS Euphrates – cancelled 1831
  - HMS Orpheus – cancelled 1831
  - HMS Severn – cancelled 1831
  - HMS Tiber – cancelled 1831
  - HMS Manilla – cancelled 1831
  - HMS Spartan – cancelled 1831
  - HMS Theban – cancelled 1831
  - HMS Jason – cancelled 1831
  - HMS Statira – cancelled 1832
  - HMS Tigris – cancelled 1832
  - HMS Inconstant – cancelled 1832
  - HMS Pique – cancelled 1832

=== 24-pounder armed frigates ===
- 1794 razees 44-gun (converted from 64-gun ships of the line in 1794)
  - HMS Indefatigable converted 1794
  - HMS Anson converted 1794
  - HMS Magnanime converted 1794
- HMS Endymion 40 guns 1797; later classed as 50-gun frigate; built to the lines of the French Pomone of 1785 (captured 1794) – broken up 1868
- Endymion class 40-gun (later classed as 50-gun) "fir-built" (actually pitch pine-built) fifth rates 1813–14
  - HMS Severn 1813 – sold 1825
  - HMS Liffey 1813 – broken up 1827
  - HMS Liverpool 1814 – sold 1822
  - HMS Glasgow 1814 – broken up 1828
  - HMS Forth 1814 – broken up 1819
- HMS Cambrian 40-gun fifth rate 1797; designed by John Henslow – wrecked in the Mediterranean 1828
- HMS Leander 50-gun (later 60-gun) fourth rate 1813; designed by William Rule – broken up 1830
- HMS Newcastle 50-gun (later 60-gun) fourth rate 1813; design by Jean-Louis Barrallier – hulked 1824, no records after 1827
- HMS Isis 58-gun fourth rate 1819; designed by William Rule – hulked 1861, sold 1867
- HMS Java 50-gun fourth rate 1815; designed by the "Surveyors of the Navy" – hulked 1861, broken up 1862
- Southampton class 58-gun fourth rates 1820–03; modified from the design of the Java above
  - HMS Southampton 1820 – presented to the Coastguard 1857, sold 1912
  - HMS Portland 1822 – hulked as floating depot 1846, sold 1862
  - HMS Lancaster 1823 – hulked as hospital ship 1847, sold 1864
  - HMS Winchester 1822 – hulked as training ship and renamed Conway 1862, renamed Mount Edgcumbe, sold 1921
  - HMS Chichester 1843 – hulked and presented to the National Refuge Society, sold 1889
  - HMS Worcester 1843 – hulked as training ship 1862, sold for breaking 1885
  - HMS Liverpool – cancelled 1829
  - HMS Jamaica – cancelled 1829
- HMS President 52-gun (later 60-gun) fourth rate 1829; built to the lines of the USS President (captured 1814) – hulked as Royal Navy Reserve training ship 1861, renamed Old President and then sold 1903

=== 32-pounder armed frigates ===
- razees 56-gun (converted from 74-gun ships of the line)
  - HMS Goliath converted 1813
  - HMS Saturn converted 1813
  - HMS Majestic converted 1813
  - HMS Elephant converted 1817–18
  - HMS Excellent conversion began 1825
- HMS Castor 36-gun fifth rate 1832
- HMS Vernon 50-gun fourth rate 1832
- Pique class 36-gun fifth rates 1834–41
  - HMS Pique 1834
  - HMS Cambrian 1841
  - HMS Flora 1844
  - HMS Active 1845
  - HMS Sybille 1847
  - HMS Constance – re-ordered to different design
  - HMS Chesapeake – re-ordered as steam/screw frigate
- HMS Inconstant 36-gun fifth rate 1836
- HMS Thetis 36-gun fifth rate 1846
- HMS Nankin 50-gun fourth rate 1850

The following classes were launched as sailing frigates but converted to steam when still active in c. 1860.

- Raleigh class 50-gun fourth rates 1845
  - HMS Raleigh 1845 (wrecked 1857)
  - HMS Severn (later converted to screw)
- Constance class 50-gun fourth rates 1846
  - HMS Constance 1846 (later converted to screw)
  - HMS Arethusa 1849 (later converted to screw)
  - HMS Octavia 1849 (later converted to screw)
  - HMS Sutlej 1855 (later converted to screw)
  - HMS Liffey – re-ordered as steam/screw frigate
- Leander class 50-gun fourth rates 1848
  - HMS Leander 1848 (later converted to screw)
  - HMS Shannon – re-ordered as steam/screw frigate
- HMS Phaeton 50-gun fourth rate 1848 (later converted to screw)
- Indefatigable class 50-gun fourth rates 1848
  - HMS Indefatigable 1848 (retired 1857, later a training ship)
  - HMS Phoebe 1854 (later converted to screw)

The following three classes were begun as sailing frigates, but all were completed as screw-driven steam frigates.

- Emerald class 50-gun fourth rates, ordered 1848.
- San Fiorenzo class 50-gun fourth rates, ordered 1848.
- Narcissus class 50-gun fourth rates, ordered 1848.

== 19th century steam frigates ==
During the 1840s, the introduction of steam propulsion was to radically change the nature of the frigate. Initial trials were with paddle-driven vessels, but these had numerous disadvantages, not least that the paddle wheels restricted the numbers of guns that could be mounted on the broadside. So the application of the screw propeller meant that a full broadside could still be carried, and a number of sail frigates were adapted, while during the 1850s the first frigates designed from the start to have screw propulsion were ordered. All these early steam vessels still carried a full rig of masts and sails, and steam power remained a means of assistance to these vessels.

In 1887 all frigates and corvettes in the British Navy were re-categorised as 'cruisers', and the term 'frigate' was abolished, not to re-emerge until the Second World War, at which time it was resurrected to describe a totally different type of escort vessel.

=== Paddle-driven frigates ===
Although iron hulls were used for some warships in the 1840s, almost all the paddle frigates were wooden-hulled. The exception was the ill-fated Birkenhead.

- Cyclops class 1839–44 – second class, originally classed just as 'steam vessels', lengthened versions of sloop Gorgon
  - HMS Cyclops 1839
  - HMS Vulture 1843
  - HMS Firebrand 1842
  - HMS Gladiator 1844
- HMS Sampson 1844 – second class, originally classed just as a 'steam vessel', lengthened version of Cyclops with modified hull
- Centaur class 1845 – second class, originally classed just as 'steam vessels', lengthened version of Firebrand
  - HMS Centaur 1845
  - HMS Dragon 1845
- HMS Penelope 1843 – first class, originally built as a sailing frigate in 1829
- HMS Retribution 1844 – first class, originally classed just as a 'steam vessel', modified version of Cyclops
- HMS Terrible 1845 – first class, originally classed just as a 'steam vessel'
- HMS Avenger 1845 – first class
- HMS Birkenhead (ex-Vulcan) iron-hulled frigate 1845 – second class, launched as a frigate but completed as a troopship in 1847
- HMS Odin 1846 – first class
- HMS Sidon 1846 – first class, improved version of Odin
- HMS Leopard 1850 – second class, lengthened version of Odin
- HMS Tiger 1849 – second class, enlarged version of sloop Sphinx
- Magicienne class 1849 – second class, enlarged version of sloop Sphinx
  - HMS Magicienne 1849
  - HMS Valorous 1851
- Furious class 1850 – second class, enlarged version of sloop Sphinx
  - HMS Furious 1850
  - HMS Resolute – cancelled 1850

=== Screw-driven frigates ===
In the mid-1840s, the Admiralty ordered four iron-hulled, screw-driven frigates from specialist shipbuilders; however, the Admiralty then rapidly lost faith in the ability of iron hulls to stand up to combat conditions, and all four (Greenock, Vulcan, Megaera and Simoom) were converted while under construction into troop transports, although the Greenock was promptly sold for commercial use.

Following this unsuccessful experiment, though iron hulls were used for some warships in the 1840s, almost all the screw frigates below were wooden-hulled. The exceptions were the final three below – Inconstant, Shah and Raleigh – which had iron hulls.

- HMS Amphion 1846 – the prototype screw frigate
- HMS Arrogant 1848 – first class
- Dauntless class 1847 – second class
  - HMS Dauntless 1847
  - HMS Vigilant – cancelled 1849
- Termagant class 1847 – second class
  - HMS Termagant 1847
  - HMS Euphrates – cancelled 1849
- Tribune class 1853 – second class
  - HMS Tribune 1853
  - HMS Curacoa 1854
- Imperieuse class 1852
  - HMS Imperieuse 1852
  - HMS Euryalus 1853
  - HMS Aurora 1861
  - HMS Forte 1858
  - HMS Chesapeake 1855
- Liffey class 1856
  - HMS Liffey 1856
  - HMS Shannon 1855
  - HMS Topaze 1858
  - HMS Bacchante 1859
  - HMS Liverpool 1860
- Diadem class 1856–57
  - HMS Diadem 1856
  - HMS Doris 1857
- Ariadne class 1859
  - HMS Ariadne 1859
  - HMS Galatea 1859
- Emerald class 1856
  - HMS Emerald 1856
  - HMS Melpomene 1857
  - HMS Immortalite 1859
- Mersey class 1858
  - HMS Orlando 1858
  - HMS Mersey 1858
- HMS Narcissus 1859
- Bristol class 1860
  - HMS Newcastle 1860
  - HMS Glasgow 1861
  - HMS Bristol 1861
  - HMS Undaunted 1861
  - Ten further vessels to this design were cancelled in 1863–64 – Tweed, Dryad, Belvidera, Pomone, Raleigh, Briton, Barham, Boadicea, Bucephalus and Dextrous.
- Ister class 1865
  - HMS Endymion 1865
  - Four further vessels to this design were cancelled in 1863–64 – Ister, Blonde, Astrea and Dartmouth.
- HMS Inconstant iron-hulled frigate 1868
- HMS Shah iron-hulled frigate 1873
- HMS Raleigh iron-hulled frigate 1873

== Modern frigates – by class ==
The term 'frigate' was revived during World War II for a new type of escort vessel and has been employed continuously since that period. Note that, unlike the previous sections, no lists of the individual ships comprising each class are shown below the class names; the individual vessels are to be found in the articles on the separate classes.

- River class – 138 ships, 1941–1944
- Colony class – 21 ships
- Captain class – 78 ships
- Loch class – 26 ships
- Bay class – 21 ships (redesigned Loch class for anti-aircraft escort)
- Type 15 – 23 ships (full rebuilds of World War II destroyer hulls)
- Type 16 – 10 ships (partial rebuilds of wartime destroyer hulls)
- Type 41 Leopard class – 4 ships
- Type 61 Salisbury class – 4 ships
- Type 12 Whitby class – 6 ships
- Type 12M Rothesay class – 9 ships
- Type 12I Leander class – 26 ships (subclasses: 8 Batch 1, 8 Batch 2, 10 Batch 3)
- Type 14 Blackwood class – 12 ships
- Type 81 Tribal class – 7 ships
- Type 21 Amazon class – 8 ships
- Type 22 – 14 ships (subclasses: Broadsword 4, Boxer 6, Cornwall 4)
- Type 23 Duke class – 16 ships
- Type 26 City class – 8 ships planned, all under order as of November 2022
- Type 31 frigate – 5 ships planned, all under order as of November 2019
- Type 32 frigate – 5 ships planned

== Reference sources ==
- Robert Gardiner, The First Frigates (Conway Maritime, 1992); The Heavy Frigate (Conway Maritime, 1994); Warships of the Napoleonic Era (Chatham Publishing, 1999); Frigates of the Napoleonic Wars (Chatham Publishing, 2000)
- Rif Winfield, The Sail and Steam Navy List, 1815–1889 (co-author David Lyon, Chatham Publishing, 2004) ISBN 1-86176-032-9;
  British Warships in the Age of Sail: 1793–1817 (2nd edition, Seaforth Publishing, 2008) ISBN 978-1-84415-717-4;
  British Warships in the Age of Sail: 1714–1792 (Seaforth Publishing, 2007) ISBN 978-1-84415-700-6;
  British Warships in the Age of Sail: 1603–1714 (Seaforth Publishing, 2009) ISBN 978-1-84832-040-6.

== See also ==
- Type system of the Royal Navy
- Bibliography of 18th-19th century Royal Naval history
