= List of Royal Navy orders for shipbuilding in the Later Stuart period (1660-1713) =

This is a consolidated listing of all orders for new or rebuilt ships placed by the Admiralty (through its subsidiary body, the Navy Board) between the Restoration of the Stuart Monarchy in 1660—taken as the formal date for the creation of the Royal Navy of England (from 1707, of Britain) as an institution - and the death of Queen Anne in 1714. All vessels ordered are listed chronologically by order date, divided according to the Board of Admiralty under which the orders were placed. Orders placed during the period of office of a Lord High Admiral are treated as though the person was equivalent to a Board of Admiralty.

== James, Duke of York, as Lord High Admiral ==
King Charles II appointed his brother James as Lord High Admiral in 1660; the latter remained in post until 15 June 1673, when Charles II took over the role himself.

Date of order	Name of vessel	Type and class	Date of launch	Notes
19 Jan 1663	Royal Katherine	2nd Rate (76 gun)	26 Oct 1664	
19 Jan 1663	Royal Oak	2nd Rate (76 gun)	26 Dec 1664	
26 Oct 1664	Bonaventure (RB)	3rd Rate (60 gun)	26 Jan 1666	Originally Commonwealth frigate President (1650)
26 Oct 1664	Constant Warwick (RB)	3rd Rate (60 gun)	26 Jan 1666	
26 Oct 1664	Saint Michael	2nd Rate (84 gun)	30 Sep 1669	Reclassed as 1st Rate 1672 to 1689
26 Oct 1664	unnamed	2nd Rate (84 gun)	not built	Ordered at Woolwich Dyd; cancelled 15 April 1665
26 Oct 1664	Rupert	3rd Rate (60 gun)	26 Jan 1666	
26 Oct 1664	Defiance	3rd Rate (60 gun)	27 Mar 1666	
26 Oct 1664	Cambridge	3rd Rate (60 gun)	May 1666	
26 Oct 1664	Monmouth	3rd Rate (60 gun)	Mar 1667	
9 Nov 1664	Victory	2nd Rate (76 gun)	26 Dec 1664	
11 Nov 1664	Greenwich	4th Rate (50 gun)	7 Jun 1666	
11 Nov 1664	Saint David	4th Rate (50 gun)	30 Mar 1667	
1 Apr 1665	Warspite	3rd Rate (60 gun)	8 Jun 1666	
15 Apr 1665	Saint Patrick	4th Rate (50 gun)	9 May 1666	
Apr 1665	Loyal London	2nd Rate (80 gun)	10 Jun 1666	
15 Apr 1665	Sweepstakes	5th Rate (36 gun)	21 Mar 1666	
15 Apr 1665	Falcon	5th Rate (36 gun)	1666	
15 Apr 1665	Little Victory	5th Rate (26 gun)	1665	
30 Jun 1666	Charles	1st Rate (96 gun)	10 Mar 1668	
15 Jul 1667	London	1st Rate (96 gun)	25 Jul 1670	
1667	Saint Andrew	1st Rate (96 gun)	4 Oct 1670	
22 Apr 1669	Royal James	1st Rate (100 gun)	31 Mar 1671	
26 Apr 1671	Royal Charles	1st Rate (100 gun)	Mar 1673	
1672	Lilly	Unrated (6 gun)	1673	Sloop
1672	Swallow	Unrated (2 gun)	1673	Sloop
1672	Tulip	Unrated (2 gun)	1673	Sloop
1672	Dove	Unrated (4 gun)	1673	Sloop
1672	Whipster	Unrated (4 gun)	1673	Sloop
1672	Lizard	Unrated (4 gun)	1673	Sloop
1672	Dolphin	Unrated (4 gun)	1673	Sloop
1672	Vulture	Unrated (4 gun)	1673	Sloop
29 Oct 1672	Prevention	Unrated (4 gun)	1673	Sloop
27 Jan 1673	Cutter	Unrated (4 gun)	1673	Sloop
27 Jan 1673	Hunter	Unrated (4 gun)	1673	Sloop
27 Jan 1673	Invention	Unrated (4 gun)	1673	Sloop
27 Jan 1673	Hound	Unrated (4 gun)	1673	Sloop
27 Jan 1673	Chatham	Unrated (4 gun)	1673	Sloop
27 Jan 1673	Chatham Double	Unrated (4 gun)	1673	Sloop
27 Jan 1673	Bonetta	Unrated (4 gun)	1673	Sloop
27 Jan 1673	Woolwich	Unrated (4 gun)	1673	Sloop
1 Apr 1673	Royal James	1st Rate (100 gun)	29 Jun 1675	Replacement for ship of 1671

== King Charles II, as Lord High Admiral ==
There were no new orders placed for shipbuilding during this 24-day brief interregnum.

== Prince Rupert's Board ==
King Charles II placed the office into commission on 9 July 1673 and appointed Prince Rupert as First Lord of the Admiralty and head of the commissioners. This board remained in place for almost 6 years. While only six Rated ships were ordered during the first 3 of those years, a large "Thirty Great Ships" Programme, approved by Parliament on 5 March 1677, occupied the Royal Dockyard and some commercial contractors for the rest of the decade.

Date of order	Name of vessel	Type and class	Date of launch	Notes
1674	Kingfisher	4th Rate (50 gun)	Jan 1676	Name recorded as King's Fisher
1673	Rose	5th Rate (28 gun)	Sep 1674	
30 Sep 1674	Sapphire	5th Rate (32 gun)	29 Jun 1675	
30 Sep 1674	Lark	6th Rate (18 gun)	11 Jun 1675	
8 Jan 1676	James Galley	5th Rate (30 gun)	2 Oct 1676	Galley frigate
22 Mar 1676	Charles Galley	5th Rate (30 gun)	12 Sep 1676	Galley frigate
22 Mar 1677	Experiment	unrated (4 guns)	Jul 1677	"In imitation of a brigantine"
5 Mar 1677	Britannia	1st Rate (100 gun)	28 Jun 1682	
Apr 1677	Lenox	3rd Rate (70 gun)	18 Apr 1678	
Apr 1677	Hampton Court	3rd Rate (70 gun)	10 Jul 1678	
Apr 1677	Anne	3rd Rate (70 gun)	7 Nov 1678	
Apr 1677	Restoration	3rd Rate (70 gun)	28 May 1678	
Apr 1677	Berwick	3rd Rate (70 gun)	29 May 1679	
Apr 1677	Burford	3rd Rate (70 gun)	10 Nov 1679	
Apr 1677	Eagle	3rd Rate (70 gun)	31 Jan 1679	
Apr 1677	Expedition	3rd Rate (70 gun)	10 Sep 1679	
Apr 1677	Grafton	3rd Rate (70 gun)	15 May 1679	
Apr 1677	Pendennis	3rd Rate (70 gun)	25 Dec 1679	
5 May 1677	Vanguard	2nd Rate (90 gun)	19 Nov 1678	
5 May 1677	Windsor Castle	2nd Rate (90 gun)	5 Mar 1679	
5 May 1677	Sandwich	2nd Rate (90 gun)	17 Apr 1679	
May 1677	Northumberland	3rd Rate (70 gun)	30 Jun 1679	
9 Jun 1677	Captain	3rd Rate (70 gun)	24 Jul 1678	
19 Sep 1677	Duchess	2nd Rate (90 gun)	17 May 1679	
20 Feb 1678	Essex	3rd Rate (70 gun)	16 May 1679	
20 Feb 1678	Kent	3rd Rate (70 gun)	15 May 1679	
20 Feb 1678	Exeter	3rd Rate (70 gun)	22 Mar 1680	
20 Feb 1678	Suffolk	3rd Rate (70 gun)	20 May 1680	
Mar 1678	Hope	3rd Rate (70 gun)	3 Mar 1679	
Mar 1678	Elizabeth	3rd Rate (70 gun)	25 Nov 1679	
9 Jul 1678	Stirling Castle	3rd Rate (70 gun)	29 Jul 1679	
9 Jul 1678	Bredah	3rd Rate (70 gun)	26 Sep 1679	
1678	Albemarle	2nd Rate (90 gun)	29 Oct 1680	
1678	Coronation	2nd Rate (90 gun)	23 May 1685	
8 Sep 1678	Neptune	2nd Rate (90 gun)	17 Apr 1683	
1 Mar 1679	Duke	2nd Rate (90 gun)	13 Jun 1682	
3 Apr 1679	Ossory	2nd Rate (90 gun)	24 Aug 1682	

== Sir Henry Capell's Board ==
King Charles II appointed Sir Henry Capell as 1st Lord, to lead a Board on 14 May 1679. This board remained in place for 21 months, but no new orders for shipbuilding were placed during this period.

== Daniel Finch's Board ==
King Charles II appointed Daniel Finch (Later Earl of Nottingham and Winchelsea) as First Lord, to lead a board on 19 February 1681. This board remained in place for 39 months.

Date of order	Name of vessel	Type and class	Date of launch	Notes
29 Apr 1682	Saint Albans	4th Rate (50 gun)	Jun 1687	
15 Sep 1682	Deptford	4th Rate (50 gun)	Jun 1687	
6 Jan 1683	Sedgemoor	4th Rate (50 gun)	May 1687	

== King Charles II, as Lord High Admiral ==
On 19 May 1684 Charles II dissolved the Commission and resumed the office of Lord High Admiral himself, retaining the post until his death. There were no orders placed for shipbuilding during this 9 months period.

== King James II, as Lord High Admiral ==
Following his brother's death, King James assumed the role of Lord High Admiral himself, and remained in this post until the Glorious Revolution in 1688.

Date of order	Name of vessel	Type and class	Date of launch	Notes
1686	Mary Galley	4th Rate (34 guns)	1687	Galley frigate
18 Jun 1687	Salamander	Bomb vessel	late 1687	
4 Dec 1687	Firedrake	Bomb vessel	23 Jun 1688	

== Lord Torrington's Board ==
King William placed the administration of the Admiralty into commission on 8 March 1689, with Admiral Arthur Herbert (later Lord Torrington) as First Lord. The 28-gun 5th Rates below were purpose-built fireships.

Date of order	Name of vessel	Type and class	Date of launch	Notes
24 Jun 1689	Mermaid (RB)	5th Rate (32 gun)	Dec 1689	Order was "to repair"
28 Jun 1689	Experiment	5th Rate (32 gun)	17 Dec 1689	
28 Jun 1689	Pembroke	5th Rate (32 gun)	17 Dec 1689	
28 Jun 1689	Milford	5th Rate (32 gun)	18 Mar 1690	
28 Jun 1689	Portsmouth	5th Rate (32 gun)	13 May 1690	
28 Jun 1689	Sheerness	5th Rate (32 gun)	6 Mar 1691	
6 Dec 1689	Dolphin	5th Rate (28 gun)	29 Mar 1690	Contract date 13 December 1689
6 Dec 1689	Speedwell	5th Rate (28 gun)	3 Apr 1690	Contract date 18 December 1689
6 Dec 1689	Spy	5th Rate (28 gun)	6 Apr 1690	
6 Dec 1689	Hopewell	5th Rate (28 gun)	15 Apr 1690	Contract date 16 December 1689
6 Dec 1689	Fox	5th Rate (28 gun)	16 Apr 1690	
6 Dec 1689	Griffin	5th Rate (28 gun)	17 Apr 1690	
6 Dec 1689	Hawk	5th Rate (28 gun)	17 Apr 1690	
6 Dec 1689	Roebuck	5th Rate (28 gun)	17 Apr 1690	Contract date 13 December 1689
6 Dec 1689	Hound	5th Rate (28 gun)	18 Apr 1690	Contract date 13 December 1689
6 Dec 1689	Vulture	5th Rate (28 gun)	18 Apr 1690	
6 Dec 1689	Wolf	5th Rate (28 gun)	18 Apr 1690	
6 Dec 1689	Hunter	5th Rate (28 gun)	29 Apr 1690	

== Earl of Pembroke's Board ==
King William on 20 January 1690 appointed a new Board, nominally headed by the Earl of Pembroke, although its effective head was Rear-Adm Sir John Chicheley as Senior Naval Lord. Chicheley was replaced as Senior Naval Lord om 5 June 1690 by Admiral Edward Russell, who was in turn replaced on 23 January 1691 by Captain Henry Priestman. Notably, the construction under this Board included a "Twenty-seven Ships" Programme, approved by Parliament on 24 December 1690, comprising 17 Third Rate ships of 80 guns and 10 Third Rate ships of 60 guns, ordered at various points over the next five years.

Date of order	Name of vessel	Type and class	Date of launch	Notes
7 Mar 1690	Adventure	5th Rate (40 gun)	20 Feb 1691	
14 Mar 1690	Chatham	4th Rate (52 gun)	20 Apr 1691	
20 Mar 1690	Centurion	4th Rate (50 gun)	6 Mar 1691	
20 Mar 1690	Chester	4th Rate (50 gun)	21 Mar 1691	
15 Aug 1690	Norwich	4th Rate (48 gun)	16 Jul 1691	
15 Aug 1690	Weymouth	4th Rate (48 gun)	8 Aug 1693	
5 Sep 1690	Vulcan	5th Rate (28 gun)	21 Feb 1691	Contract date 31 October 1690
5 Sep 1690	Blaze	5th Rate (28 gun)	5 Mar 1691	Contract date 21 October 1690
5 Sep 1690	Flame	5th Rate (28 gun)	6 Mar 1691	Contract date 31 October 1690
5 Sep 1690	Strombolo	5th Rate (28 gun)	7 Mar 1691	
25 Sep 1690	Aetna	5th Rate (28 gun)	19 Mar 1691	Contract date 20 October 1690
25 Sep 1690	Phaeton	5th Rate (28 gun)	19 Mar 1691	Contract date 31 October 1690
25 Sep 1690	Lightning	5th Rate (28 gun)	20 Mar 1691	Contract date 31 October 1690
25 Sep 1690	Vesuvius	5th Rate (28 gun)	30 Mar 1691	Contract date 31 October 1690
20 Oct 1690	Hart	Ketch (10 gun)	23 Mar 1691	
20 Oct 1690	Roe	Ketch (10 gun)	8 Apr 1691	
20 Oct 1690	Harp	Ketch (10 gun)	24 Apr 1691	
20 Oct 1690	Scarborough	Ketch (10 gun)	2 May 1691	
31 Oct 1690	Hind	Ketch (10 gun)	2 Apr 1691	
31 Oct 1690	Talbot	Ketch (10 gun)	6 Apr 1691	
31 Oct 1690	Eaglet	Ketch (10 gun)	7 Apr 1691	
31 Oct 1690	Aldborough	Ketch (10 gun)	6 May 1691	
21 Jan 1691	Shark	Brigantine (6 gun)	20 Apr 1691	
12 Mar 1691	Devonshire	3rd Rate (80 gun)	5 Apr 1692	Contract date in column 1
12 Mar 1691	Cornwall	3rd Rate (80 gun)	23 Apr 1692	Contract date in column 1
12 Mar 1691	Humber	3rd Rate (80 gun)	30 Mar 1693	
16 Mar 1691	Boyne	3rd Rate (80 gun)	21 May 1692	
16 Mar 1691	Sussex	3rd Rate (80 gun)	3 Jun 1692	Renamed Russell 9 May 1692
16 Mar 1691	Ipswich	3rd Rate (70 gun)	19 Apr 1694	
16 Mar 1691	Medway	3rd Rate (60 gun)	20 Sep 1693	
18 Apr 1691	Royal William (RB)	1st Rate (100 gun)	21 Apr 1692	Rebuild of Prince
1691	Queen (RB)	1st Rate (100 gun)	Jan 1693	Rebuild of Royal Charles
21 Dec 1691	Norfolk	3rd Rate (80 gun)	28 Mar 1693	
30 Dec 1691	Carlisle	3rd Rate (60 gun)	11 Feb 1693	
1 Jan 1692	Falmouth	4th Rate (50 gun)	25 Jun 1693	
13 Jan 1692	Dispatch	Brigantine (6 gun)	10 May 1692	
13 Jan 1692	Discovery	Brigantine (6 gun)	9 May 1692	
17 Feb 1692	Portland	4th Rate (50 gun)	28 Mar 1693	
17 Feb 1692	Anglesea	4th Rate (50 gun)	17 Apr 1694	

== Lord Cornwallis's Board ==
King William on 10 March 1692 appointed Lord Charles Cornwallis to be First Lord in a fresh Admiralty Board.

Date of order	Name of vessel	Type and class	Date of launch	Notes
13 May 1692	Torbay	3rd Rate (80 gun)	16 Dec 1693	
13 May 1692	Sussex	3rd Rate (80 gun)	11 Apr 1693	
28 Jun 1692	Rochester	4th Rate (50 gun)	15 Mar 1693	
13 Jul 1692	Southampton	4th Rate (50 gun)	10 Jun 1693	
Aug 1692	Norwich	4th Rate (50 gun)	24 Aug 1693	
19 Dec 1692	Diligence	Brigantine (6 gun)	23 Mar 1693	
19 Dec 1692	Spy	Brigantine (6 gun)	15 Apr 1693	
25 Jan 1693	Firedrake	Bomb vessel	Jun 1693	
25 Jan 1693	Granado	Bomb vessel	26 Jun 1693	
26 Jan 1693	Serpent	Bomb vessel	24 Jun 1693	
26 Jan 1693	Mortar	Bomb vessel	25 Jun 1693	
19 Feb 1693	Shoreham	5th Rate (32 gun)	6 Jan 1694	
3 Mar 1693	Newark	3rd Rate (80 gun)	3 Jun 1695	
10 Mar 1693	Scarborough	5th Rate (32 gun)	15 Feb 1694	Renamed Milford 1697
10 Apr 1693	Sorlings	5th Rate (32 gun)	19 Mar 1694	
10 Apr 1693	Winchelsea	5th Rate (32 gun)	13 Sep 1694	

== Viscount Falkland's Board ==
King William on 15 April 1693 appointed a new Board under Anthony Carey, 5th Viscount Falkland, as First Lord.

Date of order	Name of vessel	Type and class	Date of launch	Notes
20 Apr 1693	Sunderland	3rd Rate (60 gun)	17 Mar 1694	
1 Jun 1693	Dorsetshire	3rd Rate (80 gun)	8 Dec 1694	
21 Jul 1693	Maidstone	6th Rate (24 gun)	31 Dec 1693	
21 Jul 1693	Jersey	6th Rate (24 gun)	17 Jan 1694	
21 Jul 1693	Lizard	6th Rate (24 gun)	19 Mar 1694	
21 Jul 1693	Newport	6th Rate (24 gun)	7 Apr 1694	
6 Nov 1693	Fly	Advice boat (4 gun)	1694	
6 Nov 1693	Mercury	Advice boat (4 gun)	1694	
6 Nov 1693	Messenger	Advice boat (4 gun)	1694	
6 Nov 1693	Post Boy	Advice boat (4 gun)	1694	
16 Nov 1693	Romney	4th Rate (50 gun)	23 Oct 1694	Contract dated 23 February 1694
16 Nov 1693	Colchester	4th Rate (50 gun)	23 Oct 1694	Contract dated 23 February 1694
16 Nov 1693	Lichfield	4th Rate (50 gun)	4 Feb 1695	
16 Nov 1693	Lincoln	4th Rate (50 gun)	19 Feb 1695	
16 Nov 1693	Coventry	4th Rate (50 gun)	20 Apr 1695	
16 Nov 1693	Severn	4th Rate (50 gun)	16 Sep 1695	Contract dated 7 December 1694?
16 Nov 1693	Burlington	4th Rate (50 gun)	16 Sep 1695	Contract dated 7 December 1694?
16 Feb 1694	Lyme	5th Rate (32 gun)	20 Apr 1695	
28 Mar 1694	Falcon	6th Rate (24 gun)	28 Sep 1694	
2 Apr 1694	Hastings	5th Rate (32 gun)	5 Feb 1695	
16 Apr 1694	Queenborough	6th Rate (24 gun)	22 Dec 1694	
1694	Solebay	6th Rate (24 gun)	13 Sep 1694	

== Earl of Orford's Board ==
King William on 2 May 1694 appointed a new Board with the Earl of Orford as First Lord.

Date of order	Name of vessel	Type and class	Date of launch	Notes
2 May 1694	Swan	6th Rate (24 gun)	13 Sep 1694	
2 May 1694	Drake	6th Rate (24 gun)	26 Sep 1694	
2 May 1694	Seahorse	6th Rate (24 gun)	27 Sep 1694	Contract dated 6 May 1694
4 May 1694	Cumberland	3rd Rate (80 gun)	12 Nov 1695	
11 May 1694	Biddeford	6th Rate (24 gun)	25 Oct 1695	Contract dated 15 May 1694
11 May 1694	Penzance	6th Rate (24 gun)	22 Apr 1695	Contract dated 3 October 1694
17 May 1694	Milford	5th Rate (32 gun)	6 Mar 1695	
18 Nov 1694	Harwich	4th Rate (50 gun)	14 Sep 1695	Contract dated 2 November 1694
18 Nov 1694	Pendennis	4th Rate (50 gun)	15 Oct 1695	Contract dated 2 November 1694
20 Dec 1694	Association	2nd Rate (90 gun)	1 Jan 1697	
20 Dec 1694	Namur	2nd Rate (90 gun)	28 Apr 1697	
20 Dec 1694	Barfleur	2nd Rate (90 gun)	10 Aug 1697	
20 Dec 1694	Triumph	2nd Rate (90 gun)	2 Mar 1698	
24 Dec 1694	Arundel	5th Rate (32 gun)	13 Sep 1695	
27 Dec 1694	Rye	5th Rate (32 gun)	7 Jun 1696	
9 Jan 1695	Serpent	Bomb vessel	5 Apr 1695	
9 Jan 1695	Thunder	Bomb vessel	13 Apr 1695	
9 Jan 1695	Furnace	Bomb vessel	18 Apr 1695	
9 Jan 1695	Granado	Bomb vessel	18 Apr 1695	
9 Jan 1695	Carcass	Bomb vessel	20 Apr 1695	
9 Jan 1695	Comet	Bomb vessel	23 Apr 1695	
9 Jan 1695	Basilisk	Bomb vessel	4 May 1695	Renamed from Furious 16 April 1695
9 Jan 1695	Dreadful	Bomb vessel	6 May 1695	
9 Jan 1695	Blast	Bomb vessel	22 May 1695	
9 Jan 1695	Terror	Bomb vessel	11 Jan 1696	
22 Feb 1695	Scarborough	5th Rate (36 gun)	24 Mar 1696	
1 Apr 1695	Looe	5th Rate (32 gun)	5 Aug 1696	
3 May 1695	Lynn	5th Rate (32 gun)	24 Apr 1696	
3 May 1695	Fowey	5th Rate (32 gun)	7 May 1696	
3 May 1695	Southsea Castle	5th Rate (32 gun)	1 Aug 1696	
3 May 1695	Gosport	5th Rate (32 gun)	3 Sep 1696	
5 Jun 1695	Poole	5th Rate (32 gun)	6 Aug 1696	
9 Aug 1695	Faversham	5th Rate (36 gun)	1 Oct 1696	Spelt Feversham
12 Sep 1695	Blackwall	4th Rate (50 gun)	6 Jul 1696	
12 Sep 1695	Guernsey	4th Rate (50 gun)	6 Jul 1696	
25 Sep 1695	Nonsuch	4th Rate (50 gun)	20 Aug 1696	
25 Sep 1695	Warwick	4th Rate (50 gun)	20 Aug 1696	
24 Dec 1695	Hampshire	4th Rate (50 gun)	3 Mar 1698	Contract dated 14 February 1696
24 Dec 1695	Dartmouth	4th Rate (50 gun)	3 Mar 1698	
24 Dec 1695	Winchester	4th Rate (50 gun)	17 Mar 1698	
24 Dec 1695	Salisbury	4th Rate (50 gun)	18 Apr 1698	
24 Dec 1695	Worcester	4th Rate (50 gun)	31 May 1698	Contract dated 26 February 1696
24 Dec 1695	Jersey	4th Rate (50 gun)	24 Nov 1698	Contract dated 31 July 1696
24 Dec 1695	Carlisle	4th Rate (50 gun)	16 May 1698	
24 Dec 1695	Tilbury	4th Rate (50 gun)	29 Sep 1699	
24 Nov 1696	Kinsale	5th Rate (36 gun)	22 May 1700	
1696	Hastings	5th Rate (32 gun)	17 May 1698	
24 Dec 1696	Lowestoffe	5th Rate (32 gun)	7 Aug 1697	
24 Dec 1696	Looe	5th Rate (36 gun)	15 Oct 1697	
24 Dec 1696	Southsea Castle	5th Rate (32 gun)	6 Nov 1697	
15 Feb 1697	Bridgwater	5th Rate (36 gun)	30 May 1698	
1697	Ludlow	5th Rate (32 gun)	12 Sep 1698	
25 Feb 1699	Royal Katherine (RB)	2nd Rate (90 gun)	23 Feb 1703	Renamed Ramillies 18 December 1706
25 Feb 1699	Greenwich (RB)	4th Rate (56 gun)	1699	
20 May 1699	Saint George (RB)	2nd Rate (90 gun)	Jul 1701	

== Earl of Bridgwater's Board ==
King William on 31 May 1699 appointed a new Board under John Egerton, 3rd Earl of Bridgewater as First Lord, with Sir John Rooke as Senior Naval Lord.

Date of order	Name of vessel	Type and class	Date of launch	Notes
1 Jul 1699	Bonetta	Unrated (2 gun)	1 Sep 1699	Sloop
1 Jul 1699	Shark	Unrated (2 gun)	5 Sep 1699	Sloop
1 Jul 1699	Prohibition	Unrated (2 gun)	5 Sep 1699	Sloop
1 Jul 1699	Merlin	Unrated (2 gun)	30 Sep 1699	Sloop
1 Jul 1699	Swallow	Unrated (2 gun)	30 Sep 1699	Sloop
1 Jul 1699	Fox	Unrated (2 gun)	14 Oct 1699	Sloop
1 Jul 1699	Swift	Unrated (2 gun)	2 Nov 1699	Sloop
1 Jul 1699	Wolf	Unrated (2 gun)	2 Nov 1699	Sloop
13 Jan 1700	Prince George (RB)	2nd Rate (90 gun)	3 Dec 1701	Renamed from Duke 31 December 1701
1700	Otter	Unrated (4 gun)	3 Aug 1700	Sloop
1700	Hound	Unrated (4 gun)	3 Sep 1700	Sloop

== Earl of Pembroke's 2nd Board ==
On 4 April 1701, King William appointed a new Board under Thomas Herbert, the Earl of Pembroke, as First Lord, with Rooke remaining as Senior Naval Lord. However, on 26 January 1702 he dissolved the Board, and appointed Pembroke as Lord High Admiral. Queen Anne succeeded to the throne on 8 March 1702 on the death of William III, with renewal of war against France just weeks away. As an interim step, she re-appointed Pembroke as Lord High Admiral until 20 May 1702.

Date of order	Name of vessel	Type and class	Date of launch	Notes
22 Jul 1701	Albemarle (RB)	2nd Rate (90 gun)	1704	Renamed Union 29 December 1709
6 Mar 1702	Swallow	4th Rate (50 gun)	22 Feb 1703	
6 Mar 1702	Rupert (RB)	3rd Rate (60 gun)	11 Nov 1703	

== Prince George of Denmark's Board ==
In May 1702, Queen Anne briefly took upon herself the post of Lord High Admiral, but the following day transferred the role to her husband, Prince George of Denmark. As the latter had no naval or administrative experience, a Council was appointed to assist him, on which Admiral George Churchill (Marlborough's brother) was in practice the governing influence. The Senior Naval Lord was Admiral Sir George Rooke, who was replaced on 11 June 1705 by Admiral Sir David Mitchell, and on 19 April 1708 by David Wemyss, 4th Earl of Wemyss.

Date of order	Name of vessel	Type and class	Date of launch	Notes
4 Jul 1702	Newcastle	4th Rate (56 gun)	24 Mar 1704	
4 Jul 1702	Anthelope	4th Rate (50 gun)	13 Mar 1703	
8 Jul 1702	Leopard	4th Rate (54 gun)	15 Mar 1703	Contract date 8 July 1702
8 Jul 1702	Panther	4th Rate (54 gun)	15 Mar 1703	Contract date 8 July 1702
19 Mar 1703	Reserve	4th Rate (54 gun)	18 Mar 1704	
10 Jun 1703	Crown (RB)	4th Rate (54 gun)	24 Jun 1704	
29 Feb 1704	Ruby (RB)	4th Rate (54 gun)	18 Feb 1706	
10 Nov 1705	Saint Albans	4th Rate (54 gun)	27 Aug 1706	Contract date 16 November 1705
10 Nov 1705	Colchester	4th Rate (54 gun)	22 Feb 1707	
27 Apr 1706	Salisbury	4th Rate (54 gun)	3 Jul 1707	
29 Aug 1706	Royal George	1st Rate (100 gun)	30 Sep 1715	Rebuild of Queen
7 Nov 1706	Dragon	4th Rate (54 gun)	Oct 1707	
8 Feb 1707	Falmouth	4th Rate (54 gun)	26 Feb 1708	
26 Feb 1707	Pembroke	4th Rate (54 gun)	16 May 1710	
26 Mar 1707	Ruby	4th Rate (54 gun)	15 Mar 1708	
29 Dec 1707	Chester	4th Rate (54 gun)	18 Oct 1708	
29 Dec 1707	Romney	4th Rate (54 gun)	2 Dec 1708	

== Earl of Pembroke's 3rd Board ==
Queen Anne on 28 November 1708 placed the Admiralty in commission under a Board led by the Earl of Pembroke as First Lord again.

Date of order	Name of vessel	Type and class	Date of launch	Notes
20 Jun 1709	Jamaica	Unrated (Sloop)	30 Sep 1710	
20 Jun 1709	Trial	Unrated (Sloop)	30 Sep 1710	

== Earl of Orford's 2nd Board ==
Queen Anne on 8 November 1709 appointed a new Board, bringing back Admiral Edward Russell, Earl of Orford as First Lord, and with Sir John Leake as Senior Naval Lord.

Date of order	Name of vessel	Type and class	Date of launch	Notes
11 Jul 1712	Strafford	4th Rate (54 gun)	16 Jul 1714	

== Sir John Leake's Board ==
Queen Anne on 4 October 1710 appointed Sir John Leake as First Lord, with Sir George Byng as Senior Naval Lord.

Date of order	Name of vessel	Type and class	Date of launch	Notes
24 Jan 1711	Ferret	Unrated (Sloop)	20 Apr 1711	
24 Jan 1711	Happy	Unrated (Sloop)	19 Apr 1711	
24 Jan 1711	Hazard	Unrated (Sloop)	19 Apr 1711	
24 Jan 1711	Shark	Unrated (Sloop)	20 Apr 1711	
24 Jan 1711	Solebay	6th Rate (20 gun)	21 Aug 1714	
24 Jan 1711	Port Mahon	6th Rate (20 gun)	18 Oct 1711	
24 Jan 1711	Gibraltar	6th Rate (20 gun)	18 Oct 1711	
24 Jan 1711	Blandford	6th Rate (20 gun)	29 Oct 1711	
24 Jan 1711	Hind	6th Rate (20 gun)	31 Oct 1711	
21 Aug 1711	Seahorse	6th Rate (20 gun)	13 Feb 1712	
29 Sep 1711	Rose	6th Rate (20 gun)	25 Apr 1712	
9 Oct 1711	Biddeford	6th Rate (20 gun)	14 Mar 1714	
9 Oct 1711	Greyhound	6th Rate (20 gun)	21 Jun 1712	
9 Oct 1711	Success	6th Rate (20 gun)	30 Apr 1712	
22 Apr 1712	Lively	6th Rate (20 gun)	28 May 1713	
11 Jul 1712	Worcester	4th Rate (54 gun)	31 Aug 1714	

== Earl of Strafford's Board ==
Queen Anne on 30 September 1712 appointed a new Board under Thomas Wentworth, Earl of Strafford as First Lord, with Sir John Leake again reverting to Senior Naval Lord.

Date of order	Name of vessel	Type and class	Date of launch	Notes
1 Sep 1713	Cambridge	3rd Rate (80 gun)	17 Sep 1715	
1 Jan 1714	Royal William (RB)	1st Rate (100 gun)	3 Sep 1719	Rebuild of Queen
1714	Rochester (RB)	4th Rate (54 gun)	19 Mar 1716	
26 Jan 1714	Panther (RB)	4th Rate (54 gun)	26 Apr 1716	
3 Mar 1714	Dartmouth (RB)	4th Rate (54 gun)	7 Aug 1716	

== See also ==
- List of bomb vessels of the Royal Navy
- List of corvette and sloop classes of the Royal Navy
- List of early warships of the English navy
- List of fireships of the Royal Navy
- List of frigate classes of the Royal Navy
- List of royal yachts of the United Kingdom
- List of ships of the line of the Royal Navy
