= 1694 Programme Group =

Class overview
- Name: 1694 Programme Group
- Builders: six by Dockyard; thirteen by contract
- Operators: Kingdom of England; Kingdom of Great Britain after 1707
- Preceded by: 1693 Programme Group
- Succeeded by: Betty (1695)
- Built: 1694–1699
- In service: 1695–1741
- Completed: 19
- Lost: 10
- Retired: 9

General characteristics
- Type: 32-gun fifth rate
- Tons burthen: 36692/94 tons (bm)
- Length: 108 ft 02 in (33.0 m) gundeck; 88 ft 0 in (26.8 m) keel for tonnage
- Beam: 28 ft 0 in (8.5 m) for tonnage
- Depth of hold: 10 ft 6 in (3.2 m)
- Sail plan: ship-rigged
- Armament: as built; 4/8 × 4 demi-culverins (LD); 22/20 × sakers (UD); 6/4 × 4 minions (QD); 1703 Establishment; 8/4 × 4 9-pdr guns (LD); 22/20 × 6-pdr guns (UD); 6/4 × 4-pdr guns (QD)

General characteristics 1719 Establishment
- Class & type: 20-gun sixth rate
- Tons burthen: 3755/94 tons (bm)
- Length: 106 ft 1 in (32.33 m) gundeck; 87 ft 10 in (26.77 m) keel for tonnage
- Beam: 28 ft 4 in (8.64 m)
- Depth of hold: 9 ft 2 in (2.79 m)
- Propulsion: Sails
- Sail plan: Full-rigged ship
- Armament: 1719 Establishment 20 guns; 20 × 6-pdr guns (UD)

The 1694 Programme of 32-gun fifth rates were derived from the 1693 programme vessels as demi-batterie ships. The concept was to have one tier of ordnance flush on the upper deck for use in all weathers on a freeboard of at least seven feet. The ordnance would be arranged with a minimum of eleven gun ports on the upper deck. The lower deck would be provided with four to eight gun ports for heavier guns that could only be used in calm weather. For added propulsion ten oar ports per side would be provided with a central loading port. Nineteen more 32-gun vessels to these specifications were ordered in from 1694 to 1698 with thirteen to be built by contract and nine in dockyard.

== Design and specifications ==
As with most vessels of this time period only order and launch dates are available. The dimensional data listed here is the specification data and the acceptable design creep will be listed on each individual vessel. The gundeck was 108 feet 0 inches (32.9 metres) with a keel length of 88 feet 0 inches (26.8 metres) for tonnage calculation. The breadth would be 28 feet 0 inches (8.5 metres) with a depth of hold of 10 ft 6 in (3.2 m). The tonnage calculation would be 366 92/94 tons. The ships would be sail powered carrying a ship-rigged sail plan. Also there was a provision for ten oar ports per side located between the gun ports on the lower deck. Lyme and Scarborough would be rebuilt to the 1719 establishment for 20-gun vessels. The establishment dimensions were 106 feet 0 inches (32.31 metres) with a keel length of 87 feet 9 inches (26.75 metres) for tonnage calculation. The breadth would be 28 feet 4 inches (8.64 metres) with a depth of hold of 9 feet 2 inches (2.79 metres). The tonnage calculation would be 3740/94 tons (bm).

The gun armament initially was four demi-culverines (Note: A demi-culverine was a gun of 3,400 pounds with a four-inch bore firing a 9.5-pound shot with an eight-pound powder charge.) mounted on wooden trucks on the lower deck (LD) with two pair of guns per side. The upper deck (UD) battery would consist of between twenty and twenty-two sakers (Note: A sacar or saker was a gun of 1,400 pounds with a 3.5-inch bore firing a 5.5-pound shot with a 5.5-pound powder charge.) guns mounted on wooden trucks with ten or eleven guns per side. The gun battery would be completed by four to six minions (Note: A minion was a gun of 1,000 pounds with a 3.5-inch bore firing a 4-pound shot with a 4-pound powder charge.) guns mounted on wooden trucks on the quarterdeck (QD) with two to three guns per side. In the 1703 Establishment the old gun designations would be replaced by a system that designated the guns by the weight of shot fired. The demi-culverines would become known as 9-pounders, the sakers as 6-pounders and the minions as 4-pounders. Therefore, their armament as of 1703 for Shoreham and Sorlings would be listed as four 9-pounder guns on the lower deck (LD), twenty 6-pounder 19 hundredweight (cwt) guns on the upper deck (UD) with four 4-pounder 12 cwt guns on the quarterdeck (QD). For Scarborough, Faversham, Looe(ii) and Bridgewater would be rerated as 36-gun vessels with an increase in the 9-pounders to eight guns. The 4-pounders would be removed in 1714. Under the 1719 Establishment the guns would be established as twenty 6-pounders on the upper deck (UD).

== Ships of the 1694 Programme Group ==
Name	Builder	Launch date	Remarks
Lyme (1695)	Mr Flint, Plymouth	20 April 1695	rebuilt as 1719 Establishment sixth rate in 1720; Breaking completed January 1739
Hastings (1695) (i)	Thomas Ellis, Shoreham	5 February 1695	Wrecked 10 December 1697
Milford (1695)	William Hubbard, Ipswich	6 March 1695	Taken by French 7 January 1697
Arundel (1695)	Thomas Ellis, Shoreham	13 September 1695	sold under AO 11 June 1713
Rye (1696)	Sheerness Dockyard	7 June 1696	sunk as breakwater Harwich 5 July 1727
Scarborough (1696)	James Parker, Southampton	24 March 1696	Captured by French 1 November 1710; Recaptured by British 31 March 1712 and renamed Garland; Reduced to 20-gun sixth rate 1717; rebuilt at Sheerness as sixth rate 24 October 1721; Sold at Sheerness 27 September 1744
Looe (1696) (i)	Plymouth Dockyard	5 August 1696	Wrecked Baltimore Bay, Ireland 30 April 1697
Lynn (1696)	Thomas Ellis, Shoreham	24 April 1696	Sold to Francis Sheldon 16 April 1713
Fowey (1696)	Thomas Burgess & William Briggs, Shoreham	7 May 1696	Taken by French 1 August 1708
Southsea Castle (1696) (i)	John Knowler, Redbridge	3 September 1696	Wrecked 15 September 1697
Gosport (1696)	William Collins, Shoreham	3 September 1696	Taken by French 28 July 1706
Poole (1696)	Joseph Nye & George Moore, East Cowes	6 August 1696	Converted to a fireship at Portsmouth 1719; sunk as a breakwater Harwich 8 July 1737
Feversham (1696)	Thomas Ellis and William Collins, Shoreham	1 October 1696	foundered 7 October 1711
Hastings (1698) (ii)	Isaac Betts, Woodbridge	17 May 1698	Wrecked 9 February 1707
Lowestoffe (1697)	Chatham Dockyard	16 August 1697	Rebuilt as 20-gun sixth rate; Sold on 12 July 1744
Looe (1697) (ii)	Portsmouth Dockyard	15 October 1697	Wrecked 12 December 1705
Southsea Castle (1697) (ii)	Deptford Dockyard	16 November 1697	Wrecked 12 November 1699
Bridgewater (1698)	Sheerness Dockyard	30 May 1698	Converted to a fireship 1727; Broken in April 1738
Ludlow (1698)	Mrs Ann Mundy, Woodbridge	12 September 1698	taken by French 16 January 1703
