= HMS Looe =

Six ships of the Royal Navy have borne the name HMS Looe, after the Cornish town of Looe. A seventh was planned but never completed:

- HMS Looe (1696) was a 32-gun fifth rate launched in 1696 and wrecked in 1697.
- HMS Looe (1697) was a 32-gun fifth rate launched in 1697 and wrecked in 1705.
- HMS Looe (1707) was a 42-gun fifth rate launched in 1707. She was reduced to harbour service in 1735 and was sunk as a breakwater in 1737.
- HMS Looe (1741) was a 44-gun fifth rate launched in 1741 and wrecked in 1744.
- HMS Looe (1745) was a 44-gun fifth rate launched in 1745 and sunk as a breakwater in 1759.
- HMS Looe (1759) was a 30-gun fifth rate, formerly the privateer Liverpool. She was purchased in 1759 and sold in 1763.
- HMS Looe, ex-Beauty built 1924, became a Q-ship in World War II
- HMS Looe was to have been a Bangor-class minesweeper. She was laid down in 1941, renamed HMS Lyemun on the stocks, but was captured that year by the Japanese. She was completed as Nan Yo in 1943, and was lost later that year.
