= HMS Arundel =

A number of ships of the Royal Navy have been named Arundel, after the Sussex town, including -

- HMS Arundel (1695), a fifth rate
- HMS Arundel (1746), a sloop
- HMS Arundel (1776), an unrated cutter
- HMS Arundel (1800), a Dublin-class ship of the line
- HMS Arundel (1802), a Medway-class ship of the line
