= HMS England =

Ship of the line of the Royal Navy

History

Kingdom of England
- Name: HMS England
- Acquired: 19 August 1693
- Commissioned: 1694
- Fate: Taken and sunk by a French squadron 16 February 1695

General characteristics
- Type: 42-gun fifth rate
- Tons burthen: 388 bm
- Length: 93 ft 1 in (28.4 m) gun deck
- Beam: 28 ft 0 in (8.5 m) for tonnage
- Sail plan: ship-rigged
- Armament: 42 guns

HMS England was a 42-gun fifth rate purchased in 1693. She served in the Bristol Channel or North Sea. She was sunk by a French squadron in 1695.

England was the only such named vessel in the Royal Navy.

== Construction ==
She was purchased on 19 August 1693, but is also listed as 'hired' on 5 September 1693.

== Commissioned service ==
She was commissioned in 1694 Under the command of Captain William Cooper, RN, for service in either the North Sea or the Bristol Channel'

== Loss ==
HMS England was taken and sunk by a French squadron off Cape Clear on 16 February 1695 while defending a homebound convoy from the West Indies. Captain Cooper was killed in the battle.
