= HMS Betty (1695) =

Ship of the line of the Royal Navy

History

England
- Name: HMS Betty
- Acquired: 26 April 1695
- Commissioned: 29 April 1695
- Out of service: In French Service; August 1695-February 1696
- Renamed: Betty Prize February 1696
- Fate: Sold 1 October 1702

General characteristics
- Type: 36-gun fifth rate
- Tons burthen: 37165/94 tons (bm)
- Length: 103 ft 0 in (31.39 m) gundeck; 86 ft 0 in (26.21 m) keel for tonnage
- Beam: 28 ft 6 in (8.69 m) for tonnage
- Depth of hold: 11 ft 9 in (3.58 m)
- Sail plan: ship-rigged
- Armament: 36 guns; 8 × short demi-culverins (LD); 20 × 6-pdr guns (UD); 8 × minions (QD)

HMS Betty was purchased on 24 April 1695. She was previously a privateer at Bristol in British service. After commissioning she went to the West Indies on trade protection duties. She was captured by the French while returning in 1695, but was retaken in 1696 by the British. She was again commissioned in British service and served in the Mediterranean, Guinea and carried out surveying work off Ireland. She was sold in 1702.

Betty was the only vessel of that name in the English and Royal Navy.

== Construction and specifications ==
She was purchased on 26 April 1695 as a privateer at Bristol in British service. She was established into the Royal Navy on 29 April 1695. Her dimensions were a gundeck of 109 feet 0 inches (33.22 metres) with a keel of 88 feet 0 inches (26.82 metres) for tonnage calculation with a breadth of 28 feet 8 inches (8.74 metres) and a depth of hold of 10 feet 6 inches (3.20 metres). Her builder's measure tonnage was calculated as 38462/94 tons (burthen).

The gun armament initially was four demi-culverins (Note: A demi-culverin was a gun of 3,400 pounds with a four-inch bore firing a 9.5-pound shot with an eight-pound powder charge) on the lower deck (LD) with two pair of guns per side. The upper deck (UD) battery would consist of between twenty and twenty-two 6-pounder guns (Note: A 6-pounder was a Dutch gun used to replace the saker) with ten or eleven guns per side. The gun battery would be completed by four 4-pounder guns (Note: A minion renamed the 4-pounder was a gun of 1,000 pounds with a 3.5-inch bore firing a 4-pound shot with a 4-pound powder charge.) on the quarterdeck (QD) with two to three guns per side.

== Commissioned service ==
She was commissioned in 1695 under the command of Captain James Powell, RN, for service in the West Indies. She was captured on 14 August 1695 by a French 30-gun privateer while defending a homebound convoy, during which Captain Powell was killed along with 18 members of the crew and 14 wounded. She remained in French hands until 15 February 1696 when she was recaptured by HMS Phoenix and renamed Betty Prize. She reverted to her original name and Commander Thomas Lambert, RN, was placed in command on 4 March 1696. He was promoted to captain on 20 October,. She was patrolling with a detached squadron under the command of Captain Thomas Harlow when on 14 August 1697 they spotted Monsieur de Pointis returning to Brest. They gave chase but the French squadron escaped. She was off Lisbon, Portugal, with Vice-Admiral Lord Matthew Aylmer's Fleet before sailing to the Mediterranean for 1698/99 to re-establish counter-piracy terms with the Moors of North Africa by visiting Tunis, Tripoli and Algier. On 3 March 1701, Captain Peregrine Bertie, RN, took command and sailed to Guinea in Africa, then was doing survey work off Ireland in 1702.

== Disposition ==
HMS Betty was sold by Admiralty Order (AO) September 1702 for £147 (Note: The cost accounting for inflation of approximately £29,600 in reference to today) on 1 October 1702.
