= HMS Ludlow (1698) =

History

England
- Name: HMS Ludlow
- Ordered: 1697
- Builder: Mrs. Anne Mundy, Woodbridge
- Launched: 12 September 1698
- Commissioned: 1699
- Captured: 16 January 1703
- Fate: Captured by French off Goree

General characteristics as built
- Class & type: 32-gun fifth rate
- Tons burthen: 3825/94 tons (bm)
- Length: 108 ft 0 in (32.92 m) gundeck; 90 ft 0 in (27.43 m) keel for tonnage
- Beam: 28 ft 3 in (8.61 m)
- Depth of hold: 10 ft 7 in (3.23 m)
- Propulsion: Sails
- Sail plan: Full-rigged ship
- Complement: 145/110
- Armament: as built 32 guns; 4/4 × demi-culverins (LD); 22/20 × 6-pdr guns (UD); 6/4 × 4-pdr guns (QD)

HMS Ludlow was a 32-gun fifth rate built by Mrs. Anne Mundy of Woodbridge in 1697/98.

She was the first vessel to bear the name Ludlow in the English and Royal Navy.

== Construction and specifications ==
She was ordered in 1697 to be built under contract by Mrs. Anne Mundy of Woodbridge. She was launched on 12 September 1698. Her dimensions were a gundeck of 108 feet 0 inches (32.92 metres) with a keel of 90 feet 0 inches (27.43 metres) for tonnage calculation with a breadth of 28 feet 3 inches (8.61 metres) and a depth of hold of 10 feet 7 inches (3.23 metres). Her builder's measure tonnage was calculated as 3825/94 tons (burthen).

The gun armament initially was four demi-culverins (Note: A demi-culverin was a gun of 3,400 pounds with a four-inch bore firing a 9.5-pound shot with an eight-pound powder charge) on the lower deck (LD) with two pair of guns per side. The upper deck (UD) battery would consist of between twenty and twenty-two 6-pounder guns (Note: A 6-pounder was a Dutch gun used to replace the saker) with ten or eleven guns per side. The gun battery would be completed by four 4-pounder guns (Note: A minion renamed the 4-pounder was a gun of 1,000 pounds with a 3.5-inch bore firing a 4-pound shot with a 4-pound powder charge.) on the quarterdeck (QD) with two to three guns per side.

== Commissioned Service 1699-1703 ==
She was commissioned in 1699 under the command of Captain Henry Lumley for service in North America and in the West Indies. In 1703 he was replaced by Captain William Cock remaining in the West Indies.

== Loss ==
She was taken by the 40-gun Frenchman L' Adroit off Gorre on 16 January 1703 losing 30 personnel killed and wounded.
