= HMS Lynn (1696) =

Royal Navy ship

History

England
- Name: HMS Lynn
- Ordered: 3 May 1695
- Builder: Thomas Ellis, Shoreham
- Launched: 24 April 1696
- Commissioned: 1696
- Fate: Sold to Francis Sheldon 16 April 1713

General characteristics as built
- Class & type: 32-gun fifth rate
- Tons burthen: 37352/94 tons (bm)
- Length: 107 ft 9.5 in (32.85 m) gundeck; 88 ft 0 in (26.82 m) keel for tonnage
- Beam: 28 ft 3 in (8.61 m)
- Depth of hold: 10 ft 8.5 in (3.26 m)
- Propulsion: Sails
- Sail plan: Full-rigged ship
- Complement: 145/110
- Armament: as built 32 guns; 4/4 × demi-culverins (LD); 22/20 × 6-pdr guns (UD); 6/4 × 4-pdr guns (QD)

HMS Lynn was a 32-gun fifth rate built under contract by Thomas Ellis of Shoreham in 1695/96. She spent her entire career on trade protection and anti-piracy patrols. Her service was in Home Waters North America, the West Indies and the East Indies. She was sold in 1713.

She was the first vessel to bear the name Lynn in the English and Royal Navy.

== Construction and specifications ==
She was ordered on 16 February 1694 to be built under contract by Mr. Flint of Plymouth. She was launched on 20 April 1695. Her dimensions were a gundeck of 109 feet 0 inches (33.22 metres) with a keel of 88 feet 0 inches (26.82 metres) for tonnage calculation with a breadth of 28 feet 8 inches (8.74 metres) and a depth of hold of 10 feet 6 inches (3.20 metres). Her builder’s measure tonnage was calculated as 38462/94 tons (burthen).

The gun armament initially was four demi-culverins (Note: A demi-culverin was a gun of 3,400 pounds with a four-inch bore firing a 9.5-pound shot with an eight-pound powder charge) on the lower deck (LD) with two pair of guns per side. The upper deck (UD) battery would consist of between twenty and twenty-two 6-pounder guns (Note: A 6-pounder was a Dutch gun used to replace the saker) with ten or eleven guns per side. The gun battery would be completed by four 4-pounder guns (Note: A minion renamed the 4-pounder was a gun of 1,000 pounds with a 3.5-inch bore firing a 4-pound shot with a 4-pound powder charge.) on the quarterdeck (QD) with two to three guns per side.

== Commissioned Service 1696-1712 ==
HMS Lynn was commissioned in 1696 under the command of Captain Horatio Townsend for service in Irish Waters in 1697. In 1698 she went to the West Indies where Captain Townsend died on 12 March 1699. Captain Edmund Letchmere took command following his death on 16 March 1699 and was assigned to Sir George Rooke's Fleet. Captain Letchmere was reappointed on 9 July 1700 then again on 26 May 1701. Captain John Watkins was in command in 1702. Between 1704 and 1705 Captain George Martin was in Command in the Leeward Islands. On 16 July 1706 Captain Sir George Forbes, the Earl of Grannard was assigned command. Captain Archibald Hamilton was in command at Barbados on 12 January 1707. On 28 February 1709 she was assigned Captain Henry Blinston as her commander for service in the Mediterranean. She sailed with Baker's squadron on the Portuguese coast in 1712.

== Disposition ==
She was sold to Francis Sheldon for £195 (Note: A total cost accounting for inflation of approximately £34,600 in today's money) on 16 April 1713.
