= HMS Hastings (1695) =

History

England
- Name: HMS Hastings
- Ordered: 2 April 1694
- Builder: Thomas Ellis, Shoreham
- Launched: 5 February 1695
- Commissioned: 18 June 1695
- Fate: Wrecked in storm off Waterford 10 December 1697

General characteristics as built
- Class & type: 32-gun fifth rate
- Tons burthen: 38390/94 tons (bm)
- Length: 108 ft 8 in (33.12 m) gundeck; 90 ft 9 in (27.66 m) keel for tonnage
- Beam: 28 ft 2.5 in (8.60 m)
- Depth of hold: 10 ft 7.5 in (3.24 m)
- Propulsion: Sails
- Sail plan: Full-rigged ship
- Complement: 145/110
- Armament: as built 32 guns; 4/4 × demi-culverins (LD); 22/20 × 6-pdr guns (UD); 6/4 × 4-pdr guns (QD)

HMS Hastings was a 32-gun fifth rate built under contract by Thomas Ellis of Shoreham in 1694/95. She spent her brief career on counter piracy patrols and trade protection duties in Home Waters. She was wrecked in a storm off Waterford in December 1697.

She was the first vessel to carry the name Hastings in the English and Royal Navy.

== Construction and specifications ==
She was ordered on 2 April 1694 to be built under contract by Thomas Ellis of Shoreham. She was launched on 5 February 1695. Her dimensions were a gundeck of 108 feet 8 inches (33.12 metres) with a keel of 90 feet 9 inches (27.66 metres) for tonnage calculation with a breadth of 28 feet 2.5 inches (8.60 metres) and a depth of hold of 10 feet 7.5 inches (3.24 metres). Her builder’s measure tonnage was calculated as 38390/94 tons (burthen).

The gun armament initially was four demi-culverins (Note: A demi-culverin was a gun of 3,400 pounds with a four-inch bore firing a 9.5-pound shot with an eight-pound powder charge) on the lower deck (LD) with two pair of guns per side. The upper deck (UD) battery would consist of between twenty and twenty-two 6-pounder guns (Note: A 6-pounder was a Dutch gun used to replace the saker) with ten or eleven guns per side. The gun battery would be completed by four 4-pounder guns (Note: A minion renamed the 4-pounder was a gun of 1,000 pounds with a 3.5-inch bore firing a 4-pound shot with a 4-pound powder charge.) on the quarterdeck (QD) with two to three guns per side.

== Commissioned Service 1695-1697 ==
HMS Hastings was commissioned on 18 June 1695 under the command of Captain John Draper for service in the West Indies. She returned to Home Waters with a convoy. She was assigned to Irish Waters in 1696. In 1697 she was escorting timber ships to Kinsale, Ireland.

== Loss ==
She was wrecked in a storm off Waterford on 10 December 1697 with the loss of all hands.
