= HMS Hastings (1698) =

Royal Navy warship

History

England
- Name: HMS Hastings
- Ordered: 1696
- Builder: Isaac Betts, Woodbridge
- Launched: 17 May 1698
- Commissioned: 1698
- Fate: Wrecked in a storm near Great Yarmouth 9 February 1707

General characteristics as built
- Class & type: 32-gun fifth rate
- Tons burthen: 38132/94 tons (bm)
- Length: 108 ft 4 in (33.02 m) gundeck; 89 ft 10 in (27.38 m) keel for tonnage
- Beam: 28 ft 3 in (8.61 m)
- Depth of hold: 10 ft 6 in (3.20 m)
- Propulsion: Sails
- Sail plan: Full-rigged ship
- Complement: 145/110
- Armament: as built 32 guns; 4/4 × demi-culverins (LD); 22/20 × 6-pdr guns (UD); 6/4 × 4-pdr guns (QD)

HMS Hastings was a 32-gun fifth rate built by Isaac Betts of Woodbridge in 1696/98. She was employed in convoy service, trade protection and counter piracy patrols. She was wrecked off Greater Yarmouth in February 1707.

She was the second vessel to bear the name Hastings since it was used for a 32-gun fifth rate built by Thomas Ellis of Shoreham on 5 February 1695 then wrecked 1697 off Waterford.

== Construction and specifications ==
She was ordered on 1696 to be built under contract by Isaac Betts of Woodbridge. She was launched on 17 May 1698. Her dimensions were a gundeck of 108 feet 4 inches (33.02 metres) with a keel of 89 feet 10 inches (27.38 metres) for tonnage calculation with a breadth of 28 feet 3 inches (8.61 metres) and a depth of hold of 10 feet 6 inches (3.20 metres). Her builder's measure tonnage was calculated as 38132/94 tons (burthen).

The gun armament initially was four demi-culverins (Note: A demi-culverin was a gun of 3,400 pounds with a four-inch bore firing a 9.5-pound shot with an eight-pound powder charge) on the lower deck (LD) with two pair of guns per side. The upper deck (UD) battery would consist of between twenty and twenty-two 6-pounder guns (Note: A 6-pounder was a Dutch gun used to replace the saker) with ten or eleven guns per side. The gun battery would be completed by four 4-pounder guns (Note: A minion renamed the 4-pounder was a gun of 1,000 pounds with a 3.5-inch bore firing a 4-pound shot with a 4-pound powder charge.) on the quarterdeck (QD) with two to three guns per side.

== Commissioned Service 1698-1707 ==
She was commissioned in 1698 under the command of Captain Richard White (died 7 July 1700). She sailed in early 1699 for the East Indies. Captain Edward Rumsey took command on 1 September 1699 to return to Home Waters. In 1702 she was under Captain Richard Culliford for patrolling the Bristol Channel. He was followed by Captain Thomas Kenney in 1703. Captain Charles Parsons took command on 6 April 1704 then Captain Philip Stanhope on 7 November 1704. She sailed to Guinea on the east coast of Africa in 1705. Later that year Commander Francis Vaughan took command for convoy service in the North Sea.

== Loss ==
She was wrecked in a storm near Great Yarmouth on 9 February 1707. Only 24 personnel survived the sinking. Captain Vaughan was drowned in the mishap.
