= HMS Fowey (1696) =

32-gun frigate of the Royal Navy

History

England
- Name: HMS Fowey
- Ordered: 3 May 1695
- Builder: Thomas Burges & William Briggs, Shoreham
- Launched: 7 May 1696
- Commissioned: 1696
- Captured: 1 August 1704
- Fate: Taken by a squadron of seven French privateers

General characteristics as built
- Class & type: 32-gun fifth rate
- Tons burthen: 37748/94 tons (bm)
- Length: 108 ft 0 in (32.92 m) gundeck; 89 ft 5.5 in (27.27 m) keel for tonnage
- Beam: 28 ft 2 in (8.59 m)
- Depth of hold: 10 ft 6.5 in (3.21 m)
- Propulsion: Sails
- Sail plan: Full-rigged ship
- Complement: 145/110
- Armament: as built 32 guns; 4/4 × demi-culverins (LD); 22/20 × 6-pdr guns (UD); 6/4 × 4-pdr guns (QD)

HMS Fowey was a 32-gun fifth rate built by Mr. Flint of Plymouth in 1695/96. She was employed in trade protection and counter-piracy patrols in Home Waters and North America. She was in on the capture of a 50-gun Frenchman while returning from Virginia. She was taken by the French off the Scilly Islands in August 1704.

She was the first vessel to bear the name Fowey in the English and Royal Navy.

== Construction and specifications ==
She was ordered on 3 May 1695 to be built under contract by Thomas Burgess and William Briggs of Shoreham. She was launched on 7 May 1696. Her dimensions were a gundeck of 108 feet 0 inches (32.92 metres) with a keel of 89 feet 5.5 inches (27.27 metres) for tonnage calculation with a breadth of 28 feet 2 inches (8.59 metres) and a depth of hold of 10 feet 6.5 inches (3.21 metres). Her builder's measure tonnage was calculated as 37748/94 tons (burthen).

The gun armament initially was four demi-culverins (Note: A demi-culverin was a gun of 3,400 pounds with a four-inch bore firing a 9.5-pound shot with an eight-pound powder charge) on the lower deck (LD) with two pair of guns per side. The upper deck (UD) battery would consist of between twenty and twenty-two 6-pounder guns (Note: A 6-pounder was a Dutch gun used to replace the saker) with ten or eleven guns per side. The gun battery would be completed by four 4-pounder guns (Note: A minion renamed the 4-pounder was a gun of 1,000 pounds with a 3.5-inch bore firing a 4-pound shot with a 4-pound powder charge.) on the quarterdeck (QD) with two to three guns per side.

== Commissioned service 1696-1704 ==
She was commissioned in 1696 under the command of Captain Charles Brittiff. In 1697 sge was under Captain Richard Culliford and stationed at the Nore in the mouth of the River Thames. She sailed to New York in 1698. In 1700 she came under the command of Commander Thomas Legge for service in North America and the West Indies. In 1703, Captain Richard Browne assumed command. In concert with the 60-gun Dreadnought and the 50-gun Falkland She took a 50-gun ship in June 1704. She sailed with a Virginia convoy in 1704.

== Loss ==
She was taken by a squadron of seven French privateers off the Isles of Scilly on 12 August 1704.

=== In French Service 1704-1711 ===
The French recorded dimensions were a length of 104 feet (32 meters) with a breadth of 26 feet (7.9 meters) and a depth of hold of 10 feet (3.0 meters). Her calculated tonnage was 250 tons. She had a draught of 12 to 12.5 feet (3.7 to 3.8 meters). Her armament in French service was four 12-pounder guns on the lower deck, with twenty 6-pounder guns on the upper deck, and six 3-pounder guns on the quarterdeck. Her manning was between 160/150 men with 4/5 officers.

In French service she was renamed Le Fouey and spent her time in coast guard service with the French Navy. She was hulked at Brest in 1713 and broken in 1720.
