= HMS Bridgewater (1698) =

History

England
- Name: HMS Bridgewater
- Ordered: 15 February 1697
- Builder: Sheerness Dockyard
- Launched: 30 May 1698
- Commissioned: 1699
- Fate: Broken at Deptford in April 1738

General characteristics as built
- Class & type: 32-gun fifth rate
- Tons burthen: 41137/94 tons (bm)
- Length: 110 ft 5 in (33.66 m) gundeck; 90 ft 11 in (27.71 m) keel for tonnage
- Beam: 29 ft 2 in (8.89 m)
- Depth of hold: 11 ft 5.5 in (3.49 m)
- Propulsion: Sails
- Sail plan: Full-rigged ship
- Complement: 145/110
- Armament: as built 32 guns; 4/4 × demi-culverins (LD); 22/20 × 6-pdr guns (UD); 6/4 × 4-pdr guns (QD)

HMS Bridgewater was a 32-gun fifth rate built at Sheerness Dockyard in 1697/98.

She was the second vessel to bear the name Bridgewater since it was used for a 58-gun ship built at Deptford in 1654, renamed Anne in May 1660 and blown up at Sheerness on 2 December 1673.

== Construction and specifications ==
She was ordered on 15 February 1697 to be built at Sheerness Dockyard under the guidance of Master Shipwright Robert Shortiss. She was launched on 30 May 1698. Her dimensions were a gundeck of 110 feet 5 inches (33.66 metres) with a keel of 90 feet 11 inches (27.71 metres) for tonnage calculation with a breadth of 29 feet 2 inches (8.89 metres) and a depth of hold of 11 feet 5.5 inches (3.49 metres). Her builder's measure tonnage was calculated as 41137/94 tons (burthen).

The gun armament initially was four demi-culverins (Note: A demi-culverin was a gun of 3,400 pounds with a four-inch bore firing a 9.5-pound shot with an eight-pound powder charge) on the lower deck (LD) with two pair of guns per side. The upper deck (UD) battery would consist of between twenty and twenty-two 6-pounder guns (Note: A 6-pounder was a Dutch gun used to replace the saker) with ten or eleven guns per side. The gun battery would be completed by four 4-pounder guns (Note: A minion renamed the 4-pounder was a gun of 1,000 pounds with a 3.5-inch bore firing a 4-pound shot with a 4-pound powder charge.) on the quarterdeck (QD) with two to three guns per side.

== Commissioned Service 1699-1738 ==
HMS Bridgewater was commissioned in 1699 under the command of Captain Thomas Dilkes for service in Irish Waters. In 1702 she was under Captain Richard Griffith followed by Captain Thomas Lawrence in October 1704. She remained in Irish waters. She was in action against two privateers off Kinsale, Ireland on 16 May 1705. Captain Walter Pigot was in command in 1707 still in Irish Waters, In 1711 she escorted a Russian convoy. She underwent a large repair at Chatham in 1712. Captain John Fletcher was in command in 1715 for service in the English Channel. She sailed to the Mediterranean and Sale, Morocco in 1717.

She was repaired at Woolwich at a cost of £2,251.10.8.5d (Note: A total cost accounting for inflation of approximately £425,600 in today's money) between February and June 1718 then was placed in Ordinary. She was converted by Admiralty Order (AO) March 1727 to a 8-gun fireship with a crew of 55 personnel at Woolwich Dockyard in March/April 1727. She was recommissioned in 1727 under Captain John Temple for service with Sir Charles Wager's Fleet in the Baltic. She was fitted at Sheerness for £854.6.0d (Note: A total cost accounting for inflation of approximately £182,600 in today's money) in June/July 1732. She was fitted at Sheerness for £415.14.1d (Note: A total cost accounting for inflation of approximately £81,000 in today's money) in March/April 1734. She was commissioned un Commander Deorge Peacock (until 1737) for service with Sir John Norris's Fleet. She was repaired at Sheerness for £272.10.7d (Note: A total cost accounting for inflation of approximately £50,800 in today's money) in December 1736 then assigned as guard ship at Sheerness.

== Disposition ==
She was broken at Deptford Dockyard in April 1738.
