= HMS Milford (1695) =

History

England
- Name: HMS Milford
- Ordered: 17 May 1694
- Builder: William Hubbard, Ipswich
- Launched: 6 March 1695
- Commissioned: 1695
- Renamed: Le Milford
- Captured: 7 January 1697
- Fate: Captured by five French ships

General characteristics as built
- Class & type: 32-gun fifth rate
- Tons burthen: 38390/94 tons (bm)
- Length: 107 ft 10 in (32.87 m) gundeck; 90 ft 2.25 in (27.49 m) keel for tonnage
- Beam: 28 ft 4.5 in (8.65 m)
- Depth of hold: 10 ft 7.5 in (3.24 m)
- Propulsion: Sails
- Sail plan: Full-rigged ship
- Complement: 145/110
- Armament: as built 32 guns; 4/4 × demi-culverins (LD); 22/20 × 6-pdr guns (UD); 6/4 × 4-pdr guns (QD)

HMS Milford was a 32-gun fifth rate built under contract by William Hubbard of Ipswich in 1694/95.

She was the third vessel to carry the name Milford since it was first used for a similar vessel in 1660. Her predecessor was a 32-gun fifth rate built at Woolwich Dockyard on 30 March 1690 and captured by the French in the North Sea in November 1693.

== Construction and specifications ==
She was ordered on 17 May 1694 to be built under contract by William Hubbard of Ipswich. She was launched on 6 March 1695. Her dimensions were a gundeck of 107 feet 10 inches (32.87 metres) with a keel of 90 feet 2.25 inches (27.49 metres) for tonnage calculation with a breadth of 28 feet 4.5 inches (8.65 metres) and a depth of hold of 10 feet 7.5 inches (3.24 metres). Her builder's measure tonnage was calculated as 38623/94 tons (burthen).

The gun armament initially was four demi-culverins (Note: A demi-culverin was a gun of 3,400 pounds with a four-inch bore firing a 9.5-pound shot with an eight-pound powder charge) on the lower deck (LD) with two pair of guns per side. The upper deck (UD) battery contained between twenty and twenty-two 6-pounder guns (Note: A 6-pounder was a Dutch gun used to replace the saker), with ten or eleven guns per side. The gun battery would be completed by four 4-pounder guns (Note: A minion renamed the 4-pounder was a gun of 1,000 pounds with a 3.5-inch bore firing a 4-pound shot with a 4-pound powder charge.) on the quarterdeck (QD), with two to three guns per side.

== Commissioned Service 1695-1697 ==
HMS Milford was commissioned in 1695 under the command of Captain Thomas Lyell for service in the North Sea on Fishery protection.

== Loss ==
She was taken by five French ships while on passage from Great Yarmouth to Holland on 7 January 1697. She was incorporated into French Service as Le Milfort until 1720.
