= HMS Southsea Castle (1696) =

History

England
- Name: HMS Southsea Castle
- Ordered: 3 May 1695
- Builder: John Knowler, Redbridge (Southampton)
- Launched: 1 August 1696
- Commissioned: 1696
- Fate: Wrecked on the Dove Sands off Hoylake (Wirral) on 15 September 1697

General characteristics as built
- Class & type: 32-gun fifth rate
- Tons burthen: 3736/94 tons (bm)
- Length: 106 ft 6 in (32.46 m) gundeck; 88 ft 8 in (27.03 m) keel for tonnage
- Beam: 28 ft 1.5 in (8.57 m)
- Depth of hold: 10 ft 8.5 in (3.26 m)
- Propulsion: Sails
- Sail plan: Full-rigged ship
- Complement: 145/110
- Armament: as built 32 guns; 4/4 × demi-culverins (LD); 22/20 × 6-pdr guns (UD); 6/4 × 4-pdr guns (QD)

HMS Southsea Castle was a 32-gun fifth rate built under contract by John Knowler of Redbridge (Southampton) in 1695/96.

She was the first vessel to bear the name Southsea Castle in the English and Royal Navy.

== Construction and specifications ==
She was ordered on 3 May 1695 to be built under contract by John Knowler of Redbridge (Southampton). She was launched on 1 August 1696. Her dimensions were a gundeck of 106 feet 6 inches (32.46 metres) with a keel of 88 feet 8 inches (27.03 metres) for tonnage calculation with a breadth of 28 feet 1.5 inches (8.57 metres) and a depth of hold of 10 feet 8.5 inches (3.26 metres). Her builder's measure tonnage was calculated as 3736/94 tons (burthen).

The gun armament initially was four demi-culverins (Note: A demi-culverin was a gun of 3,400 pounds with a four-inch bore firing a 9.5-pound shot with an eight-pound powder charge) on the lower deck (LD) with two pair of guns per side. The upper deck (UD) battery would consist of between twenty and twenty-two 6-pounder guns (Note: A 6-pounder was a Dutch gun used to replace the saker) with ten or eleven guns per side. The gun battery would be completed by four 4-pounder guns (Note: A minion renamed the 4-pounder was a gun of 1,000 pounds with a 3.5-inch bore firing a 4-pound shot with a 4-pound powder charge.) on the quarterdeck (QD) with two to three guns per side.

== Commissioned Service 1696-1697 ==
She was commissioned in 1696 under the command of Captain Samuel Whitaker. In 1697 she was under Commander Thomas Legge to sail with a Virginia bound convoy.

== Loss ==
She was wrecked on the Dove Sands off Hoylake (Wirral) on 15 September 1697.
