= HMS Looe (1696) =

History

England
- Name: HMS Looe
- Ordered: 1 April 1695
- Builder: Plymouth Dockyard
- Launched: 5 August 1696
- Commissioned: 1697
- Fate: Wrecked in Baltimore Bay, Ireland 30 April 1697

General characteristics as built
- Class & type: 32-gun fifth rate
- Tons burthen: 38480/94 tons (bm)
- Length: 110 ft 0 in (33.53 m) gundeck; 93 ft 0 in (28.35 m) keel for tonnage
- Beam: 28 ft 0 in (8.53 m)
- Depth of hold: 11 ft 0 in (3.35 m)
- Propulsion: Sails
- Sail plan: Full-rigged ship
- Complement: 145/110
- Armament: as built 32 guns; 4/4 × demi-culverins (LD); 22/20 × 6-pdr guns (UD); 6/4 × 4-pdr guns (QD)

HMS Looe was a 32-gun fifth rate built at Plymouth Dockyard in 1695/96. Shortly after commissioning she was wrecked in Baltimore Bay, Ireland on 30 April 1697.

She was the first vessel to bear the name Looe in the English and Royal Navy.

== Construction and specifications ==
She was ordered on 1 April 1695 to be built at Plymouth Dockyard under the guidance of Master Shipwright Elias Waffe. She was launched on 5 August 1696. Her dimensions were a gundeck of 110 feet 0 inches (33.53 metres) with a keel of 93 feet 0 inches (28.35 metres) for tonnage calculation with a breadth of 28 feet 0 inches (8.53 metres) and a depth of hold of 11 feet 0 inches (3.35 metres). Her builder’s measure tonnage was calculated as 38480/94 tons (burthen).

The gun armament initially was four demi-culverins (Note: A demi-culverin was a gun of 3,400 pounds with a four-inch bore firing a 9.5-pound shot with an eight-pound powder charge) on the lower deck (LD) with two pairs of guns per side. The upper deck (UD) battery would consist of between twenty and twenty-two 6-pounder guns (Note: A 6-pounder was a Dutch gun used to replace the saker) with ten or eleven guns per side. The gun battery would be completed by four 4-pounder guns (Note: A minion renamed the 4-pounder was a gun of 1,000 pounds with a 3.5-inch bore firing a 4-pound shot with a 4-pound powder charge.) on the quarterdeck (QD) with two to three guns per side.

== Commissioned service 1697 ==
She was commissioned in 1697 under the command of Captain Richard Paul for service in the English Channel.

== Loss ==
She was wrecked in Baltimore Bay, Ireland on 30 April 1697.
