= HMS Arundel (1695) =

British Ocean Liner

History

England
- Name: HMS Arundel
- Ordered: 24 December 1694
- Builder: Thomas Ellis, Shoreham
- Launched: 13 September 1695
- Commissioned: 1695
- Fate: Sold to John Mackpheadras by AO 11 June 1713

General characteristics as built
- Class & type: 32-gun fifth rate
- Tons burthen: 37771/94 tons (bm)
- Length: 108 ft 7 in (33.10 m) gundeck; 90 ft 7 in (27.61 m) keel for tonnage
- Beam: 28 ft 0 in (8.53 m)
- Depth of hold: 10 ft 6 in (3.20 m)
- Propulsion: Sails
- Sail plan: Full-rigged ship
- Complement: 145/110
- Armament: as built 32 guns; 4/4 × demi-culverins (LD); 22/20 × 6-pdr guns (UD); 6/4 × 4-pdr guns (QD)

HMS Arundel was a 32-gun fifth rate built by Thomas Ellis of Shoreham in 1694/95. After commissioning she was used as a convoy escort, trade protection and counter piracy operations. Her main areas of operation were Irish Waters, the English Channel and convoy escorts to Newfoundland and the West Indies. She was sold in June 1713.

She was the first vessel to carry the name Arundel in the English and Royal Navy.

== Construction and specifications ==
She was ordered on 16 February 1694 to be built under contract by Mr. Flint of Plymouth. She was launched on 20 April 1695. Her dimensions were a gundeck of 108 feet 7 inches (33.10 metres) with a keel of 90 feet 7 inches (27.61 metres) for tonnage calculation with a breadth of 28 feet 0 inches (8.53 metres) and a depth of hold of 10 feet 6 inches (3.20 metres). Her builder’s measure tonnage was calculated as 37771/94 tons (burthen).

The gun armament initially was four demi-culverins (Note: A demi-culverin was a gun of 3,400 pounds with a four-inch bore firing a 9.5-pound shot with an eight-pound powder charge) on the lower deck (LD) with two pair of guns per side. The upper-deck (UD) battery would consist of between twenty and twenty-two 6-pounder guns (Note: A 6-pounder was a Dutch gun used to replace the saker) with ten or eleven guns per side. The gun battery would be completed by four 4-pounder guns (Note: A minion renamed the 4-pounder was a gun of 1,000 pounds with a 3.5-inch bore firing a 4-pound shot with a 4-pound powder charge.) on the quarterdeck (QD) with two to three guns per side.

== Commissioned Service 1695-1713 ==
HMS Arundel was commissioned in 1695 under the command of Captain William Higgins for service in New England. Captain Higgins died on 16 June 1698. After his passing Captain Josiah Crow took command and went to Newfoundland in 1699 then on to North America and the West Indies in 1700. 1702 saw Captain John Ward take command for service in Irish Waters. On 4 March she was under Captain Unton Dering (until his death on 16 November 1706). He was followed by Captain Joseph Winder from 1 December 1706 until 1710. both served in Irish Waters. In 1709 she was assigned to the English Channel then went to the West Indies for convoy service in 1710. On 25 January she was under the command of Captain Andrew Douglas sailing with a convoy to Newfoundland in 1711. On her return she was assigned to the English Channel.

== Disposition ==
She was sold to John Mackpheadras for 315 by Admiralty Order (AO) 11 June 1713.
