= HMS Looe (1697) =

English 32-gun fifth rate

History

England
- Name: HMS Looe
- Ordered: 24 December 1696
- Builder: Portsmouth Dockyard
- Launched: 15 October 1697
- Commissioned: 1697
- Fate: Wrecked in Scratchwell Bay 12 December 1705

General characteristics as built
- Class & type: 32-gun fifth rate
- Tons burthen: 38963/94 tons (bm)
- Length: 108 ft 1 in (32.94 m) gundeck; 89 ft 8 in (27.33 m) keel for tonnage
- Beam: 28 ft 7 in (8.71 m)
- Depth of hold: 11 ft 1 in (3.38 m)
- Propulsion: Sails
- Sail plan: Full-rigged ship
- Complement: 145/110
- Armament: as built 32 guns; 4/4 × demi-culverins (LD); 22/20 × 6-pdr guns (UD); 6/4 × 4-pdr guns (QD)

HMS Looe was a 32-gun fifth rate built by Portsmouth Dockyard in 1696/97. She was first employed off the Irish coast. She went to Newfoundland in 1702. On her return she was wrecked on the Isle of Wight in December 1705.

She was the second vessel to bear the name Looe since it was used for a 32-gun fifth rate built at Plymouth in 1696 and wrecked in Baltimore Bay, Ireland, on 30 April 1697.

== Construction and specifications ==
She was ordered on 24 December 1696 to be built at Portsmouth Dockyard under the guidance of Master Shipwright William Bagwell. She was launched on 15 October 1697. Her dimensions were a gundeck of 108 feet 1 inch (32.94 metres) with a keel of 89 feet 8 inches (27.33 metres) for tonnage calculation with a breadth of 28 feet 7 inches (8.71 metres) and a depth of hold of 11 feet 1 inch (3.38 metres). Her builder's measure tonnage was calculated as 38963/94 tons (burthen).

The gun armament initially was four demi-culverins (Note: A demi-culverin was a gun of 3,400 pounds with a four-inch bore firing a 9.5-pound shot with an eight-pound powder charge) on the lower deck (LD) with two pair of guns per side. The upper deck (UD) battery would consist of between twenty and twenty-two 6-pounder guns (Note: A 6-pounder was a Dutch gun used to replace the saker) with ten or eleven guns per side. The gun battery would be completed by four 4-pounder guns (Note: A minion renamed the 4-pounder was a gun of 1,000 pounds with a 3.5-inch bore firing a 4-pound shot with a 4-pound powder charge.) on the quarterdeck (QD) with two to three guns per side.

== Commissioned Service 1697-1705 ==
HMS Looe was commissioned in 1697 under Captain Robert Arris for service on the Irish coast. In Late 1702 she was under Captain Timothy Bridges for Captain John Leake's Squadron for a deployment to Newfoundland. The squadron sailed on 23 July from Plymouth arriving at the Bay of Bulls (St John's) on August 27. There being no French vessels, he collect several small prizes. By the Enf of October he took twenty-nine ships, burnt two and demolished St Peter's Fort.

== Loss ==
While returning with a homebound convoy she was wrecked in Scratchwell Bay on the Ilse of Wight on 12 December 1705. Eight member of her crew were drowned in the mishap.
