= Milford =

Milford may refer to:

== Place names ==
=== Canada ===
- Milford (Annapolis), Nova Scotia
- Milford (Halifax), Nova Scotia
- Milford, Ontario

=== England ===
- Milford, Derbyshire
- Milford, Devon, a place in Devon
- Milford on Sea, Hampshire
- Milford, Shropshire, a place in Shropshire
- Milford, Staffordshire
- Milford, Surrey
  - served by Milford railway station
- Milford, Wiltshire

=== Ireland ===
- Milford, County Cork
- Milford, County Donegal

=== New Zealand ===
- Milford Sound
- Milford Track
- Milford, New Zealand, a suburb of Auckland

=== Northern Ireland ===
- Milford, County Armagh

=== Wales ===
- Milford, Powys, a location
- Milford Haven, Pembrokeshire

=== United States ===
- Milford, California
- Milford, Connecticut
  - Milford station (Connecticut), commuter rail station
- Milford, Delaware
- Milford Hundred, an unincorporated subdivision of Kent County, Delaware
- Milford, Georgia
- Milford, Illinois
- Milford, Decatur County, Indiana
- Milford, Kosciusko County, Indiana
- Milford, Iowa
- Milford, Kansas
- Milford, Kentucky
- Milford, Maine, a New England town
  - Milford (CDP), Maine, the main village in the town
- Milford, Massachusetts, a New England town
  - Milford (CDP), Massachusetts, the urban part of the town
- Milford, Michigan
- Milford, Missouri
- Milford, Nebraska
- Milford, New Hampshire, a New England town
  - Milford (CDP), New Hampshire, the central village in the town
- Milford, New Jersey
- Milford, New York, a town
  - Milford (village), New York, within the town
- Milford (Camden, North Carolina), NRHP-listed historic site
- Milford, Ohio
- Milford, Pennsylvania
- Milford, Texas
- Milford, Utah
- Milford, Virginia
- Milford, Wisconsin, a town
  - Milford (community), Wisconsin, an unincorporated community

== People ==
- Milford (name), list of people and fictional characters

== Ships ==
- Milford (ship), four commercial vessels
- HMS Milford, nine ships of the Royal Navy
- RMAS Milford (A91), a tender of the Royal Maritime Auxiliary Service
- SS Milford, later SS Salamanca, a Hong Kong cargo ship in service 1961-1967
- USNS Milford (T-AG-187), a cancelled Forward Depot Ship of the US Navy

== Other uses ==
- Milford F.C., former Irish football league club
- Milford F.C. (South Africa), football club in South Africa
- Milford (crater), on Mars
- Milford Magazine, a bi-monthly publication in Milford, Pennsylvania
- Milford Writer's Workshop

== See also ==
- East Milford, Nova Scotia, Canada
- Milford Haven, Pembrokeshire, Wales
- Milford High School (disambiguation)
- Milford Lake, Kansas
- Milford Parkway (disambiguation)
- Milford Station, Nova Scotia, Canada
- Milford Township (disambiguation)
- Millford (disambiguation)
- New Milford (disambiguation)
- South Milford, North Yorkshire, England
- South Milford, Indiana
- West Milford, New Jersey
- West Milford, West Virginia
