= MHS =

MHS may refer to:

== Schools ==
- Malibu High School, Malibu, California, US
- Marianas High School, Saipan, CNMI, US
- Marryatville High School, Adelaide, Australia
- Marshwood High School, South Berwick, Maine, US
- Massapequa High School, Massapequa, New York, US
- Matthew Humberstone School, Cleethorpes, England
- Mauldin High School, Mauldin, South Carolina, US
- Leodis V. McDaniel High School, Portland, Oregon, US
- McDonald High School, McDonald, Ohio, US
- Maurice J. McDonough High School, Pomfret, Maryland, US
- McMinnville High School, McMinnville, Oregon, US
- Melbourne High School, Melbourne, Australia
- Memorial High School, Hedwig Village, Texas, US
- Milford Haven School, Milford Haven, Wales
- Millburn High School, Millburn, New Jersey, US
- Milpitas High School, Milpitas, California, US
- Moscow High School, Moscow, Idaho, US
- Muscatine High School, Muscatine, Iowa, US
- Marysville High School (disambiguation)
- Milford High School (disambiguation)
- Montpelier High School (disambiguation)

== Other uses ==
- Air Memphis (ICAO code: MHS), an Egyptian airline
- Ingenuity (helicopter), formerly known as Mars Helicopter Scout
- Master of Health Science, a graduate degree program
- Meadowhall Interchange, a railway station in England, National Rail station code
- Message Handling System, a past Novell email protocol
- Michigan Humane Society, in animal welfare
- Microwave Humidity Sounder, satellite-borne instrument
- Mietshäuser Syndikat, a federated network of collectively owned houses in Germany
- Military Health System, of US DoD
- Modular Handgun System
- Montana Historical Society

== See also ==
- Mental health service (disambiguation)
