= 1693 Programme Group =

Class overview
- Name: 1693 Programme Group
- Builders: Woolwich Dockyard; Thomas Ellis, Shoreham; Richard Barrett, Shoreham; Mrs. Ann Wyatt, Redbridge (Southampton)
- Operators: Kingdom of England; Kingdom of Great Britain after 1707
- Preceded by: 1689 Programme Group
- Succeeded by: 1694 Programme Group
- Built: 1693-1694
- In service: 1694-1741
- Completed: 4
- Lost: 1
- Retired: 3

General characteristics Specifications
- Type: 32-gun fifth rate
- Tons burthen: 35444/94 tons (bm)
- Length: 103 ft 9 in (31.62 m) gundeck; 85 ft 0 in (25.91 m) keel for tonnage
- Beam: 28 ft 0 in (8.53 m) for tonnage
- Depth of hold: 10 ft 6 in (3.20 m)
- Sail plan: ship-rigged
- Complement: war 155 to 145 personnel; peacetime 110 personnel
- Armament: as built; 4/8 × 4 demi-culverins (LD); 22/20 × sakers (UD); 6/4 × 4 minions (QD); 1703 Establishment; 8/4 × 4 9-pdr guns (LD); 22/20 × 6-pdr guns (UD); 6/4 × 4-pdr guns (QD)
- Notes: 4-pdr guns removed after 1714

The 1693 Programme of fifth rates were derived from the 1689 Programme vessels as demi-batterie ships. The concept was to have one tier of ordnance flush on the upper deck for use in all weathers on a freeboard of at least seven feet. The ordnance would be arranged with a minimum of ten gun ports on the upper deck. The lower deck would be provided with four ports for heavier guns that could only be used in calm weather. For added propulsion ten oar ports per side would be provided with a central loading port. Four 32-gun vessels to these specifications were ordered in early 1693 with three to be built by Contract and one in dockyard.

== Design and specifications ==
As with most vessels of this time period only order and launch dates are available. The dimensional data listed here is the specification data and the acceptable design creep will be listed on each individual vessel. The gundeck was 103 feet 9 inches (31.62 metres) with a keel length of 85 feet 0 inches (25.91 metres) for tonnage calculation. The breadth would be 28 feet 0 inches (8.53 metres) with a depth of hold of 10 feet 6 inches (3.20 metres). The tonnage calculation would be 35444/94 tons (bm). The ships would be sail powered carrying a ship-rigged sail plan. Also there was a provision for ten oar ports per side located between the gun ports on the lower deck. Shoreham would be rebuilt to the 1719 establishment for 20-gun vessels. The establishment dimensions were 106 feet 0 inches (32.31 metres) with a keel length of 87 feet 9 inches (26.75 metres) for tonnage calculation. The breadth would be 28 feet 4 inches (8.64 metres) with a depth of hold of 9 feet 2 inches (2.79 metres). The tonnage calculation would be 3740/94 tons (bm).

The gun armament initially was four demi-culverins (Note: A demi-culverin was a gun of 3,400 pounds with a four-inch bore firing a 9.5-pound shot with an eight-pound powder charge) mounted on wooden trucks on the lower deck (LD) with two pair of guns per side. The upper deck (UD) battery would consist of between twenty and twenty-two sakers (Note: A sacar or saker was a gun of 1,400 pounds with a 3.5-inch bore firing a 5.5-pound shot with a 5.5-pound powder charge.) guns mounted on wooden trucks with ten or eleven guns per side. The gun battery would be completed by four to six minions (Note: A minion was a gun of 1,000 pounds with a 3.5-inch bore firing a 4-pound shot with a 4-pound powder charge.) guns mounted on wooden trucks on the quarterdeck (QD) with two to three guns per side. In the 1703 Establishment the old gun designations would be replaced by a system that designated the guns by the weight of shot fired. The demi-culverins would become known as 9-pounders, the sakers as 6-pounders and the minions as 4-pounders. Therefore, their armament as of 1703 for Shoreham and Sorlings would be listed as four 9-pounder guns on the lower deck (LD), twenty 6-pounder 19 hundredweight (cwt) guns on the upper deck (UD) with four 4-pounder 12 cwt guns on the quarterdeck (QD). For Scarborough (renamed Milford) and Winchelsea would be rerated as 36-gun vessels with an increase in the 9-pounders to eight guns.

== Ships of the 1693 Programme Group ==
Name	Builder	Launch date	Remarks
Shoreham (1694)	Thomas Ellis, Shoreham	6 January 1694	rebuilt as 1719 Establishment sixth rate in 1724; sold in June 1744
Scarborough (1694)	Woolwich Dockyard	3 March 1690	taken by French on 18 July 1694; retaken 15 February 1697 and renamed Milford; Rebuilt at Deptford 1705; Wrecked Cape Corrientes, Cuba on 18 June 1720
Sorlings (1694)	Richard Barrett, Shoreham	19 March 1694	Taken by French 20 October 1705; Retaken February 1711 and sold
Winchelsea (1694)	Mrs Ann Wyatt, Redbridge	13 August 1694	Taken by French 6 June 1706
