= Milford Township, Pennsylvania =

Milford Township is the name of some places in the U.S. state of Pennsylvania:

- Milford Township, Bucks County, Pennsylvania
- Milford Township, Juniata County, Pennsylvania
- Milford Township, Pike County, Pennsylvania
- Milford Township, Somerset County, Pennsylvania

== See also ==
- Milford, New Jersey
- Milford, Pennsylvania, a borough in Pike County
- Lower Milford Township, Pennsylvania
- New Milford Township, Pennsylvania
- Upper Milford Township, Pennsylvania
- Milford (disambiguation)
