= James Armour =

James Brown Armour (1841–1928), usually known as J. B. Armour, was an Irish Presbyterian minister who sought to rally Protestant opinion in the north of Ireland in support of tenant right and against landlordism, and, in his later years, in favour of Irish Home Rule and against threatened unionist resistance to an Irish national parliament.

Rev. James Armour

== Biography ==
Armour was born at Lisboy, near Ballymoney, County Antrim, and was educated at the Royal Belfast Academical Institution and Queen's College, Belfast and Queen's College, Cork, where he studied classics.

In 1869 Armour was appointed minister at Second Ballymoney Presbyterian Church, also known as Trinity Presbyterian Church, where he served until he retired in 1925. Armour founded Ballymoney Intermediate School and lectured at Magee College in Derry.

In 1886 Armour had opposed the first Home Rule Bill. By 1892, having become convinced that unionism was benefiting Anglicans and landowners at the expense of Presbyterians, Armour converted to a pro-home rule position, and endorsed liberal Presbyterian candidates in the election of that year.

The following year, at a specially-convened General Assembly of the Presbyterian Church, Armour moved a pro-home rule amendment. His speech, in which he stated that 'The principle of Home Rule is a Presbyterian principle', caused a sensation, and saw him emerge as the best known Protestant home ruler in Ulster. He was politically outspoken in support of both the Tenant Right movement and Home Rule, and of the controversial proposal for a Catholic university. He felt that politics ought not to divide the Presbyterian Church, but he firmly believed that partition would be disastrous for Ulster.

Armour was confident that a Dublin parliament would help boost the Irish economy and would promote reconciliation between Protestants and Roman Catholics. Jack White, Roger Casement and Armour organised a public meeting in Ballymoney on 24 October 1913 to build support for Home Rule amongst the local Protestant population, but had little success. The speeches at the meeting were subsequently published as a pamphlet called A Protestant Protest.

Following in the footsteps of James MacKnight, Armour was better known throughout Ulster for his local leadership in the Tenant Right campaign of the 1870s. He helped define the aims of the Route Tenants' Defence Association in the "Ballymoney programme".

Armour served on the Senate of Queen's University, Belfast, where he favoured the teaching of the Irish language and scholastic philosophy. He was made honorary chaplain to the Lord Lieutenant during the First World War.

Armour married Jennie Stavely Hamilton, a widow who already had two sons, and had three sons with her, one of whom was William Staveley Armour, who founded the Young Farmers' Clubs of Ulster in 1929.

He died of pneumonia.
