= 1689 Programme Group =

Class overview
- Name: 1689 Programme Group
- Builders: Woolwich Dockyard; Deptford Dockyard; Chatham Dockyard; Sheerness Dockyard; Portsmouth Dockyard
- Operators: Royal Navy
- Preceded by: Mermaid (1651)
- Succeeded by: 1693 Programme Group
- Built: 1689–1691
- In service: 1690–1741
- Completed: 5
- Lost: 3
- Retired: 2

General characteristics
- Type: 32-gun fifth rate
- Tons burthen: 356 70/94 bm
- Length: 105 ft (32 m) gundeck; 92 ft (28 m) keel for tonnage
- Beam: 27 ft (8.2 m) for tonnage
- Depth of hold: 10 ft (3 m)
- Sail plan: ship-rigged
- Armament: as built; 4 × 4 demi-culverines on wooden trucks (LD); 20 × sakers on wooden trucks (UD); 4 × 4 minions on wooden trucks (QD); 1703 Establishment; 4 × 4 9-pdr guns on wooden trucks (LD); 22/20 × 6-pdr guns on wooden trucks (UD); 6/4 × 4-pdr guns on wooden trucks (QD)

The 1689 Programme of fifth rates were devised by Admiral the Earl of Torrington (Arthur Herbert) as the prototype demi-batterie ships of the Royal Navy. The concept was to have one tier of ordnance flush on the upper deck for use in all weathers on a freeboard of at least seven feet. The ordnance would be arranged with a minimum of ten gun ports on the upper deck. The lower deck would be provided with four ports for heavier guns that could only be used in calm weather. For added propulsion ten oar ports per side would be provided with a central loading port. Five new 32-gun vessels to these specifications were ordered from Naval Dockyards in June 1689.

== Design and specifications ==
The construction of the vessels was assigned to Royal dockyards. As with most vessels of this time period only order and launch dates are available. The dimensional data listed here is the specification data and the acceptable design creep will be listed on each individual vessel. The gundeck was 105 feet (32 metres) with a keel length of 92 ft (28 m) for tonnage calculation. The breadth would be 27 ft (8.2 m) with a depth of hold of 10 ft (3 m). The tonnage calculation would be 356 70/94 bm. The ships would be sail powered carrying a ship-rigged sail plan. Also there was a provision for ten oar ports per side located between the gun ports on the upper deck.

The gun armament initially was four demi-culverines (Note: A demi-culverine was a gun of 3,400 pounds with a four-inch bore firing a 9.5-pound shot with an eight-pound powder charge.) mounted on wooden trucks on the lower deck (LD) with two pair of guns per side. The upper deck (UD) battery would consist of between twenty and twenty-two sakers (Note: A sacar or saker was a gun of 1,400 pounds with a 3.5-inch bore firing a 5.5-pound shot with a 5.5-pound powder charge.) guns mounted on wooden trucks with ten or eleven guns per side. The gun battery would be completed by four to six minions (Note: A minion was a gun of 1,000 pounds with a 3.5-inch bore firing a 4-pound shot with a 4-pound powder charge.) guns mounted on wooden trucks on the quarterdeck (QD) with two to three guns per side. In the 1703 Establishment the old gun designations would be replaced by a system that designated the guns by the weight of shot fired. The demi-culverines would become known as 9-pounders, the sakers as 6-pounders and the minions as 4-pounders. Therefore, their armament as of 1703 would be listed as four 9-pounder guns on the lower deck (LD), twenty 6-pounder 19 hundredweight (cwt) guns on the upper deck (UD) with four 4-pounder 12 cwt guns on the quarterdeck (QD). The 4-pounders would be removed in 1714.

== Ships of the 1689 Programme Group ==
Name	Builder	Launch date	Remarks
Experiment (1689)	Chatham Dockyard	17 December 1689	Reduced to sixth rate 1717; rebuilt as 1719 Establishment sixth rate in 1724
Pembroke (1690)	Deptford Dockyard	3 March 1690	taken by French on 23 February 1694 and ran ashore
Milford (1690)	Woolwich Dockyard	18 March 1690	taken by French 1 December 1693
Portsmouth (1690)	Portsmouth Dockyard	13 May 1690	Taken by French 11 October 1696
Sheerness (1691)	Sheerness Dockyard	6 March 1691	Reduced to sixth rate 1717; broken at Deptford 7 March 1730
