= Mile End (disambiguation) =

Mile End is a district in Tower Hamlets, London, England.

Mile End may also refer to:

- Mile End (London County Council constituency)
- Mile End (UK Parliament constituency)
- Mile End tube station
- Mile End, Cambridgeshire, a location in England
- Mile End, Cheshire, England
- Mile End, Devon, England
- Mile End, Gloucestershire, a small village near Coleford, England
- Mile End, Montreal, Canada
- Mile End, South Australia, Australia
- Mile End, Suffolk, a location in England
- Mile End New Town, London, England
- Historical name for Myland, Essex, England
- Landport in Portsmouth, England, which had an area called Mile End within it
- Bridgeton, Glasgow, which has a district originally known as Mile-End

== Other ==
- Mile End Delicatessen, a Jewish deli in Boerum Hill, Brooklyn, United States
- Mile-End School, Aberdeen
- "Mile End", song by Pulp on the Trainspotting soundtrack
