= Milford Township =

Milford Township may refer to:

== Illinois ==
- Milford Township, Iroquois County, Illinois

== Indiana ==
- Milford Township, LaGrange County, Indiana

== Iowa ==
- Milford Township, Crawford County, Iowa
- Milford Township, Dickinson County, Iowa
- Milford Township, Story County, Iowa

== Kansas ==
- Milford Township, Geary County, Kansas

== Michigan ==
- Milford Township, Michigan

== Minnesota ==
- Milford Township, Brown County, Minnesota

== Missouri ==
- Milford Township, Barton County, Missouri

== Ohio ==
- Milford Township, Butler County, Ohio
- Milford Township, Defiance County, Ohio
- Milford Township, Knox County, Ohio

== Pennsylvania ==
- Milford Township, Bucks County, Pennsylvania
- Milford Township, Juniata County, Pennsylvania
- Milford Township, Pike County, Pennsylvania
- Milford Township, Somerset County, Pennsylvania

== South Dakota ==
- Milford Township, Beadle County, South Dakota, in Beadle County, South Dakota
