= Milford Dam =

Milford Dam can refer to:

- Milford Dam (Kansas)
- Milford Dam (Maine)

== See also ==
- Milford (disambiguation)
