= List of United Kingdom locations: Milb-Milk =

The United Kingdom

This is part of the list of United Kingdom locations: a gazetteer of place names in the United Kingdom showing each place's locality and geographical coordinates.

== Milb-Milk ==
Location	Locality	Coordinates (links to map & photo sources)	OS grid reference
Milber	Devon	50.51°N 03.59°W	SX8770
Milborne Port	Somerset	50.96°N 02.47°W	ST6718
Milborne St Andrew	Dorset	50.77°N 02.28°W	SY8097
Milborne Wick	Somerset	50.97°N 02.48°W	ST6620
Milbourne	Northumberland	55.06°N 01.82°W	NZ1175
Milbourne	Wiltshire	51.58°N 02.08°W	ST9487
Milburn	Cumbria	54.65°N 02.54°W	NY6529
Milbury Heath	South Gloucestershire	51.60°N 02.49°W	ST6690
Milby	North Yorkshire	54.09°N 01.38°W	SE4067
Milch Hill	Essex	51.85°N 00.49°E	TL7220
Milcombe	Cornwall	50.36°N 04.49°W	SX2355
Milcombe	Oxfordshire	52.00°N 01.40°W	SP4134
Milden	Suffolk	52.07°N 00.84°E	TL9546
Mildenhall	Suffolk	52.34°N 00.50°E	TL7175
Mildenhall	Wiltshire	51.41°N 01.71°W	SU2069
Milebrook	Powys	52.34°N 03.01°W	SO3172
Milebush	Kent	51.17°N 00.50°E	TQ7545
Mile Cross	Norfolk	52.64°N 01.26°E	TG2110
Mile Elm	Wiltshire	51.42°N 02.01°W	ST9969
Mile End	Cambridgeshire	52.42°N 00.35°E	TL6083
Mile End	Cheshire	53.10°N 02.52°E	SJ6556
Mile End	Devon	50.53°N 03.65°W	SX8372
Mile End	Essex	51.90°N 00.89°E	TL9927
Mile End	Gloucestershire	51.79°N 02.61°W	SO5811
Mile End	Suffolk	52.13°N 00.65°E	TL8252
Mile End	Tower Hamlets	51.52°N 00.04°W	TQ3682
Mileham	Norfolk	52.73°N 00.82°E	TF9119
Mile Oak	Kent	51.16°N 00.40°E	TQ6843
Mile Oak	Brighton and Hove	50.84°N 00.22°W	TQ2507
Mile Oak	Shropshire	52.83°N 03.04°W	SJ3027
Mile Oak	Staffordshire	52.61°N 01.73°W	SK1802
Miles Cross	Dorset	50.73°N 02.79°W	SY4493
Miles Green	Surrey	51.31°N 00.63°W	SU9558
Miles Green	Staffordshire	53.03°N 02.29°W	SJ8049
Miles Hill	Leeds	53.81°N 01.56°W	SE2936
Milesmark	Fife	56.07°N 03.49°W	NT0788
Miles Platting	Manchester	53.48°N 02.21°W	SJ8699
Miles's Green	Berkshire	51.41°N 01.22°W	SU5469
Mile Town	Kent	51.43°N 00.74°E	TQ9174
Milfield	Northumberland	55.59°N 02.11°W	NT9333
Milford	Devon	50.97°N 04.52°W	SS2322
Milford	Surrey	51.16°N 00.65°W	SU9442
Milford	Wiltshire	51.06°N 01.78°W	SU1529
Milford	Powys	52.50°N 03.34°W	SO0990
Milford	Derbyshire	53.00°N 01.47°W	SK3545
Milford	Shropshire	52.78°N 02.87°W	SJ4121
Milford	Staffordshire	52.78°N 02.06°W	SJ9621
Milford Haven	Pembrokeshire	51.70°N 05.04°W	SM9005
Milford on Sea	Hampshire	50.71°N 01.60°W	SZ2891
Milkhouse Water	Wiltshire	51.34°N 01.75°W	SU1761
Milkieston	Scottish Borders	55.69°N 03.21°W	NT2445
Milkwall	Gloucestershire	51.77°N 02.61°W	SO5809
Milkwell	Wiltshire	51.00°N 02.12°W	ST9123
