= Eula (given name) =

Eula is a feminine given name. Notable people with the name include:

- Eula Beal, American opera singer
- Eula Bingham, American scientist
- Eula Biss, American writer
- Eula Caballero, Filipina actress
- Eula Hall, American activist
- Eula Love, American crime victim
- Eula Davis McEwan, American paleontologist
- Eula Valdez, Filipina actress
- Eula Lawrence (Chinese: 优菈), a fictional playable character in the game Genshin Impact

== See also ==
- Eula (disambiguation)
