= Edith Maryon Foundation =

- Founded: 1990
- Founders: John Ermel, Christoph Langscheid, Michael Riggenbach
- Type: Swiss Foundation (Stiftung)
- Purpose: Promotion and establishment of socially oriented housing and workplaces
- Location: Basel, Switzerland
- Region served: Switzerland and Germany
- Key people: Rembert Biemond (Chair of the Foundation Council); Christoph Langscheid (Managing Director); Klaudia Agbaba; Klaus Jensen; Ulrich Kriese
- Endowment: CHF 343 million (as of 2025)
- Employees: 19 (as of 2025)
- Website: maryon.ch

The Edith Maryon Foundation (German: Stiftung Edith Maryon zur Förderung sozialer Wohn- und Arbeitsstätten) is a nonprofit organization founded in Basel, Switzerland, in 1990. The foundation is dedicated to removing land and real-estate property from speculation and ensuring their long-term use for social, innovative, and sustainable purposes. It makes its properties available to third parties for socially oriented housing, cultural, or workplace projects. The foundation’s main areas of activity are in Switzerland and Germany.

== History ==
The foundation was established in 1990 by Christoph Langscheid, John Ermel, and Michael Riggenbach with an initial capital of 12,000 Swiss francs. It is regarded as a pioneer of mission and impact investing focused on real estate and land. In many of its housing projects, elements of the cohousing concept are applied.

The foundation is named after the English sculptor Edith Maryon, a close collaborator of Rudolf Steiner who initiated social housing for the coworkers of the Goetheanum. Over a generation, the foundation’s real-estate portfolio has grown to 166 projects, some of which are held through subsidiaries.

As of December 2024, the foundation’s total assets amounted to 343 million Swiss francs. Its growth has been largely financed through donations, legacies, and interest-free loans from numerous private individuals. Over the years, the foundation has also become an active grant-making body in the fields of art and culture.

== Projects in Switzerland (selected) ==
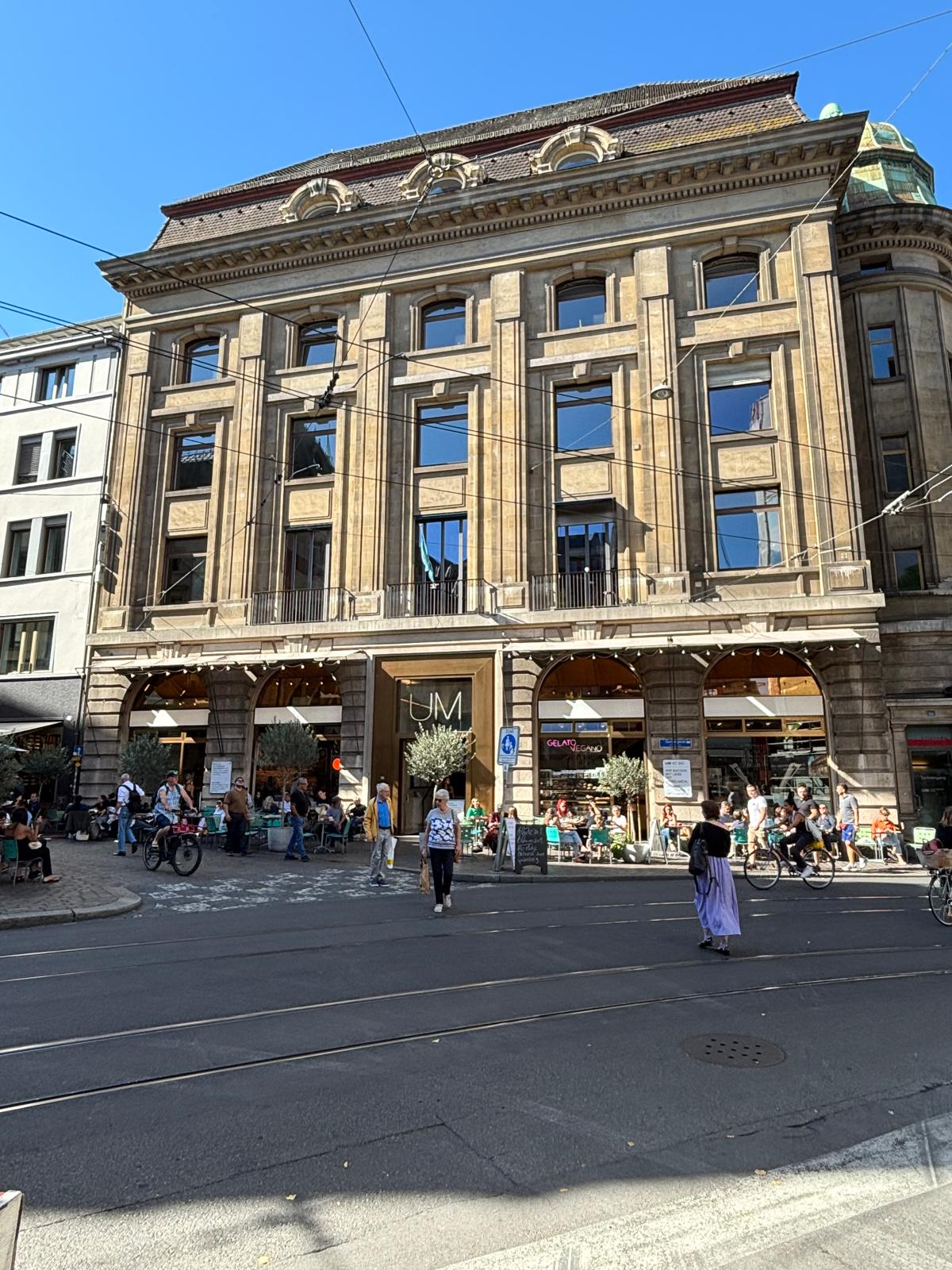
Unternehmen Mitte in Basel, 2025

- Unternehmen Mitte, Basel – headquarters of the foundation
- Hotel Krafft, Basel
- Markthalle Basel
- Kloster Schönthal (Switzerland)|Schönthal Monastery, Basel-Landschaft
- Rudolf Steiner School Basel
- Rudolf Steiner School Münchenstein (former Haas’sche Schriftgiesserei)
- Alte Feuerwehr Viktoria, Bern – a cooperative cultural center
- Neuestheater.ch, Dornach
- Bain da Chauenas farm, Scuol
- Sunnehügel – House of Hospitality, Schüpfheim

== Projects in Germany (selected) ==
- ExRotaprint, Berlin
- Delphi Filmpalast|Former silent-film cinema Delphi, Berlin
- One-World Center, Berlin (AM Sudhaus site) (in German)
- Schokoladen cultural space, Berlin-Mitte
- Halle Tanzbühne Berlin, home of the cie. toula limnaios dance company
- Landwerk Neuendorf, Brandenburg
- KlausHaus, Leipzig – a collective housing project
- Kindl site, Berlin-Neukölln – Project VOLLGUT
- Landgut Pretschen, Märkische Heide (organic farm in the Spreewald region)
- Tuntenhaus, Berlin

== Housing assistance ==
Under the program title Housing Assistance (German: Wohnhilfen), the foundation has, since 2003, provided rental-deposit guarantees based on a solidarity fund. In total, more than 13,000 households in north-western Switzerland have been able to obtain a rental contract through this mechanism, with around 1,000 new guarantees issued each year.

In addition, the foundation operates a hardship fund (Härtefällefonds) in cooperation with the Christoph Merian Foundation and, together with the Canton of Basel-Stadt, manages on behalf of the Basel Housing Foundation a cooperative-share fund (Genossenschaftanteilfonds) designed to facilitate access to cooperative housing.

== Organization ==
The highest governing body of the foundation is the Foundation Council (Stiftungsrat), consisting of five members. An advisory board of nineteen people supports the council. Day-to-day operations are carried out by the foundation’s office in Basel, which employs 19 staff members (as of 2025).

== See also ==
- Stiftung trias
- Mietshäuser Syndikat
- Gemeingut Boden (in German)

== Literature and media ==
- Land in Sicht (Land in Sight). Documentary film, 48 min., Switzerland 2024. Written and directed by Marcel Scheible, produced by Sel et Poivre GmbH – commissioned in connection with projects of the Edith Maryon Foundation. Official website
- Daniela Patti and Levente Polyak (eds.): Funding the Cooperative City: Community Finance and the Economy of Civic Spaces. Cooperative City Books, Vienna 2017. ISBN 978-3-9504409-04-0. Online (PDF) (CC BY-NC-ND 4.0)
- Berliner Liegenschaftsanzeiger (Newspaper of the Initiative Stadt-Neudenken), No. 1, 5 May 2012 (in German).
- Veronica Frenzel: Das ist unser Haus (“This is Our House”). In: Der Tagesspiegel, No. 21330, 12 May 2013, pp. 24–25 (in German).
- id22: Institut für kreative Nachhaltigkeit Berlin (eds.): CoHousing Cultures: Handbook for Self-Organized, Collective and Sustainable Living. Jovis, Berlin 2012. ISBN 978-3-86859-148-4.
- Ulrich Kriese: The Edith Maryon Foundation as a Project Partner for Community Housing Projects. In: Erwägungen (Journal of the Theological Movement for Solidarity and Liberation – TheBe), vol. 29, no. 2 ( July 2011 ), pp. 17–19 (in German).
- David Matthee and Ulrich Kriese: Strategies for the De-commodification of Land – The Transformative Potential of Land Foundations. In: Sozialimpulse. Beiträge zur Transformation in Wirtschaft, Politik, Kultur und Gesellschaft, no. 2/2025 (August), pp. 4–12 (in German).
- Ulrich Kriese: Land Law and Land Injustice: From Land as a Commons to Private Ownership – and Encouraging Forces Today. In: Sozialimpulse. Beiträge zur Transformation in Wirtschaft, Politik, Kultur und Gesellschaft, no. 2/2025 (August), pp. 20–27 (in German).
