= Milford (ship) =

Several vessels have been named Milford.

- Milford (1784 ship), of 301 tons (bm), was built at Bristol. Between 1800 and 1803 she made three voyages as a West Indiaman. In May 1803 she was homeward bound from Honduras when she was lost at Truxillo. Her crew and cargo were saved.
- Milford (1786 ship) was built at Bombay. She was a country ship that traded around India and between India and China, though she also traded with England. She made one voyage for the British East India Company (EIC). She was lost at Calcutta in August 1829.
- Milford, a snow of 114 or 120 tons (bm), was launched at Milford in 1808. She apparently made one voyage in 1826 to the Bay of Islands as a whaler. She was last listed in 1844 sailing as a coaster between Llanelli and Ireland.
- PS Milford was a passenger paddle-steamer built for the Great Western Railway. She was scrapped in 1901.

== See also ==
- HMS Milford – one of nine ships of the British Royal Navy
- USNS Milford
