= NMHS =

NMHS may refer to:

== Schools ==
- Norwood Morialta High School, former name of Norwood International High School, Adelaide, Australia
- Naples Middle/High School, Gricignano di Aversa, Italy
- North Medford High School, Oregon, United States
- North Mecklenburg High School, North Carolina, United States
- North Mesquite High School, Texas, United States
- Newark Memorial High School, California, United States
- New Milford High School (disambiguation), several schools in United States

== Other uses ==
- National Maritime Historical Society, an American non-profit organization
- National meteorological and hydrological service
