= HMS Milford =

Nine ships of the Royal Navy have borne the name HMS Milford:

- HMS Milford (1660) was a 22-gun ship launched in 1654 as Fagons. She was renamed HMS Milford in 1660 and was burnt by accident in 1673.
- HMS Milford (1690) was a 32-gun fifth rate launched in 1690 and captured by the French in 1693.
- HMS Milford (1695) was a 32-gun fifth rate launched in 1695 and captured by two French privateers in 1697.
- HMS Milford was a 32-gun fifth rate launched in 1694 as HMS Scarborough. She was captured by the French later in 1694, and renamed Duc de Chaulnes. She was recaptured in 1696 and taken into service as HMS Milford. She was rebuilt in 1705 and wrecked in 1720.
- HMS Milford was a 50-gun fourth rate launched in 1712 as HMS Advice. She was renamed HMS Milford in 1744 and sold in 1749.
- HMS Milford (1759) was a 28-gun sixth rate launched in 1759 and sold in 1785.
- HMS Milford (1809) was a 78-gun third rate launched in 1809, used for harbour service from 1825 and broken up in 1846.
- HMS Milford (1816) was a tank vessel in service between 1816 and 1852.
- HMS Milford (L51) was a Shoreham-class sloop launched in 1932 and sold in 1949.

== See also ==
- RMAS Milford (A91) was a Royal Maritime Auxiliary Service tender launched in 1982. She was purchased in for use as a ferry and renamed MV Amazon Hope in 2001.
