= Eula =

Eula may refer to:

== Geography ==
=== Germany ===
- Eula, Borna, a village in the borough of Borna, Leipzig district, Saxony
- Eula, Nossen, a village in the borough of Nossen, Meißen district, Saxony
- Eula (river), a right tributary of the Wyhra in Saxony
- Eula, Berga, a village in the borough of Berga/Elster, Greiz district, Thuringia

=== Elsewhere ===
- Eula, Texas, an unincorporated community in the United States
- Jílovský creek, known as Eula in German, a tributary of the Elbe in Jílové, Czech Republic

== People ==
- Eula (given name), a feminine given name
- Joe Eula (1925–2004), American fashion illustrator
- Lorenzo Eula (1824–1893), Italian politician who briefly served as Minister of Justice

== Other uses ==
- End-user license agreement (EULA), a type of software license agreement
- Eula, a character in 2020 video game Genshin Impact
