= New Milford High School =

New Milford High School may refer to:

- New Milford High School (New Jersey), New Milford, New Jersey
- New Milford High School (Connecticut), New Milford, Connecticut

== See also ==
- Milford High School (disambiguation)
