= Young Farmers' Clubs of Ulster =

Youth clubs in Northern Ireland

- Founded: 1929
- Founder: W.S. Armour
- Type: Agricultural youth charity
- Registration no.: XN 47288
- Purpose: Agriculture, farming, youth, non-political, non-sectarian, cooperation and peace
- Location: 475 Antrim Road, Belfast, BT15 3BD, UK
- Coordinates: 54°37′46″N 5°56′20″W
- Region served: Northern Ireland
- Method: Youth events, farming life and education
- Members: c. 3,600
- Key people: Chief Executive Derek Lough; President Richard Beattie; Deputy President Kristina Fleming
- Employees: 11
- Website: www.yfcu.org

The Young Farmers' Clubs of Ulster (YFCU) was founded in 1929 by W.S. Armour in Limavady, Northern Ireland. Since its creation, YFCU has grown into an association of 52 local self-governing and youth-led clubs, with a headquarters in Belfast.

The association is managed by a peer-elected Board of Directors who serve as the executive committee.

YFCU is for young people aged 12 to 30 years. The association is strictly non-political and non-sectarian and is open to anyone, the only requirement being an interest in rural life.

History

William Rankin, BAgr, described in a series of articles he contributed to The Ulster Young Farmer about the early days of the movement when he wrote:

"It required courage, vision, inspiration and absolute belief in one's own convictions to attempt anything like creating an organisation for young farmers in those days, and Northern Ireland was fortunate that such a man was found in the person of W.S. Armour."

=== W.S. Armour ===
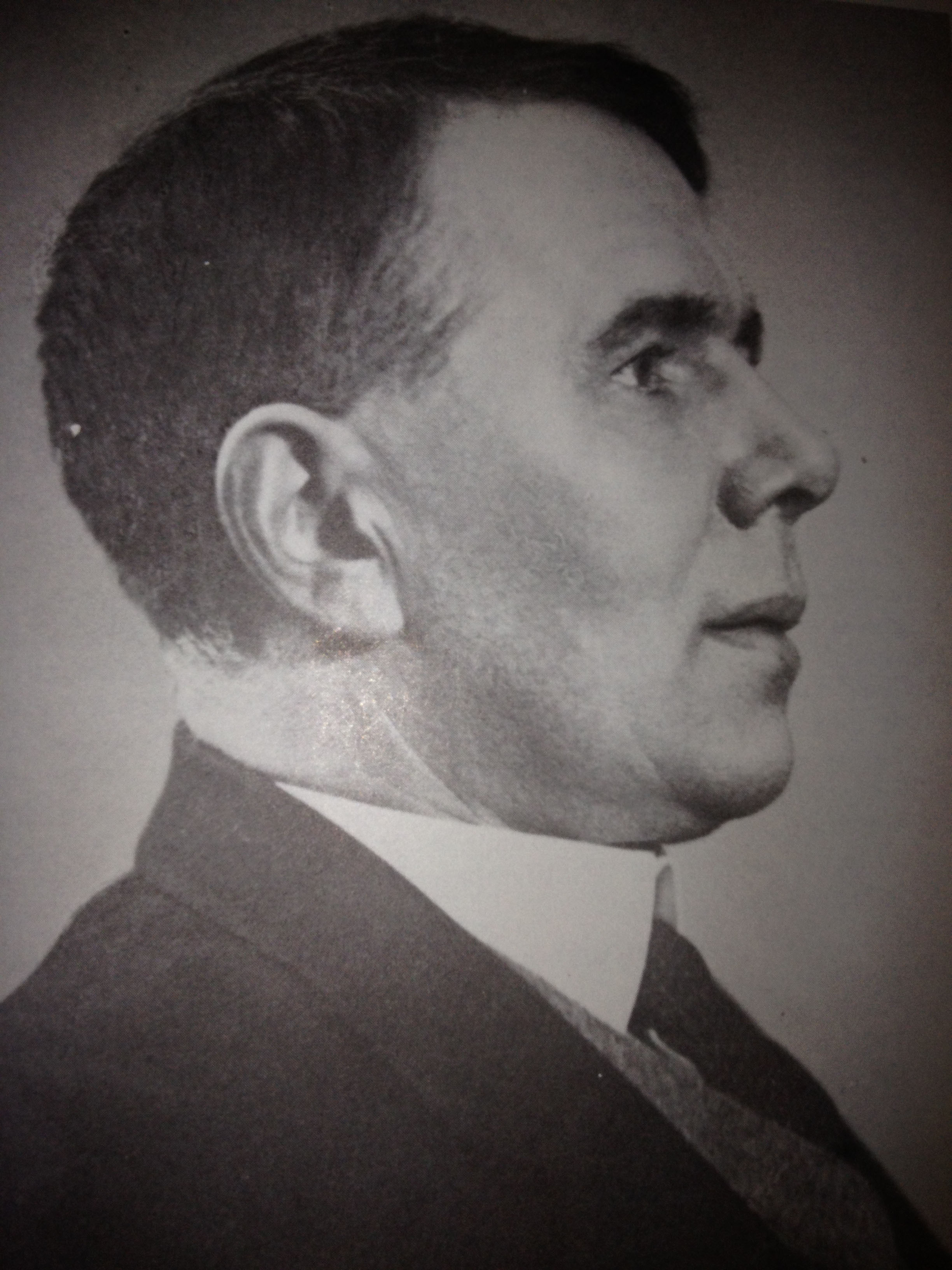
William S. Armour, founder of Young Farmers' Clubs of Ulster

William Staveley Armour was a North Antrim man, born in the town of Ballymoney in 1883, the eldest son of the illustrious Rev. J.B. Armour, a man known throughout Ulster for his leadership of the local farmers in the Tenant Right Campaign of the 1870s. Through the contacts which his father had with the farming world, he came to appreciate and understand farmers' difficulties, and he had also first hand experience of a farm, for as a boy he spent much of his free time on his grandfather's farm at Lisboy, Kilraughts.

In 1903 he went up to Oxford on a scholarship to Jesus College. There he had a distinguished academic career and gained renown as a debater, being elected President of the Union in 1907, a much coveted position which is supposed to open the way to a Westminster seat and early elevation to cabinet rank. That was not to be W.S. Armour's path. He gained his law degree, went on to be a member of the Inner Temple and became a Barrister-at-law, but, while still pursuing his law studies, he chose for the moment to enter the sphere of education and sailed for India in 1910.

At first he was a headmaster and later an inspector of schools, but when the First World War began in 1914 he was given special responsibility for war publicity at Allahabad, eventually becoming editor of the United Provinces War Journal. He also published a short account of the war, which sold half a million copies in India, and wrote a number of school textbooks. For his services he was honoured by H.M. King George V with the MBE.

After his return to London in 1922, Armour received word that his father was very ill. What happened next he recorded in his book, Facing The Irish Question:

"I went home for six weeks, and on the way to London via Belfast the idea came to me that in the circumstances I should stay there. Without any premeditation, I went straight to the proprietor of The Northern Whig and asked whether there was any position on his paper."

He obtained the position of reporter, was promoted to 'Writer of Special Articles' after six weeks, and assumed the role of editor in 1928. The Northern Whig was then one of the three daily newspapers published in Belfast. Even as editor, he continued to contribute special articles under the initials 'WA', writing on subjects ranging from political controversy and educational matters to accounts of people and places from his world travels, to investigation of social problems in Northern Ireland and proposals for their reform.

It was while pursuing this latter theme that he wrote the article which began the Young Farmers' Movement in Ulster.

Two things must strike everyone who moves about rural Ulster. The first is the steady drain of youth from the countryside to the cities and abroad. One reason is that they have very few interests and are frankly bored with life. The second picture is of young people night after night loafing round corners, winter and summer, with nothing whatsoever to do. They are like the people "standing idle in the market place ... because no man hath hired us". In this paper there have been constant references to the happier state a century ago; ... also from time to time there have been accounts of young farmers' clubs and similar movements, but nothing has happened and things remain just as before. We must try again and see whether something cannot be done this time'.

He had researched his article thoroughly and had been in contact with the YFC Movement in England. It had already attracted membership of over two thousand, with ninety-four clubs in existence in various parts of the country.

==== Structuring Young Farmers' Clubs ====
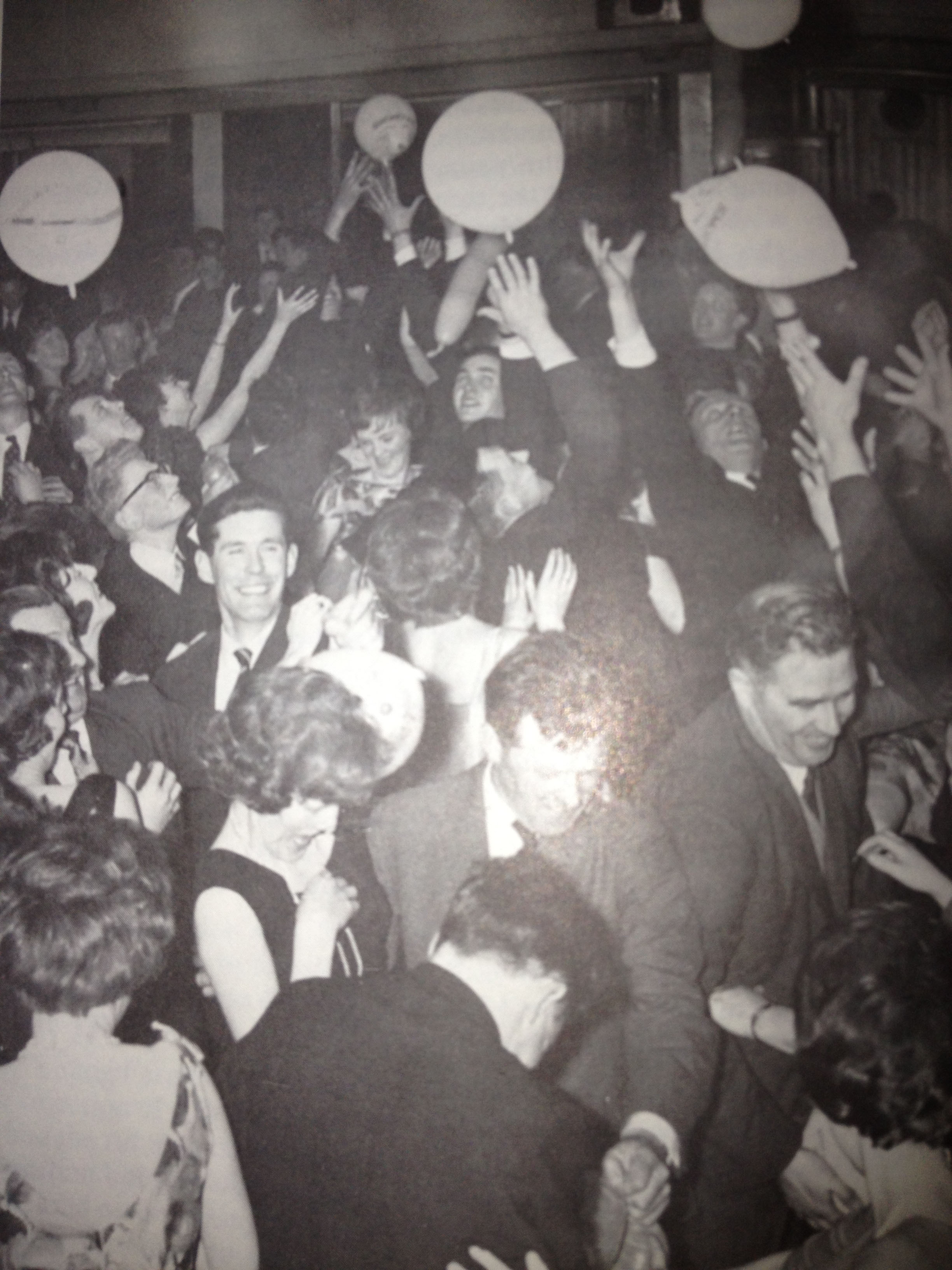
YFC social in 1950sl

W.S. Armour said it was essential to hold a public meeting to test local opinion and especially to invite parents and teachers to attend. If opinion was favourable then the choice of an enthusiastic and responsible person to act as Club Leader was vital. He felt clubs should be open to all young people under the age of twenty and he favoured the idea, used in England, that each member should be encouraged to either own livestock or to interest him or herself in a garden or allotment. Members should meet regularly to compare notes, discuss costs and hear talks from experts. He noted that in England these meetings had gradually developed into a social centre for the young people of the village and hoped the same would be true of Ulster. He said one of the most promising features of the YFC movement was that it provided a practical and popular starting point from which other activities for the benefit of the young people could be developed.

== Membership ==
The organisation currently has c.3500 members spread across the 51 member clubs, the largest of which is Collone, Co Armagh.

Current member clubs:

County Antrim	County Armagh	County Down	County Fermanagh	County Londonderry	County Tyrone
Ahoghill	Bleary	Annaclone & Magerally	Derrygonnelly	City of Derry	Cappagh
Crumlin	Collone	Artana	Coleraine	Castlecaulfield	
Finvoy	Mountnorris	Ballymiscaw	Kesh	Curragh	Clanabogan
Glarryford	Newtownhamilton	Ballywalter	Lisbellaw	Dungiven	Cookstown
Gleno Valley		Donaghadee	Lisnaskea	Garvagh	Derg Valley
Holestone		Hillhall		Kilrea	Newtownstewart
Kells & Connor		Hillsborough		Moneymore	Seskinore
Kilraughts		Killinchy			Strabane
Lisnamurrican		Moneyrea			Trillick
Lylehill		Newtownards			
Milebush		Rathfriland			
Moycraig		Spa			
Randalstown					
Rathmore					
Straid					
The Glens					

YFCU promotes four key areas to its membership:

- Achievement: Learn new skills and realise one's full potential.
- Friendship: YFCU encourages its members to take advantage of the opportunities to meet and make new friends. These can be other members of one's club, members from other clubs and members from their sister organisations throughout the world.
- Fun: Offers a wide range of social events and travelling for members
- Participation: YFCU aims to work together as a team to do what one wants to do, and achieve the goals set by the local clubs.

== Activities and events ==
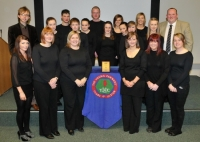
Glarryford YFC Choir 2010

A wide range of activities and events, relevant to the needs and interests of rural young people is organised every year. Throughout the year staff and members are keyto delivering and participating in the annual programme of centrally organised competitions and activities. There has continued to be a year on year increase in competitor numbers. The YFCU has been represented by a number of members at events and conferences held by the Association's sister organisations in Scotland, Wales, England and the Republic of Ireland.

YFCU currently operates 33 competitions and events that members are encouraged to enter. By entering events YFCU members earn proficiencies points. The better the member does in the competition, the higher the proficiency points awarded.

Event	Event
Advanced Sheep Sheering	Art Competition
Arts Festival	not happening
Build It	Choir Festival
Craftwork	Dairy Cattle Stock Judging and Assessment
Demonstration	Drama - One Act Festival
Drama - Full Length	Fencing Competition
Floral Art	Girls Football
Group Debating	Home Management
John Bradley Competition	Junior Member of the Year
Junior Ulster Young Farmer	Machinery Handling
Member of the Year	NI Quiz
Photographic Competition	Public Speaking
Sheep Stock Judging and Assessment	Silage Assessment
Silage Making	Soil Assessment
Something from Scrap	Swimming Gala
Tag Rugby Tournament	Tug of War
Ulster Young Farmer	

== Rural Dispatch magazine ==
Originally established as The Ulster Young Farmer in 1946, the first editor was A. S. George Loxton. In his first edition editorial he hoped the new magazine would become "the most interesting and instructive" of the many then in circulation in the Province.

Loxton retired in March 1948 and was succeeded by Arthur McAlister, who used his considerable literary ability to good effect as editor for the next sixteen years. He introduced many new features and widened the scope of the magazine to include general, as well as agricultural interest. In May 1964 the magazine changed format to keep pace with modern developments in printing. Michael Fieldhouse, the first Public Relations Officer of the YFCU, became editor in July 1964, and in September 1965 Dulcie Proctor succeeded him. She remained editor until the publication ceased in 1971.

In 2004 the magazine was revived under the new moniker Rural Dispatch.

Rural Dispatch is the official magazine of the Young Farmers' Clubs of Ulster. It is edited in-house at the Belfast Headquarters. The magazine, which is published three times a year, has a circulation of 2,500. Its main aim is to showcase the events and activities that YFCU organises, and to inform the membership of news from other clubs and the Northern Ireland agricultural industry as a whole. It is published in association with United Dairy Farmers.

== Sister organisations ==
Young Farmers' Clubs of Ulster has many sister organisations not only throughout the UK and Ireland, but throughout the world.

- Macra na Feirme (Ireland)
- Ulster Farmers Union (Ulster)
- National Federation of Young Farmers (England)
- Scottish Association of Young Farmers Club (Scotland)
- New Zealand Young Farmers
