= Radical Routes =

UK-based network of co-operatives

- Formation: Incorporated 1 April 1992
- Type: Secondary co-operative
- Registration no.: 27587R
- Legal status: Registered Society
- Purpose: Social change
- Region served: United Kingdom
- Services: Co-operative development, finance, training, gatherings
- Members: 36 housing co-ops and worker co-ops
- Main organ: Quarterly Gathering of Members
- Website: radicalroutes.org.uk

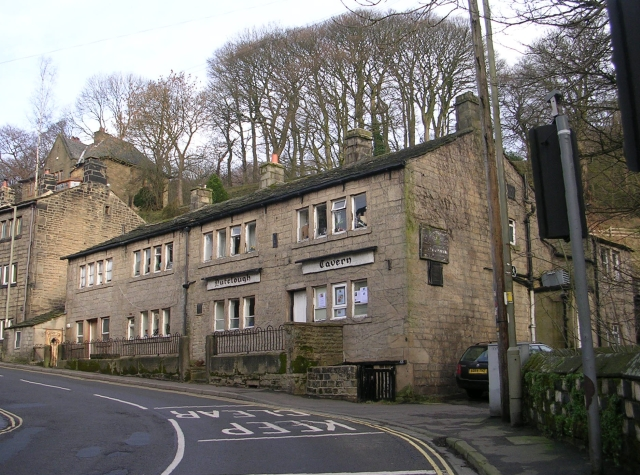
Radical Routes member Nutclough Housing Co-operative in Hebden Bridge, West Yorkshire.

Radical Routes is a UK-based network of housing co-ops. The organisation supports new and established co-ops through loan finance, training workshops, practical support, and national gatherings.

== History ==
Radical Routes emerged in 1986 from a network of people in London and Hull who wanted to develop workers' co-operatives. The network agreed its common aims and adopted the name Radical Routes in 1988, and became incorporated as Radical Routes Limited in 1992. In 1998 Rootstock Limited was incorporated as an investment scheme supporting Radical Routes co-operatives. The original house in Hockley was set up as the 'New Education Housing Co-op'.

According to Rootstock, between 1991 and 2012 Radical Routes made over sixty loans to member co-ops – totaling over £1m – with no co-operatives defaulting on loan payments. These loans have typically been used by member housing co-ops, in addition to finance from traditional lenders, to buy property.

== Work ==
Radical Routes provides small loans (up to about £50,000) to member co-operatives. Decisions on making loans are made collectively by other member co-operatives, this has been described as "peer-group loan appraisal".

Radical Routes publishes booklets on subjects such as How to set up a Housing Co-operative and How to set up a Worker Co-operative.

With Cooperatives UK they launched proposals for an independent co-operative regulator after the government announced that it would be abolishing the FSA. Previously the FSA had regulated co-operatives, which were registered as industrial and provident societies.

Radical Routes is developing a ‘co-op cluster’ model for co-op housing with groups of housing co-ops combining their assets to buy new properties outright, eliminating mortgage interest.

== Membership ==
Member co-operatives are expected to commit to a share of Radical Routes' workload as volunteers, and work toward radical social change.

At January 2024 the organisation has 30 members: 26 housing co-ops and 4 worker co-ops.

== Limitations ==
A 2014 round table report by Radical Routes and Friends Provident Foundation identified carpet bagging, among other things, as a systemic weakness within the existing housing co-op framework. 'Carpet bagging' refers to established co-ops significantly reducing their rents or, rarely, selling their property for private gain. The report explores ways in which the systematic weaknesses might be addressed, mentioning the Mietshäuser Syndikat model as having provably solved the carpet bagging issue.

== See also ==
- Mietshäuser Syndikat
- Triodos Bank
