= Bryce, Illinois =

- Unincorporated community
- Iroquois County's location in Illinois

- Location within Iroquois County, Illinois
- Coordinates: 40°38′04″N 87°45′24″W
- Country: United States
- State: Illinois
- County: Iroquois County
- Township: Milford Township
- Elevation: 682 ft (208 m)
- Time zone: UTC-6 (CST)
  - Summer (DST): UTC-5 (CDT)
- ZIP code: 60916, 60953
- GNIS feature ID: 0422509

Bryce is an unincorporated community in Milford Township, Iroquois County, Illinois, United States.
