= Millford =

Millford may refer to:

- Millford Plantation, North Carolina, United States
- Kittiewan, a plantation house in Virginia, United States, originally known as Millford
- Milford, New Jersey, United States, a borough in Hunterdon County, once known as Millford
- Milford, Derbyshire, England, a village, once referred to as Millford
- Milford, County Armagh, Northern Ireland, a village, also known as Millford
- Milford, County Donegal, Ireland, a small town, also known as Millford

== See also ==
- Milford (disambiguation)
