= Milford (name) =

Milford is a surname and a masculine given name. Notable people with the name include:

== Surname ==
- Milford (surname)

== Given name ==
- Milford Beagle Jr., American army officer
- Milford Burriss (1937–2016), American businessman and politician
- Milford Graves (1941–2021), American musician
- Milford Hodge (born 1961), American football player
- Milford W. Howard (1862–1937), American politician
- Milford C. Kintz (1903–1998), American politician
- Milford H. Wolpoff (born 1942), American paleoanthropologist
- Milford Zornes (1908–2008), American watercolor artist

== Fictional characters ==
- Milford Meanswell, a character in the TV series LazyTown
- Milford Cubicle, a character in the animation series Salad Fingers
