= Milford, Illinois =

- Village (United States)
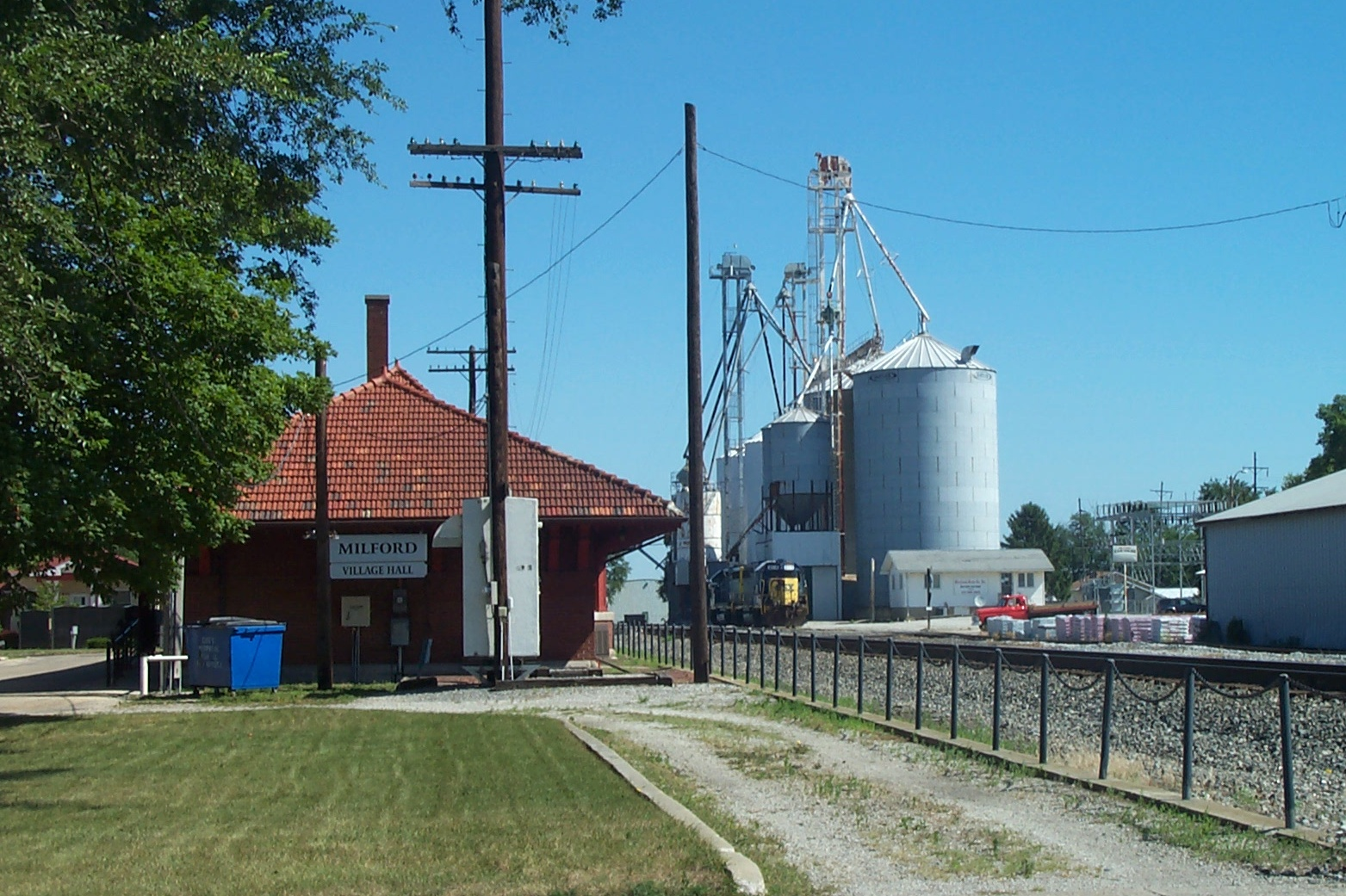
- Milford Village Hall and grain elevator

- Map of Milford

- Location in Iroquois County
- Coordinates: 40°37′40″N 87°41′47″W
- Country: United States
- State: Illinois
- County: Iroquois
- Township: Milford

Area
  - Total: 0.67 sq mi (1.74 km^{2})
  - Land: 0.67 sq mi (1.74 km^{2})
  - Water: 0 sq mi (0.00 km^{2})
- Elevation: 666 ft (203 m)

Population (2020)
  - Total: 1,158
  - Density: 1,725.6/sq mi (666.24/km^{2})
- Time zone: UTC-6 (CST)
  - Summer (DST): UTC-5 (CDT)
- ZIP code: 60953
- Area code: 815
- FIPS code: 17-49048
- GNIS feature ID: 2399343
- Website: https://www.villageofmilfordil.com/

Milford is a village in Milford Township, Iroquois County, Illinois, United States. The population was 1,158 at the 2020 census. The village's name comes from its location, where the Old Hubbard Trail forded Sugar Creek and where a gristmill stood in 1836 ("the mill at the ford").

== Geography ==
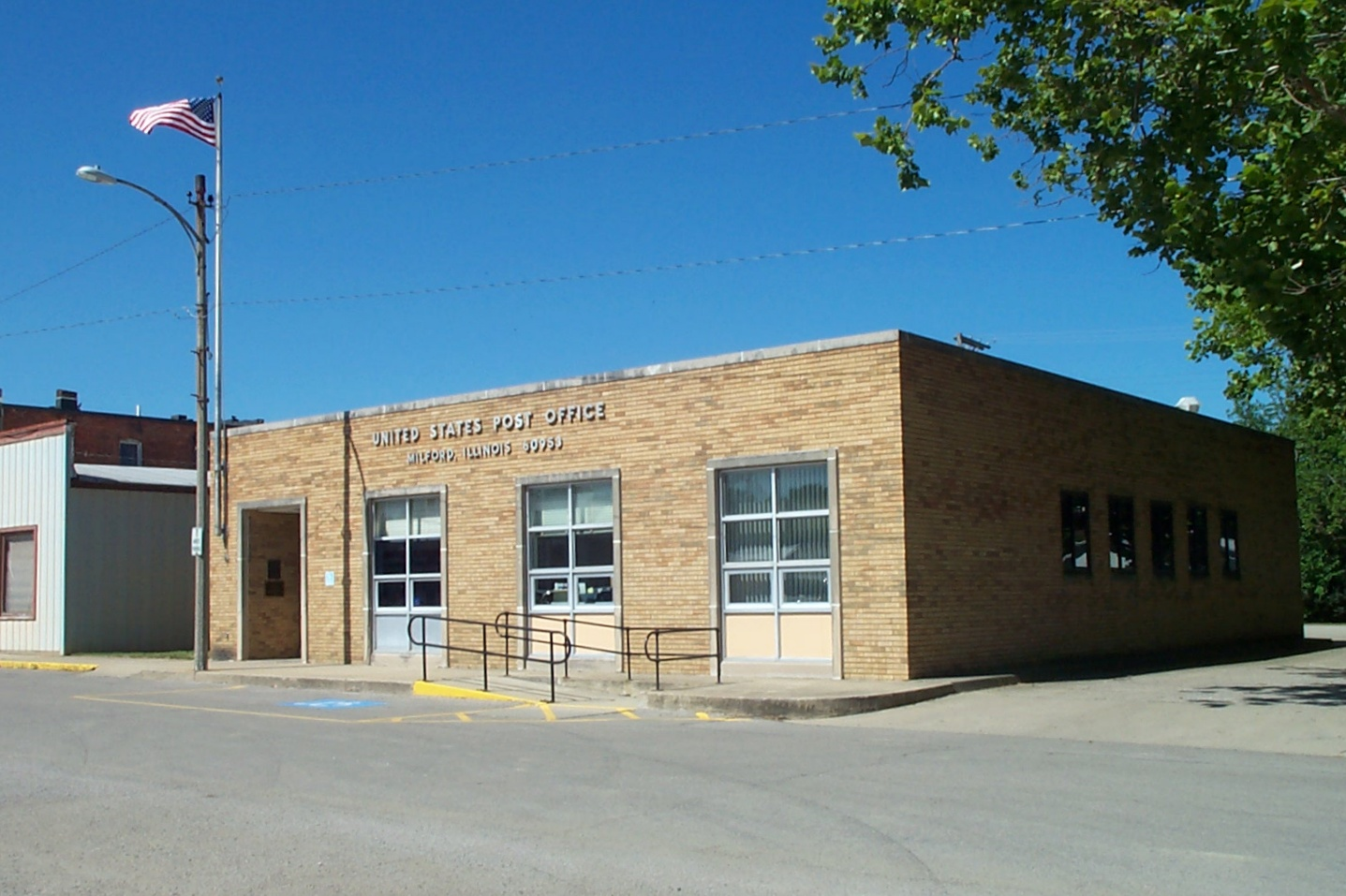
The post office in Milford

Milford is located in southeastern Iroquois County along Illinois Route 1, which leads north 12 miles (19 km) to Watseka, the county seat, and south the same distance to Hoopeston in Vermilion County. The Indiana border is 9 miles (14 km) east of Milford via county roads.

According to the 2021 census gazetteer files, Milford has a total area of 0.67 square miles (1.74 km^{2}), all land. Sugar Creek flows westward along the southern edge of the village, before turning north to flow to the Iroquois River near Watseka. It is part of the Kankakee River watershed.

== Demographics ==
Historical population
Census	Pop.	Note	%±
1870	230		—
1880	612		166.1%
1890	957		56.4%
1900	1,077		12.5%
1910	1,316		22.2%
1920	1,466		11.4%
1930	1,442		−1.6%
1940	1,628		12.9%
1950	1,648		1.2%
1960	1,699		3.1%
1970	1,656		−2.5%
1980	1,716		3.6%
1990	1,512		−11.9%
2000	1,369		−9.5%
2010	1,306		−4.6%
2020	1,158		−11.3%
U.S. Decennial Census

=== 2020 census ===
As of the 2020 census, Milford had a population of 1,158. The population density was 1,725.78 inhabitants per square mile (666.33/km^{2}), and housing density was 928.46 per square mile (358.48/km^{2}).

The median age was 42.1 years. 22.4% of residents were under the age of 18 and 21.2% of residents were 65 years of age or older. For every 100 females there were 90.1 males, and for every 100 females age 18 and over there were 85.0 males age 18 and over.

0.0% of residents lived in urban areas, while 100.0% lived in rural areas.

There were 524 households in Milford, of which 26.1% had children under the age of 18 living in them. Of all households, 37.0% were married-couple households, 21.2% were households with a male householder and no spouse or partner present, and 33.4% were households with a female householder and no spouse or partner present. About 36.3% of all households were made up of individuals and 18.0% had someone living alone who was 65 years of age or older.

There were 623 housing units, of which 15.9% were vacant. The homeowner vacancy rate was 1.3% and the rental vacancy rate was 14.6%.

Racial composition as of the 2020 census
Race	Number	Percent
White	1,061	91.6%
Black or African American	3	0.3%
American Indian and Alaska Native	0	0.0%
Asian	5	0.4%
Native Hawaiian and Other Pacific Islander	0	0.0%
Some other race	28	2.4%
Two or more races	61	5.3%
Hispanic or Latino (of any race)	59	5.1%

=== Income and poverty ===
The median income for a household in the village was $47,830, and the median income for a family was $55,054. Males had a median income of $33,750 versus $27,011 for females. The per capita income for the village was $23,502. About 5.9% of families and 13.2% of the population were below the poverty line, including 9.4% of those under age 18 and 5.9% of those age 65 or over.

== Education ==
=== High school athletics ===
Milford High School, which also brings in students from nearby communities of Stockland, Wellington and Sheldon, fields varsity level teams in; golf, baseball, softball, football, volleyball, cheer leading, and basketball. Teams play under the nickname "Bearcats" (boys) and "Lady Cats" (girls).

Football cooperative agreements: In the spring of 2009 it was announced that Cissna Park and Milford would form a high school football cooperative to become more competitive. Previously, the football program had co-oped with Sheldon (from 1993 through Sheldon's becoming part of the Milford school district) and Donovan (in 1997 and 1998).

Gymnasium: The school was also one of few nationally to feature a carpeted gym floor used for varsity level basketball and volleyball. The carpet was removed in the summer of 1997 and replaced by a plastic surface manufactured by Sport Court.

Night Football: The Bearcat football team took part in the first night football game in America. The contest took place on September 21, 1928, in Westville IL. Westville won the game 26–6. This is recognized by the Illinois High School Association as the first "modern" football game played under lights.

== Notable people ==
- Joseph R. Callahan, Illinois state representative; born on a farm near Milford
- Eula Davis McEwan, geologist, taught at the University of Nebraska
- Claude Rothgeb, outfielder and coach; born in Milford
- Jessie Sumner, Iroquois county judge and member of the U.S. House of Representatives

== Gallery ==
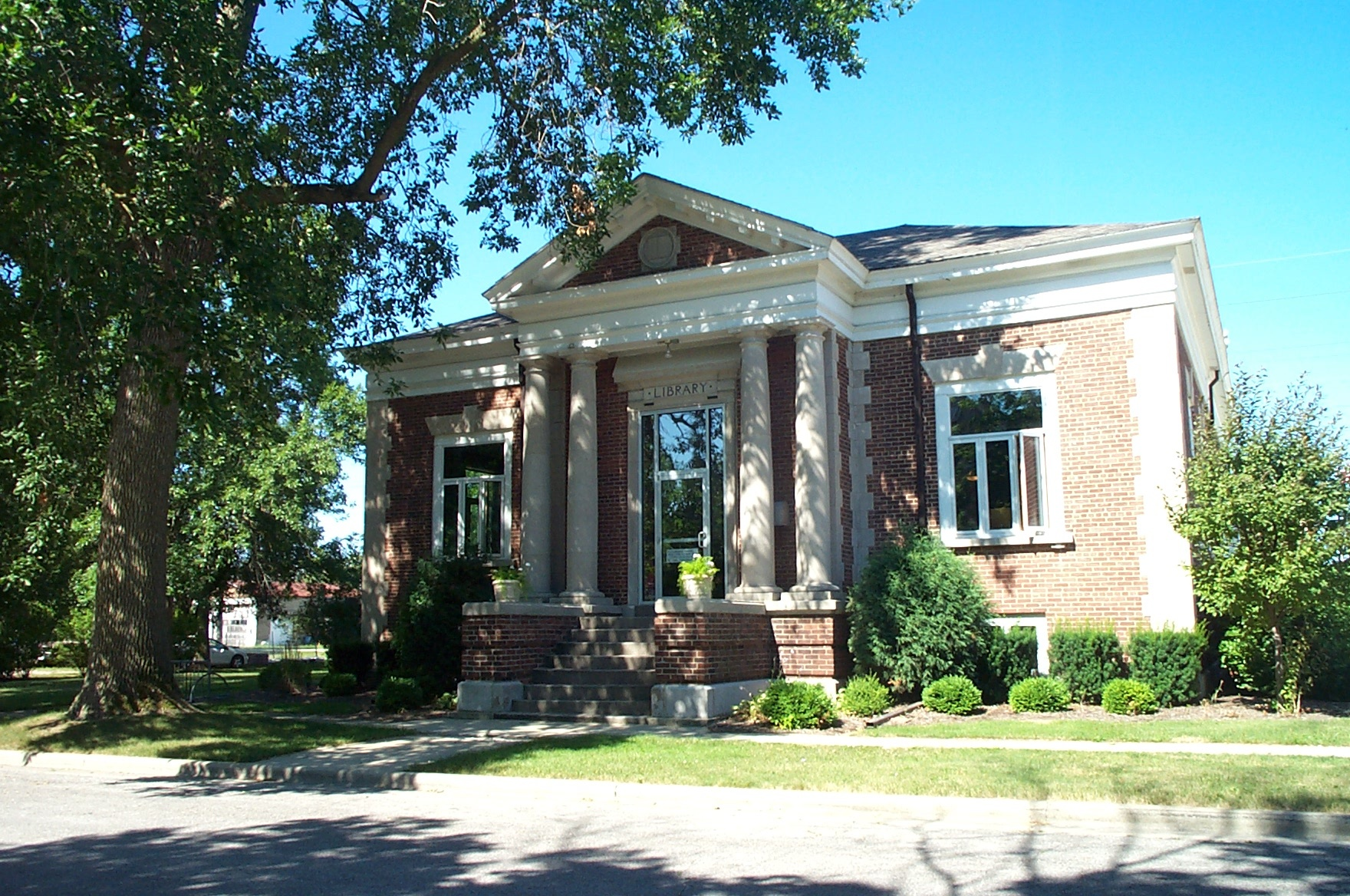
Milford Carnegie library

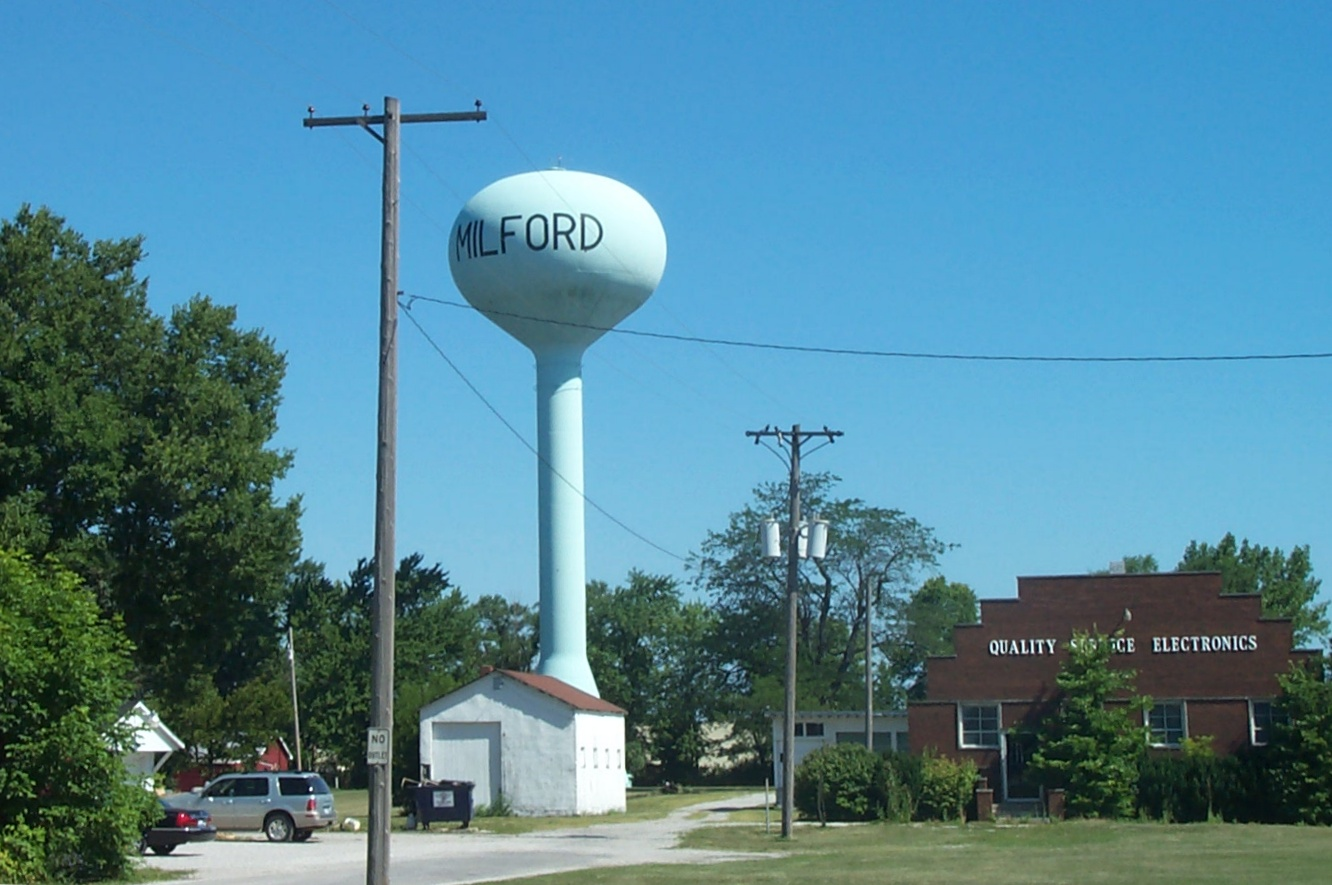
Milford's water tower
