= Montpelier High School =

Montpelier High School may refer to:

- Montpelier High School, Bristol
- Montpelier High School (Ohio)
- Montpelier High School (Vermont)
