= HMS Winchelsea (1694) =

Fifth-rate vessel built at Redbridge

History

England
- Name: HMS Winchelsea
- Ordered: 17 February 1693
- Builder: Mrs. Anne Wyatt, Redbridge (Southampton)
- Launched: 13 August 1694
- Commissioned: possibly 1694
- Captured: 6 June 1706
- Fate: Taken by five French privateers while on Fisheries Protection in English Channel

General characteristics as built
- Class & type: 30-gun fifth rate
- Tons burthen: 36453/94 tons (bm)
- Length: 103 ft 5 in (31.52 m) gundeck; 85 ft 4.5 in (26.02 m) keel for tonnage
- Beam: 28 ft 4 in (8.64 m)
- Depth of hold: 10 ft 7.5 in (3.24 m)
- Propulsion: Sails
- Sail plan: Full-rigged ship
- Armament: 1703 Establishment 32/28 guns; 4/4 × demi-culverins (LD); 22/20 × 6-pdr guns (UD); 6/4 × 4-pdr guns(QD)

HMS Winchelsea was a 32-gun fifth rate vessel built under contract at Redbridge (Southampton) in 1693/94. After commissioning she was employed for trade protection in the North Sea, guard ship at Plymouth, briefly with Shovell's Fleet in the Channel and a brief visit to the West Indies. While on fisheries protection in the Channel she was taken by the French off Hastings in June 1706.

She was the first vessel to bear the name Winchelsea or Winchelsey in the English and Royal Navy.

== Construction and specifications ==
She was ordered on 10 April 1693 to be built under contract by Mrs. Ann Wyatt of Redbridge (Southampton). She was launched on 13 August 1694. Her dimensions were a gundeck of 103 feet 5 inches (31.52 metres) with a keel of 85 feet 4.5 inches (26.02 metres) for tonnage calculation with a breadth of 28 feet 4 inches (8.64 metres) and a depth of hold of 10 feet 7.5 inches (3.24 metres). Her builder’s measure tonnage was calculated as 36453/94 tons (burthen).

The gun armament initially was four demi-culverins (Note: A demi-culverin was a gun of 3,400 pounds with a four-inch bore firing a 9.5-pound shot with an eight-pound powder charge) mounted on wooden trucks on the lower deck (LD) with two pair of guns per side. The upper deck (UD) battery would consist of between twenty and twenty-two sakers (Note: A sacar or saker was a gun of 1,400 pounds with a 3.5-inch bore firing a 5.5-pound shot with a 5.5-pound powder charge.) guns mounted on wooden trucks with ten or eleven guns per side. The gun battery would be completed by four to six minions (Note: A minion was a gun of 1,000 pounds with a 3.5-inch bore firing a 4-pound shot with a 4-pound powder charge.) guns mounted on wooden trucks on the quarterdeck (QD) with two to three guns per side.

== Commissioned service - 1694-1706 ==
She was commissioned under the command of Captain James Littleton for service in the North Sea. In 1696 she was under Captain Francis Hosier (until 1698) still serving in the North Sea. She became a guard ship at Plymouth in 1698. Later in 1698 she was under Captain William Moses (until 1699) while remaining as guard ship. In 1701 she came under Captain Richard Short for service in Irish Waters. In 1702 under Captain George Smith she sailed with an eastern convoy. She then patrolled in the North Sea in 1703.On 7 February 1704 she was under Captain John Trotter assigned to Sir Cloudesley Shovell's Fleet in the English Channel. she sailed to the West Indies in the autumn. On 29 April 1705 she was under Captain William Gray until his death then was under Captain Henry Turville. She returned to Home Waters in July 1705. September 1705 she was under the command of Captain John Castle for fishery protection in the English Channel.

== Loss ==
She was taken by four or five French privateers off Hastings on 6 June 1706. Captain Castle was killed during the action.
