= Eula Davis McEwan =

American geologist

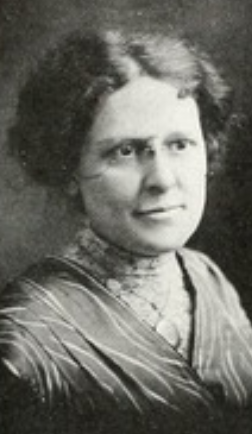
- Eula Davis McEwan, from the 1913 yearbook of Indiana University
- Born: Eula Grace Davis; January 6, 1879; Milford, Illinois
- Died: August 8, 1962; Lincoln, Nebraska
- Occupation(s): Paleontologist, geologist, college professor

Eula Grace Davis McEwan (January 6, 1879 – August 8, 1962) was an American geologist and paleontologist who taught at the University of Nebraska.

== Early life and education ==
Davis was born in Milford, Illinois, the daughter of Charles Neiswander Davis and Anna Cornelia Cuvelier Davis. Her father was a veteran of the American Civil War; her maternal grandparents were born in the Netherlands. She trained as a teacher in Indiana. As a young widow, she earned a bachelor's degree in 1913 and a master's degree in geology in 1914, both at Indiana University Bloomington; she completed doctoral studies at Columbia University in 1917. She was a member of Phi Beta Kappa.

== Career ==
McEwan was an aid in paleontology at the American Museum of Natural History from 1917 to 1918, and taught at Simpson College in Iowa. She was assistant professor of paleontology at the University of Nebraska until her retirement with emeritus status in 1940. During World War II, she served as curator of the invertebrate fossil collection at the university's museum.

McEwan was elected to membership in the Paleontological Society in 1918, and to membership in the American Association for the Advancement of Science (AAAS) in 1921. In Nebraska she was active in the Sigma Delta Epsilon organization for women in science, the American Association of University Women (AAUW), and in the Lincoln Woman's Club.

== Publications ==
- "A study of the Brachiopod Genus Platystrophia" (1919)
- "The Ordovician of Madison, Indiana" (1920)
- "Convexity of articulate brachiopods as an aid in identification" (1939)

== Personal life ==
Eula Davis married John Alvin McEwan in 1906; he died in 1908. She was hospitalized for burns in April 1962, and died in August 1962, in Lincoln, Nebraska, at the age of 83.
