= HMS Sorlings (1694) =

History

England
- Name: HMS Sorlings
- Ordered: 10 April 1693
- Builder: Richard Barrett, Shoreham
- Launched: 19 March 1694
- Commissioned: 1694
- Captured: 20 October 1705
- Fate: Captured by the French, retaken by the British February 1711 then sold

History

France
- Name: Sorlingue
- Acquired: 1709
- In service: 1709-11
- Captured: February 1711
- Fate: Taken by British but not re-added to Royal Navy, sold

General characteristics as built
- Class & type: 30-gun fifth rate
- Tons burthen: 36255/94 tons (bm)
- Length: 102 ft 8.5 in (31.31 m) gundeck; 85 ft 8 in (26.11 m) keel for tonnage
- Beam: 28 ft 2.5 in (8.598 m)
- Depth of hold: 10 ft 9 in (3.28 m)
- Propulsion: Sails
- Sail plan: Full-rigged ship
- Armament: 1703 Establishment 32/28 guns; 4/4 × demi-culverins (LD); 22/20 × 6-pdr guns (UD); 6/4 × 4-pdr guns(QD)

HMS Sorlings was a 32-gun fifth rate vessel built under contract at Shoreham in 1693/94. After commissioning she spent her time in trade protection services between Home Waters, North America, West Indies and the Mediterranean. She was captured by the French in October 1705. Incorporated into the French Navy, she was loaned to the Privateering squadron at Dunkerque then recaptured by the British in 1711 and sold.

She was the second vessel to bear the name Sorlings since it was used for a 28-gun Royalist Ship Named Royal James in 1654. Captured by Parliamentarians in 1654 and renamed Sorlings and Wrecked on 17 December 1717.

== Construction and specifications ==
She was ordered on 10 April 1693 to be built under contract by Richard Barrett of Shoreham. She was launched on 19 March 1694. Her dimensions were a gundeck of 102 feet 8.5 inches (31.31 metres) with a keel of 85 feet 8 inches (26.11 metres) for tonnage calculation with a breadth of 28 feet 2.5 inches (8.60 metres) and a depth of hold of 10 feet 9 inches (3.28 metres). Her builder's measure tonnage was calculated as 36255/94 tons (burthen).

The gun armament initially was four demi-culverins (Note: A demi-culverin was a gun of 3,400 pounds with a four-inch bore firing a 9.5-pound shot with an eight-pound powder charge) mounted on wooden trucks on the lower deck (LD) with two pair of guns per side. The upper deck (UD) battery would consist of between twenty and twenty-two sakers (Note: A sacar or saker was a gun of 1,400 pounds with a 3.5-inch bore firing a 5.5-pound shot with a 5.5-pound powder charge.) guns mounted on wooden trucks with ten or eleven guns per side. The gun battery would be completed by four to six minions (Note: A minion was a gun of 1,000 pounds with a 3.5-inch bore firing a 4-pound shot with a 4-pound powder charge.) guns mounted on wooden trucks on the quarterdeck (QD) with two to three guns per side.

== Commissioned Service - 1694-1705 ==
She was commissioned in 1694 under the command of Captain Fleetwood Ernes for service in New England in 1694, 1695, and 1696. Captain Richard Cotten took command in 1697 for a convoy to Iceland. He was followed by Captain John Worrell. She sailed for Newfoundland in 1698. Upon her return she sailed with a convoy for the Mediterranean arriving at Leghorn in November 1698. On 2 April 1701 she was commissioned under Captain Lord James Dursley (the later Earl of Berkley). In 1702 she was under Captain Jonathan Spann and assigned to Sir George Rooke's Fleet. She sailed to Newfoundland in 1703 then moved on to the Leeward Islands. On 22 August 1703 she was under Captain Thomas Campion until he was dismissed by court martial on 31 March 1704.On 1 April 1704 she was under Captain William Coney for service in the North Sea.

== Loss ==
She was taken by four French warships (including the 30-gun Le Jersey), along with HMS Blackwall and HMS Pendennis while escorting a homeward bond Baltic convoy on 20 October 1705. She was incorporated into the French Navy then loaned to the Dunkerque privateering squadron as Le Sorlingue in 1709. She was retaken by the British in February 1711 and sold.
