= Milcombe, Cornwall =

Hamlet in Cornwall, England

Coordinates: 50.3719°N 4.4901°W

Milcombe: Cornish: Kommelin
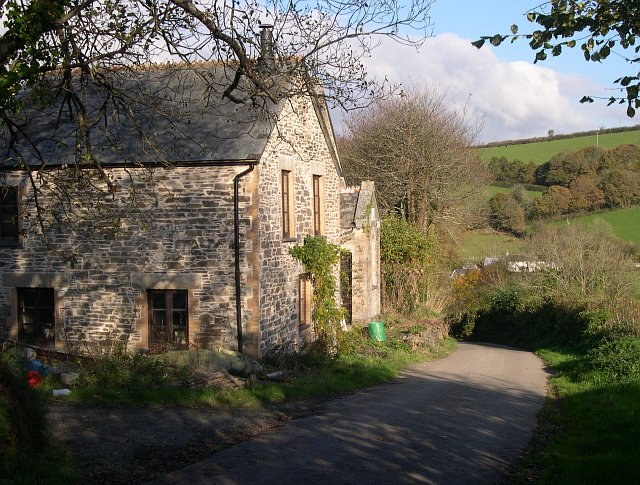
- Renovated houses at Milcombe

- Location within Cornwall
- OS grid reference: SX230554
- Civil parish: Pelynt
- Unitary authority: Cornwall
- Ceremonial county: Cornwall
- Region: South West
- Country: England
- Sovereign state: United Kingdom

Milcombe (Cornish: Kommelin) is a hamlet in the parish of Pelynt in Cornwall, England. Milcombe is in the valley of the West Looe River south of Sowden's Bridge and east of Muchlarnick.
