= Alternative Ulster Covenant =

Political declaration of 1912

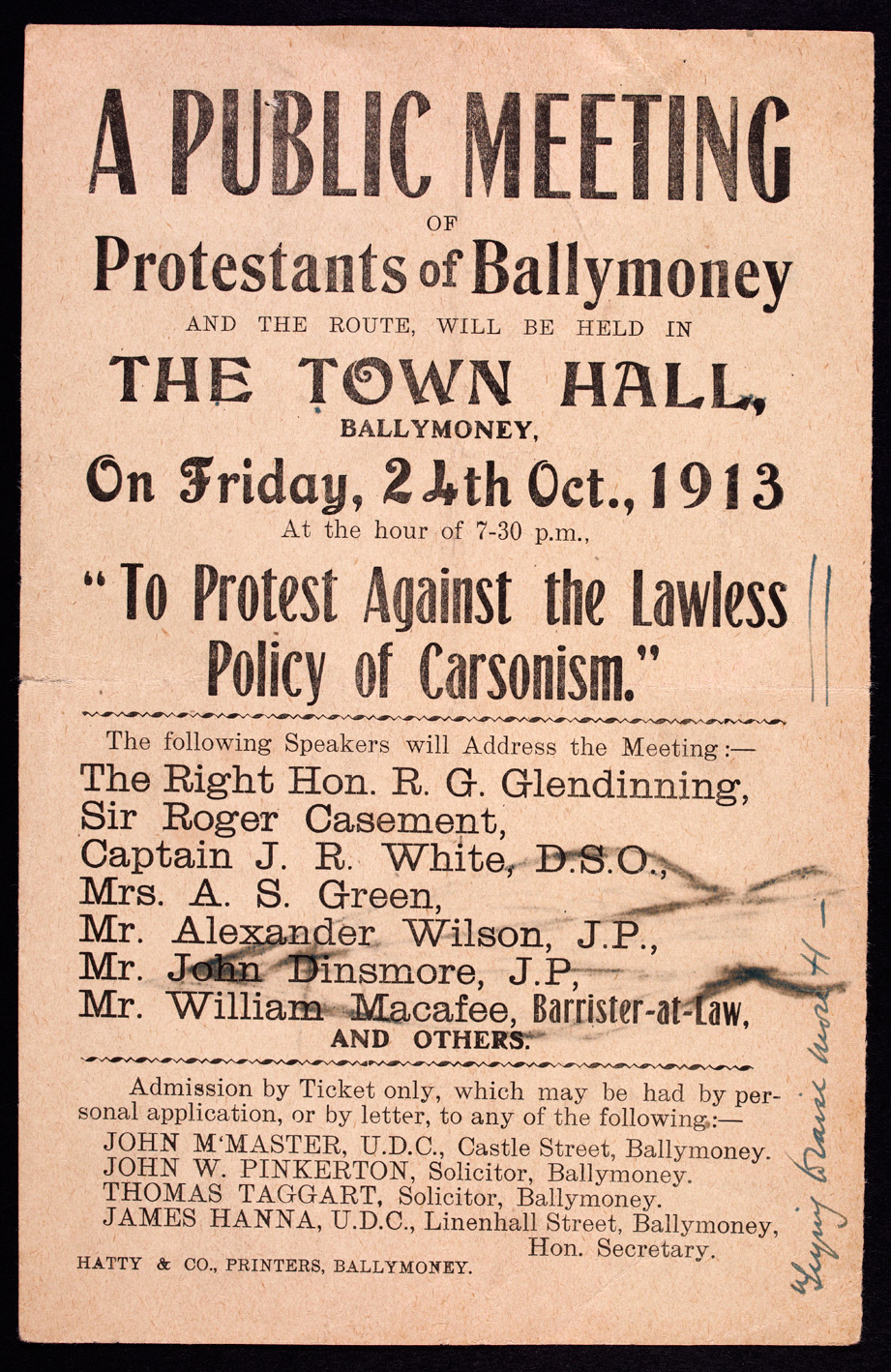
Leaflet for the meeting

The Alternative Ulster Covenant was a declaration launched at a public meeting held at Ballymoney, County Antrim, in October 1913 in reaction to the Ulster Covenant of 28 September 1912. Speakers included Sir Roger Casement, Alice Stopford Green and Captain Jack White.

The original Ulster Covenant, signed by the unionist leader, Sir Edward Carson, and by just under half a million men and women from Ulster, protested against the Third Home Rule Bill, introduced by the British Government in that same year. The essence of the Alternative Covenant was to dispute the anti-Home Rule assertions and lawless policies (the arming of the Ulster Volunteers) of "Carsonism".

Proposed by Jack White, it sought to match the Ulster Covenant with the pledge: "We intend to abide by the just laws of the lawful parliament of Ireland until such time as it may prove itself hostile to democracy, in sure confidence that God will stand by those who stand by the people irrespective of class or Creed." Circulated at some peril across County Antrim, the alternative covenant collected some 12,000 signatures.

The movement is notable because it was a largely Protestant organisation, at a time when the vast majority of Protestants were unionist. Failing to gather momentum, The Times of London dismissed it as representing "small pocket of dissident Protestants, the last survivors of the Old Liberals.”

== See also ==
- Ulster Covenant
- Unionism in Ireland
- Protestantism in Ireland
- Partition of Ireland
