= Marysville High School =

Marysville High School may refer to:

- Marysville High School (California)
- Marysville High School (Michigan)
- Marysville High School (Ohio)
