= Milford Township, Iroquois County, Illinois =

Milford Township
- Township
- Location in Iroquois County

- Iroquois County's location in Illinois
- Coordinates: 40°37′40″N 87°42′41″W
- Country: United States
- State: Illinois
- County: Iroquois
- Established: November 6, 1855

Area
  - Total: 44.34 sq mi (114.8 km^{2})
  - Land: 44.34 sq mi (114.8 km^{2})
  - Water: 0 sq mi (0 km^{2}) 0%
- Elevation: 636 ft (194 m)

Population (2020)
  - Total: 1,475
  - Density: 33.27/sq mi (12.84/km^{2})
- Time zone: UTC-6 (CST)
  - Summer (DST): UTC-5 (CDT)
- ZIP code: 60953
- FIPS code: 17-075-49061

Milford Township is one of twenty-six townships in Iroquois County, Illinois, USA. As of the 2020 census, its population was 1,475 and it contained 774 housing units.

== Geography ==
According to the 2021 census gazetteer files, Milford Township has a total area of 44.34 square miles (114.84 km^{2}), all land.

=== Cities, towns, villages ===
- Milford

=== Unincorporated towns ===
- Bryce at 40.634481°N 87.756697°W

(This list is based on USGS data and may include former settlements.)

=== Cemeteries ===
The township contains these three cemeteries: Maple Grove, Old Milford and Vennum.

=== Major highways ===
- Illinois Route 1

=== Airports and landing strips ===
- Milford Airport

== Demographics ==
As of the 2020 census there were 1,475 people, 753 households, and 498 families residing in the township. The population density was 33.26 inhabitants per square mile (12.84/km^{2}). There were 774 housing units at an average density of 17.46 per square mile (6.74/km^{2}). The racial makeup of the township was 92.61% White, 0.20% African American, 0.07% Native American, 0.34% Asian, 0.00% Pacific Islander, 2.03% from other races, and 4.75% from two or more races. Hispanic or Latino of any race were 4.61% of the population.

There were 753 households, out of which 26.30% had children under the age of 18 living with them, 45.29% were married couples living together, 14.61% had a female householder with no spouse present, and 33.86% were non-families. 29.10% of all households were made up of individuals, and 13.30% had someone living alone who was 65 years of age or older. The average household size was 2.15 and the average family size was 2.55.

The township's age distribution consisted of 19.7% under the age of 18, 6.9% from 18 to 24, 20.7% from 25 to 44, 29% from 45 to 64, and 23.6% who were 65 years of age or older. The median age was 47.3 years. For every 100 females, there were 91.4 males. For every 100 females age 18 and over, there were 93.6 males.

The median income for a household in the township was $48,942, and the median income for a family was $65,250. Males had a median income of $42,656 versus $27,554 for females. The per capita income for the township was $30,190. About 4.2% of families and 11.1% of the population were below the poverty line, including 7.3% of those under age 18 and 7.1% of those age 65 or over.

Historical population
Census	Pop.	Note	%±
2000	1,829		—
2010	1,659		−9.3%
2020	1,475		−11.1%
U.S. Decennial Census

== Political districts ==
- Illinois' 15th congressional district
- State House District 105
- State Senate District 53
