= Milford Parkway =

Milford Parkway may refer to:

- Milford Parkway (Ohio), near Cincinnati, Ohio connecting Interstate 275 with U.S. Route 50 (also known as Ohio State Route 450)
- Milford Parkway (Connecticut), freeway in Connecticut serving as a connection between Interstate 95 and Route 15 (also known as State Road 796)
