= HMS Pembroke (1690) =

Ship

History

England
- Name: HMS Pembroke
- Ordered: 28 June 1689
- Builder: Royal Dockyard, Deptford
- Launched: 3 March 1690
- Commissioned: 1690
- Captured: 23 February 1694
- Fate: Captured by French and ran ashore

General characteristics
- Type: 32-gun fifth rate
- Tons burthen: 35634/94 bm
- Length: 105 ft 6 in (32.2 m) gundeck; 90 ft 6 in (27.6 m) keel for tonnage
- Beam: 27 ft 2.5 in (8.3 m)
- Depth of hold: 10 ft 2 in (3.1 m)
- Sail plan: ship-rigged
- Armament: as Built; 4 × 4 demi-culverines on wooden trucks (LD); 20 × sakers on wooden trucks (UD); 4 × 4 minions on wooden trucks (QD)

HMS Pembroke was a fifth rate built under the 1689 programme built at Deptford Dockyard. Her guns were listed under old terms for guns as demi-culverines, (Note: A demi-culverine was a gun of 3,400 pounds with a four-inch bore firing a 9.5-pound shot with an eight-pound powder charge.) sakers (Note: A sacar or saker was a gun of 1,400 pounds with a 3.5-inch bore firing a 5.5-pound shot with a 5.5-pound powder charge.) and minions. (Note: A minion was a gun of 1,000 pounds with a 3.5-inch bore firing a 4-pound shot with a 4-pound powder charge.) After commissioning she spent her short career in Home Waters and the West Indies. She was taken by the French and runashore in 1694.

Pembroke was the second name vessel since it was used for a 28-gun ship launched at Woolwich and sunk due to a collision with Fairfax off Portland in 1667.

== Construction ==
She was ordered on 28 June 1689 from Deptford Dockyard to be built under the guidance of Master Shipwright Fisher Harding. She was launched on 3 March 1690.

== Commissioned service ==
She was commissioned in 1690 under the command of Captain John Every, RN for service with the Fleet. She was off the Scottish coast in 1691. Her next commander was Captain George Warren, RN for service in Wheeler's squadron in the West Indies. With the death of Captain Warren on 20 April 1693, Captain Francis Hisley, RN took command until he died on 2 May 1693. On 17 January 1694 she came under command of Captain Rodger Bellwood, RN.

== Loss ==
HMS Pembroke was taken by a 40-gun French privateer Le Louis off the Lizard on 23 February 1694 then run ashore.
