= New Milford =

New Milford may refer to:

== United States ==
- New Milford, Connecticut, a town
  - New Milford (CDP), Connecticut, census-designated place comprising the town center
- New Milford, Illinois
- New Milford, New Hampshire, a fictitious town described in a hoax article
- New Milford, New Jersey
- New Milford, New York, a hamlet in Warwick
- New Milford, Ohio
- New Milford, Pennsylvania

== Wales ==
- New Milford, a name earlier used for Neyland railway station, Pembrokeshire, Wales
