= Mile End, Gloucestershire =

Village in Gloucestershire, England

Coordinates: 51.8033°N 2.5999°W

Mile End
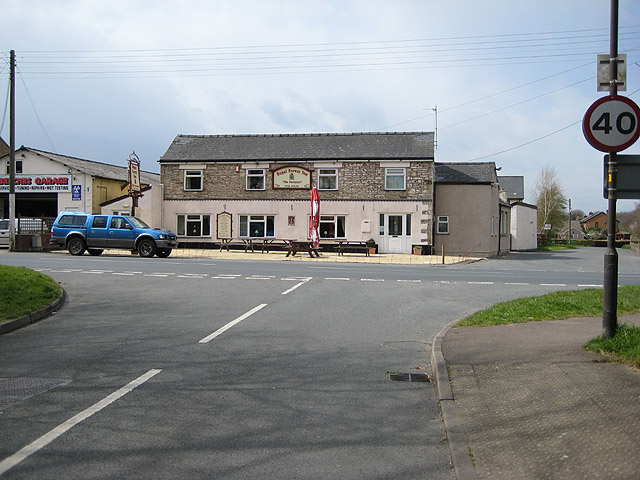
- Mile End and the Royal Forest Inn

- Location within Gloucestershire
- OS grid reference: SO587118
- Civil parish: Coleford
- District: Forest of Dean
- Shire county: Gloucestershire
- Ceremonial county: Gloucestershire
- Region: South West
- Country: England
- Sovereign state: United Kingdom
- Post town: Coleford
- Postcode district: GL16
- Dialling code: 01594
- Police: Gloucestershire
- Fire: Gloucestershire
- Ambulance: South Western

Mile End is a small village in the English county of Gloucestershire. It belongs to the civil parish of Coleford, which is also its post town. Mile End is 1 mile (1.6 km) northeast of Coleford. The village lies at the western edge of the Forest of Dean. The village merges with the village of Broadwell to the south.

== History ==
Mile End is situated on the road leading northeast out of Coleford. The road between Mile End and Poolgreen was known in 1317 as the Derkesty (later Dark Stile). It was an important route from Mitcheldean, and in the later 17th century traffic between Gloucester and South Wales used this route.

Five cottages were built on Crown land on the Five Acres road at Mile End in 1787. The inn originally known as the Royal Forester opened by the mid 1870s. The Primitive Methodists built a chapel, Mount Hermon, at Mile End in 1904. West Dean district council created a cemetery at Mile End for an area covering Milkwall, Berry Hill, and Lydbrook in 1967.
