= Milebush =

Hamlet in Kent, England

Coordinates: 51.187°N 0.509°E

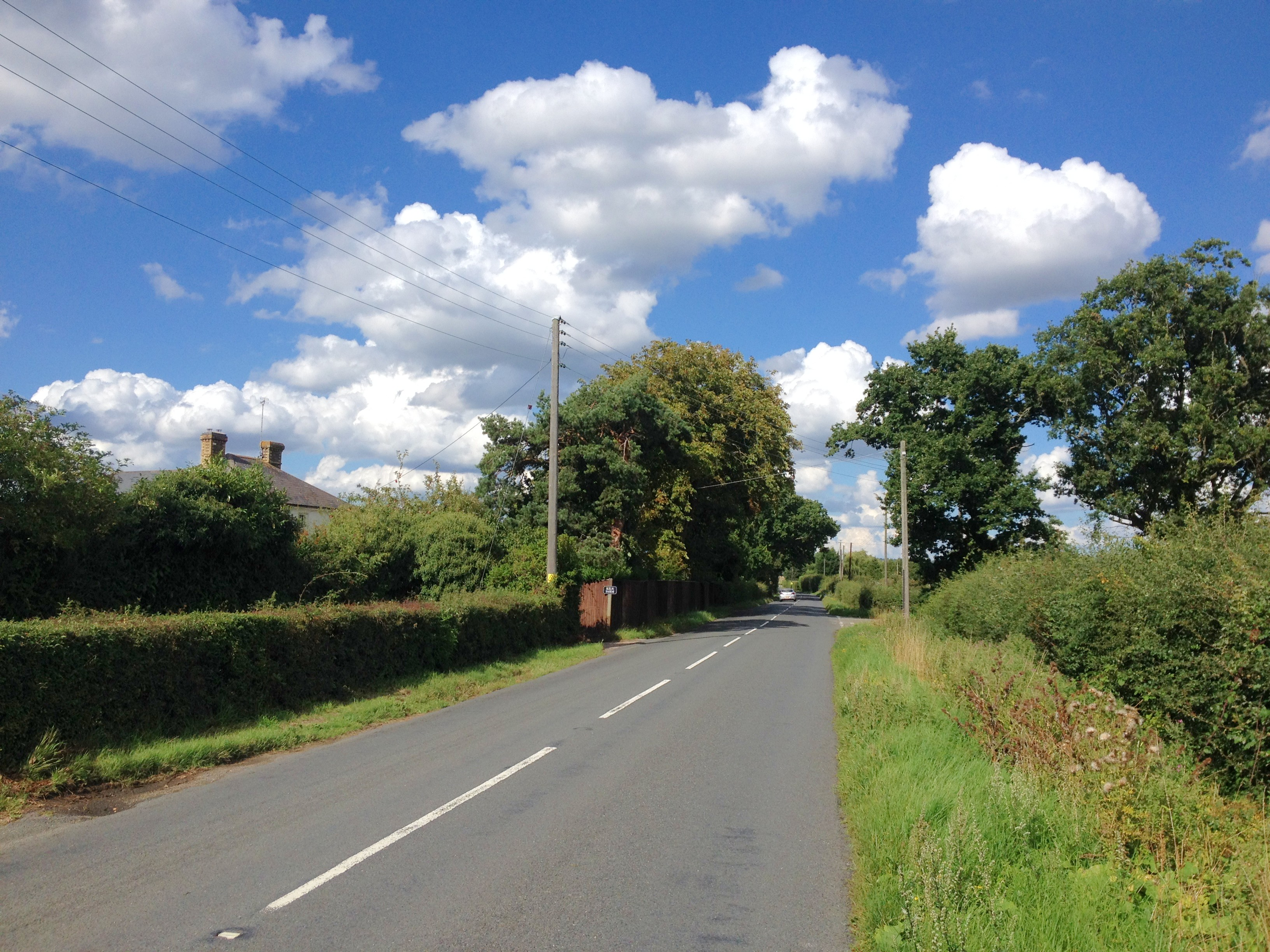
- Maidstone Road at Milebush

- Location within Kent
- District: Maidstone
- Shire county: Kent
- Region: South East
- Country: England
- Sovereign state: United Kingdom
- Post town: Tonbridge
- Postcode district: TN12
- Police: Kent
- Fire: Kent
- Ambulance: South East Coast
- UK Parliament: Weald of Kent

Milebush is a hamlet about one mile (1.6 km) north of Marden in the Maidstone district of Kent, England. It lies on the B2079 road surrounded by apple orchards.

== Notable people ==
- Beric Morley, English architectural historian
