= HMS Scarborough (1694) =

History

England
- Name: HMS Scarborough
- Ordered: 10 March 1693
- Builder: Woolwich Dockyard
- Launched: 15 February 1694
- Commissioned: January 1694
- Captured: 18 July 1694
- Fate: Taken by two French Privateers and incorporated in to French Service

France
- Name: Le Duc de Chaulnes
- Acquired: 1694
- In service: 1694–1697
- Captured: 15 February 1697
- Fate: Taken by two English men-of-war and renamed HMS Milford

England
- Name: HMS Milford
- Acquired: 15 February 1697
- Commissioned: 1700
- Fate: Wrecked on Cape Corrientes, Cuba on 18 June 1720

General characteristics as built
- Class & type: 30-gun fifth rate
- Tons burthen: 37435/94 tons (bm)
- Length: 104 ft 10 in (31.95 m) gundeck; 84 ft 5 in (25.73 m) keel for tonnage
- Beam: 28 ft 10.5 in (8.801 m)
- Depth of hold: 11 ft 7 in (3.53 m)
- Propulsion: Sails
- Sail plan: Full-rigged ship
- Armament: 1703 Establishment 32/28 guns; 4/4 × demi-culverins (LD); 22/20 × 6-pdr guns (UD); 6/4 × 4-pdr guns(QD)

General characteristics 1705 rebuild
- Class & type: 36-gun fifth rate
- Tons burthen: 42089/94 tons (bm)
- Length: 108 ft 7.5 in (33.11 m) gundeck; 88 ft 11 in (27.10 m) keel for tonnage
- Beam: 29 ft 10 in (9.09 m)
- Depth of hold: 11 ft 10.5 in (3.62 m)
- Propulsion: Sails
- Sail plan: Full-rigged ship
- Armament: 36/30 guns; 8/6 × 12-pdr guns (LD); 22/20 × 6-pdr guns (UD); 6/4 × 6-pdr guns (QD)

HMS Scarborough was a 32-gun fifth rate vessel built at Woolwich Dockyard in 1693/94. Shortly after being commissioned, she was taken by two French privateers and went under French service. She was recaptured in 1697 and renamed Milford. Milford spent some time off in Africa and the West Indies before being rebuilt in 1705. She was in the North Sea, the Mediterranean, and finally the West Indies, where she was wrecked in 1720.

She was the second vessel to bear the name Scarborough since it was used for a 10-gun ketch. The first Scarborough was built by Frame of Scarborough in 2 May 1691 and captured by the French on 12 January 1693.

As HMS Milford, she was the fourth named vessel since it was used for a 22-gun ship built by Page of Wivenhoe in 1654, originally named Fagons. Fagons was renamed Milford at the Restoration in May 1660 and burnt by accident at Leghorn on 7 July 1673.

== Construction and specifications ==
She was ordered on 10 March 1693 to be built at Woolwich Dockyard under the guidance of Master Shipwright Joseph Lawrence. Less than a year later, she was launched on 15 February 1694. Her dimensions were a gun deck of 104 feet 10 inches (31.95 metres) with a keel of 84 feet 5 inches (25.73 metres) for tonnage calculation, a breadth of 28 feet 10.5 inches (8.80 metres), and a depth of hold of 11 feet 7 inches (3.53 metres). Her builder's measure tonnage was calculated as 37435/94 tons (burthen).

The gun armament initially was four demi-culverins (Note: A demi-culverin was a gun of 3,400 pounds with a four-inch bore firing a 9.5-pound shot with an eight-pound powder charge) on the lower deck (LD) with two pair of guns per side. The upper deck (UD) battery consisted of between twenty and twenty-two sakers (Note: A sacar or saker was a gun of 1,400 pounds with a 3.5-inch bore firing a 5.5-pound shot with a 5.5-pound powder charge.), with ten or eleven guns per side. The gun battery was completed by four to six minions (Note: A minion was a gun of 1,000 pounds with a 3.5-inch bore firing a 4-pound shot with a 4-pound powder charge.) guns on the quarterdeck (QD) with two to three guns per side.

== Commissioned service ==
=== Service 1694 ===
She was commissioned under the command of Captain Thomas Killingworth for service in the Irish Channel. She was taken by the French privateers, the 36-gun Le Comte de Revel and the 22-gun L'Etoille off Tory Island, Northern Ireland on 18 July 1694. 32 of the crew were killed, including Captain Killingworth, and 10 were wounded. She was incorporated into the privateer squadron and renamed Le Duc de Chaulnes. A few years later, she was recaptured on 15 September 1697 by HMS Plymouth and HMS Rye, then renamed HMS Milford. She was recommissioned in 1700 under Captain William Moses for service on the coast of Africa. In 1701, she was attending on the King of Holland. In 1702, she was under Captain John Anderson. On 12 March 1703, she was assigned Captain Edward Windsor for service in the West Indies. Upon her return, she was ordered to be rebuilt at Deptford in 1705.

=== Rebuild at Deptford Dockyard 1705 ===
She was ordered to be rebuilt at Deptford Dockyard under the guidance of Master Shipwright Joseph Allin. She was launched andcompleted in December 1705. Her dimensions were a gundeck of 108 feet 7.5 inches (33.11 metres), with a keel of 88 feet 11 inches (27.10 metres) for tonnage calculation, a breadth of 29 feet 10 inches (9.09 metres), and a depth of hold of 11 feet 10.5 inches (3.62 metres). Her builder's measure tonnage was calculated as 42089/94 tons (burthen). Her armament was 36 guns wartime and 30 guns peacetime, consisting of eight/six 12-pounder guns on the lower deck (LD), twenty-two/twenty 6-pounder guns on the upper deck (UD), and six/four 6-pounder guns on the quarterdeck (QD).

=== Service 1705-1720 ===
She was commissioned in December 1705 under the command of Captain Philip Stanhope. She was off Ostend in June 1706 with Vice-Admiral Sir Stafford Fairborne to co-operate with the army in the siege of the town. The ships bombarded the town during the landing of troops, and Ostend capitulated on 25 June. In conjunction with HMS Fowey, Milford drove ashore and burnt the 60-gun Content, then took the French 42-gun Le Mercure on 8 January 1707. In March, she was escorting HMS Resolution conveying the Earl of Peterborough to Italy. The small convoy was spotted by a group of French ships. The Earl transferred to Enterprise and escaped to Leghorn along with Milford, while Resolution went ashore and was burnt to avoid capture.

Milford was in action at Minorca, where Captain Stanhope was killed on 17 September 1708. She came under the command of Captain John Goodhall until 1715, serving with Whittaker's Squadron in the winter of 1708/09 and remaining in the Mediterranean during 1709. She sailed with a Newfoundland convoy, then went back to the Mediterranean in 1711/12. She returned to Home Waters in 1715 and underwent a small repair at Woolwich, costing 1,099.11.9 1/2d (Note: A total cost accounting for inflation of approximately £195,200 in today's money) between September 1715 and February 1716. She was commissioned in 1718 under Captain Peter Chamberlain for service in Jamaica.

== Loss ==
She was wrecked on Cape Corrientes in Cuba on 18 June 1720. She lost most of her crew, including Captain Chamberlain.
