= USNS Milford =

History

United States
- Name: SS Greeley Victory
- Builder: Permanente Metals Yard No. 2, Richmond, California
- Laid down: 24 May 1945
- Launched: 4 July 1945
- Identification: IMO number: 5135575
- Fate: Scrapped, 1989

General characteristics
- Type: Type VC2-S-AP2 Victory ship
- Displacement: 4,512 long tons (4,584 t) light; 15,589 long tons (15,839 t) full load
- Length: 455 ft (139 m)
- Beam: 62 ft (19 m)
- Draft: 29 ft (8.8 m)
- Propulsion: Cross-compound steam turbine; 8,500 shp (6,338 kW); Single screw

USNS Milford (T‑AG‑187) was one of 12 ships scheduled to be acquired by the United States Navy in February 1966 and converted into Forward Depot Ships and placed into service with the Military Sea Transport Service, The Greeley Victory (MCV‑714) was chosen for this conversion and assigned the name Milford but the program was canceled and the ships were not acquired by the Navy.
