= Milford Township, Pike County, Pennsylvania =

Township in Pennsylvania, US

Milford Township
- Township
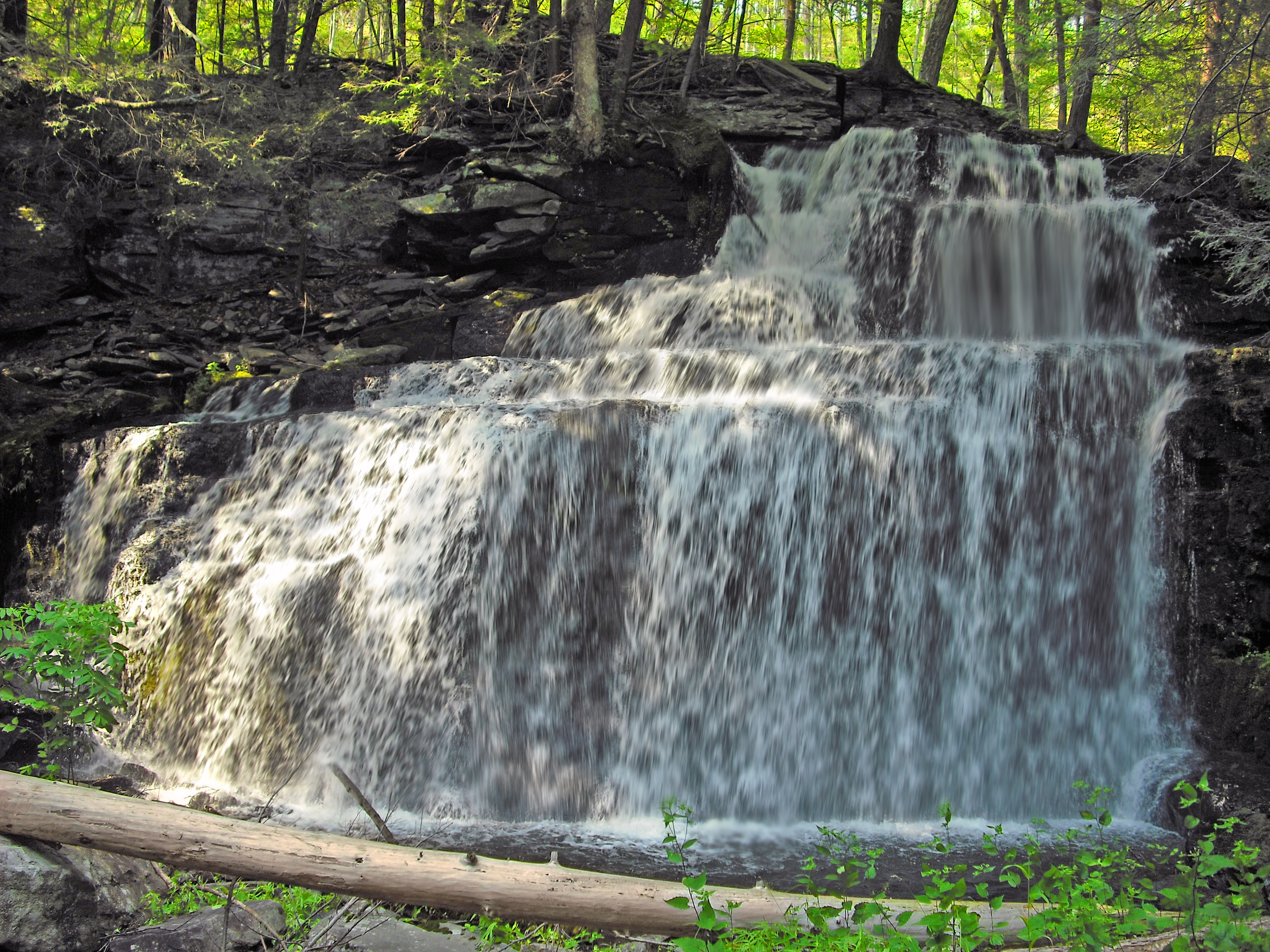
- Savantine Creek Falls in the Delaware State Forest

- Location in Pike County and the state of Pennsylvania.

- Location of Pennsylvania in the United States
- Coordinates: 41°23′00″N 74°50′59″W
- Country: United States
- State: Pennsylvania
- County: Pike

Area
  - Total: 13.16 sq mi (34.09 km^{2})
  - Land: 13.02 sq mi (33.71 km^{2})
  - Water: 0.15 sq mi (0.38 km^{2})
- Elevation: 1,362 ft (415 m)

Population (2020)
  - Total: 1,523
  - Density: 117.0/sq mi (45.18/km^{2})
- Time zone: UTC-5 (EST)
  - Summer (DST): UTC-4 (EDT)
- Area code: 570
- FIPS code: 42-103-49408
- Website: milfordtownshippike.com

Milford Township is a township in Pike County, Pennsylvania, United States. The population was 1,523 at the 2020 census.

== Geography ==
According to the United States Census Bureau, the township has a total area of 13.1 square miles (34 km^{2}), of which 13 square miles (33.9 km^{2}) is land and 0.1 square mile (0.05 km^{2}) (0.76%) is water.

== Demographics ==
Historical population
Census	Pop.	Note	%±
2000	1,292		—
2010	1,530		18.4%
2020	1,523		−0.5%

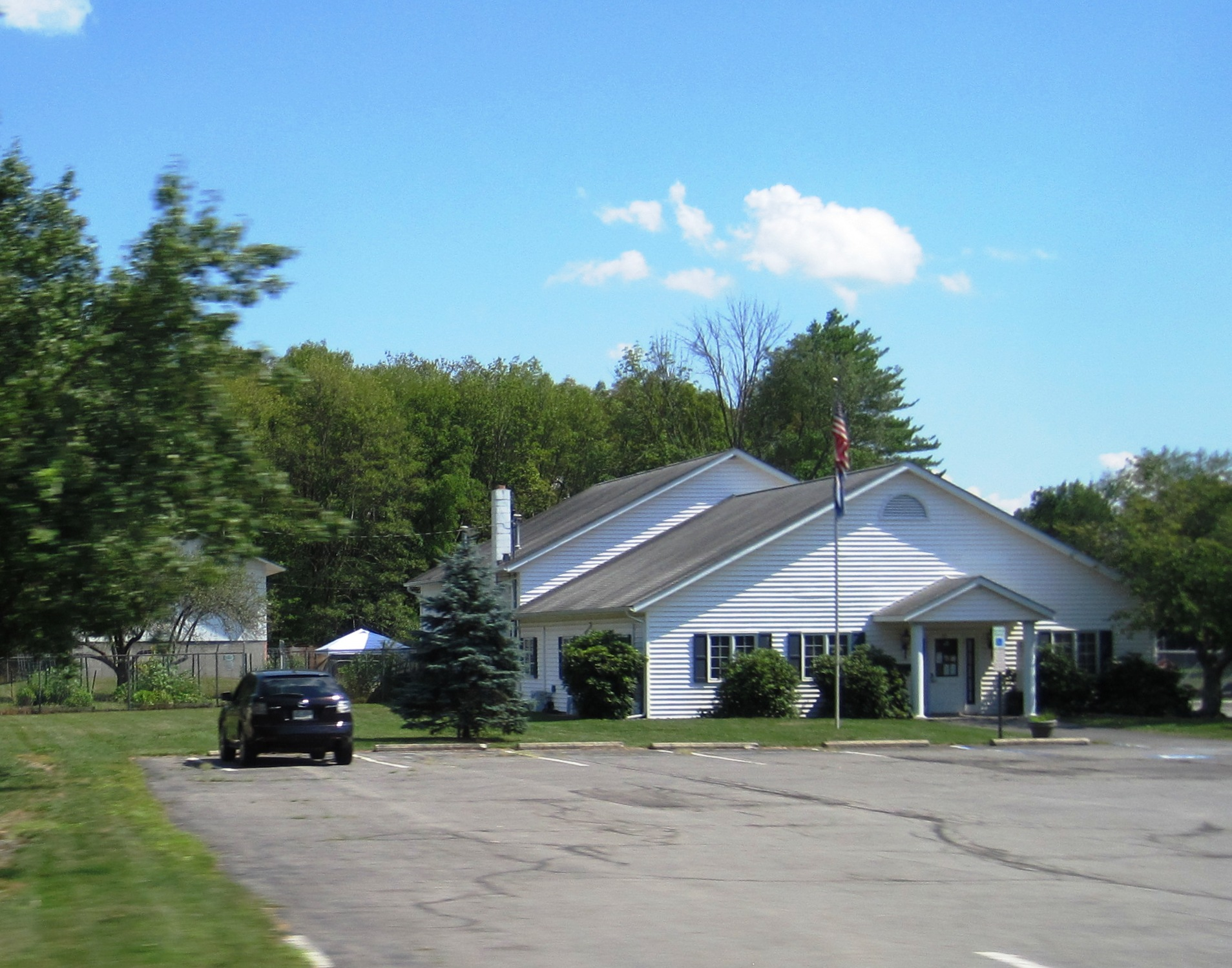
Milford Town Hall

As of the census of 2010, there were 1,530 people, 623 households, and 438 families residing in the township. The population density was 117.7 inhabitants per square mile (45.4/km^{2}). There were 730 housing units at an average density of 56.2 per square mile (21.7/km^{2}). The racial makeup of the township was 94.6% White, 1% African American, 0.5% Native American, 1.6% Asian, 0.1% Pacific Islander, 0.9% from other races, and 1.2% from two or more races. Hispanic or Latino of any race were 5.2% of the population.

There were 623 households, out of which 24.9% had children under the age of 18 living with them, 58.3% were married couples living together, 8.2% had a female householder with no husband present, and 29.7% were non-families. 25.2% of all households were made up of individuals, and 12% had someone living alone who was 65 years of age or older. The average household size was 2.46 and the average family size was 2.94.

In the township the population was spread out, with 20.2% under the age of 18, 59.7% from 18 to 64, and 20.1% who were 65 years of age or older. The median age was 48.4 years.

The median income for a household in the township was $48,264, and the median income for a family was $57,500. Males had a median income of $41,771 versus $31,146 for females. The per capita income for the township was $24,663. About 4.1% of families and 5.2% of the population were below the poverty line, including 5.7% of those under age 18 and 7.4% of those age 65 or over.
