= Mietshäuser Syndikat =

German cooperative non-commercial joint venture

Coordinates: 47.993277°N 7.840812°E

- Type: GmbH (~LLC)
- Industry: Property
- Founded: 1999
- Headquarters: Freiburg, Germany
- Number of locations: 191
- Area served: Germany
- Website: www.syndikat.org/en/

The Mietshäuser Syndikat (lit. 'apartment-house syndicate', abbreviated to MHS) is a cooperative, non-commercial joint venture in Germany that helps communities acquire long-term affordable living space via a legal, collective property arrangement. As of June 2024, there are 191 Hausprojekte (intentional communities of a roughly housing cooperative form) within the MHS, with 22 further initiatives looking for suitable property.

== Development ==
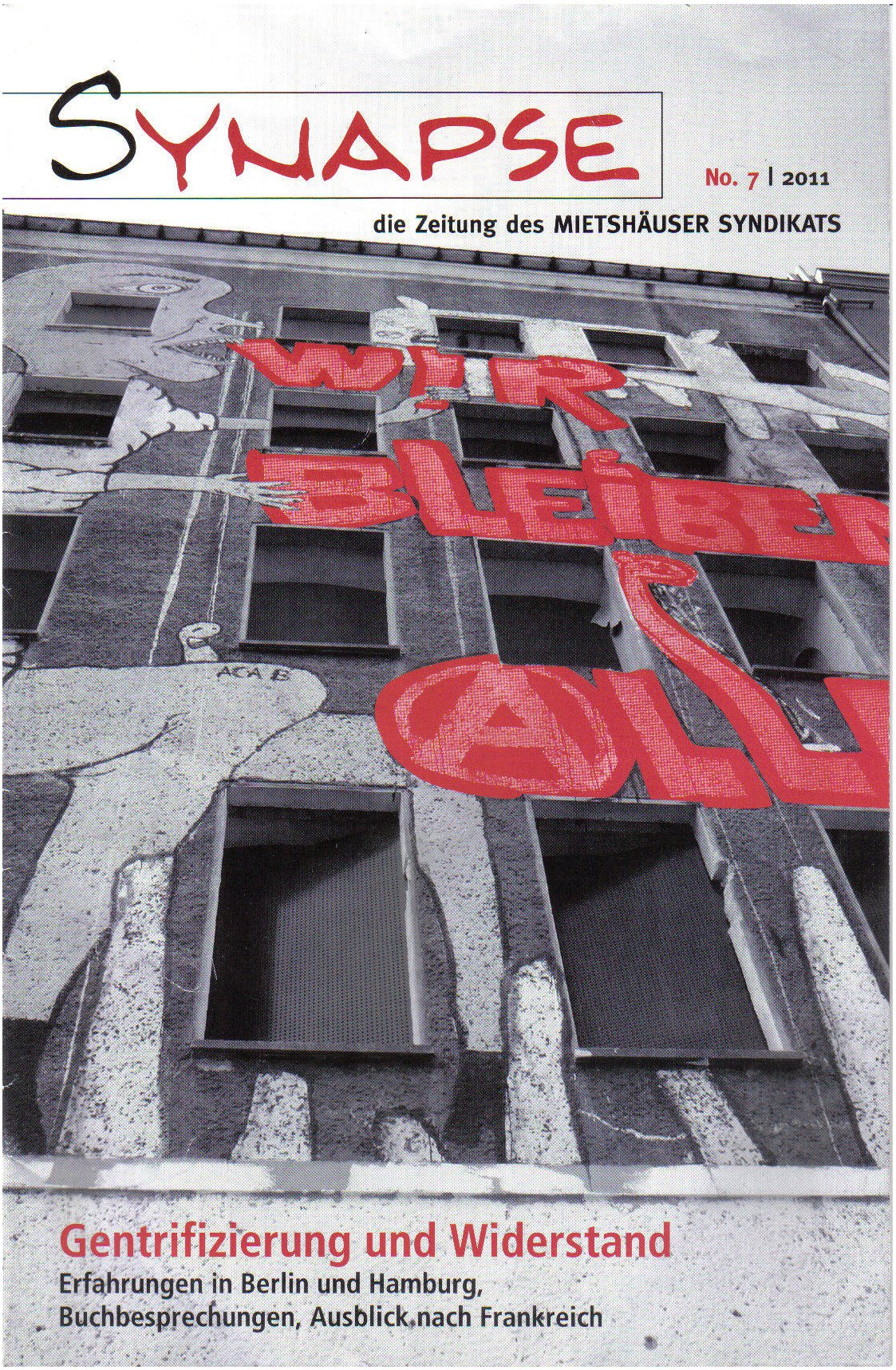
Synapse, newspaper of the Mietshãuser Syndikat, Nr. 7, 2011

The MHS was founded in 1992 in Freiburg im Breisgau by former squatters. As of September 2022, there are 177 MHS projects with over 3,800 residents and over 150,000 m^{2} of living space collectively: 17 accepted initiatives look for suitable property. The smallest object is a family house for 4 and the biggest is a former barracks of 4 buildings for 265. A regional coordination group for Tübingen was grounded in 2007, with further coordination groups for Bayern, Berlin-Brandenburg, Bremen, Dresden, Hamburg, Gießen, Leipzig, Marburg and Nordrhein-Westfalen developing since then.

After a 5-year break, Synapse, the newspaper of the MHS resumed print in 2011. The first issue was published in 2001.

Currently the MHS is working towards founding a 'syndicate foundation' (Syndikatstiftung).

== General structure ==
A group of people wishing to create a Hausprojekt within the MHS first form a legal association for their future living collective called a Hausverein (lit. 'House association') using the Verein form (abbreviated e. V.) This provides a legal basis for their collective organization and financing and is a requirement for joining the MHS. Further requirements include accepting a legal obligation to contribute to the MHS solidarity fund and a commitment to provide mutual aid to other Hausprojekte in future. With free assistance from the MHS, the Hausverein creates a general concept including financial plan before applying for membership to the MHS.

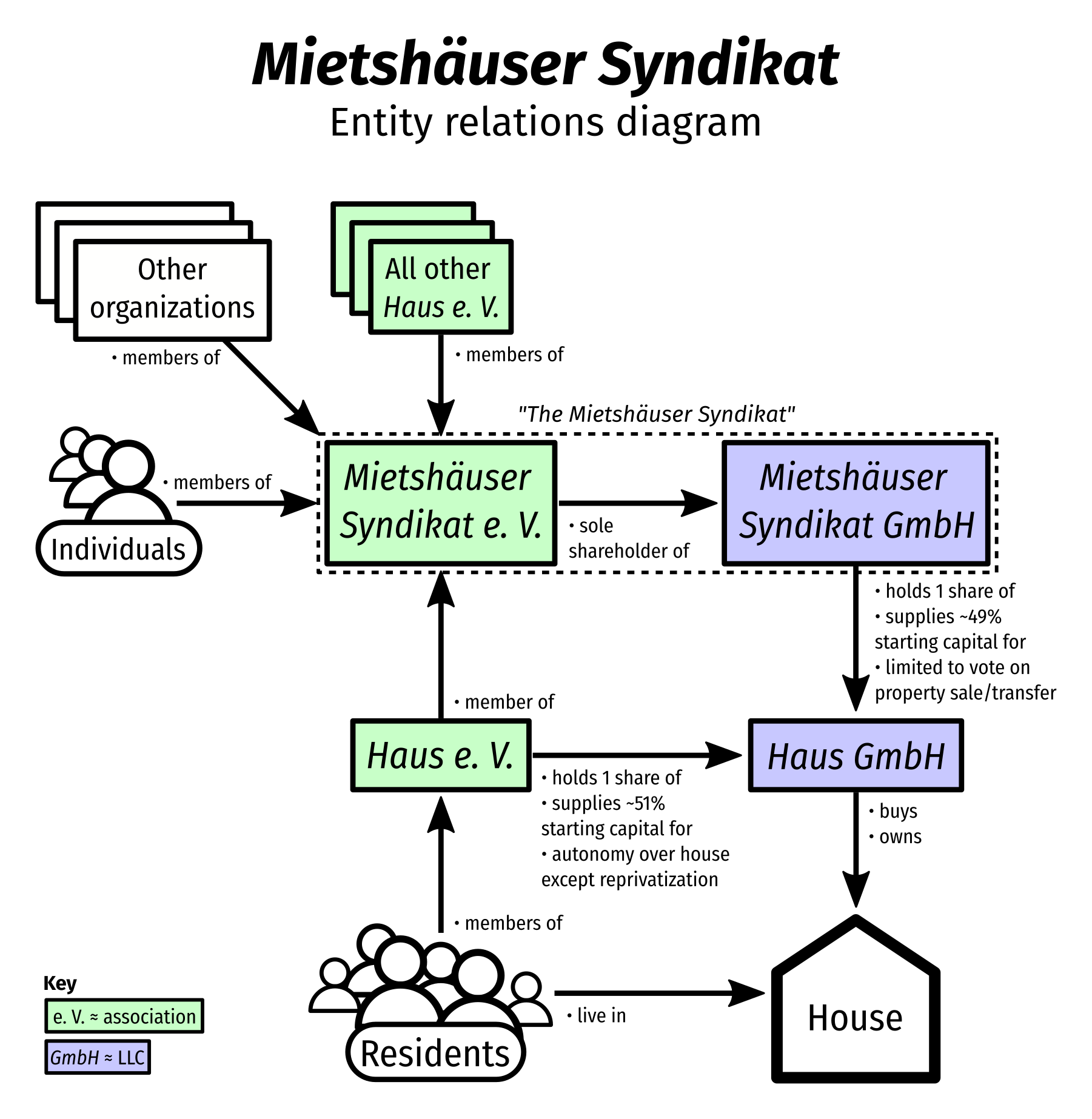
Diagram of the entities and their relationships within the MHS

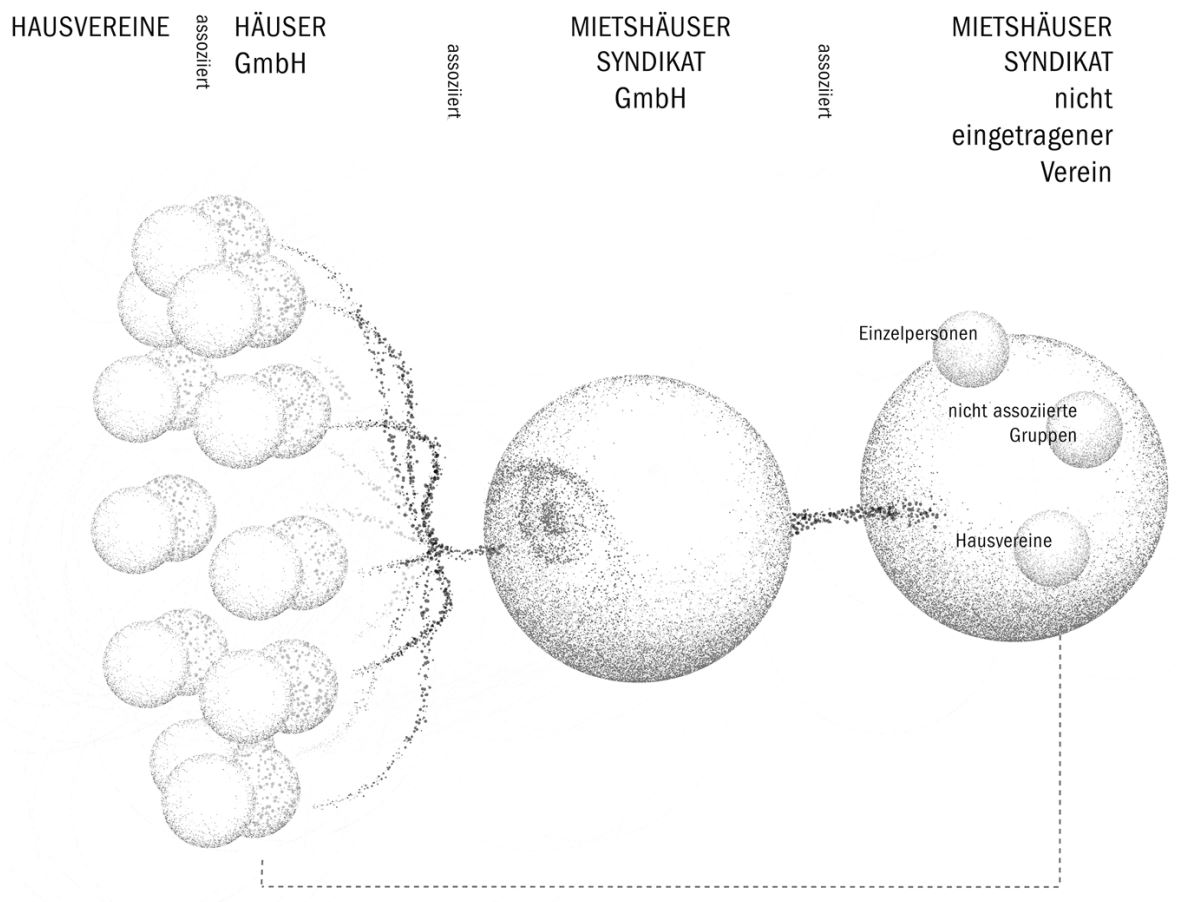
Artistic depiction of the MHS structure (Helfrich/Bollier 2019)

The MHS has two legal entities, an association (e. V.) and an LLC (GmbH). The association is the sole shareholder of the LLC; it is only possible to join the association. Members of the MHS include every accepted Hausverein, other associations and private individuals. The MHS holds general assemblies 3 or 4 times a year at which point Hausprojekte and their respective Hausvereine are considered for membership. Decisions are made by consensus.

Once a Hausverein is accepted into the MHS, a Haus GmbH (lit. 'House LLC') is created. The Haus GmbH owns the future property the living collective will inhabit and effectively ensures it will not be reprivatized. The foundation of the GmbH requires €25,000 starting capital, of which ~49% is attributed to the MHS (GmbH) and 51% to the Hausverein. The statute of the Haus GmbH gives the Hausverein near total autonomy on the use and development of the house, with the MHS having its voting rights limited to decisions affecting the sale or legal transfer of the property, or changes to the Haus GmbH articles of organization. On such topics, where both shareholders can vote, a majority is required and despite the difference in initial contribution, the MHS and Hausverein each have one, equal vote. This means both parties must mutually consent: either party can veto, and the MHS make clear they will veto any attempt at privatization.

Once the Haus GmbH is established, it raises money with direct loans from Hausverein members, their families and friends, and the MHS, with the rest coming from bank mortgage loans. As of November 2020, 170 million euros was tied up in MHS projects, with ~54% being bank loans, ~39% being direct loans and ~7 % being starting capital.

== Reception ==
=== Sustainability and sufficiency ===
Silke Helfrich and David Bollier consider the MHS an exemplary way of defending collective rights. An academic article claimed it is a means to reduce poverty and social inequality, supported by a report from BTU Cottbus which states that MHS projects pay significantly less rent than average.

For Nir Barak, the projects are an expression of a broadly applied citizen engagement. Enrico Schönberg sees the potential for mechanisms in the MHS concept to be transferred into the societal realm.

Judith Very finds the MHS to be a functioning combination of anarchist, direct democratic and Marxist approaches that has situated itself alongside the dominant perception of a "uniform capitalism". Bettina Barthel describes the use of the limited company by the MHS to decommercialize living space as "legal hacking". The MHS is for Ivo Balmer and Tobias Benet a success model.

Kenton Card argues for the consideration of state funding to escalate the spread of the model. The Stadtbodenstiftung Berlin (lit. 'City land foundation Berlin'), a Community Land Trust, describes the MHS as being ideologically aligned.

=== Risks for investors ===
There are risks for possibles investors: to finance the projects, a significant deposit is necessary which the Hausvereine and Haus-GmbH typically don't have. Banks require a deposit as additional security when issuing mortgages. The Haus-GmbH gather the required money from private individuals as deliberately low-interest, subordinated loans. In the case of Haus-GmbH insolvency, these private loans are paid back secondarily after the bank loans, thus they carry risk for their entire duration. The MHS informs about one case of insolvency in 2010 on its homepage, and advises distributing larger loans across multiple projects to reduce risk. Stiftung Warentest, a German consumer organisation, recommended in one publication to only invest manageable sums of money, and that investment is not suited for purely financial reasons due to the risk relative to (low) returns.

== Attacks on the project ==
Two attempted arson attacks were targeted against a MHS project on Jagowstraße 15 in Berlin Spandau within two weeks in 2021. Due to previously noticed Nazi-related graffiti, state security and the criminal court of Berlin took up the investigation. A year later, a structure in the backyard of another project in Berlin, Grünberger Straße 73 was burnt down. In Hesse, several projects were the target of arson attacks, too.

== Influence ==
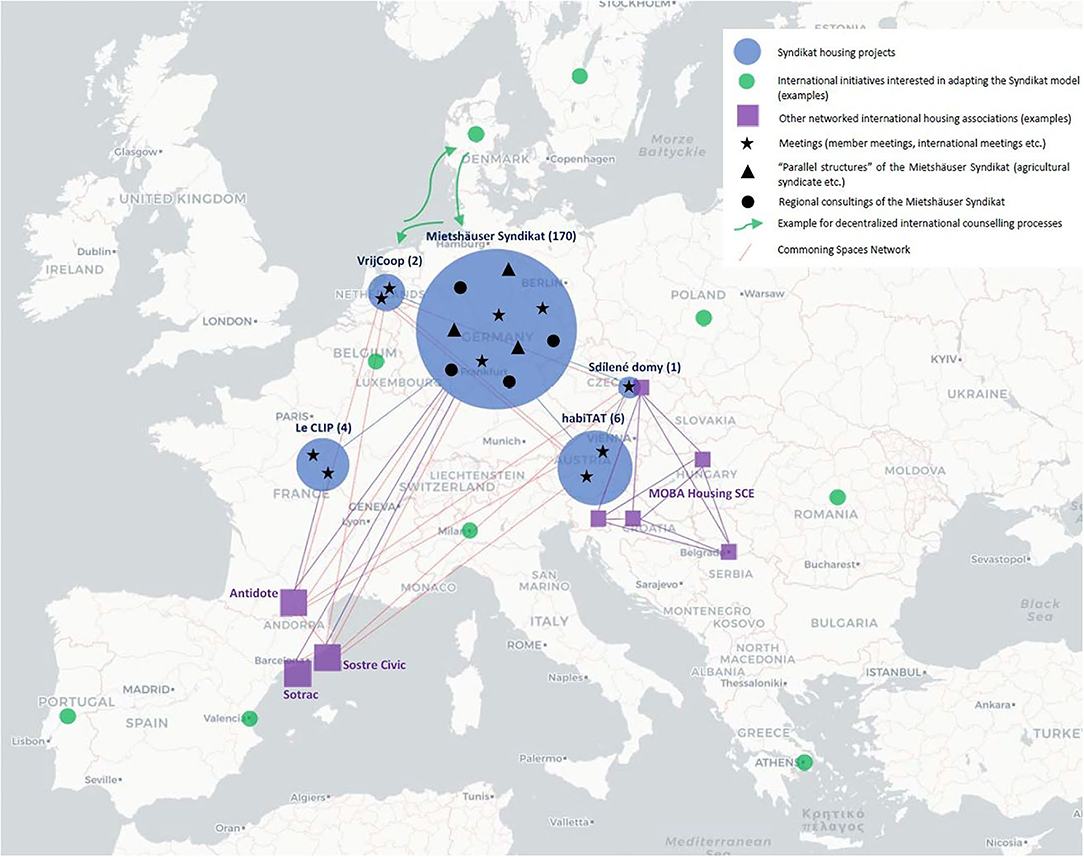
Diagram showing MHS, other syndicates and adjacents in continental Europe, 2021

Le Clip was founded in 2010 to adapt the MHS model for people in France.

Genossenschaft Mietshäuser MHS (lit. 'Cooperative rental apartment syndicate') was founded in 2014 in Switzerland. After discussing with similar initiatives in Switzerland, they chose to use the Genossenschaft (Cooperative) form in their model instead of the GmbH (LLC) to relate to a tradition of cooperatives in their country since the LLC offered no additional advantages in Switzerland.

HabiTAT was also founded in 2014 in Austria, transferring the legal structure of the MHS into the Austrian legal frame.

Sdílené domy (lit. 'Shared Houses') was founded in 2015 as a MHS inspired organization for the Czech Republic.

VrijCoop (lit. 'Free coop') was founded in 2017 in the Netherlands, translating the MHS model to the Dutch situation. In place of the GmbH (LLC), VrijCoop uses the vereniging (association).

Radical Routes, a secondary cooperative networking British housing cooperatives, published a report in 2014 reflecting on weaknesses within their model such as carpet bagging where established co-ops significantly reduce their rent or, rarely, sell their property for private gain. In it they consider the Mietshäuser Syndikat model to have provably solved that issue.
