= HMS Milford (1690) =

History

England
- Name: HMS Milford
- Ordered: 28 June 1689
- Builder: Royal Dockyard, Woolwich
- Launched: 18 March 1690
- Commissioned: 10 March 1690
- Captured: 1 December 1693
- Fate: Captured by French

General characteristics
- Type: 32-gun fifth rate
- Tons burthen: 35562/94 bm
- Length: 105 ft 2 in (32.1 m) gundeck; 88 ft 5 in (26.9 m) keel for tonnage
- Beam: 27 ft 6 in (8.4 m)
- Depth of hold: 10 ft 0 in (3.0 m)
- Sail plan: ship-rigged
- Armament: as Built; 4 × 4 demi-culverines on wooden trucks (LD); 20 × sakers on wooden trucks (UD); 4 × 4 minions on wooden trucks (QD)

HMS Milford was a fifth-rate built under the 1689 programme at the Deptford Dockyard. Her guns were listed under old terms for guns as demi-culverines, (Note: A demi-culverine was a gun of 3,400 pounds with a four-inch bore firing a 9.5-pound shot with an eight-pound powder charge.) sakers (Note: A sacar or saker was a gun of 1,400 pounds with a 3.5-inch bore firing a 5.5-pound shot with a 5.5-pound powder charge.) and minions. (Note: A minion was a gun of 1,000 pounds with a 3.5-inch bore firing a 4-pound shot with a 4-pound powder charge.) After being commissioned, she spent her short career in Newfoundland and Home Waters. She was taken by the French in 1693.

Milford was the second vessel to carry the name Milford. The name was first used for a 22-gun ship launched by Robert Page of Wivenhoe in 1654. Originally named St. Fagans, it was renamed Milford in 1660 and burnt by accident at Leghorn on 7 July 1673.

== Construction ==
She was ordered on 28 June 1689 from Woolwich Dockyard, to be built under the guidance of Master Shipwright Joseph Lawrence. She was launched on 18 March 1690.

== Commissioned service ==
She was commissioned on 10 March 1690 under the command of Captain Charles Hawkins, RN for service on the Newfoundland fisheries. In 1692, she came under command of Captain Rodger Vaughan for service in the North Sea.

== Loss ==
HMS Milford was taken by a squadron of four French ships off Oxfordness, losing 16 members of her crew, who were killed on 1 December 1693. She served in the French Navy as Le Milford or Le Milfort until 1702.
