= Milford High School =

Milford High School may refer to:

- Milford High School (Connecticut) – a former high school in Milford, Connecticut (1842–1983)
- Milford High School (Delaware) — Milford, Delaware
- Milford High School (Massachusetts) — Milford, Massachusetts
- Milford High School (Michigan) — Highland, Michigan
- Milford High School (New Hampshire) — Milford, New Hampshire
- Milford High School (Ohio) — Milford, Ohio
- Milford High School (Texas) — Milford, Texas
- Milford High School (Utah) — List of high schools in Utah
- New Milford High School (Connecticut) — New Milford, Connecticut
- New Milford High School (New Jersey) — New Milford, New Jersey
- West Milford High School — West Milford, New Jersey
