= List of ship launches in 1698 =

The list of ship launches in 1698 includes a chronological list of some ships launched in 1698.

Date	Ship	Class	Builder	Location	Country	Notes
3 March	Hampshire	Fourth rate	Taylor	Rotherhithe	England	For Royal Navy.
11 March	Aquila Valiera	San Lorenzo Zustinian-class ship of the line	Iseppo Depieri di Zuanne	Venice	Republic of Venice	For Venetian Navy.
11 March	Croce Rossa	San Lorenzo Zustinian-class ship of the line	Zuanne di Francesco Piccolo da Venezia	Venice	Republic of Venice	For Venetian Navy.
17 March	Winchester	Fourth rate	Richard Wells	Rotherhithe	England	For Royal Navy.
March	Kent	Third rate	John & Richard Wells	Deptford Dockyard	England	For Royal Navy.
18 April	Salisbury	Fourth rate	Richard and James Herring	Beaulieu River	England	For Royal Navy.
27 April	Orford	Third rate	Edward Snelgrove	Deptford	England	For Royal Navy.
30 April	Resolution	Third rate	Robert Lee	Harwich Dockyard	England	For Royal Navy.
16 May	Carlisle	Fourth rate	Elias Waffe	Plymouth Dockyard	England	For Royal Navy.
31 May	Somerset	Third rate	Lee	Chatham Dockyard	England	For Royal Navy.
31 May	Worcester	Fourth rate	Winter	Southampton	England	For Royal Navy.
12 September	Bedford	Third rate	Fisher Harding	Woolwich Dockyard	England	For Royal Navy.
October	Maurepas	Fourth rate		Lorient	Kingdom of France	For French Navy.
24 November	Jersey	Fourth rate	Moore and Nye	East Cowes	England	For Royal Navy.
Unknown date	Gouda	Third rate	Hendrik Cardinaal	Amsterdam	Dutch Republic	For Dutch Navy.
Unknown date	Hardenbroek	Fourth rate		Amsterdam	Dutch Republic	For Dutch Navy.
Unknown date	Nassau	Third rate	Adrian Janszoon de Vriend	Vlissingen	Dutch Republic	For Dutch Navy.
Unknown date	San José	Galleon	Pedro di Aróstegui	Usurbil	Spain	For Spanish Navy.
