= George Walker (privateer) =

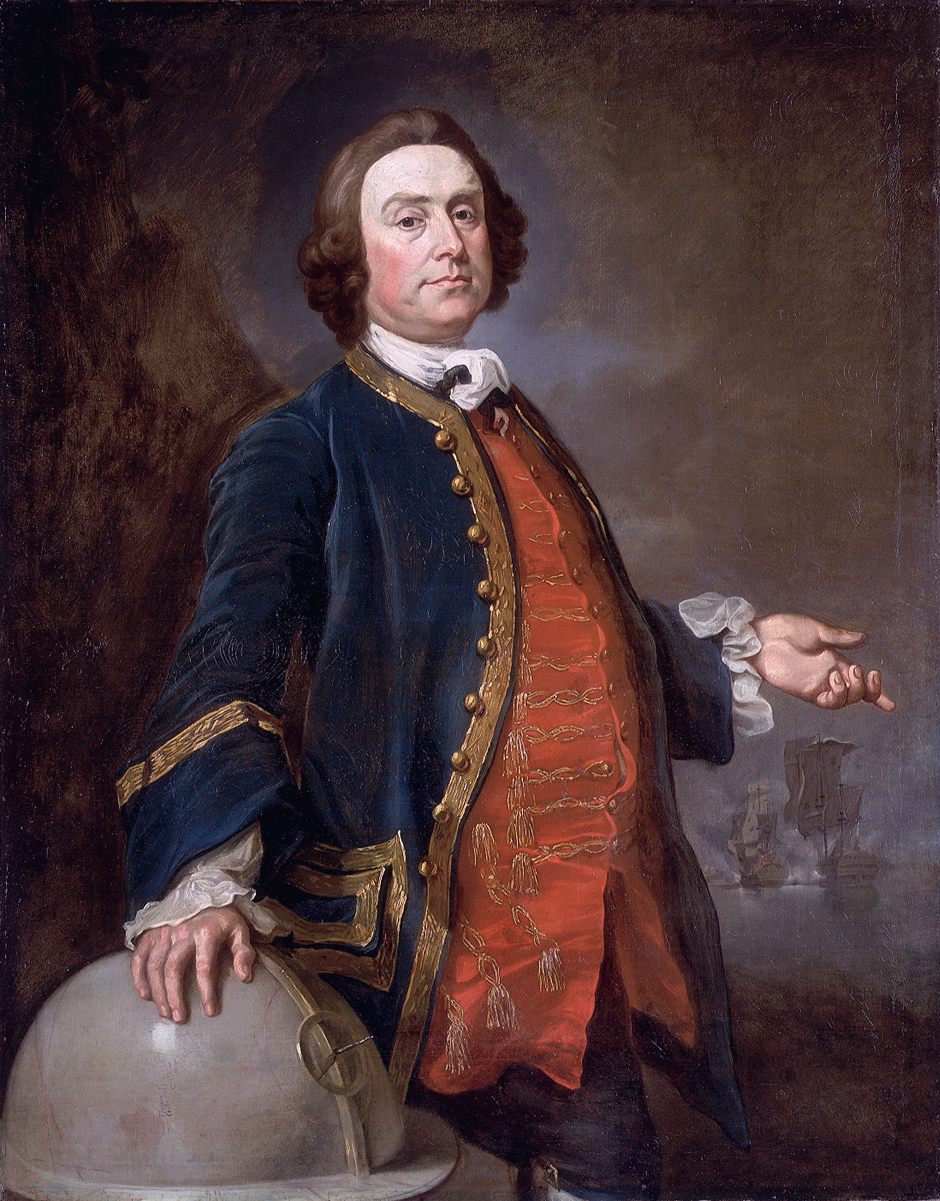
Commodore George Walker (before 1700 - 1777), ca. 1750

George Walker (died 1777) was an English privateer active against French shipping.

== Early life ==
Walker, as a lad and a young man, served in the Dutch States Navy, and served in the Levant protecting Dutch merchant shipping against Ottoman pirates. Later on he became the owner of a merchant ship and commanded her for some years.

In 1739, he was principal owner and commander of the ship Duke William, trading from London to South Carolina, and, the better to prepare for defence, took out letters of marque. His ship mounted 20 guns, but had only thirty-two men. The coast of the Carolinas was infested by Spanish privateers, and, in the absence of any English man-of-war, Walker put the Duke William at the service of the colonial government. His offer was accepted; he increased the number of his men to 130, and succeeded in driving the Spanish ships off the coast. Towards the end of 1742 he sailed for England with three merchantmen in convoy. But in a December gale, as they drew near the Channel, the ship's seams opened. Walker, with her crew, managed to get on board one of the merchantmen, which was only just kept afloat.

When finally Walker arrived in town, he learned that his agents had allowed the insurance to lapse, and that he was a ruined man. For the next year he was master of a vessel trading to the Baltic Sea.

== Privateer ==
In 1744, when war broke out with France as part of the War of the Austrian Succession, he was offered the command of the Mars, a private ship of war of 26 guns, to cruise in company with another, the Boscawen, somewhat larger and belonging to the same owner. They sailed from Dartmouth in November, and on one of the first days of January 1744–5 fell in with two homeward-bound French ships of the line, which captured the Mars after the Boscawen had hurriedly deserted her. Walker was sent as a prisoner on board the Fleuron. On 6 January the two ships and their prize were sighted by an English squadron of four ships of the line, which separated and drew off without bringing them to action. Walker was treated with civility, and he was landed at Brest as a prisoner at large; within a month he was exchanged.

On returning to England Walker was put in command of the Boscawen, and sent out in company with the Mars, which had been recaptured and bought by her former owners. The two cruised with little success during the year, and, coming into the English Channel in December, the Boscawen, a weakly built ship, iron-fastened, almost fell to pieces; Walker managed run it ashore at St Ives on the north Cornish coast on 24 November 1745. He was almost immediately offered a larger command. This was a squadron of four ships — King George, Prince Frederick, Duke, and Princess Amelia—known collectively as the "Royal Family", which carried in the aggregate 121 guns and 970 men. In the summer of 1745, off Louisbourg, Nova Scotia, it had made a very rich prize; the ships were consequently well manned.

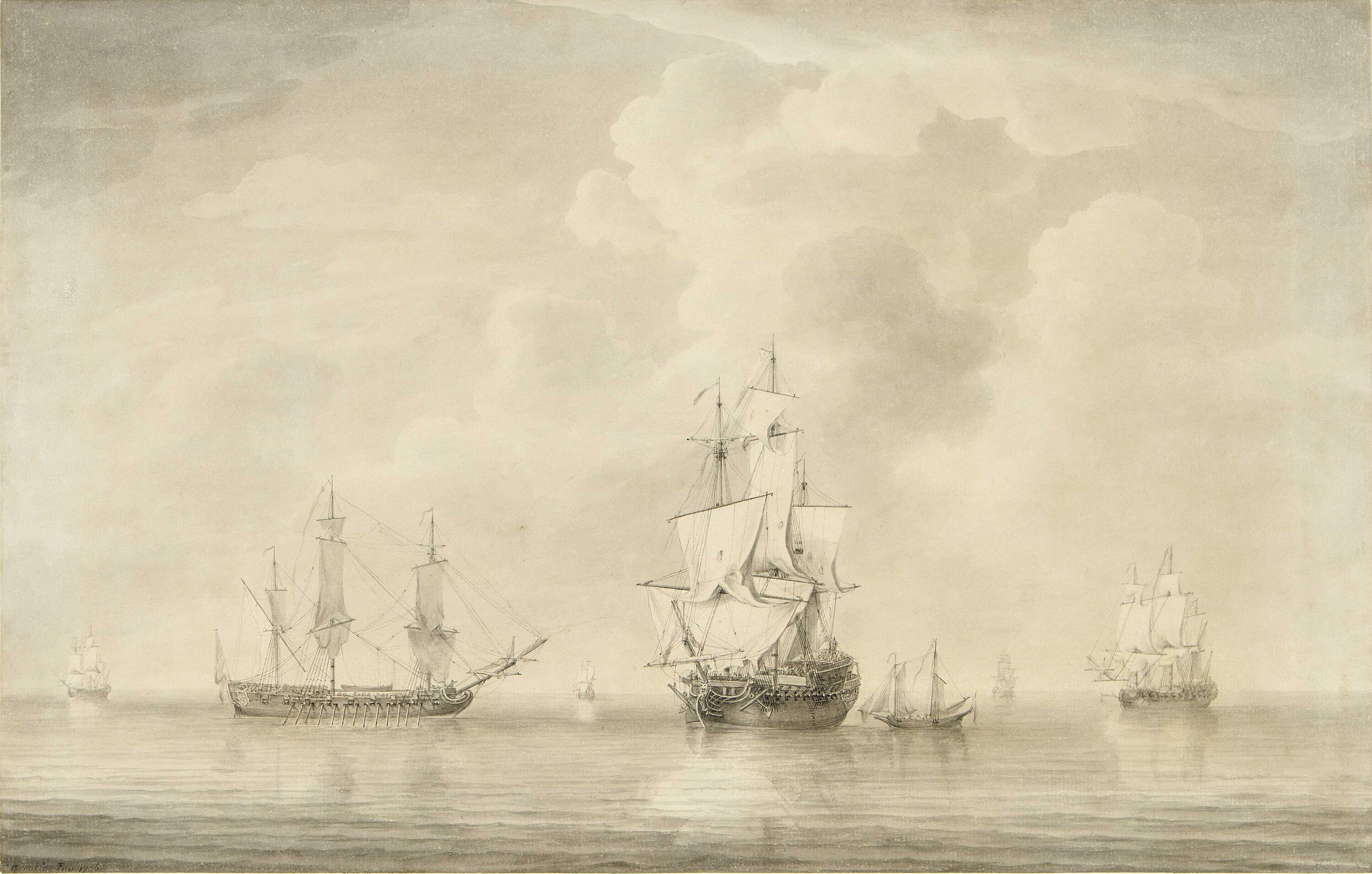
The taking of the Nuestra Senora de les Remedios off Louisbourg by the Prince Frederick, Duke and Prince George Privateers, 5th February 1746

After cruising for a year, and having made prizes for over £200,000 the Royal Family put into Lisbon; and, sailing again in July 1747, had been watering in Lagos Bay, when on 6 October a large ship was sighted standing in towards Cape St. Vincent. This was the Spanish 70-gun ship Glorioso, recently come from the Spanish Main with treasure on board. The treasure, however, had been landed at Ferrol, and she was now on her way to Cádiz. Walker took for granted that she had treasure, and attacked her in the King George, a frigate-built ship of 32 guns. She was nearly beaten; but on the Prince Frederick's coming up, the Glorioso, catching the same breeze, fled to the westward, where she was met and engaged by HMS Dartmouth, a ship of 50 guns. The Dartmouth blew up during the exchange, with the loss of most of her crew; but some hours later the 80-gun ship HMS Russell brought the Glorioso to action and succeeded in taking her. The Russell was only half manned, and was largely dependent on the privateers to take the prize into the River Tagus.

The Royal Family continued cruising, with moderate success, to the end of the war with the Treaty of Aix-la-Chapelle (1748). Altogether, the prizes taken by the Royal Family under Walker's command were valued at about £400,000.

== Revival of the fishery ==
Upon his arrival in England, at the end of the war, Walker, secure in the belief that he was entitled by his exertions to a modest fortune, took up with enthusiasm the cause of the revival of the British fisheries, which was then beginning to occupy public attention. In it he sank most of what he possessed before any distribution from the accounts of the Royal Family was made.

Walker did work of permanent value towards reviving the fisheries of the herring, of the cod and of the ling. On 23 June 1749, we find that 'Capt. Walker, late Commander of the Royal Family Privateers, in the Baltimore sloop, having on board several gentlemen appointed to fix on proper places for establishing a fishery on the coast of Scotland, fell down the River to Gravesend, and is bound to the Isles of Orkney and Zetland for that purpose' From the Orkney and Shetland Islands he sailed down the west coast visiting the islands, sounding the harbours, and obtaining a mass of information as to resources, food, fishing and other industries. Contemporary pamphlets embodied much of his results and one of them contains the following, with which the reference to this subject may be concluded: 'Captain Walker, late commander of the Royal Family Privateers, in which station he behaved with uncommon Conduct and Bravery, is about taking a long lease of the Isle of Arran for himself and some other gentlemen in order to improve it for the Fishery; a most laudable example of true Patriotism, first boldly to wage war with the enemies of this country and then to employ the Reward of his Dangers and Toils in improving the same at home'

In October 1750, a Royal Charter was issued incorporating the Society of the Free British Fishery. Of this body the Prince of Wales was Governor, and the Council included many men of distinction. The project proved a failure, the reason for which is probably to be found in Walker's remark that he 'found Party contending for a majority in it, and Inexperience presiding at the board'. Capital of L104,000 was raised within eighteen months and in 1756 the Society possessed thirty vessels, the crews being drawn chiefly from Orkney. Financial and other difficulties were encountered, some of the vessels being taken by French privateers, and the remaining boats and other effects were sold in 1772 for L6,391.

== Bankrupted ==
On returning with their booty great numbers of sailors from the Royal Family were, at the alleged instigation of the owners, impressed for the navy and never received their prize money, which, instead of being divided in the stipulated manner, was deposited in the Bank of England and made subject to an order of the Court of Chancery. In 1749 some of the sailors filed a bill in Chancery, demanding an account, and in 1752 the Master of the Rolls made a decree in their favour. The owners, however, raised dilatory pleas, and the plaintiffs, through lack of means, were unable to pursue their claims with vigour. The hearings lasted till 1810, when on technical grounds the matter was dropped. Bad as the fate of the common men, the treatment of the Commodore, whose brains and bravery had provided this huge fortune for the owners, but was a child in regard to figures and finance, and the result was his mistreatment. The 21 May 1756 he was arrested for a debt of £800 at the suit of Belchier and Jalabert, two of the owners, and thrust into King's Bench Prison, where he remained for four years, the first twelve months in close confinement which ruined his health. In May, 1757, he was made a bankrupt.

== Later life and legacy ==
Walker afterwards commanded a ship in the fishing trade and had at least one good friend at his back, Hugh Baillie. In 1763 Walker arrived in Nova Scotia to start a new life as a man of business. Together, he and Baillie opened the Nepisiguit River fishery at Alston Point in 1766, or 1768, and brought out a fortune in fish and fur over the next decade. It is said Walker was the first English settler on that shore of the Baie des Chaleurs. After building store-houses and stages for the fishery, Walker returned to England, where he learned that land he had improved had just been given out as a grant, to a Captain Allen. He and Baillie purchased the grant for £600. He seems to have been appointed a magistrate at Alston Point by 1769. In 1773 all of Baillie's rights were bought out by John Schoolbred of London, and the settlement continued to grow, so that in 1775 Walker was resident there in charge of a well-equipped establishment, employing twenty British subjects, engaged in fishing, trading, shipbuilding, lumbering and, to some extent, farming. Then, in 1776, the establishment at Alston Point was destroyed by American privateers. He returned to England after this, and was appointed to a subordinate command under the Admiral on the North American station. When the expedition entrusted to his care was about to sail, it is said he died of apoplexy.

The 'Town and Country Magazine' for October, 1777, contains this notice of his death: - 'Sept. 20th, George Walker, Esquire, of Seething Lane, Tower St., formerly Commodore and Commander of the Royal Family private ships of war'; and an entry in the register of the church of All Hallows, Barking-by-the-Tower, attests his burial there on 24 September 1777.

Research has so far failed to throw any light on his parentage, birth, and boyhood. An article published in The Bristol Mirror suggests he may have been from Bristol. He has left an imperishable name as the greatest of the English privateer captains, a man singularly modest, conspicuously sincere, brave as a lion, untiring and fearless in the performance of his duty, and clever in all things but those affecting his own pocket.

About 1750, Charles Brooking painted "Commodore Walker's Action: the Privateer 'Boscawen' Engaging a Fleet of French Ships, 23 May 1745".
