= Jalbert =

Jalbert is a surname. Notable people with the surname include:

- David Jalbert (folk musician) (born 1980), Canadian folk musician and singer-songwriter
- David Jalbert (pianist) (born 1977), Canadian concert pianist and academic
- Domina Jalbert (1904–1991), invented the ram-air inflated flexible wing often called the "Jalbert parafoil"
- Dominic Jalbert (born 1989), Canadian ice hockey defenceman
- Jay Jalbert (born 1977), American lacrosse player
- Laurence Jalbert (born 1959), Canadian pop singer-songwriter
- Pierre Jalbert (1925–2014), Canadian skier, actor, and motion picture film and sound editor
- René Marc Jalbert (1921–1996), Canadian soldier and sergeant-at-arms of the National Assembly of Quebec
- Susanne E. Jalbert (born 1951), American social activist
- Franklin Jalbert, a fictional character from the 2024 novella Danny Coughlin's Bad Dream

== See also ==
- Val-Jalbert, ghost town in Quebec
- Matthieu Jalibert (born 1998), French rugby union player
- Jalabert
- Jaubert
- Joubert
- Gaubert
