= Pedro Messía de la Cerda, 5th Marquis of Vega de Armijo =

Spanish naval officer and colonial official

Pedro Messía de la Cerda
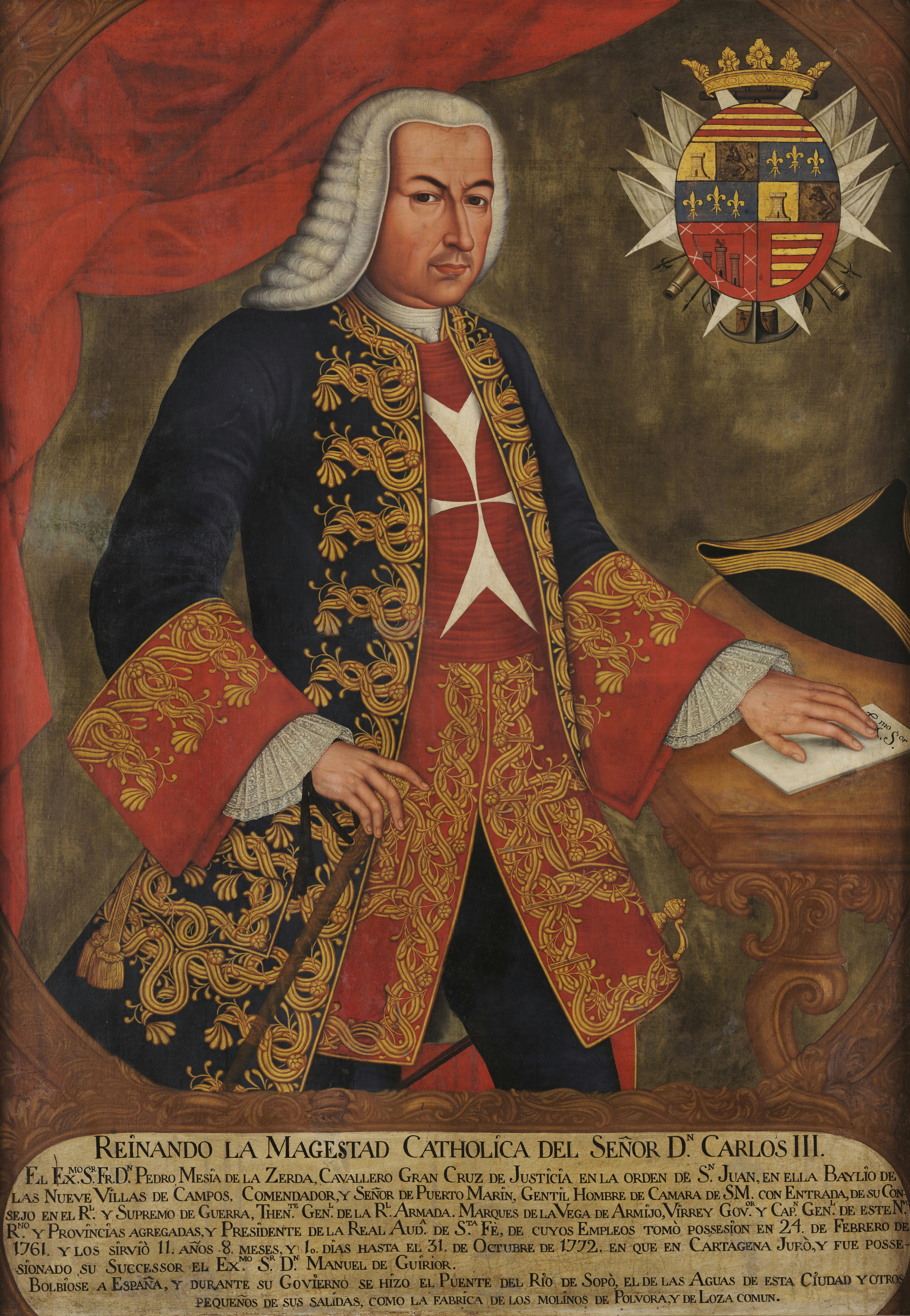
- Monarch: Charles III of Spain
- Monarch: Ferdinand VI of Spain

Personal details
- Born: February 16, 1700 Córdoba, Spain
- Died: April 15, 1783 (aged 83) Madrid, Spain
- Occupation: Spanish naval officer and colonial official.

Military service
- Rank: Lieutenant general of the navy
- Unit: Spanish Royal Navy
- Battles/wars: War of the Quadruple Alliance: The expedition of Sardinia; Battle of Cape Passaro; Battle of Cape St. Vincent; Spanish-Berber wars: The Oran Expedition; War of Jenkins' Ear: Voyage of the Glorioso

Pedro Messía de la Cerda, 5th Marquis of Vega de Armijo (February 16, 1700 in Córdoba, Spain – April 15, 1783 in Madrid) was a Spanish naval officer and colonial official. From 1761 to 1773 he was viceroy of New Granada (present-day Colombia, Venezuela, Panama and Ecuador).

== Background and early career ==
Pedro Messía de la Cerda was a knight of the Order of Malta, gentleman of the king's bedchamber, and knight commander of the Golden Key. He entered the navy, participating in the conquest of Sardinia and the reconquest of Sicily. In 1719 he took part in the Battle of Cape St. Vincent against the British.

He made his first voyage to the Americas in 1720, and in 1721 he was involved in the suppression of smuggling in Cartagena and Portobelo. In 1726 he was promoted to lieutenant of a frigate, and in 1745 he was made captain.

In 1747 Pedro Messía was Captain of the ship of the line Glorioso, during the famous Voyage of the Glorioso or the battles of the Glorioso, three naval engagements fought during the War of Jenkins' Ear between the Spanish 70-gun ship of the line Glorioso and several British squadrons which tried to capture it. Glorioso, carrying four million Spanish dollars from the Americas, was able to repel two British attacks off the Azores and Cape Finisterre, successfully landing her cargo at the port of Corcubión, Spain.

Several days after unloading her cargo, while sailing to Cádiz for repairs Glorioso was attacked successively near Cape St Vincent by four British privateers and the ships of the line HMS Dartmouth and HMS Russell from Admiral John Byng's fleet on 7 and 8 October. Dartmouth blew up, killing most of her crew, but the 80-gun Russell eventually forced Glorioso to strike her colours. The British took her to Lisbon and then to Portsmouth, where she was auctioned off instead of being commissioned because of the extensive damage suffered during the last battle. De la Cerda and his men were taken to London as prisoners of war, but were considered heroes in Spain and gained the admiration of the British. Several British officers were court-martialed and expelled from the Royal Navy for their poor performance against the Glorioso.

In 1753 when he was in Cartagena de Indias in charge of a military force for the suppression of privateers and smugglers, he received and entertained the new viceroy, José Solís Folch de Cardona upon his arrival there. In 1755 he became lieutenant general of the navy, and two years later was named a member of the Supreme Council of War.

== As Viceroy of New Granada ==
In March 1760 Messía was named Viceroy of New Granada. He arrived at Cartagena in October to take up his office. Arriving with him was the physician and botanist José Celestino Mutis, later head of the royal botanical expedition that investigated the flora and fauna of the colony. Messía traveled to Bogotá at the end of February 1761, where he was received with due ceremony. He returned to Cartagena in September 1762, upon receiving news of the British siege of Havana. Then he returned to the capital in 1763.

On instructions from the Crown, he imposed a tax on tobacco. He also took steps to stimulate the mineral production in the colony. During his administration a gunpowder factory was established in the capital, and a saltpeter factory in Tunja. He reorganized the treasury, reinforced the fortifications of Cartagena, and promoted public works, such as the road from Bogotá to Caracas. He promoted higher education and established a postal monopoly. He also increased the tax on aguardiente. In May 1765 this led to a revolt in Quito.

He aided the governor of Darién in fighting back the invasions of the Guna people. He also carried out campaigns against the Chimila and Guajiro (Wayuu) Indians, who had not yet been subjected by the Spanish. These campaigns were not very successful. He also faced an Indian attack on the town of Coyaima, where the rebels killed some people, burned some buildings and forced the corregidor to flee. He restored order in Neiva in 1767 after another rebellion.

Messía promoted the missions, also without major results. He began the construction of the cathedral of Santa Marta. The first stone was laid on December 8, 1766.^{es:Catedral Basílica de Santa Marta}

He carried out the order of King Charles III to expel the Jesuits from New Granada (and all the other Spanish dominions), and he established a mechanism to administer the property confiscated from the Order. Messía de la Cerda was a friend of the Jesuits, and tried to mitigate the harshness of the expulsion order. Nevertheless, it was enforced on July 31, 1767. At the time there were 114 Jesuit priests, 57 students and 56 brothers in the colony. Many of the individuals expelled took up residence in Urbino, Italy, where a number of them, through their writings, supplied European scholars with more information about the Americas.

== Return to Spain ==
In 1771 the king approved his request to return to Spain, pending the arrival of his successor, Manuel de Guirior. On September 14, 1772, he left for Cartagena, and the following month turned over the office of viceroy to Guirior.

He lived ten years in Spain, dying there in 1783.

== See also ==
- Guajira rebellion, written about by Messia

Government offices
Preceded by José Solís Folch de Cardona	Viceroy of New Granada; 1761–1773	Succeeded by Manuel de Guirior
