= Jaubert =

Jaubert is a French surname of Germanic origin : Gaut- and -berht, first used as a given name.

Notable people with the surname include:

- Alain Jaubert (1940-2025), French journalist and TV producer and director
- François Jaubert de Passa (1785-1856), French engineer and politician
- George F. Jaubert, A Swiss citizen who in 1903 patented Oxylithe, a form of sodium peroxide or sodium dioxide: see rebreather
- Hervé Jaubert (1960), French Navy officer who later worked for Exomos in Dubai
- Hippolyte François Jaubert, (1798–1874) was a French politician and botanist
- Jacques Jaubert (born 1957), French archaeologist
- Maurice Jaubert (1900–1940), a French composer
- Mathys Jaubert (born 2005), a French racing driver
- Pierre Amédée Jaubert (1779–1847), French Orientalist and traveller
- Pierre Jaubert (1929–2017), French music industry executive and producer

== See also ==
- The French marine commando Jaubert
- Joubert
- Gaubert
- Jalbert
- Jalabert
- Matthieu Jalibert (born 1998), French rugby union player
