= Battle of Cape St. Vincent (1719) =

1719 battle of the War of the Quadruple Alliance

Battle of Cape St Vincent
- Part of the War of the Quadruple Alliance
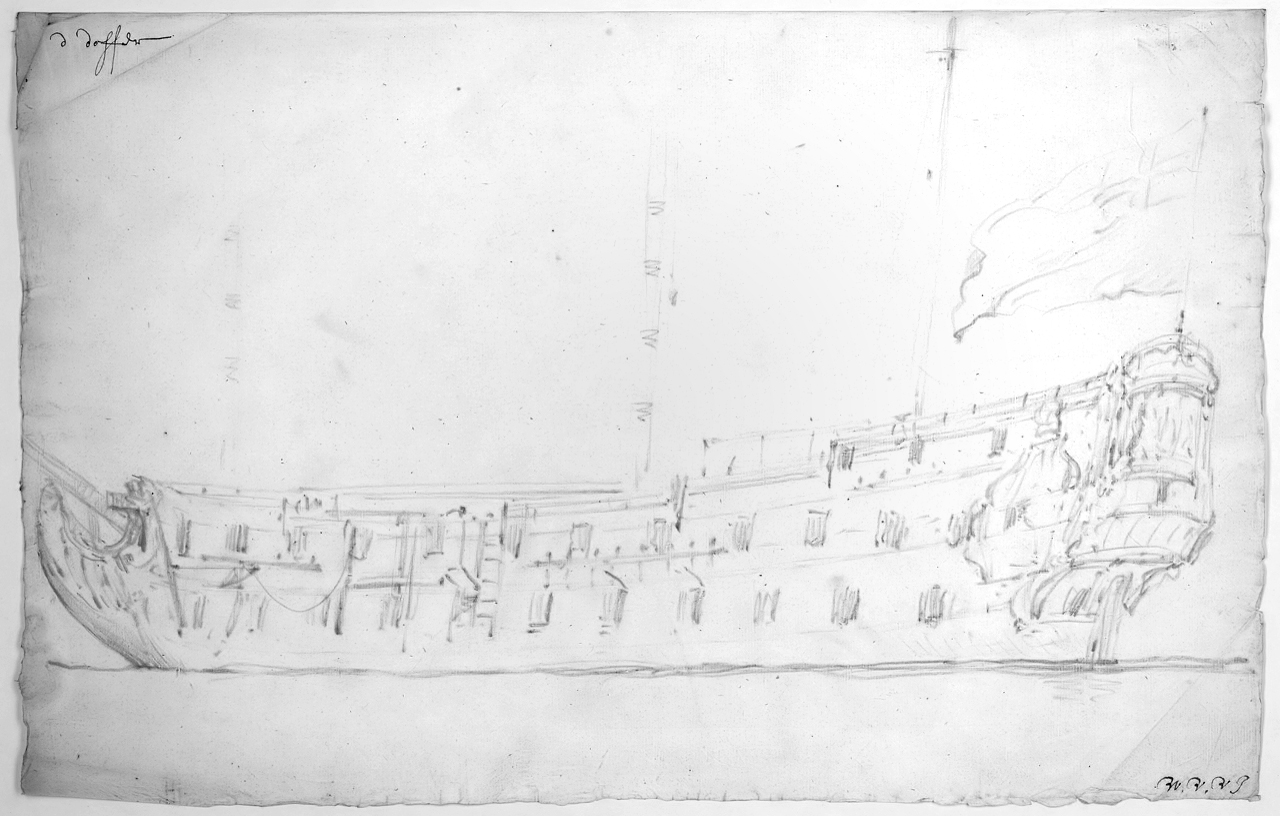
- HMS Dover, which fought in the battle
Date	20 December 1719
Location	Off Cape St. Vincent, Atlantic Ocean
Result	Spanish victory

Belligerents
Spain	Great Britain

Commanders and leaders
Rodrigo de Torres y Morales	Philip Cavendish

Strength
3 ships of the line	2 ships of the line 1 frigate

Casualties and losses
20 killed 27 wounded	40 killed or wounded

The Battle of Cape St Vincent was fought on 20 December 1719 as part of the War of the Quadruple Alliance. Occurring off Cape St. Vincent in the Atlantic Ocean, it was fought between a Royal Navy squadron of two ships of the line and a frigate under Commodore Philip Cavendish and a Spanish Navy squadron of three ships of the line under Rodrigo de Torres y Morales. The Spanish squadron has been sent from Santander to Cádiz to avoid being captured by British and French warships patrolling the Bay of Biscay.

Torres' squadron, which had captured a British frigate and sloop several days before the battle, forced Cavendish's squadron to withdraw to Gibraltar after five hours of combat; the Spanish arrived at Cádiz on 2 January 1720. The British suffered 40 killed or wounded while the Spanish lost 20 men killed and 27 wounded. Pedro Messía de la Cerda, who would come to fame commanding the voyage of the Glorioso during the War of the Austrian Succession, fought in the battle onboard one of the Spanish ships.

== Order of battle ==
- British squadron
  - HMS Norwich (50 guns)
  - HMS Advice (50 guns)
  - HMS Dover (40 guns)
- Spanish squadron
  - Conde de Tolosa (64 guns)
  - Nuestra Señora de Guadelupe (62 guns)
  - Hermione (50 guns)

== Bibliography ==
- Arsenal, León; Prado, Fernando (2008). Rincones de historia española. Madrid: EDAF. ISBN 978-84-414-2050-2.
- Charnock, John (1795). Biographia Navalis. Vol. 3. London: Naval & Military Press (republishing).
- Fernández Duro, Cesáreo (1898). Armada española desde la unión de los reinos de Castilla y de León. Vol. VI. Madrid: Est. tipográfico "Sucesores de Rivadeneyra".
