= Sir Tancred Robinson, 3rd Baronet =

Rear-Admiral Sir Tancred Robinson Bt
- Born: 1685
- Died: 2 September 1754 (aged 68–69)
- Buried: St Crux Church, York
- Allegiance: Kingdom of Great Britain
- Branch: Royal Navy
- Service years: –1741
- Rank: Rear-Admiral of the White
- Commands: HMS Solebay; HMS Gosport; HMS Deptford; HMS Winchester; HMS Dreadnought; HMS Kent; HMS Britannia
- Other work: Lord Mayor of York

Sir Tancred Robinson, 3rd Baronet (c. 1685 – 2 September 1754) was an English Rear-admiral and Lord Mayor of York.

== Life ==
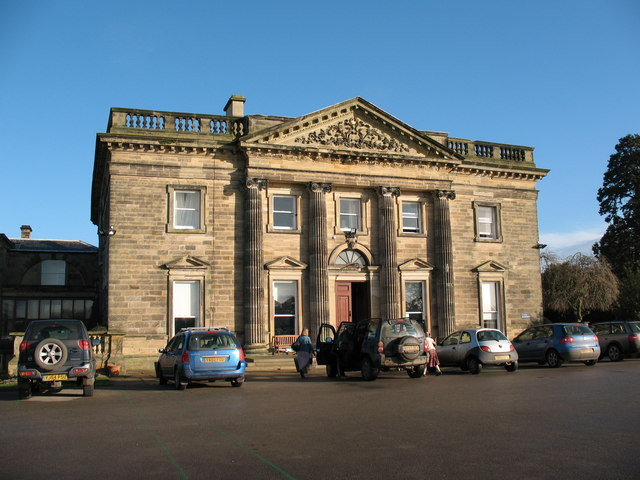
Newby Park

He was the second son of Sir William Robinson, 1st Baronet of Newby, Yorkshire and succeeded his elder brother Metcalfe to the baronetcy and Newby Park in 1741.

He joined the Royal Navy, was knighted and made commanding officer of HMS Solebay (1707) and Gosport (1708). After promotion to captain he successively commanded HMS Deptford (1710), Winchester (1712–14), Dreadnought (1716–18) and Britannia (1734–36). In 1736 he was made Rear-Admiral of the Blue Squadron and in 1739 Rear-Admiral of the White. He retired from the Navy in 1741.

Robinson was elected Lord Mayor of York in 1718 and again 1738. After his death in 1754, he was buried at the now demolished St Crux Church, York. Inside the church was a monument to his memory.

== Family ==
Robinson married Mary Norton, daughter of Rowland Norton of Dishforth, Yorkshire and had three sons (the eldest of whom predeceased him) and four daughters. He was succeeded by his eldest surviving son Sir William Robinson, 4th Baronet.

Baronetage of England
Preceded by Metcalfe Robinson	Baronet (of Newby); 1736–1754	Succeeded by William Robinson
