= HMS Dreadnought (1691) =

Ship of the line of the Royal Navy

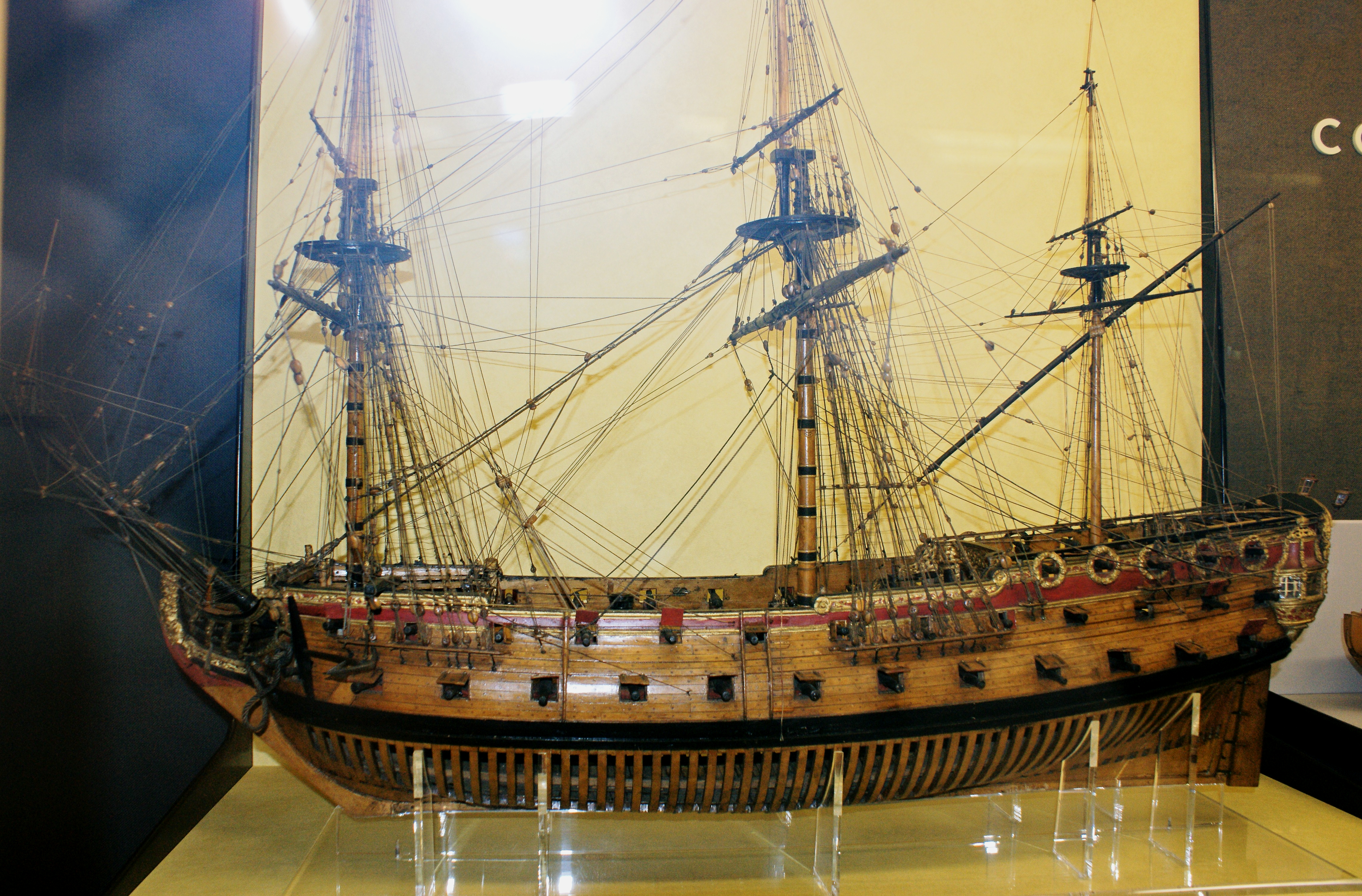

History

Great Britain
- Name: HMS Dreadnought
- Builder: Johnson, Blackwall Yard
- Launched: 1691
- Fate: Broken up, 1748

General characteristics as built
- Class & type: 64-gun third rate ship of the line
- Tons burthen: 852
- Length: 142 ft (43.3 m) (gundeck)
- Beam: 36 ft 5.5 in (11.1 m)
- Depth of hold: 17 ft 6 in (5.3 m)
- Propulsion: Sails
- Sail plan: Full-rigged ship
- Armament: 64 guns of various weights of shot

General characteristics after 1706 rebuild
- Class & type: 60-gun fourth rate ship of the line
- Tons burthen: 911
- Length: 142 ft 10.5 in (43.5 m) (gundeck)
- Beam: 38 ft 1 in (11.6 m)
- Depth of hold: 15 ft 9 in (4.8 m)
- Propulsion: Sails
- Sail plan: Full-rigged ship
- Armament: 60 guns of various weights of shot

HMS Dreadnought was a 64-gun third rate ship of the line of the Royal Navy, launched at Blackwall Yard in 1691. She was reduced to a fourth rate in 1697.

Dreadnought was rebuilt at Blackwall in 1706 as a fourth rate of 60 guns. She was enlarged in 1722, and converted into a hulk in 1740. She continued to serve in this role until 1748, when she was broken up.

She was captained from 1716 to 1718 by Sir Tancred Robinson.
