= French frigate Médée (1741) =

Frigate of the French Navy

- Boscawen (centre-right) engaging several French ships on 23 May 1745

History

Kingdom of France
- Name: Médée
- Laid down: September 1740
- Launched: February 1741
- Captured: 4 April 1744

Great Britain
- Name: HMS Medea
- Acquired: 4 April 1744
- Fate: Sold March 1745

Great Britain
- Name: Boscawen
- In service: 1744
- Out of service: November 1745
- Fate: Wrecked at St Ives, Cornwall
- Notes: Privateer

General characteristics
- Displacement: 840 tonneaux
- Tons burthen: 380 port tonneaux
- Length: 122 ft 0.3 in (37.2 m) (gundeck); 104 ft 5.3 in (31.8 m) (keel)
- Beam: 32 ft 6 in (9.9 m)
- Depth of hold: 15 ft 3.3 in (4.7 m)
- Complement: 240
- Armament: 26 × 8-pounder guns on one deck (Note: The French 'pound' (livre) was 7.9% heavier than the British pound, so 8 livres equals 8.63 British pounds.)

Médée was a 26-gun frigate of the French Navy launched in 1741. She is widely considered to be the inspiration for a long line of similar sailing frigates, and was the first ship captured by the Royal Navy in the War of the Austrian Succession. She became the British privateer Boscawen and was wrecked at St Ives, Cornwall, following a succession of gales in November 1745.

== Construction ==
Médée was designed by Blaise Ollivier, with twenty-six 8-pounder guns, and was launched in February 1741 at Brest. She was regarded as the first of the 'true' frigate designs: she was built with two decks, but only the upper deck mounted guns. These guns were relatively heavy, and the higher mounting meant that they could be used in rough seas.

== Capture and final voyage ==
Médée was captured in the English Channel by HMS Dreadnought on 4 April 1744 (Julian calendar date) and briefly served as HMS Medea in the British Royal Navy. She was sold in March 1745, becoming the privateer Boscawen; named after Edward Boscawen, the captain of Dreadnought. Although the Navy Board had the opportunity to purchase her, they decided not to retain her, in spite of her innovative design qualities; many French ships of the time were not designed for durability and she was not as strongly built as British frigates of that time.

Despite this the number of guns she carried was increased, and when Boscawen encountered a series of gales after leaving the Azores on 5 October 1745, she sprung several leaks. She was further weakened when, through negligence, the mainyard parted and dropped onto the ship, straining the already weakened hull. In response to a near-mutinous crew, Commodore George Walker set a course for the Lizard and having been swept northwards she was a floating wreck when Land's End was sighted on 24 November. The ship finally hove to in St Ives Bay on the north Cornish coast. Her anchors had been ditched days before and she broke in two on rocks at St Ives with the townsfolk wading into the sea to save the crew. Only four crew were lost, Commodore Walker being the last man to leave the wreck.

Her speed and size provided the Bedford Board of British Admiralty with the arguments needed to change the Royal Navy's frigate designs.
