= Joubert =

Joubert is a French surname. It is a regional variant form of Jaubert, originating in the centre west and centre south of France. This surname is common in South Africa and Namibia, particularly among the descendants of Huguenot settlers.

It may refer to:

== Persons ==
=== Military ===
- Barthelemy Catherine Joubert (1769–1799), French general during the French Revolutionary Wars
- Christiaan Johannes Joubert (1834–1911), South African soldier, politician and vice president of the South African Republic
- David Joubert, South African general, nephew of Petrus Jacobus "Piet" Joubert
- Léopold Louis Joubert (1842–1927), French soldier and lay missionary in the Belgian Congo
- Piet Joubert (1831–1900), South African commandant-general (equivalent to major general) and vice president of the South African Republic
- Philip Joubert de la Ferté, British air marshal

=== Music ===
- John Joubert (composer) (1927–2019), British composer
- The Joubert Singers, choir, notable for "Stand on the Word"
- Phyliss McKoy-Joubert, composer, most notably for "Stand on the Word"
- Gwynneth Joubert, South African singer-songwriter, known by her stage name as Gwynneth Ashley-Robin, most notably for Little Jimmy and Little Soldier Blue

=== Sports ===
- André Joubert (born 1964), South African rugby union player
- Antoine Joubert (born 1965), American basketball player and coach
- Brian Joubert (born 1984), French figure skater
- Craig Joubert (born 1977), South African rugby union referee
- Danie Joubert (1909–1997), South African sprinter
- Ernst Joubert (born 1980), South African rugby union player
- Marius Joubert (born 1979), South African rugby union player

=== Others ===
- Elsa Joubert (1922–2020), South African writer in Afrikaans
- Gideon Joubert (1923–2010), South African author and journalist
- Jacqueline Joubert (1921–2005), French television presenter
- John Joubert (serial killer) (1963–1996), American serial killer
- Joseph Joubert (1754–1824), French moralist and essayist
- Laurent Joubert (1529–1582), French physician
- Marie Joubert, Canadian neurologist who first identified Joubert syndrome
- Pierre Joubert (illustrator) (1910–2002), French illustrator
- Pierre Joubert (viticulturalist), (1664–1732)

== Fictional characters ==
- Joubert, in Sydney Pollack's film Three Days of the Condor (1975), played by Max von Sydow
- Marguerite (Minou) Reydon-Joubert (née Joubert), hero of both Kate Mosse' historical novels in 'The Burning Chambers' series, 'The Burning Chambers' and 'The City of Tears'

== See also ==
- General Joubert (disambiguation)
