= Capture of Eilean Donan Castle =

Capture of a castle as part of the Jacobite rising of 1719, in Scotland

- Part of the Jacobite rising of 1719
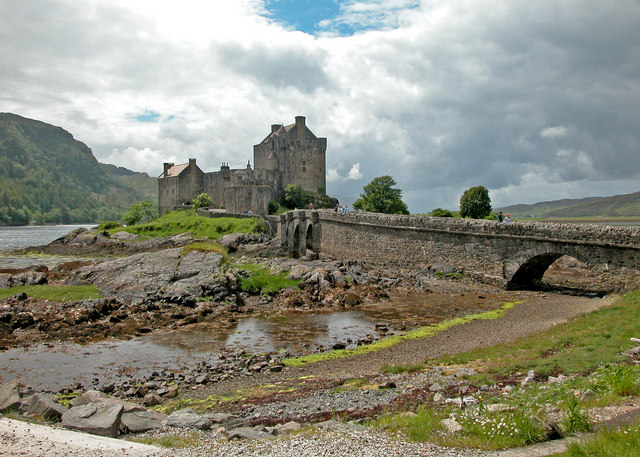
- Eilean Donan Castle
| Date | 10 May 1719 |
| Location | Eilean Donan, Scotland, Great Britain 57°16′26.50″N 05°30′58″W |
| Result | Government victory |

Belligerents
| (Kingdom of Great Britain) British Government | Jacobites; Spain |

Commanders and leaders
| Chester Boyle | Unknown |

Strength
| 1 ship of the line 2 frigates | 50 |

Casualties and losses
| 12 killed and wounded | 7 killed and wounded 43 captured |
- Location within Scotland

The Capture of Eilean Donan Castle was a land-based naval engagement that took place in 1719 during the British Jacobite rising of that year, and the War of the Quadruple Alliance. A British naval reconnaissance force of three ships attacked the castle of Eilean Donan on the west coast of Scotland, which was held by Spanish troops. After a naval bombardment, the British government forces stormed the castle, and the defenders surrendered. The castle was subsequently destroyed with gunpowder.

== Background ==
The capture of Eilean Donan was a military action of the 1719 Jacobite Rising, a Spanish-backed attempt to restore James Stuart to the throne of Great Britain. It was led by British Jacobite exiles George Keith, 10th Earl Marischal, the Marquess of Tullibardine and the Earl of Seaforth, chief of Clan Mackenzie.

On 11 April 1719, the British Jacobites landed near Loch Alsh with 300 Spanish marines and set up base in Eilean Donan; this was Mackenzie territory and selected to maximise potential recruits. Although 500 Mackenzies joined Seaforth, the British Jacobites had more arms and ammunition than they could use, they therefore stored the surplus in Eilean Donan with a garrison of 40-50 Spanish marines while the main force of about 1,000 marched on Inverness.

At the beginning of May, the Royal Navy sent five ships to the area for reconnaissance: two patrolling off Skye and three around Loch Alsh, adjacent to Loch Duich. Early in the morning on Sunday 10 May, these latter three, the fifty-gun HMS Worcester, the forty-four-gun HMS Enterprise, the twenty-gun HMS Flamborough, anchored off Eilean Donan on the north side of Loch Duich.

== Assault ==
Their first move was to send a boat ashore under a flag of truce to negotiate, but when the Spanish soldiers in the castle fired at the boat, it was recalled and all three ships opened fire on the castle for an hour or more. They then shifted anchorage and waited, the wind blowing a fresh gale.

The next morning (11 May), acting on intelligence from a Spanish deserter, the commanding officer, Captain Chester Boyle of the Worcester, sent the Enterprise up the loch to capture a house being used to store gunpowder but, according to the naval logs, the rebels on the shore set fire to the house as the ship approached. Meanwhile, the other two ships continued to bombard the castle at intervals while they prepared a landing party.

In the evening, under the cover of an intense cannonade, the ships' boats went ashore surrounding the castle on all sides and after scaling the walls captured the place against little resistance. The government forces had captured "an Irishman, a captain, a Spanish lieutenant, a sergeant, one Scots rebel and thirty-nine Spanish soldiers, 343 barrels of powder and 52 barrels of musquet shot".

== Aftermath ==
The Government troops then "burnt several barns etc where they had a quantity of corn for the use of their camp". The naval force spent the next two days demolishing the castle (it took twenty-seven barrels of gunpowder). The Spanish prisoners were put on board Flamborough and taken away to Leith and then Edinburgh.

The rising ended with the defeat of the Jacobites with the remaining Spanish troops on 10 June at the Battle of Glen Shiel.

Eilean Donan would stand in ruins for over 200 years until 1919 when it was rebuilt, restored and finished in 1932 by John MacRae-Gilstrap.

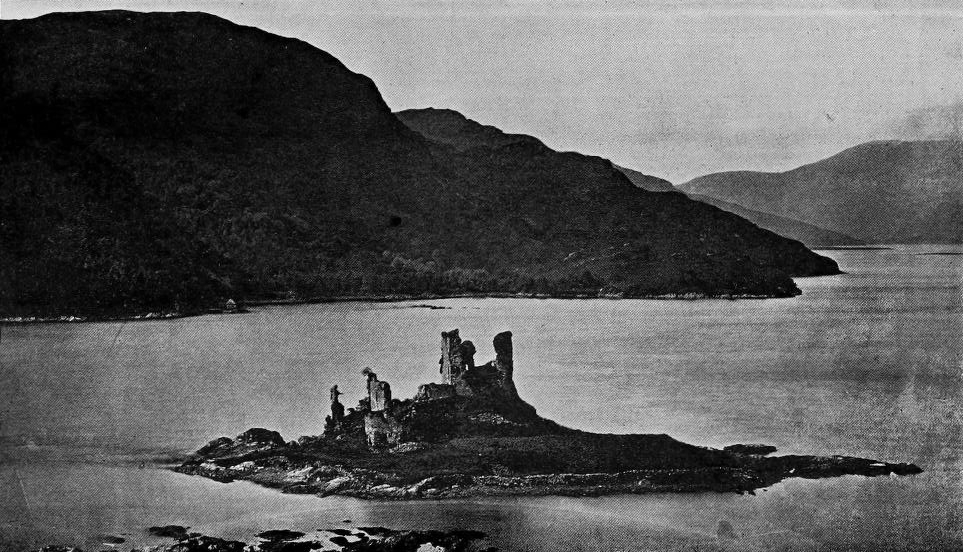
The ruins of the castle in the 19th century

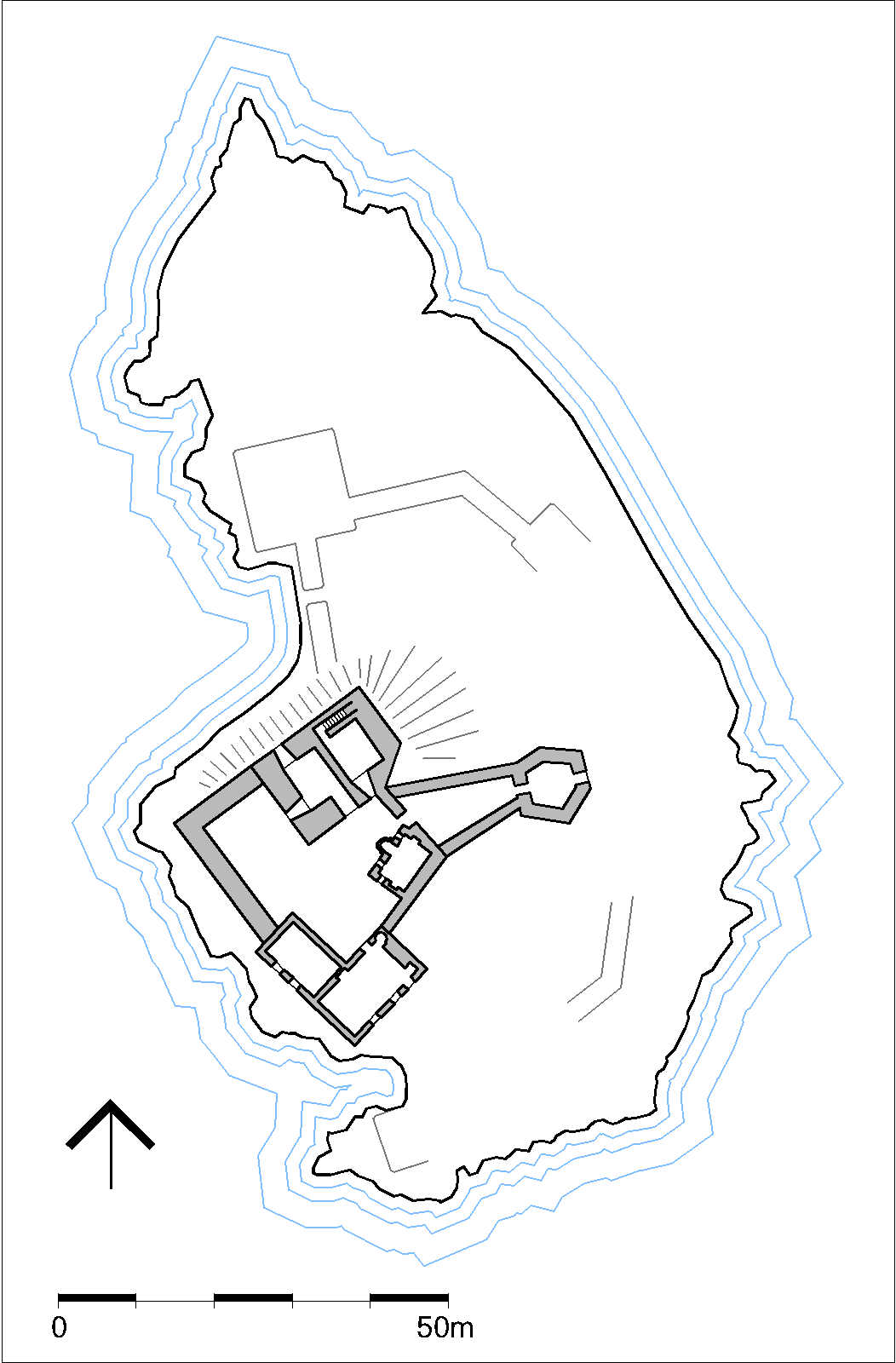
Plan of the castle at the time of the capture
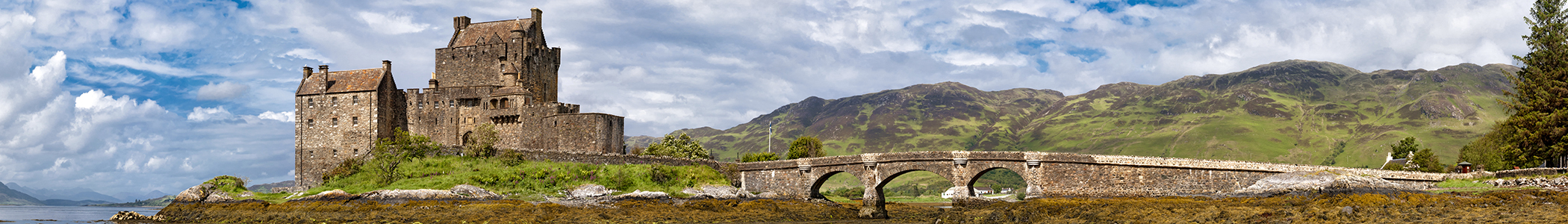
Panorama of the restored castle and Loch Duich .

== See also ==
- James Francis Edward Stuart
- Capture of Vigo
- Battle of Glen Shiel
