= Voyage of the Glorioso =

1747 naval battles of the War of Jenkins' Ear

- Part of the War of Jenkins' Ear
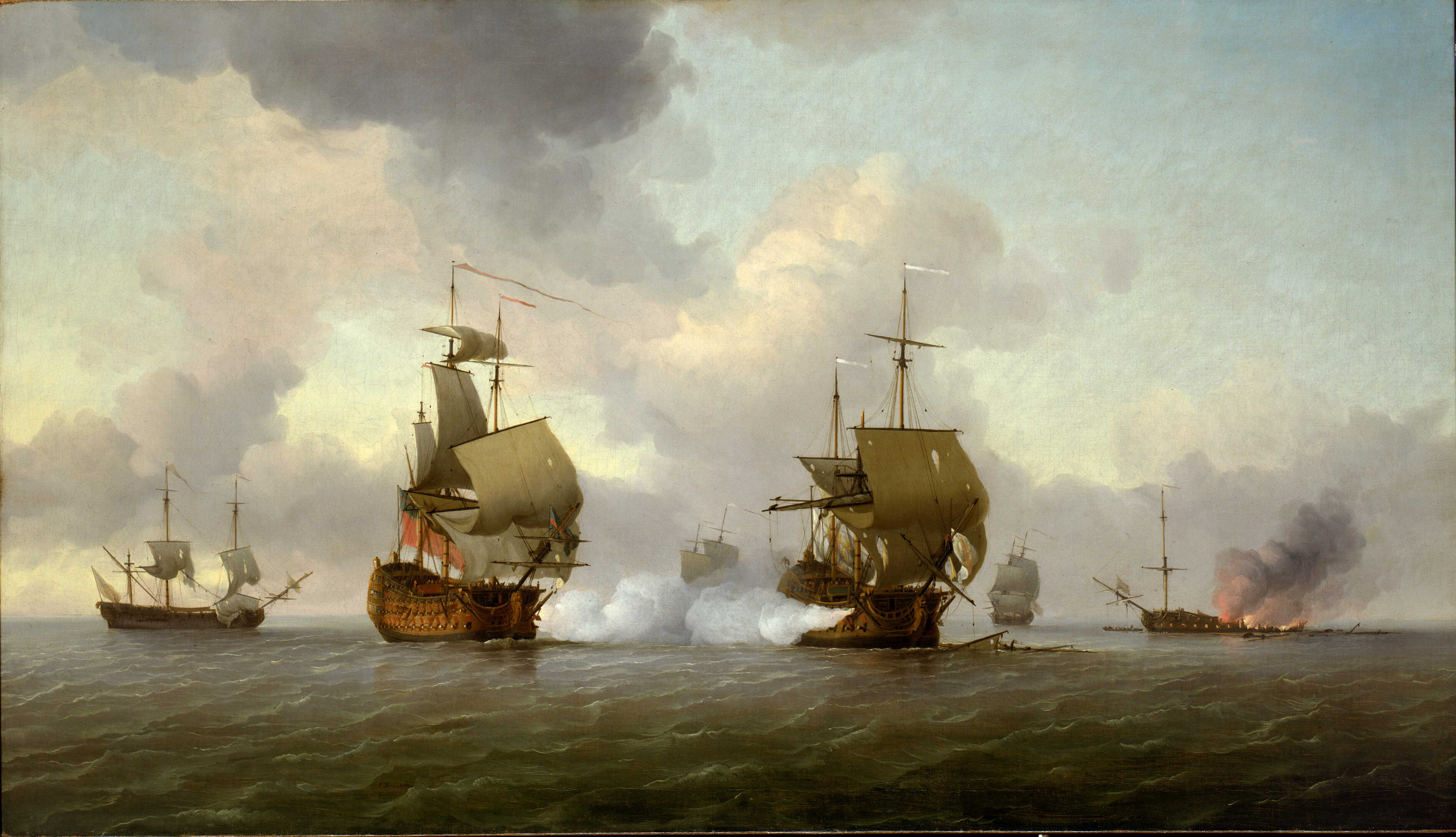
- The Capture of the 'Glorioso', 8 October 1747; Charles Brooking, c. 1747
| Date | 25 July – 8 October 1747 |
| Location | Atlantic Ocean |
| Result | See Aftermath |

Belligerents
| Great Britain | Spain |

Commanders and leaders
| John Crookshanks; Matthew Buckle; James Hamilton †; George Walker | Pedro Messia de la Cerda |

Strength
| 4 ships of the line 2 frigates 2 brigs 4 privateers | 1 ship of the line |

Casualties and losses
| First battle: 4 killed 20 wounded Third battle: 296–334 killed 1 ship of the line destroyed | First battle: 5 killed 44 wounded Third battle: 33 killed 130 wounded 1 ship of the line captured |

The voyage of the Glorioso involved three naval engagements fought in 1747 during the War of Jenkins' Ear between the 70-gun Spanish ship of the line Glorioso and several British squadrons which tried to capture it. Glorioso, carrying four million Spanish dollars from the Spanish Main, repelled two British attacks off the Azores and Cape Finisterre, landing her cargo at the port of Corcubión in Spain.

Several days after unloading the cargo, while sailing to Cádiz for repairs, Glorioso was attacked successively near Cape St Vincent by four British privateers and the Royal Navy ships of the line HMS Dartmouth and HMS Russell from Admiral John Byng's fleet. The 50-gun Dartmouth was repeatedly hit and blew up, killing most of her crew, but the 80-gun Russell eventually forced the Glorioso to strike her colours.

The British took Glorioso to Lisbon, where Portuguese authorities made an unsuccessful attempt to purchase her; the ship's British prize crew then took her to Portsmouth. The captain of Glorioso, Pedro Messia de la Cerda, was taken along with his men to England as prisoners of war. Despite being defeated, they were considered heroes in Spain and gained the admiration of the British due to the intensity of their resistance against a vastly superior force. Two British captains were court-martialed for their poor performance against Glorioso, with one being dismissed from the Royal Navy.

== Voyage ==
=== First battle ===
In July 1747, the 70-gun Spanish Navy ship of the line Glorioso, launched at Havana in 1739 and commissioned in 1740, was returning to Spain from the Spanish Main, under the command of Captain Pedro Messia de la Cerda and carrying a large shipment of about four million Spanish dollars. On 25 July, off Flores Island, one of the Azores, a British convoy was sighted through the fog. At noon, the fog began to dissipate and de la Cerda found that there were ten British ships, three of which were warships: the 60-gun ship of the line Warwick, the 44-gun frigate Lark, and a 20-gun brig. The remaining seven ships of the convoy were merchantmen.

De la Cerda tried to avoid combat, keeping to windward. The British convoy began to pursue the Spanish ship, and at 9:00 p.m., the brig caught up with Glorioso and there was an ineffectual exchange of fire between the two. At 2:00 p.m. there was a squall that took the wind from Glorioso and allowed the other British ships to come up. John Crookshanks, commanding officer of the convoy's escort, sent the brig to protect the merchantmen and ordered Lark to attack Glorioso. However, heavy gunfire from Glorioso severely damaged Lark's hull and rigging. Warwick then arrived and began to engage Glorioso, only to be dismasted and forced to withdraw.

Glorioso was hit by four cannonballs in her hull, along with suffering damage to her rigging. She suffered five men killed (two of whom were civilian passengers) and 44 wounded in the engagement. HMS Warwick had only four seamen killed and 20 wounded. When the British Admiralty was notified about this engagement, Crookshanks was court-martialled for denial of help and negligence in combat. Declared guilty for the defeat, he was dismissed from the Royal Navy, although he was allowed to retain his rank.

=== Second battle ===
After the engagement, Glorioso continued sailing to Spain, as her damage needed to be repaired in a port. She subsequently encountered three British warships from Admiral John Byng's fleet cruising off Cape Finisterre on 15 August, the 50-gun ship of the line HMS Oxford, 24-gun frigate HMS Shoreham and 20-gun brig HMS Falcon. After three hours of fighting, all three ships had suffered heavy damage and were forced to withdraw. Captain Callis of HMS Oxford was later court-martialed, but was honourably acquitted. Glorioso lost her bowsprit and sustained several casualties, but on the next day she finally entered the port of Corcubión in Galicia and unloaded her cargo.

=== Third battle ===
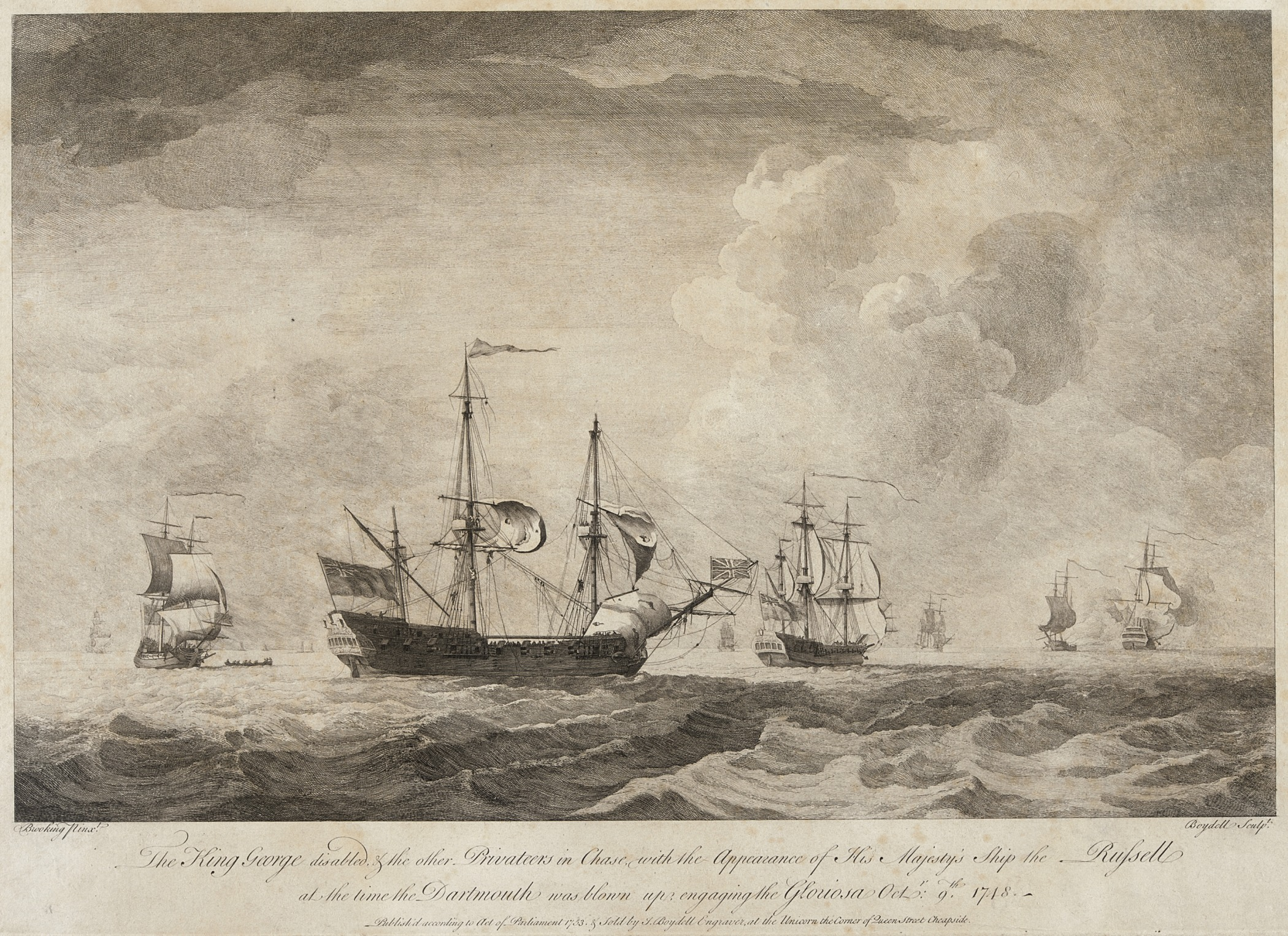
The King George disabled at the time the Dartmouth was blown up

In Corcubión, Glorioso's crew carried out repairs to the ship. After that, de la Cerda decided to head to Ferrol, Spain, but unfavourable winds damaged Glorioso's rigging and the ship was forced instead to make for Cádiz. She initially sailed away from the Portuguese coast to avoid further clashes with British ships. However, on 7 October, she encountered four British privateers under Commodore George Walker near Cape Saint Vincent. The privateers, known as the "Royal Family" due to the names of their vessels, consisted of the ships King George, Prince Frederick, Princess Amelia and Duke, altogether carrying 960 men and mounting 120 guns.

At 8 a.m., King George, the flagship of the Royal Family, approached the Glorioso and the two ships exchanged fire for three hours, with the King George losing her mainmast and two guns from Glorioso's first salvo. Glorioso continued sailing to southwards, being pursued by Prince Frederick, Princess Amelia and Duke.

=== Fourth battle ===
On 8 October, the three privateers were reinforced by two British ships of the line, the 50-gun HMS Dartmouth under Captain James Hamilton and the 80-gun HMS Russell under Captain Matthew Buckle, bringing the strength of the pursuers to over 250 guns and thousands of men.

The captain of Dartmouth, James Hamilton, placed his ship next to the Glorioso; nevertheless, after a fierce exchange of fire, Dartmouth's powder magazine caught fire and blew up at 3:30 p.m. Hamilton and most of his crew perished in the flames. Only a lieutenant, Christopher O'Brien, and 11 sailors survived the explosion. Some sources mention 14 survivors from a crew of 300. According to one survivor, HMS Dartmouth was already dismasted and heavily damaged by the Spanish gunfire when a round from Glorioso hit the light-room of the magazine, starting a fire that ignited the powder and blew the ship up. He claimed 15 members of her crew were rescued out of a total complement of 325. These men were saved by life boats from Prince Frederick.

=== Fifth battle ===
The three privateers joined Russell on the following evening and together attacked the Glorioso with all their guns. The Spanish ship resisted from midnight to 9 a.m., when about to sink, almost completely dismasted, without ammunition, and with 33 men killed and 130 wounded on board, de la Cerda, seeing that further resistance was impossible, struck the colours. Russell had 12 killed and several wounded. Another eight men died aboard King George.

== Aftermath ==
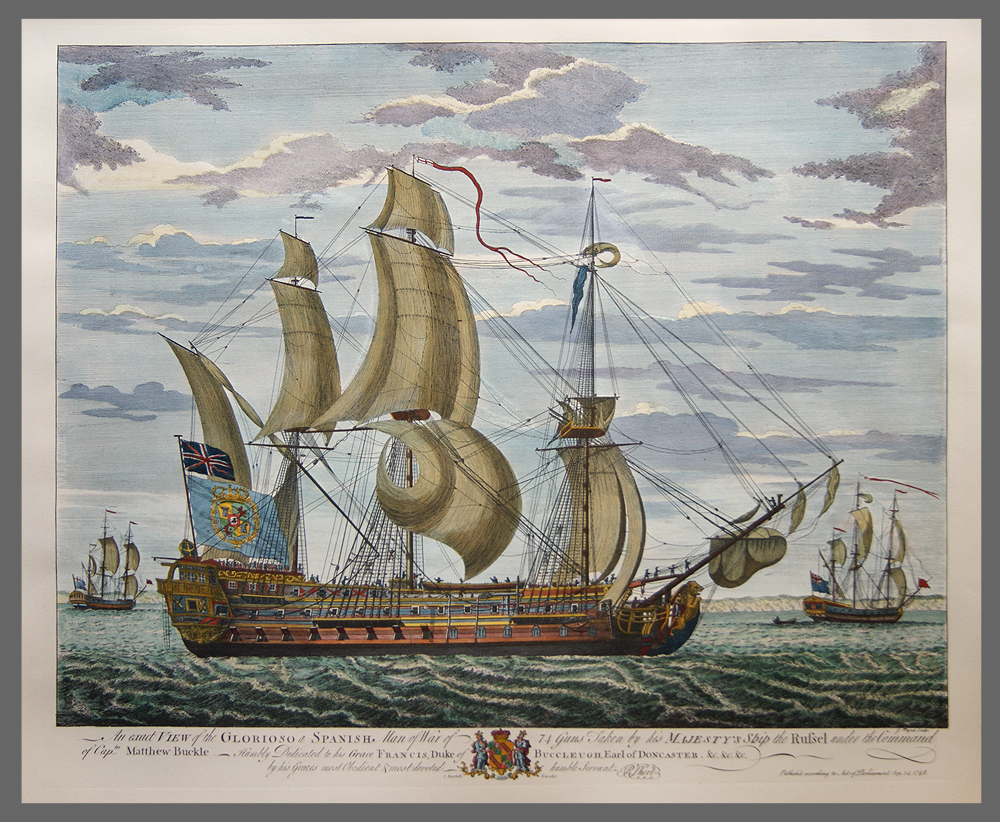
British engraving of Glorioso after she was captured

After the last battle the British ships sailed to Lisbon, taking the Glorioso with them. The Spanish ship of the line was surveyed, but not taken into the Royal Navy, and instead was broken up due to the heavy damage she had sustained. Walker was severely reprimanded by one of the owners of the Royal Family for risking his ship against a superior force. Walker, dissenting, responded:

Had the treasure been aboard the Glorioso, as I expected, my dear sir, your compliment would have been far different. Or had we let her escape from us with the treasure aboard, what would you have said then?

— Commodore George Walker, Lisbon, October, 1747

De la Cerda and his men, who had been taken on board Prince Frederick and King George, were brought to England and imprisoned in London, where they became the subject of the admiration of the British. De la Cerda was later promoted to commodore for his performance in combat and the surviving crew received rewards on their return to Spain. According to historian Joseph Allen, the defence of the Glorioso ranks foremost in Spanish naval history.

== See also ==
- Spanish treasure fleet

== Bibliography ==
- Allen, Joseph (1852). Battles of the British Navy, Volume 1. London: Henry G. Bohn.
- Beatson, Robert (1804). Naval and military memoirs of Great Britain, from 1727 to 1783, Volume 1. Longman, Hurst, Rees and Orme.
- Fernández Duro, Cesáreo (1898). Armada española desde la unión de los reinos de Castilla y de León, tomo VI. Madrid: Est. tipográfico "Sucesores de Rivadeneyra". (in Spanish)
- Johnston, Charles H. L. (2004). Famous Privateersmen and Adventures of the Sea. Kessinger Publishing. ISBN 978-1-4179-2666-4.
- Keppel, Thomas Robert (1842). The life of Augustus, viscount Keppel, admiral of the White, and first Lord of the Admiralty in 1782-3, Volume 1. London: H. Colburn.
- Laughton, John Knox. Armada Studies in Naval History. Biographies. Adamant Media Corporation. ISBN 978-1-4021-8125-2.
- Schomberg, Isaac (1815). Naval chronology: or An historical summary of naval and maritime events... From the time of the Romans, to the treaty of peace of Amiens..., Volume 1. London: T. Egerton by C. Roworth.
- Walker, George (1760). The Voyages And Cruises Of Commodore Walker: During the late Spanish and French Wars. In Two Volumes. London: Millar.
