= HMS Tilbury (1699) =

Ship of the line of the Royal Navy

History

Great Britain
- Name: HMS Tilbury
- Ordered: 24 December 1695
- Builder: Daniel Furzer, Chatham Dockyard
- Launched: 3 September 1699
- Fate: Broken up, 1726

General characteristics
- Class & type: 50-gun fourth rate ship of the line
- Tons burthen: 691 26/94 bm
- Length: 130 ft 1.5 in (39.7 m) (gundeck) 110 ft 3 in (33.6 m) (keel)
- Beam: 34 ft 4 in (10.5 m)
- Depth of hold: 13 ft 7.5 in (4.2 m)
- Propulsion: Sails
- Sail plan: Full-rigged ship
- Armament: 50 guns of various weights of shot

HMS Tilbury was a 50-gun fourth rate ship of the line of the Royal Navy, one of eight such ships authorised by the Navy Board on 24 December 1695 to be newly built (six by commercial contract and two in the Royal Dockyards); the others were the Hampshire, Dartmouth, Winchester, Salisbury, Worcester, Jersey and Carlisle. Construction of the Tilbury was awarded to Chatham Dockyard, where she was designed and built by Master Shipwright Daniel Furzer, and she was launched there on 3 September 1699 - the last of the eight ships to be finished.

The Tilbury served until 1726, when she docked at Chatham Dockyard on 4 November and was broken up.
