= Belchier =

Belchier is a surname. Notable people with the surname include:

- Daubridgecourt Belchier (1580–1621), British dramatist
- John Belchier (1706–1785), British surgeon

== See also ==
- Belcher (surname)
- Belchier v Parsons
