= Action of 30 September 1681 =

Naval battle between the Spanish and Brandenburg navies

Coordinates: 37.0228°N 8.9909°W

Action of 31 September 1681
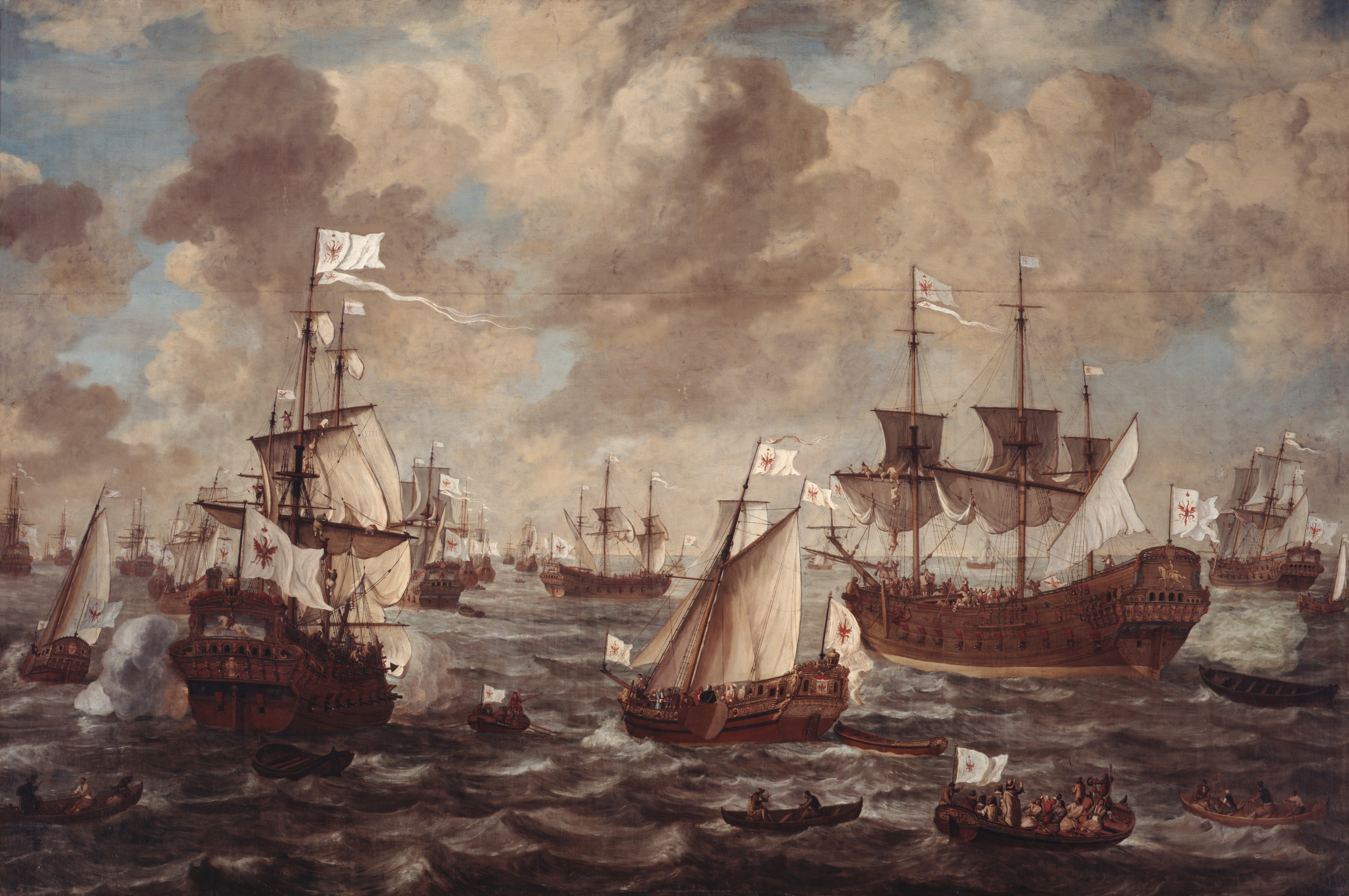
- 1684 painting of Brandenburg Navy warships
Date	30 September 1681
Location	Off Cape St. Vincent, Atlantic Ocean
Result	Spanish victory

Belligerents
Spain	Brandenburg-Prussia

Commanders and leaders
Marquess of Villafiel	Thomas Alders

Strength
12 galleons 3 fireships	6 ships

Casualties and losses
Unknown	10 killed c. 30 wounded

The action of 30 September 1681 was a 2-hour fight that took place on 30 September 1681 near Cape St Vincent, and was a victory for the Spanish over Brandenburg-Prussia, which suffered 10 dead and 30 wounded.

== Action ==
The Brandenburg squadron, mistakenly believing to have encountered a Spanish convoy of merchant ships returning fully laden with precious metals, spices, and luxuries from the Americas, attacked the far superior Spanish warship squadron that had been sent out in search of the suspected raiders, but retreated into the safety of the Portuguese port of Lagos when their mistake became clear. While the Branderburgers repaired their damage in Lagos, the Spanish merchant convoy safely slipped into Cádiz.

== Ships involved ==
=== Spain ===
- 12 ships
- 3 fireships

=== Brandenburg (Adlers) ===
- Markgraf von Brandenburg 50 guns (formerly Spanish Carolus Secundus, captured the previous year)
- Fuchs 20 guns
- Rother Löwe 20 guns
- Einhorn 12 guns
- Prinzess Maria 12 guns
- Wasserhund 10 guns

Total : 6 ships, 124 guns.
