= HMS Deptford (1687) =

Ship of the line of the Royal Navy

History

Great Britain
- Name: HMS Deptford
- Ordered: 15 September 1682
- Builder: Thomas Shish (until his death in December 1685), then Joseph Lawrence, Woolwich Dockyard
- Launched: June 1687
- Fate: Broken up 1726

General characteristics as built
- Class & type: 50-gun fourth-rate ship of the line
- Tons burthen: 615 bm
- Length: 125 ft (38.1 m) (on the gundeck), 103 ft (31.4 m) (keel)
- Beam: 33 ft 6 in (10.2 m)
- Depth of hold: 13 ft 11 in (4.2 m)
- Propulsion: Sails
- Sail plan: Full-rigged ship
- Armament: 50 guns of various weights of shot

General characteristics after 1700 rebuild
- Class & type: 46- to 54-gun fourth-rate ship of the line
- Tons burthen: 669 bm
- Length: 128 ft 4 in (39.1 m) (on gundeck), 106 ft 9 in (32.5 m) (keel)
- Beam: 34 ft 4 in (10.5 m)
- Depth of hold: 13 ft 5 in (4.1 m)
- Propulsion: Sails
- Sail plan: Full-rigged ship
- Armament: 46-54 guns of various weights of shot

General characteristics after 1719 rebuild
- Class & type: 1706 Establishment 50-gun fourth-rate ship of the line
- Tons burthen: 710 tons
- Length: 131 ft (39.9 m) (on the gundeck) 109 ft 6 in (33.4 m) (keel)
- Beam: 35 ft (10.7 m)
- Depth of hold: 14 ft (4.3 m)
- Propulsion: Sails
- Sail plan: Full-rigged ship
- Armament: 50 guns: Gundeck: 22 × 18-pdrs; Upper gundeck: 22 × 9-pdrs; Quarterdeck: 4 × 6-pdrs; Forecastle: 2 × 6-pdrs

HMS Deptford was a 50-gun fourth-rate ship of the line of the Royal Navy, launched at Woolwich Dockyard in 1687. This was the second of three 50-gun ships ordered in 1682/3.

== Armament ==
All three ships ordered in 1682/3 (all were launched in 1687) were intended to carry 54 guns each - twenty-two 24-pounders on the lower deck, the same number of demi-culverins (9-pounders) on the upper deck, and ten demi-culverin drakes on the quarterdeck. However, each was completed with just 50 guns in wartime service and 44 guns in peacetime.

== Rebuilding ==
She underwent her first rebuild at Woolwich in 1700 (having been ordered "to repair" on 7 June 1699) as a fourth rate of between 46 and 54 guns. Her second rebuild took place at Portsmouth Dockyard, where she was reconstructed as a 50-gun fourth rate to the 1706 Establishment from 1717 and relaunched on 19 June 1719. She was captained in 1710 by Sir Tancred Robinson.

Deptford was taken to pieces at Plymouth in 1726, and a replacement of the same name built (as a 60-gun ship) at Deptford Dockyard in 1729–1732.
