= HMS Solebay (1694) =

British warship

History

England
- Name: HMS Solebay
- Ordered: 1694
- Builder: Edward Snelgrove, Redhouse
- Launched: 13 September 1694
- Commissioned: 13 August 1694
- Fate: Wrecked 25 December 1709

General characteristics
- Type: 20-gun sixth rate
- Tons burthen: 253 6/94 bm
- Length: 93 ft 0 in (28.3 m) gundeck; 77 ft 8 in (23.7 m) keel for tonnage
- Beam: 24 ft 11 in (7.6 m) for tonnage
- Depth of hold: 10 ft 8 in (3.3 m)
- Armament: initially as ordered; 20 × sakers on wooden trucks (UD); 4 × 3-pdr on wooden trucks (QD); 1703 Establishment; 20 × 6-pdrs on wooden trucks (UD); 4 × 4-pdr on wooden trucks (QD)

HMS Solebay was a member of the standardised 20-gun sixth rates built at the end of the 17th century. After commissioning she spent her career mainly in the North Sea with a stint in the Irish sea. Mainly employed as a trade protection vessel. She was wrecked in 1709.

Solebay was the first so-named vessel in the Royal Navy.

== Construction ==
She was ordered in the Second Batch of eight ships to be built under contract by Edward Snelgrove of Redhouse. She was launched on 13 September 1694.

== Commissioned service ==
She was commissioned on 13 August 1694 under the command of Captain Robert Stevens, RN, for service in the North Sea. Captain Henry Wilde, RN, took command on 1 May 1695 for fishery protection in the North Sea. With Captain Henry Lawrence taking command from 25 May 1699 into 1700 she remained in the Irish Sea. Her assignment was changed to the North Sea under the following commanders: 1702 Captain John Alfred, RN; 1706 Commander Galfridus Walpole, RN; 1707 Commander Sir Tancred Robinson, RN; and 1708 Commander George Stidson, RN.

== Disposition ==
HMS Solebay was wrecked on Boston Knock sands, Lincolnshire, on 25 December 1709. (Note: ref Winfield states she was wrecked on Boston Knock sands whereas ref Colledge states she was wrecked on Boston Rock near Lyme Regis.)
