= General Joubert (disambiguation) =

General Joubert refers to Piet Joubert (1831–1900), Commandant-General of the South African Republic. General Joubert may also refer to:

- Barthélemy Catherine Joubert (1769–1799), French First Republic general
- Francois Gerhardus Joubert (1827–1903), Boer general

== See also ==
- Pierre Joseph Joubert de La Salette (1743–1833), French general of the Revolution and the Empire
