= HMS Winchester (1698) =

Ship of the line of the Royal Navy

History

Great Britain
- Name: HMS Winchester
- Ordered: 24 December 1695
- Builder: John & Richard Wells, Greenland North Dockyard, Rotherhithe
- Launched: 17 March 1698
- Fate: Broken up, 1781

General characteristics as built
- Class & type: 50-gun fourth rate ship of the line
- Tons burthen: 673 48/94 bm
- Length: 130 ft (39.6 m) (on gundeck) 107 ft 5 in (32.7 m) (keel)
- Beam: 34 ft 4 in (10.5 m)
- Depth of hold: 13 ft 7 in (4.1 m)
- Propulsion: Sails
- Sail plan: Full-rigged ship
- Armament: 50 guns of various weights of shot

General characteristics after 1717 rebuild
- Class & type: 1706 Establishment 50-gun fourth rate ship of the line
- Tons burthen: 710 34/94 bm
- Length: 131 ft 4 in (40.0 m) (gundeck) 108 ft 7 in (33.1 m) (keel)
- Beam: 35 ft 1 in (10.7 m)
- Depth of hold: 14 ft (4.3 m)
- Propulsion: Sails
- Sail plan: Full-rigged ship
- Armament: 50 guns: Gundeck: 22 × 18 pdrs; Upper gundeck: 22 × 9 pdrs; Quarterdeck: 4 × 6 pdrs; Forecastle: 2 × 6 pdrs

HMS Winchester was a 50-gun fourth rate ship of the line of the Royal Navy, one of eight such ships authorised by the Navy Board to be newly built (six by commercial contract and two in the Royal Dockyards); the others were the Hampshire, Dartmouth, Salisbury, Worcester, Jersey, Carlisle and Tilbury. The contract for the Winchester was signed with shipbuilders John and Richard Wells in 1696, for the ship to be built in their yard at Greenland North Dockyard, in Rotherhithe, and she was launched there on 17 March 1698.

She docked at Plymouth on 10 July 1716 to be rebuilt there by Master Shipwright John Phillips in accordance with the Navy Board instruction of 8 March 1716, to the 1706 Establishment, and was re-launched on 10 October 1717. The Winchester was hulked in 1744, and served in this role until 1781, when she was broken up at Chatham Dockyard.

She was captained from 1712 to 1714 by Sir Tancred Robinson.
