= HMS Salisbury (1698) =

Ship of the line of the Royal Navy

History

England
- Name: HMS Salisbury
- Ordered: 24 December 1695
- Builder: Richard and James Herring, Baileys Hard
- Launched: 18 April 1698
- Captured: By the French, 10 May 1703

France
- Acquired: 10 May 1703
- Captured: Captured by the British on 15 March 1708

Great Britain
- Name: HMS Salisbury Prize
- Acquired: 15 March 1708
- Renamed: HMS Preston on 2 January 1716
- Fate: Hulked in September 1748; Broken up in November 1749

General characteristics as built
- Class & type: 50-gun fourth rate ship of the line
- Tons burthen: 681 67/94 bm
- Length: 134 ft 4.5 in (41.0 m) (gundeck) 109 ft 9.5 in (33.5 m) (keel)
- Beam: 34 ft 2 in (10.4 m)
- Depth of hold: 13 ft 6 in (4.1 m)
- Propulsion: Sails
- Sail plan: Full-rigged ship
- Armament: 50 guns of various weights of shot

General characteristics after 1742 rebuild
- Class & type: 1733 proposals 50-gun fourth rate ship of the line
- Tons burthen: 859 60/94 bm
- Length: 134 ft 1 in (40.9 m) (gundeck) 108 ft 2 in (33.0 m) (keel)
- Beam: 38 ft 7 in (11.8 m)
- Depth of hold: 15 ft 9 in (4.8 m)
- Propulsion: Sails
- Sail plan: Full-rigged ship
- Armament: 50 guns: Gundeck: 22 × 18 pdrs; Upper gundeck: 22 × 9 pdrs; Quarterdeck: 4 × 6 pdrs; Forecastle: 2 × 6 pdrs

HMS Salisbury was a 50-gun fourth rate ship of the line of the Royal Navy, one of eight such ships authorised by the Navy Board on 24 December 1695 to be newly built (six by commercial contract and two in the Royal Dockyards); the others were the Hampshire, Dartmouth, Winchester, Worcester, Jersey, Carlisle and Tilbury. The contract for the Winchester was signed with shipbuilders Richard and James Herring in 1696, for the ship to be built in their yard at Baileys Hard (near Bucklers Hard) on the Beaulieu River in Hampshire, England, and she was launched there on 18 April 1698.

Salisbury was commissioned in 1699 under her first commander, Captain Richard Lestock. The following year she joined Admiral George Rooke's fleet in the Baltic, and remained with Rooke off Dunkirk in 1701. Lestock was succeeded by Captain Richard Cotton, but while off Orford Ness on 10 April 1703 she encountered and was attacked by a squadron consisting of four French warships, including the Adroit, and three privateers. After an engagement which left 17 killed and 34 wounded, Salisbury was taken by the French. She served with the French under the name Salisbury, and for a time was part of Claude de Forbin's squadron.

On 1 May 1707, Salisbury very nearly fell back into English hands.

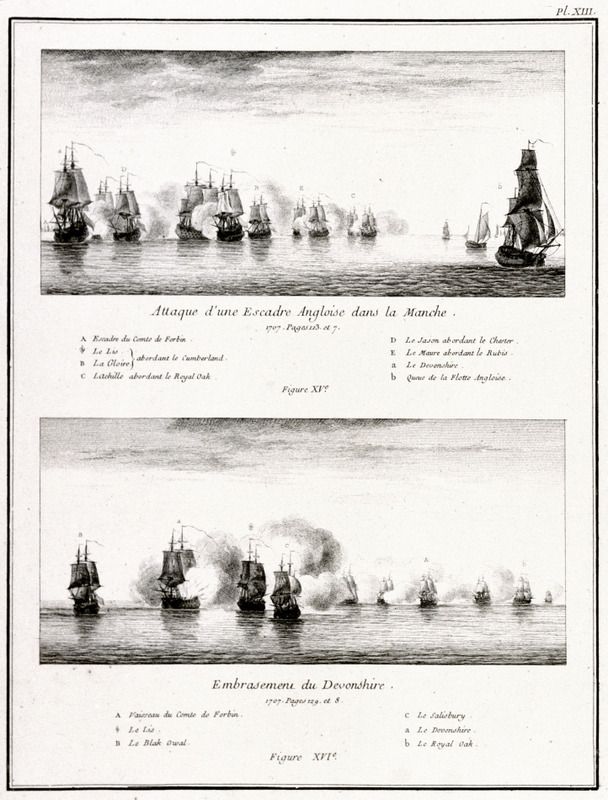
A print published in France shows the Le Salisbury during the Action of 2 May 1707 off Beachy Head

Salisbury was part of the Dunkirk Squadron that attacked the English convoy commanded by Baron Wylde, during the action of 2 May 1707. Captain George Clements lost his life in defence of HMS Hampton Court, but not before his crew so disabled Salisbury that she was left for a wreck, later recovered by the French who could not fit her out in time for their next warring exploit, but later commissioned her as Le Salisbury.

She was finally recaptured off Scotland on 15 March 1708 by HMS Leopard and other ships of Sir George Byng's squadron. She was first renamed HMS Salisbury Prize, as a new HMS Salisbury had already been built. She was renamed HMS Preston on 2 January 1716.

On 9 January 1739 Preston was ordered to be taken to pieces to be rebuilt by Master Shipwright Thomas Fellowes at Plymouth Dockyard according to the 1733 proposals of the 1719 Establishment, and she was broken up in February. In 1739 the Navy Board finally decided to dispense with the fictional concept of "rebuilding", and new instructions on 8 May 1739 were that a new ship should be built, and the keel for this new ship was laid down in December 1739; the Preston was launched on 18 September 1742. From 1745 she was assigned to the Royal Navy's East Indies squadron which was based in the Dutch-held port of Trincomalee, Ceylon. In September 1748 she was declared unseaworthy and converted into a hulk. Over the following year she served as a storehouse for naval supplies and a support for the careening of other vessels, and was broken up in November 1749.

== See also ==
- List of ships captured in the 18th century
