= HMS Hampshire (1698) =

Ship of the line of the Royal Navy

History

Great Britain
- Name: HMS Hampshire
- Ordered: 24 December 1695
- Builder: John Taylor, Nelson Dock, Rotherhithe
- Launched: 3 March 1698
- Commissioned: 1699
- In service: 1699–1734
- Out of service: 1734
- Fate: Broken up, 1739

General characteristics
- Class & type: 50-gun fourth rate ship of the line
- Tons burthen: 690 1/94 bm
- Length: 132 ft (40.2 m) (on gundeck) 110 ft 7 in (33.7 m) (keel)
- Beam: 34 ft 3 in (10.4 m)
- Depth of hold: 13 ft 8 in (4.2 m)
- Propulsion: Sails
- Sail plan: Full-rigged ship
- Armament: 54 guns in wartime (46 in peace): Lower gundeck 22 x 12 pdr guns; Upper gundeck 22 x 6 pdr guns; Quarterdeck 8 x 6 pdr guns; Forecastle 2 x 6pdr guns

HMS Hampshire was a 50-gun fourth rate ship of the line of the Royal Navy.

== Construction ==
Hampshire was one of eight ships authorised by the Navy Board on 24 December 1695 to be newly built for service in the Nine Years' War against France. (Note: The others in the group were Dartmouth, Winchester, Salisbury, Worcester, Jersey, Carlisle and Tilbury.) A contract for construction was signed with shipbuilder John Taylor on 14 February 1696, for the ship to be built in his yard at Nelson Dock in Cuckold's Point, South London. She was launched from there on 3 March 1698.

== Naval service ==
Hampshire's entry into active service was delayed by the Peace of Ryswick in October 1697, which ended the war with France. The vessel's first eighteen months were therefore spent in port at Rotherhithe. She was eventually commissioned under Captain Andrew Leake for service protecting Britain's fisheries fleet in Newfoundland in 1699, and then in the Baltic Sea in 1700.

At the conclusion of this uneventful service Hampshire was returned to England, making port at the Downs in February 1701. There, Leake discovered that the crew had written a round robin to Admiralty in which they accused him of ill-using them. Leake denounced the allegation, saying that he "always took care to do the sailors justice". He argued that the true motivation of Hampshire's crew was to avoid having to pay large bills they had accrued to their landladies ashore; if they proved Leake had been abusing them they could be turned over into another ship that would take them away before they were forced to pay what they owed. The Admiralty ultimately ruled in Leake's favour, with Hampshire's crew compelled to remain at their posts.

Hampshire was broken up at Portsmouth Dockyard in June 1739, with a replacement 50-gun ship of the same name being built at Ipswich in 1740–41.

== Bibliography ==
- Laughton, J. K.; Le Fevre, Peter (2008). "Leake, Sir Andrew". Oxford Dictionary of National Biography (online ed.). Oxford University Press. doi:10.1093/ref:odnb/16237. (Subscription, Wikipedia Library access or UK public library membership required.)
- Lavery, Brian (1983) The Ship of the Line – Volume 1: The development of the battlefleet 1650-1850. Conway Maritime Press. ISBN 0-85177-252-8.
- Winfield, Rif (1997), The 50-Gun Ship: A Complete History. Chatham Publishing (1st edition); Mercury Books (2nd edition 2005). ISBN 1-845600-09-6.
- Winfield, Rif (2009) British Warships in the Age of Sail 1603-1714: Design, Construction, Careers and Fates. Seaforth Publishing. ISBN 978-1-84832-040-6.
- Winfield, Rif (2007) British Warships in the Age of Sail 1714-1792: Design, Construction, Careers and Fates. Seaforth Publishing. ISBN 978-1-84415-700-6.
