= HMS Worcester (1698) =

Ship of the line of the Royal Navy

History

Great Britain
- Name: HMS Worcester
- Ordered: 24 December 1695
- Builder: Robert Winter, Southampton
- Launched: 31 May 1698
- Fate: Broken up, 1733

General characteristics as built
- Class & type: 50-gun fourth rate ship of the line
- Tons burthen: 689 57/94 bm
- Length: 131 ft 8.75 in (40.2 m) (gundeck) 109 ft 7 in (33.4 m) (keel)
- Beam: 34 ft 4.75 in (10.5 m)
- Depth of hold: 13 ft 6.25 in (4.1 m)
- Propulsion: Sails
- Sail plan: Full-rigged ship
- Armament: 50 guns of various weights of shot

General characteristics after 1714 rebuild
- Class & type: 1706 Establishment 50-gun fourth rate ship of the line
- Tons burthen: 719 34/94 bm
- Length: 130 ft 5 in (39.8 m) (gundeck) 108 ft 7 in (33.1 m) (
- Beam: 35 ft 3.5 in (10.8 m)
- Depth of hold: 14 ft (4.3 m)
- Propulsion: Sails
- Sail plan: Full-rigged ship
- Armament: 50 guns: Gundeck: 22 × 18 pdrs; Upper gundeck: 22 × 9 pdrs; Quarterdeck: 4 × 6 pdrs; Forecastle: 2 × 6 pdrs

HMS Worcester was a 50-gun fourth rate ship of the line of the Royal Navy, one of eight such ships authorised by the Navy Board on 24 December 1695 to be newly built (six by commercial contract and two in the Royal Dockyards); the others were the Hampshire, Dartmouth, Salisbury, Winchester, Jersey, Carlisle and Tilbury. The contract for the Worcester was signed with shipbuilder Robert Winter on 26 February 1696, for the ship to be built in his yard at Northam in Southampton, and she was launched there on 31 May 1698.

The vessel was rebuilt by Joseph Allin the elder at Deptford according to the 1706 Establishment at Deptford Dockyard and relaunched on 31 August 1714. She served in the North Sea, including participation in the May 1719 capture of Eilean Donan Castle during the Jacobite rising of 1719. Worcester was broken up at Portsmouth Dockyard in 1733, with a new 60-gun replacement of the same name being built there.
