= Gaubert =

Gaubert is a French surname. Notable people with the surname include:

- Danielle Gaubert (1943–1987), French actress
- Elsa Gaubert (born 2000), French female canoeist
- Ginette Gaubert (1904–1987), French actress
- Jean Gaubert (born 1947), French politician
- Jeremy Gaubert (born 1983), American poker player
- Patrick Gaubert (born 1948), French politician
- Philippe Gaubert (1879–1941), French musician
- Michel Gaubert (1956–present), French Music Supervisor

== See also ==
- Saint Waldebert
