= HMS Carlisle (1698) =

Ship of the line of the Royal Navy

History

England
- Name: HMS Carlisle
- Ordered: 24 December 1695
- Builder: Elias Waffe, Plymouth Dockyard
- Launched: 16 May 1698
- Fate: Accidentally blown up, 19 September 1700

General characteristics
- Class & type: 50-gun fourth rate ship of the line
- Tons burthen: 709 8/94 bm
- Length: 132 ft (40.2 m) (on gundeck) 112 ft (34.1 m) (keel)
- Beam: 34 ft 6 in (10.5 m)
- Depth of hold: 13 ft 2 in (4.0 m)
- Propulsion: Sails
- Sail plan: Full-rigged ship
- Armament: 50 guns of various weights of shot

HMS Carlisle was a 50-gun fourth rate ship of the line of the English Royal Navy, one of eight such ships authorised by the Navy Board on 24 December 1695 to be newly built (six by commercial contract and two in the Royal Dockyards); the others were the Hampshire, Dartmouth, Winchester, Salisbury, Worcester, Jersey and Tilbury. Construction of the Carlisle was awarded to Plymouth Dockyard, where she was designed and built by Master Shipwright Elias Waffe, and she was launched there on 16 May 1698. ]

It was accidentally blown up in the Downs on 19 September 1700, with the loss of 124 men - almost all aboard her - and there were just 8 survivors (although Captain Francis Dove survived as he was ashore at the time).
