= HMS Dartmouth (1698) =

Ship of the line of the Royal Navy

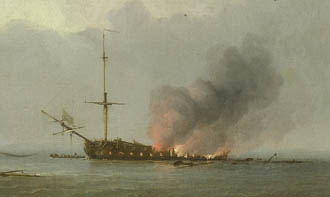
- The sinking of HMS Dartmouth, during the chase and capture of Glorioso, 8 October 1747

History

Great Britain
- Name: HMS Dartmouth
- Ordered: 24 December 1695
- Builder: James Parker, Southampton
- Launched: 3 March 1698
- Out of service: 8 October 1747
- Fate: Blew up and sank in action on 8 October 1747

General characteristics as built
- Class & type: 50-gun fourth-rate ship of the line
- Tons burthen: 681 47/94 bm
- Length: 131 ft 3 3/4 in (40.0 m) (gundeck) 108 ft 10 1/2 in (33.2 m) (keel)
- Beam: 34 ft 3 1/2 in (10.5 m)
- Depth of hold: 13 ft 6 1/2 in (4.1 m)
- Sail plan: Full-rigged ship
- Armament: 50 guns of various weights of shot

General characteristics after 1716 rebuild
- Class & type: 1706 Establishment 50-gun fourth-rate ship of the line
- Tons burthen: 711 67/94 bm
- Length: 130 ft 3 in (39.7 m) (gundeck) 108 ft 9 in (33.1 m) (keel)
- Beam: 35 ft 1 in (10.7 m)
- Depth of hold: 14 ft 4 in (4.4 m)
- Sail plan: Full-rigged ship
- Armament: 50 guns (see 1741 rebuild)

General characteristics after 1741 rebuild
- Class & type: 1733 proposals 50-gun fourth-rate ship of the line
- Tons burthen: 856 48/94 bm
- Length: 134 ft (40.8 m) (on gundeck) 108 ft 2 in (33.0 m) (keel)
- Beam: 38 ft 7 in (11.8 m)
- Depth of hold: 15 ft 9 in (4.8 m)
- Sail plan: Full-rigged ship
- Armament: 50 guns; Gundeck: 22 × 18-pounder guns; Upper gundeck: 22 × 9-pounder guns; QD: 4 × 6-pounder guns; Fc: 2 × 6-pounder guns

HMS Dartmouth was a 50-gun fourth-rate ship of the line of the Royal Navy, one of eight such ships authorised by the Navy Board on 24 December 1695 to be newly built (six by commercial contract and two in the Royal Dockyards); the others were the Hampshire, Winchester, Salisbury, Worcester, Jersey, Carlisle and Tilbury. The contract for the Dartmouth was signed in 1696 with shipbuilder James Parker, for the ship to be built in his site in Southampton, taking the name of the previous Dartmouth of 1693 (which had been captured by the French in 1695), and she was launched there on 3 March 1698.

== Career ==
The Dartmouth was ordered on 3 March 1714 to be rebuilt according to the 1706 Establishment at Woolwich Dockyard, where she was re-launched on 7 August 1716 and formed part of the naval task force sent to Scotland to help subdue the Jacobite rising of 1719. The ship was taken to pieces at Sheerness Dockyard in September 1733, in order to be rebuilt again, and on 8 October 1736 the material was ordered to be sent to Woolwich Dockyard, where work commenced according to the 1733 proposals of the 1719 Establishment. She was relaunched on 22 April 1741.

== Fate ==
The Dartmouth (under the command of Captain James Hamilton) blew up, killing most of her crew (only 12 survivors), near Cape St Vincent on 8 October 1747 in action against the Spanish ship of the line Glorioso.

== See also ==
- Voyage of the Glorioso
