= HMS Jersey (1698) =

Ship of the line of the Royal Navy

History

Great Britain
- Name: HMS Jersey
- Ordered: 24 December 1695
- Builder: Joseph Nye & George Moore, East Cowes
- Launched: 24 November 1698
- Fate: Sunk, 27 May 1763

General characteristics
- Class & type: 50-gun fourth rate ship of the line
- Tons burthen: 676 77/94 bm
- Length: 132 ft 1 in (40.3 m) (gundeck) 109 ft (33.2 m) (
- Beam: 34 ft 2 in (10.4 m)
- Depth of hold: 13 ft 8 in (4.2 m)
- Propulsion: Sails
- Sail plan: Full-rigged ship
- Armament: 50 guns: Gundeck: 22 × 18 pdrs; Upper gundeck: 22 × 9 pdrs; Quarterdeck: 4 × 6 pdrs; Forecastle: 2 × 6 pdrs

HMS Jersey was a 50-gun fourth rate ship of the line of the Royal Navy, one of eight such ships authorised by the Navy Board on 24 December 1695 to be newly built (six by commercial contract and two in the Royal Dockyards); the others were the Hampshire, Dartmouth, Salisbury, Winchester, Worcester, Carlisle and Tilbury. The contract for the Jersey was signed with shipbuilder Joseph Nye (and his partner, timber merchant George Moore) on 31 July 1696, for the ship to be built in his yard at East Cowes on the Isle of Wight for a contract price of £8-2-6d per ton, and she was launched there on 24 November 1698.

She was converted to serve as a hulk at Plymouth Dockyard in August 1731, and was deliberately sunk there on 27 May 1763.
