= Jeremy Gaubert =

American poker player (born 1983)

- Nickname: thechemist83
- Born: August 18, 1983 (age 43); Thibodaux, Louisiana, U.S.

World Series of Poker
- Bracelet: None
- Money finish: 1
- Highest WSOP Main Event finish: 58th, 2008

Jeremy Gaubert (born August 18, 1983) is an American professional poker player. He is best known for winning the 2009 World Poker Open. He is also a co-founder of mttbacking.com, a site dedicated to backing online poker players.

== Poker accomplishments ==
As of 2023, Gaubert's live tournament earnings exceed $810,000.

=== Online Play ===
Gaubert has developed a reputation as one of the best online players in the world. In 2007, he chopped the Sunday Million tournament on PokerStars for $233,152. The same day, he finished second in the Sunday Mulligan (a supplemental tournament to the larger and more heavily advertised Sunday Million) for $178,000. On November 2, 2008 he won a rebuy tournament on Full Tilt Poker for $61,837.50. On January 25, 2009 he won the prestigious $55 rebuy tournament on PokerStars for $31,593.75. He again won the Sunday Mulligan on April 26, 2009, this time cashing for $52,695. His total online tournament winnings are estimated by Cardplayer at over $1.3 million.

=== 2008 WSOP Main Event ===
The 2008 World Series of Poker saw Gaubert make his first deep run in the Main Event. He finished 58th out of 6,844 participants for a $115,800 payday. Rather than using his clothing as advertising space for sponsors, he delighted his best friend, Michael Castelli, and fans by wearing a bright yellow "LSU" cap throughout his main event run.

=== 2009 World Poker Open ===
Gaubert claimed his first major live tournament victory at the 2009 World Poker Open in Robinsonville, Mississippi. He defeated a final table that included 2003 World Series of Poker Main Event winner Chris Moneymaker and noted professional player Chad Brown. In the final hand, Gaubert's pocket aces held up to beat his opponent's top pair of tens to win the tournament and $192,953.

== Personal life ==
Gaubert was born in Thibodaux, Louisiana, where he lives with his wife. He attended E.D. White High School in Thibodaux, and graduated from Nicholls State University in 2008.
