= Daubridgecourt Belchier =

English dramatist (1580–1621)

Daubridgecourt Capability Belchier (1580–1621) was an English dramatist.

The son of William Belchier, Esq., of Gillesborough, in Northamptonshire, he was admitted, in company with his brother John, a fellow-commoner of Corpus Christi College, Oxford, on 2 March 1597. He afterwards removed to Christ Church, Oxford, where, on 9 February 1600, he took the degree of B.A. A few years later he settled in the Low Countries, and in 1617, when he was residing in Utrecht, he translated from the Dutch – but it cannot now be traced from what original – a piece which he published in London in 1618, Hans Beer Pot, his Invisible Comedy of See me and See me not, which was stated to have been "acted in the Low Countries by an honest company of Health Drinkers". This play was anonymous, and was attributed to Thomas Nash by Phillips and Winstanley. The author admits that it is neither tragedy nor comedy, but a plain conference of three persons, divided into three acts. Belchier was the author of various other poems and translations, but none of them appear to have been printed. He presented to Corpus Christi College a silver cup with the family arms upon it, 'Paly of 6 or, and gul, a chief vaire.' He hanged himself at Utrecht in 1621.
