= HMS Russell (1692) =

Ship of the line of the Royal Navy

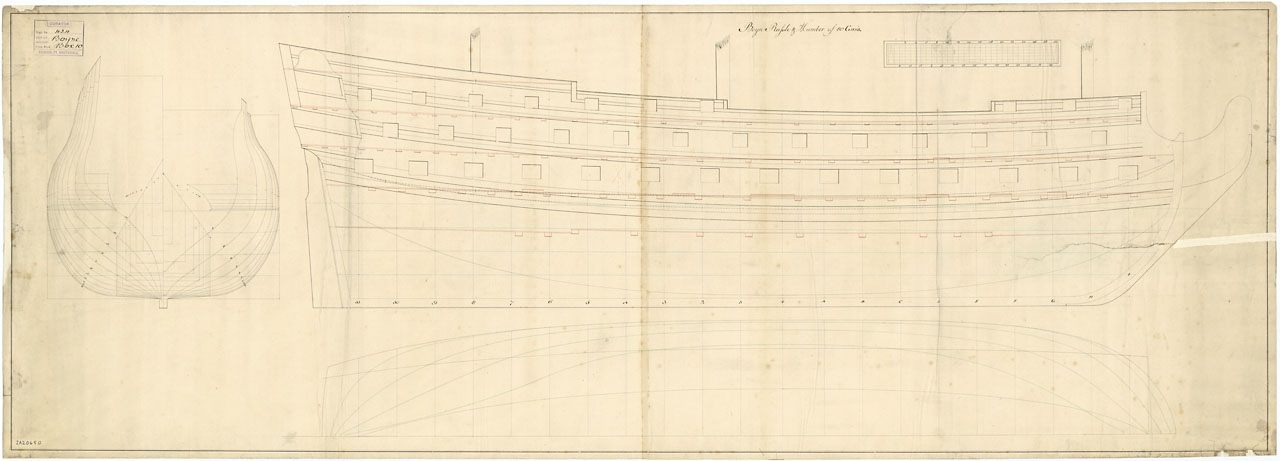
- Russell (1709 plan)

History

Great Britain
- Name: HMS Russell
- Builder: Stigant, Portsmouth Dockyard
- Launched: 3 June 1692
- Fate: Sunk as breakwater, 1762

General characteristics as built
- Class & type: 80-gun third rate ship of the line
- Tons burthen: 1,177
- Length: 155 ft 6 in (47.4 m) (gundeck)
- Beam: 41 ft 6 in (12.6 m)
- Depth of hold: 17 ft 4 in (5.3 m)
- Propulsion: Sails
- Sail plan: Full-rigged ship
- Armament: 80 guns of various weights of shot

General characteristics after 1709 rebuild
- Class & type: 1706 Establishment 80-gun third rate ship of the line
- Tons burthen: 1,294
- Length: 156 ft (47.5 m) (gundeck)
- Beam: 43 ft 6 in (13.3 m)
- Depth of hold: 17 ft 8 in (5.4 m)
- Propulsion: Sails
- Sail plan: Full-rigged ship
- Armament: 80 guns: Gundeck: 26 × 32 pdrs; Middle gundeck: 26 × 12 pdrs; Upper gundeck: 24 × 6 pdrs; Quarterdeck: 4 × 6 pdrs

General characteristics after 1735 rebuild
- Class & type: 1719 Establishment 80-gun third rate ship of the line
- Tons burthen: 1,350
- Length: 158 ft (48.2 m) (gundeck)
- Beam: 44 ft 6 in (13.6 m)
- Depth of hold: 18 ft 2 in (5.5 m)
- Propulsion: Sails
- Sail plan: Full-rigged ship
- Armament: 80 guns: Gundeck: 26 × 32 pdrs; Middle gundeck: 26 × 12 pdrs; Upper gundeck: 24 × 6 pdrs; Quarterdeck: 4 × 6 pdrs

HMS Russell was an 80-gun third rate ship of the line of the Royal Navy, launched at Portsmouth Dockyard on 3 June 1692. She was rebuilt according to the 1706 Establishment at Rotherhithe, and was relaunched on 16 March 1709. Instead of mounting her 80 guns on two decks, as she had done as originally built, she now mounted them on three decks, but remained classified as a third rate. On 4 February 1729 she was ordered to be taken to pieces and rebuilt to the 1719 Establishment at Deptford, from where she was relaunched on 8 September 1735.

Russell was sunk as a breakwater in 1762.

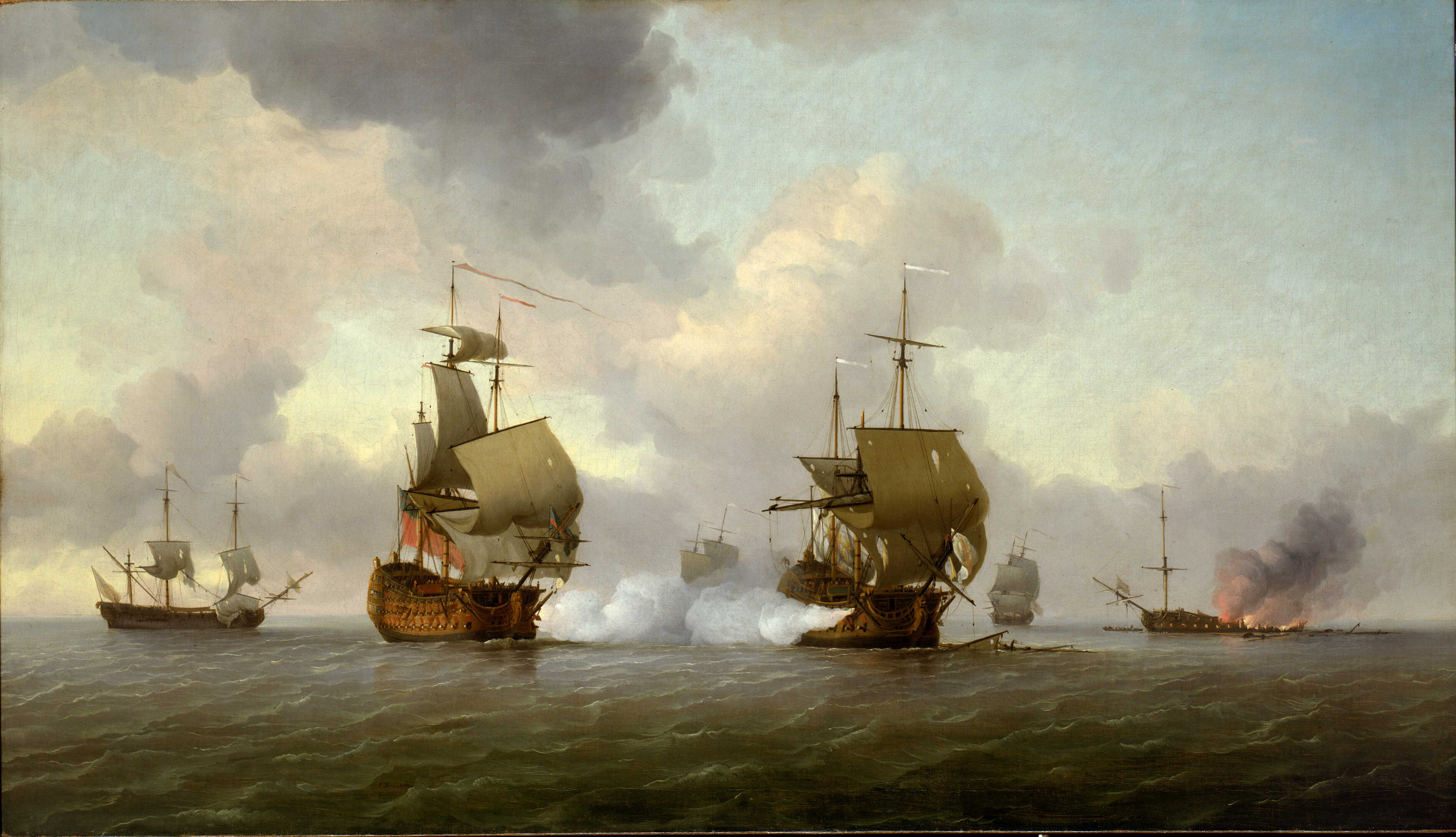
Russell (second from left) during the final voyage of the Glorioso
