= Jalabert =

Jalabert is a last name that could refer to:

- Berthe Jalabert, French actress
- Charles Jalabert (1819–1901), French painter in the academic style
- Laurent Jalabert (born 1968), French former professional cyclist
- Louis Jalabert (1877-1943), French Jesuit, archaeologist and epigrapher
- Luc Jalabert (1951-2018), French bullfighter
- Nicolas Jalabert (born 1973), French cyclist, brother of Laurent
