= Cape St. Vincent =

Southwesternmost point of Portugal

Cape St. Vincent Cabo de São Vicente (Portuguese)
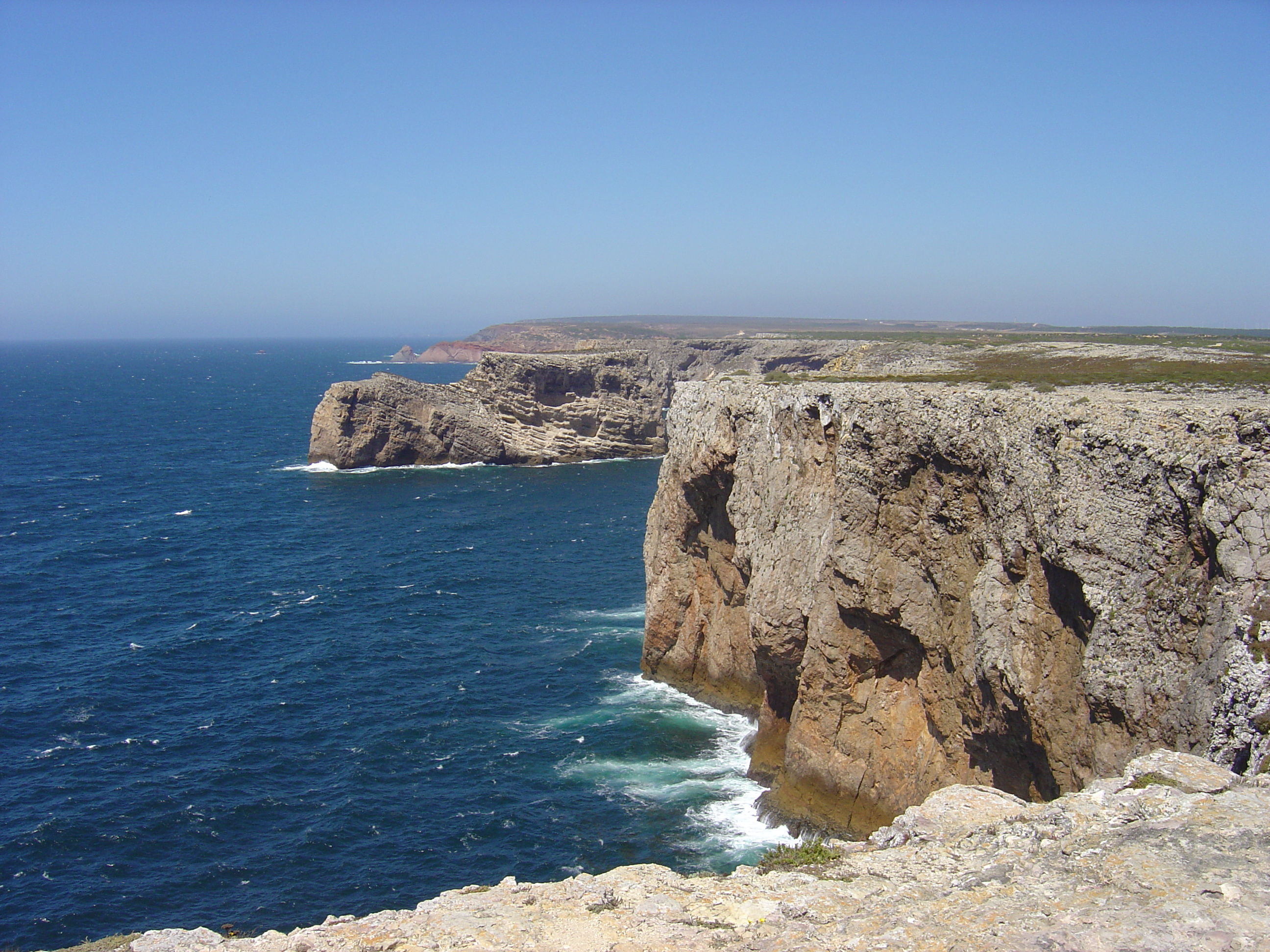
- North shore of Cape St. Vincent as seen from the lighthouse

- Location of the Cabo de São Vicente in continental Portugal
- Coordinates: 37°1′30″N 8°59′40″W
- Location: Portugal, Algarve, Faro, Sagres
- Part of: Southwest Alentejo and Vicentine Coast Natural Park
- Etymology: Vincent of Saragossa

Cape St. Vincent (Portuguese: Cabo de São Vicente, Portuguese pronunciation: [ˈkaβu ðɨ sɐ̃w viˈsẽtɨ]) is a headland in the municipality of Vila do Bispo, in the Algarve, southern Portugal. It is the southwesternmost point of Portugal and of mainland Europe.

== History ==
Cape St. Vincent was already sacred ground in Neolithic times, as standing menhirs in the neighborhood attest. The ancient Greeks called it Ophiussa (Land of Serpents), inhabited by the Oestriminis and dedicated here a temple to Heracles. The Romans called it Promontorium Sacrum (or Holy Promontory). Strabo, in his Geography calls this cape the most western tip of the known world and reports the place was considered magical. Common people believed the sun sank here hissing into the ocean, marking the edge of their world, which Strabo qualifies as "common and vulgar reports" and attributes to Posidonius

According to legend, the current name of this cape is linked to the story of a martyred fourth-century Iberian deacon St. Vincent whose body was brought ashore here. A shrine was erected over his grave; according to the Arab geographer Al-Idrisi, it was always guarded by ravens and is therefore named by him كنيسة الغراب (Kanīsah al-Ghurāb, meaning "Church of the Raven"). King Afonso Henriques (1139–1185) had the body of the saint exhumed in 1173 and brought it by ship to Lisbon, still accompanied by the ravens. This transfer of the relics is depicted on the coat of arms of Lisbon. All existing buildings—including the Vila do Infante of Henry the Navigator—fell into ruins because of the Lisbon earthquake of 1755. The Franciscan friars who cared for the shrine stayed on until 1834, when all monasteries were disbanded in Portugal.

=== Naval battles ===
Numerous sea battles have been fought off the cape:

- In 1337, a Castilian fleet defeated a Portuguese fleet in the Battle of Cape St. Vincent (1337).
- In 1606, a Spanish fleet defeated a Dutch fleet in the Battle of Cape St. Vincent (1606).
- In 1641, a Spanish fleet fought with a Dutch fleet in the Battle of Cape St. Vincent (1641).
- In 1681, a Spanish fleet defeated a Brandenburger fleet in the action of 30 September 1681.
- In 1693, a French fleet defeated an Anglo-Dutch squadron in the Battle of Lagos (1693).
- In 1719, a Spanish fleet defeated a British squadron in the Battle of Cape St. Vincent (1719).
- In 1751, a Spanish fleet defeated an Algerian fleet in the action of 28 November 1751.
- In January 1780, a British fleet defeated a Spanish fleet in the Battle of Cape St. Vincent (1780).
- In August 1780, a Spanish fleet (along with French ships), defeated a British convoy in the action of 9 August 1780.
- In 1797, a British fleet defeated a Spanish fleet in the Battle of Cape St. Vincent (1797).
- In 1833, a Loyalist fleet defeated a Miguelite fleet in the Battle of Cape St. Vincent (1833).

== Geography ==
This cape is the southwesternmost point in Portugal. It forms the southwestern end of the E9 European Coastal Path, which runs for 5,000 km (3,100 mi) to Narva-Jõesuu in Estonia. Approximately six kilometers from the village of Sagres, the cape is a landmark for a ship traveling to or from the Mediterranean. The cliffs rise nearly vertically from the Atlantic to a height of 75 metres (250 ft). The cape is a site of exuberant marine life and a high concentration of birds nesting on the cliffs, such as the rare Bonelli's eagle, peregrine falcons, kites, rock thrushes, rock pigeons, storks and herons.

The present lighthouse is 24 metres (79 ft) high and was built over the ruins of a 16th-century Franciscan convent in 1846. The statues of St. Vincent and St. Francis Xavier had been moved to church of Nossa Senhora da Graça on Point Sagres 3 kilometres (2 mi) away. This lighthouse, guarding one of the world's busiest shipping lanes, is among the most powerful in Europe (the most powerful being Phare du Creach on the French island of Ushant, off the coast of Brittany); its two 1,000-watt lamps can be seen as far as 60 kilometres (40 mi) away.

=== Climate ===
Cape St. Vincent has a Mediterranean climate with very low seasonal variation and high occurrence of fogs.

Climate data for Cape St. Vincent, 1931-1960, elevation: 67 m or 220 ft
Month	Jan	Feb	Mar	Apr	May	Jun	Jul	Aug	Sep	Oct	Nov	Dec	Year
Record high °C (°F)	19.8 (67.6)	24.5 (76.1)	22.0 (71.6)	27.0 (80.6)	30.7 (87.3)	30.1 (86.2)	35.5 (95.9)	32.0 (89.6)	31.0 (87.8)	28.0 (82.4)	24.5 (76.1)	22.0 (71.6)	35.5 (95.9)
Mean daily maximum °C (°F)	14.8 (58.6)	15.1 (59.2)	16.3 (61.3)	17.9 (64.2)	19.2 (66.6)	20.8 (69.4)	21.5 (70.7)	21.7 (71.1)	21.8 (71.2)	20.6 (69.1)	17.8 (64.0)	15.5 (59.9)	18.6 (65.4)
Daily mean °C (°F)	12.6 (54.7)	12.8 (55.0)	14.0 (57.2)	15.2 (59.4)	16.6 (61.9)	18.2 (64.8)	18.8 (65.8)	19.1 (66.4)	19.2 (66.6)	18.2 (64.8)	15.6 (60.1)	13.4 (56.1)	16.1 (61.1)
Mean daily minimum °C (°F)	10.5 (50.9)	10.6 (51.1)	11.8 (53.2)	12.4 (54.3)	13.9 (57.0)	15.5 (59.9)	16.2 (61.2)	16.5 (61.7)	16.6 (61.9)	15.8 (60.4)	13.5 (56.3)	11.4 (52.5)	13.7 (56.7)
Record low °C (°F)	0.4 (32.7)	0.5 (32.9)	5.0 (41.0)	3.5 (38.3)	8.5 (47.3)	9.0 (48.2)	9.8 (49.6)	12.0 (53.6)	9.5 (49.1)	9.0 (48.2)	0.6 (33.1)	2.5 (36.5)	0.4 (32.7)
Average precipitation mm (inches)	63 (2.5)	47 (1.9)	61 (2.4)	38 (1.5)	24 (0.9)	5 (0.2)	2 (0.1)	1 (0.0)	14 (0.6)	46 (1.8)	60 (2.4)	56 (2.2)	417 (16.5)
Average relative humidity (%)	79	79	81	79	81	84	84	85	84	81	81	78	81
Mean monthly sunshine hours	155	177	207	257	300	318	339	326	256	224	172	166	2,897
Source: IPMA

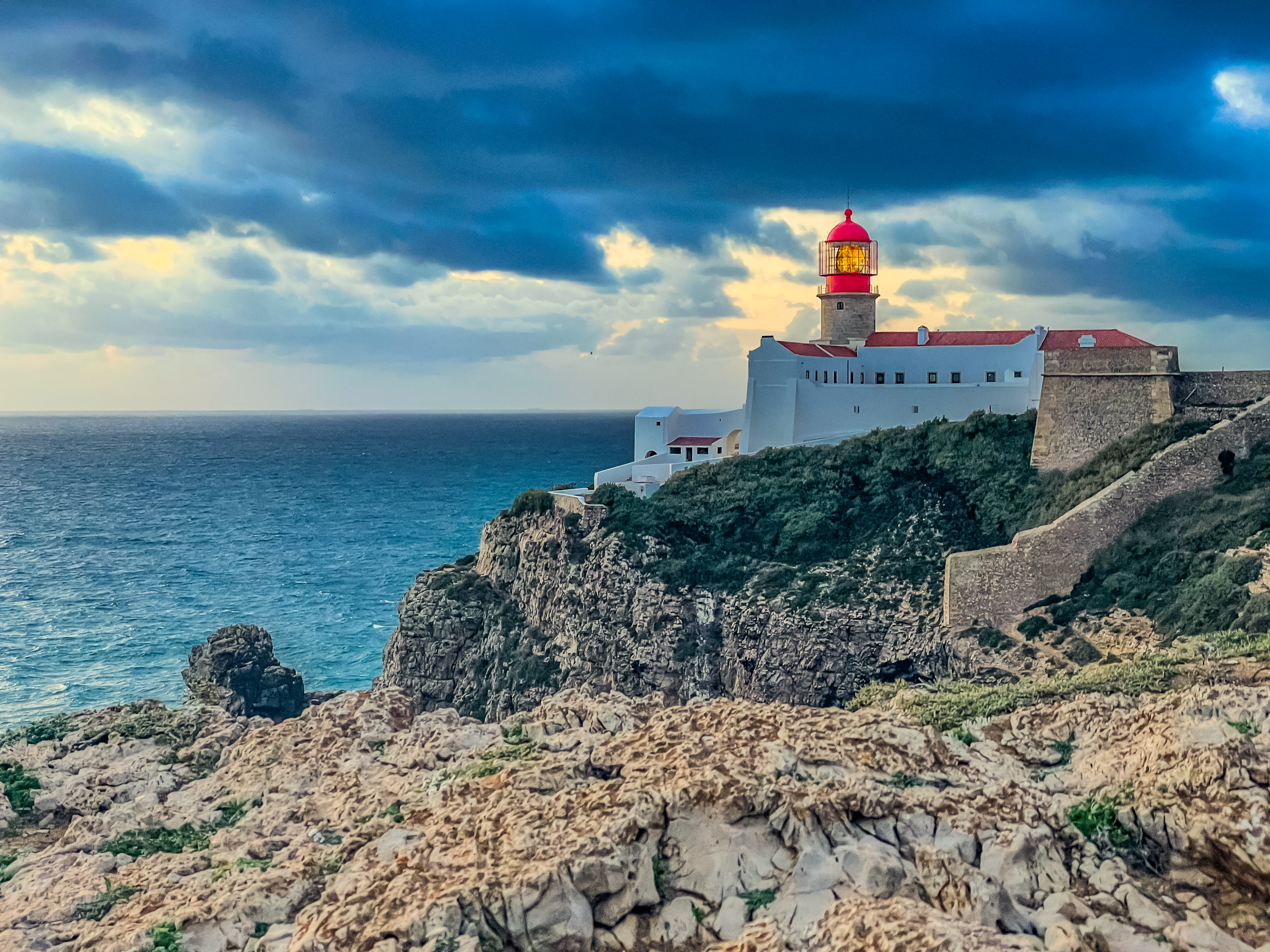

== Gallery ==
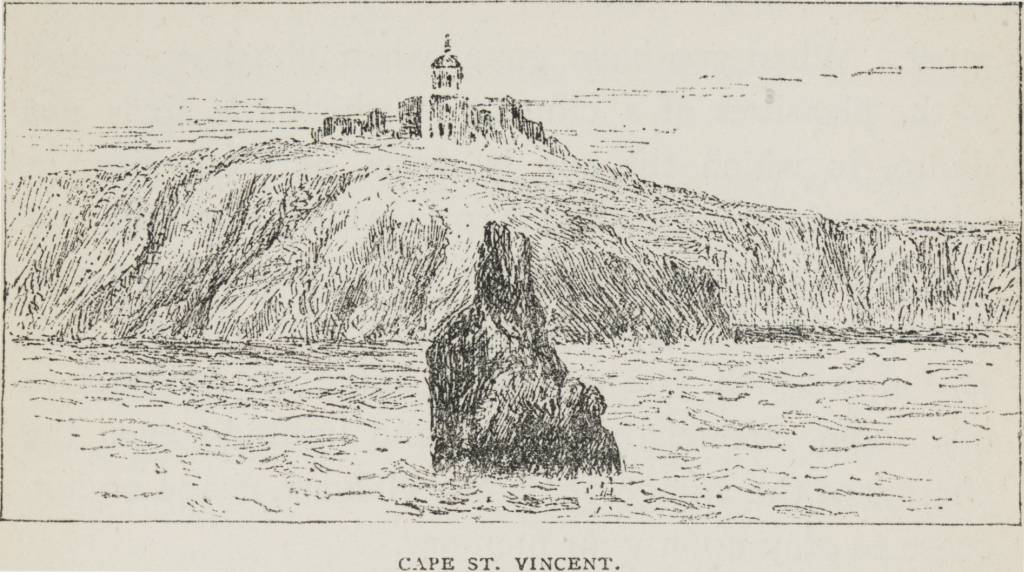
An 1879 sketch of the St. Vincent lighthouse

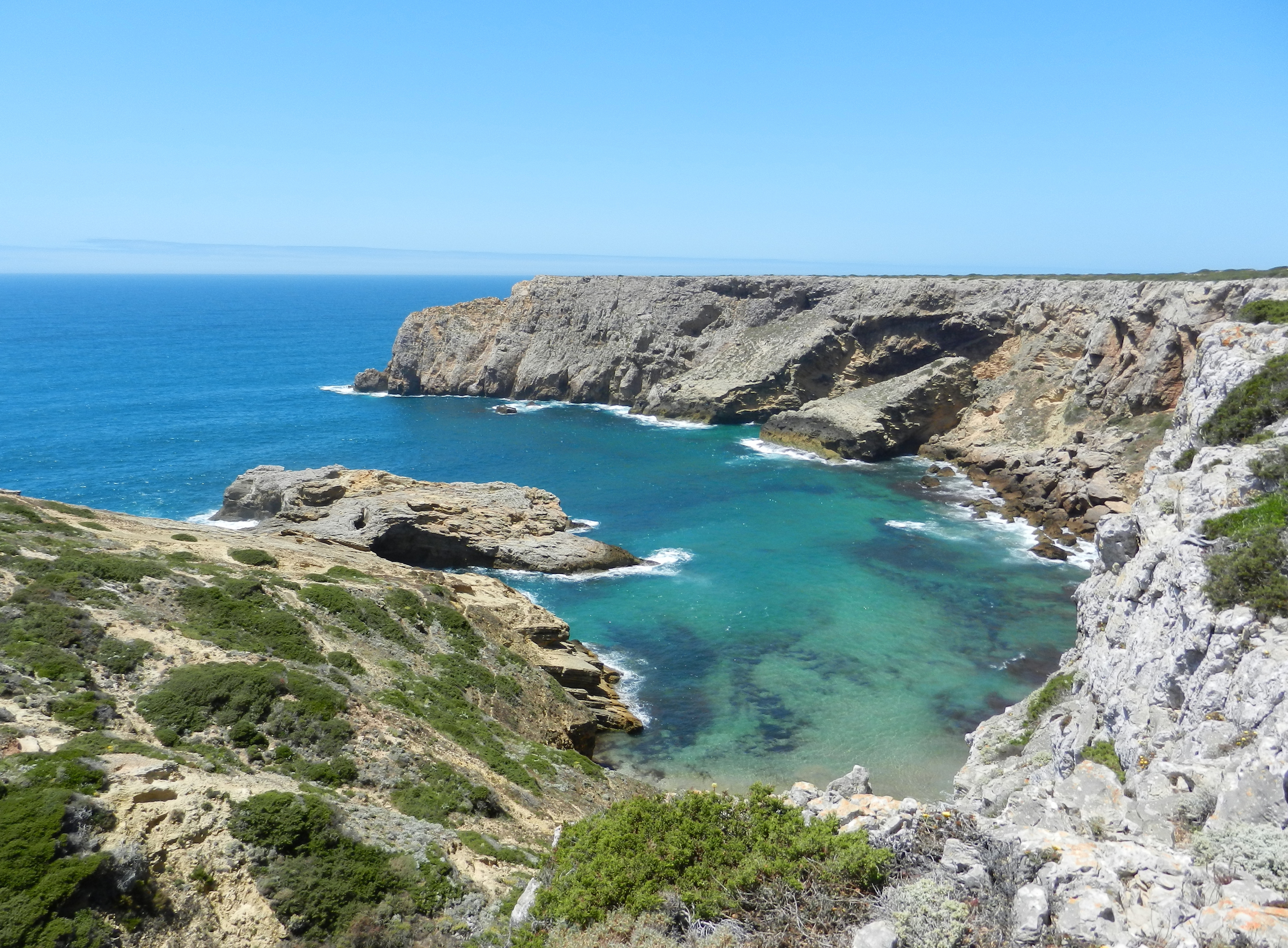
The cliffs of the St. Vincent coast

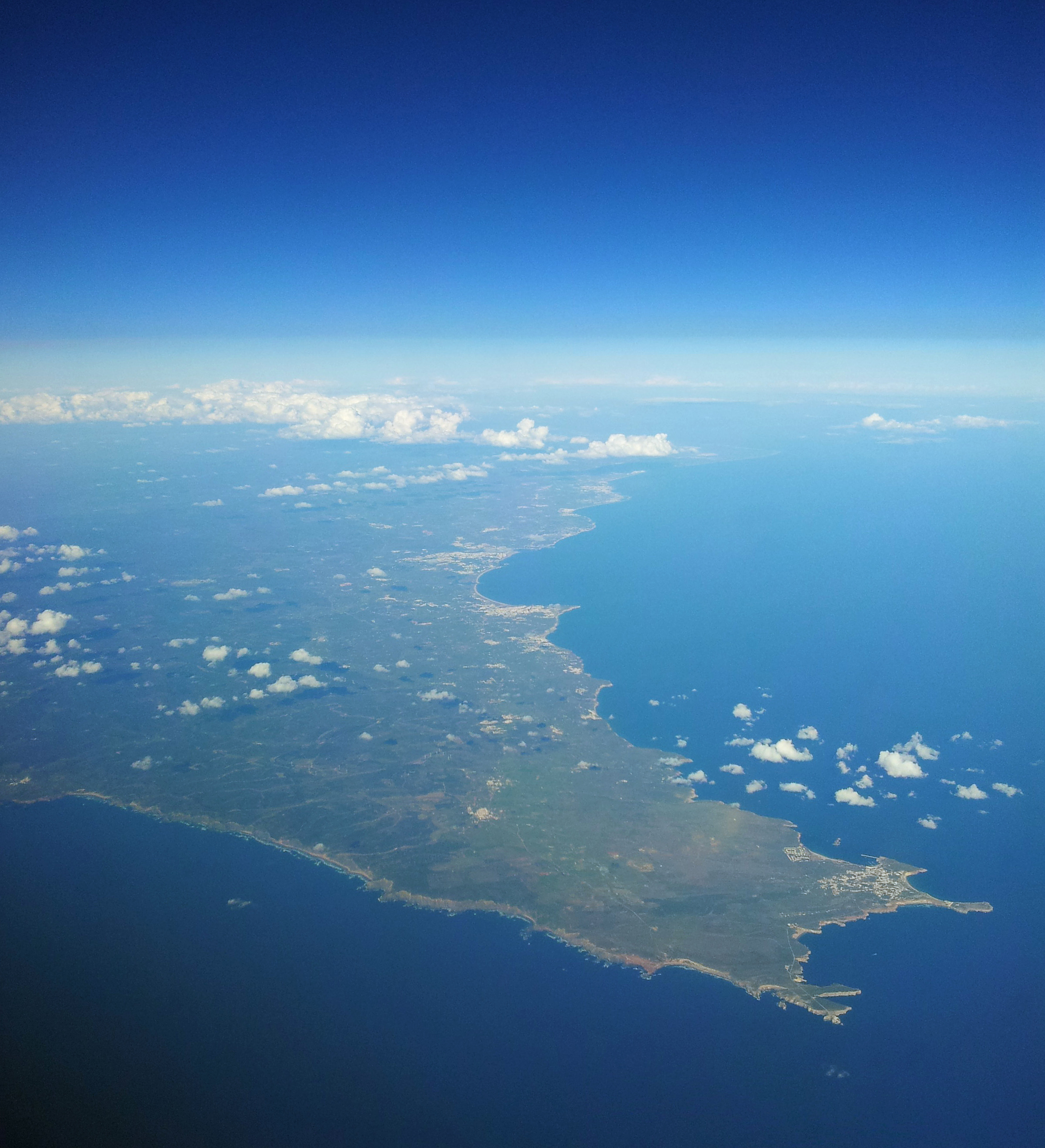
An aerial view of the southwestern St. Vincent coast

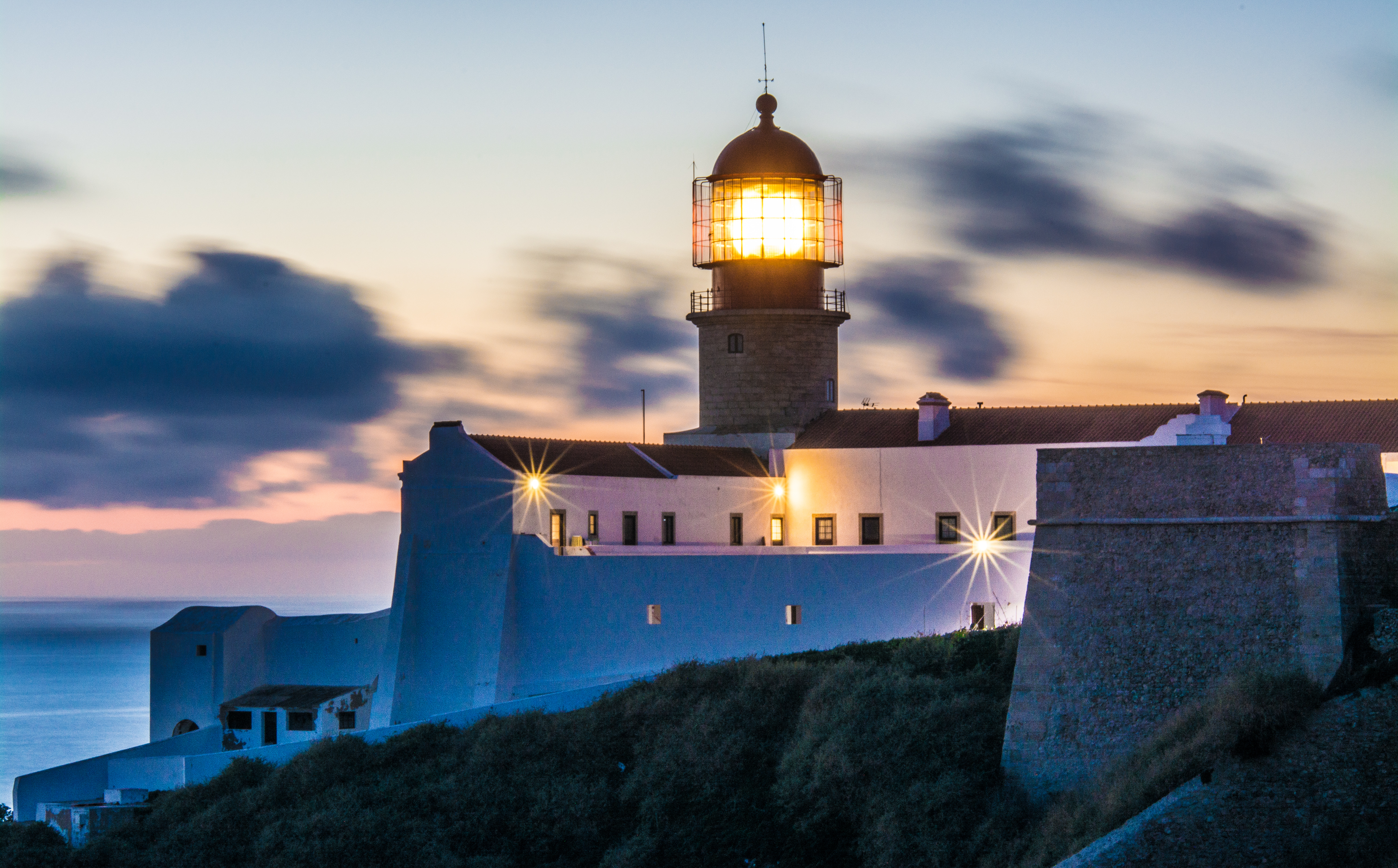
Cape St. Vincent lighthouse
