= List of fireships of the Royal Navy =

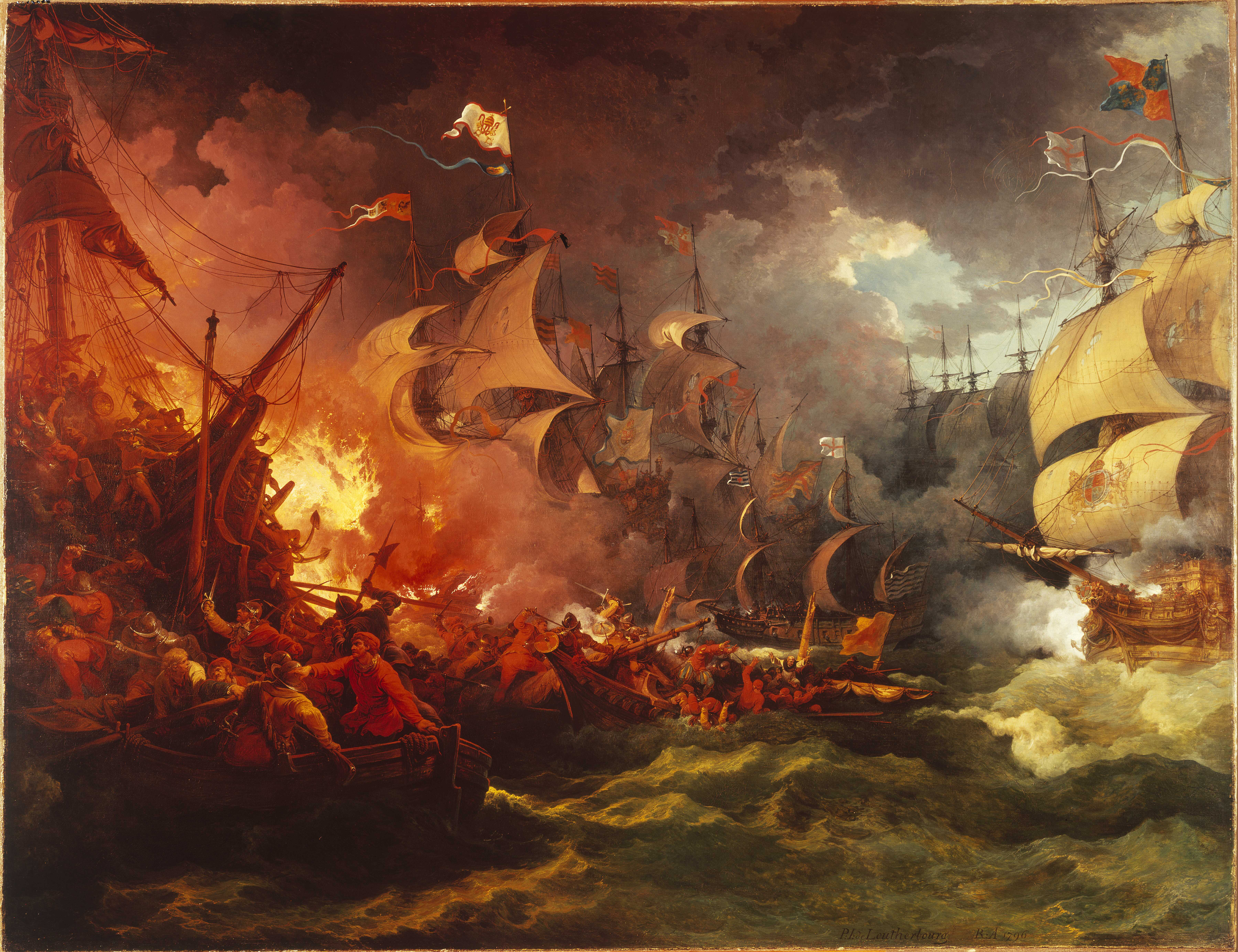
The Battle of Gravelines depicted in Defeat of the Spanish Armada, by Philippe-Jacques de Loutherbourg. English fireships cause havoc amongst the Spanish ships.

Fireships served in the Royal Navy over a period of several centuries. The earliest fireships – ships filled with combustible and flammable materials and explosives and sent into lines of enemy ships to attempt to set them on fire – were small merchant vessels deployed in large fleet actions, such as by Sir Francis Drake against the Spanish Armada at the Battle of Gravelines in 1588. Fire was a major hazard on the wooden warships of the time, which carried large quantities of flammable and explosive materials into battle. Both sides used fireships in a number of engagements during the Anglo–Spanish War, with varying levels of effectiveness. Fireships reappeared in unconventional forms during the English Civil War, and were used in earnest during the Anglo-Dutch Wars, particularly to great effect in 1666 during Holmes's Bonfire. Successes such as the burning of the Royal James at the Battle of Solebay in 1672 caused considerable interest in the application of such vessels, eventually resulting in the construction of purpose-built ships. Interest in the fireship declined during the eighteenth century. Though new vessels continued to be taken into service, they did not play a significant role in either the Seven Years' War or the American War of Independence. There was a resurgence in the use of fireships during the 1790s during the wars with France, and they were deployed with some success by Thomas Cochrane at the Battle of the Basque Roads in 1809, but they were steadily supplanted by new methods of war, such as heated shot, torpedoes and mines.

The vessels employed by the navy in the fireship role were very varied. They were initially often converted warships or merchant vessels between 60 and 90 feet in length. Despite their rating, most served as sloops or frigates, only being fitted with combustible materials when there was the intention to expend them. The ships used were generally purchased and converted vessels, as it was not considered cost-effective to build new ships with the intention of burning them when a cheaper option existed. Purpose-built fireships were therefore a rarity, though some classes were built during the eighteenth and early nineteenth centuries. Ship's boats were used for a similar purpose, carrying parties of men with combustible materials over to enemy ships, often while they were at anchor. New methods of attack were being pioneered by the early nineteenth century. The Raid on Boulogne in 1804 used fireships, but also new devices designed by Robert Fulton. By the time of the attack at the Basque Roads, fireships were being used to fire rockets as well. Eventually the inherent problems involved in deploying fireships effectively, such as the difficulty of manoeuvring effectively to catch an enemy warship, and the development of new forms of attack, led to the fireship falling out of use. While they served with the Royal Navy fireships tended to be given names associated with fire, for example, names of volcanoes. Examples included Spitfire, Torch, Vulcan, Furnace, Aetna and Vesuvius.

== Earliest ships ==
=== 1690 – 1714 ===
The success of the Dutch fireship attack in 1672 led to the first enquiries from the Admiralty about the possibility of producing a purpose-built fireship design. One ship, HMY Suadadoes built in 1670 for Catherine of Braganza -Charles II wife as yacht, had an approximate tonnage of 86 tons. It was more than doubled to 188 tons when rebuilt in 1674, becoming HMS Soldado a sixth-rate of 16 guns, used as a fireship in the Battle of Bantry Bay in May 1689. Though this did not result in any new ships the idea was revisited in 1689 with the construction of twelve fireships, similar to existing fifth rates, but specially modified to burn effectively. A further eight vessels were ordered in 1690, with two more in 1693 and another one in 1694.

==== 1689 programme ====
- Dolphin
- Speedwell
- Spy
- Hopewell
- Fox
- Griffin
- Hawk
- Roebuck
- Hound
- Vulture
- Wolf
- Hunter

==== 1690 programme ====
- Vulcan
- Blaze
- Flame
- Strombolo
- Aetna
- Phaeton
- Lightning
- Vesuvius

==== 1693-4 programme ====
- Phoenix
- Firebrand
- Terrible
- Vesuvius
- Blaze

==== Rebuilt fireships ====
The earlier fireships Griffin and Speedwell of 1690 were rebuilt between 1700–3. The Speedwell was broken up to be rebuilt as a sixth rate in 1715, leaving the Griffin as the only remaining fireship in the navy by that point. The Phoenix of 1694 was rebuilt in 1709, but was reclassified as a sixth rate in 1711. These three vessels became the last purpose-built fireships in the navy until the 1780s, though numbers of vessels were taken up and converted throughout the eighteenth century.

- Speedwell (rebuilt and launched in 1702)
- Griffin (rebuilt and launched in 1702)
- Phoenix (rebuilt and launched in 1709)

== 1714 – 1752 ==
The Griffin of 1702 remained in service into the late 1730s, but few other fireships, a term by now interchangeable with the 20-gun sixth rate, were brought into service with the navy during the years of peace. Several frigates were re-rated as fireships during the early years of the eighteenth century, but continued to operate in the cruiser role. The first large scale expansion began with the tensions in 1739 that led to the War of Jenkins' Ear and the War of the Austrian Succession, with five merchants being converted in June, and another eight in October. In common with the earlier vessels they were mostly employed as sloops, with only two being expended as fireships. Most were disposed of by 1745, and were replaced by further merchant vessels acquired in 1744 and 1745, and the conversion of some existing sloops and frigates.

=== Re-rated frigates ===
- Garland (between 1716 and 1721)
- Valeur (between 1716 and 1718)
- Poole (between 1719 and 1737)
- Bridgewater (between 1727 and 1729)
- Solebay (between 1734 and 1742)
- Success (between 1739 and 1743)

=== Converted merchants (1739) ===
- Anne Galley
- Duke
- Eleanor
- Mercury
- Cumberland
- Strombolo
- Blaze
- Vulcan
- Vesuvius
- Phaeton
- Aetna
- Firebrand
- Scipio

=== Converted merchants (1744) ===
- Nazareth

=== Ex-French prizes (1745–1746) ===
- Duke
- Conqueror
- Louisbourg (intended for conversion but captured by a privateer before it could take place)

=== Converted sloops (1746) ===
- Vulcan
- Pluto
- Salamander

=== Converted sixth rate (1747) ===
- Dolphin

== Seven Years' War (1756–1763) ==
There were no fireships in service by the early 1750s, but the outbreak of the Seven Years' War led to the purchase of three merchant vessels in 1756, with six more acquired by early 1757. A seventh was added in 1760, while four existing navy sloops were converted between 1758 and 1762.

=== Converted merchants (1756–1760) ===
- Proserpine
- Blast
- Blaze
- Etna
- Vesuvius
- Strombolo
- Pluto
- Proserpine
- Salamander
- Protector

=== Converted warships (1755–1762) ===
- Lightning (converted in 1755)
- Cormorant (converted in 1758)
- Roman Emperor (converted in 1758)
- Raven (converted in 1762)

== Purchased vessels (1771) ==
The Admiralty initially intended to purchase three vessels to be converted to fireships. Only two were purchased, but neither was converted. Both instead entered service as ship sloops under different names.

- Etna (later Scorpion)
- Vesuvius (later Raven)

== American War of Independence (1775–1783) ==
The outbreak of war with the American colonies in 1775 led to the purchase of a range of merchant vessels for conversion, though most spent their careers employed as sloops. These were supplemented by the conversion of twelve existing navy sloops. A significant development during this period was the reintroduction of purpose-built fireships to the navy, the first for seventy years. The Tisiphone class was introduced during the later stages of the war, and all of the vessels of the class were still in service by the outbreak of the French Revolutionary Wars a decade later, though most had served as sloops, or been officially re-rated as sloops at some point in their careers.

=== Purpose-built ===
- Tisiphone class (1781)
  - Tisiphone
  - Alecto
  - Spitfire
  - Pluto
  - Incendiary
  - Comet
  - Megaera
  - Conflagration
  - Vulcan

=== Purchased vessels (1777–1782) ===
- Vulcan
- Sulphur
- Volcano
- Lucifer
- Incendiary
- Infernal
- Furnace
- Spitfire
- Lucifer
- Conflagration
- Combustion

=== Converted warships (1775–1779) ===
- Strombolo (converted in 1775)
- Pluto (converted in 1777)
- Firebrand (converted in 1778)
- Salamander (converted in 1778)
- Snake (converted in 1779)
- Harpy (converted in 1779)
- Lightning (converted in 1779)
- Basilisk (converted in 1779)
- Comet (converted in 1779)
- Spitfire (converted in 1779)
- Blast (converted in 1779)
- Explosion (conversion begun in 1779, but not completed. Returned to sloop in 1783)

== French Revolutionary and Napoleonic Wars (1793–1815) ==
In addition to the ships of the Tisiphone class, the Admiralty expanded its fleet with the acquisition in 1794 of a number of merchant vessels. Most served as small gunvessels, and none were expended as fireships. Another twenty-two small vessels were purchased in 1804, though only four were expended in this role. About this time the Admiralty ordered a six-ship class of fireships. The ships of the resulting Thais class were employed in the sloop role, and were re-rated as such in 1808. They eventually became sixth rate frigates in 1817. Another twenty-one ships were acquired in 1809 for the attack on the French at the Basque Roads, with all of them being expended there.

=== Purpose-built ===
- Thais class (1805)
  - Thais
  - Tartarus
  - Prometheus
  - Lightning
  - Erebus
  - Comet

=== Purchased vessels ===
==== 1794 ====
- Amity
- Catherine
- Experiment
- Firebrand
- Friendship
- Heart of Oak
- Industry
- Lively
- Olive Branch
- Satisfaction
- Nancy
- Akers

==== 1797–1801 ====
- Goonang Api
- Victoire

==== 1804 ====
- Eruption
- Incendiary
- Phosphorus
- Sophie
- Ignition
- Beacon
- Firebrand
- Flambeau
- Flash
- Fuze
- Rocket
- Salamander
- Squib
- Torch
- Firedrake
- Wildfire
- Firebrand
- Rifleman
- Devonshire
- Peggy
- Providence
- Amity

==== 1809 ====
Vessels used at the Battle of the Basque Roads:

- Adventure
- Agenoria
- Alicia
- Apollo
- Ceres
- George
- Harmony
- Hercules
- Mary (1808)
- Merchant
- Ocean
- Pomona
- Sally
- Sally
- Sisters
- Sophia
- Thomas
- Tiber
- Triptolemus
- William
- Zephyr

== See also ==
- Hellburners
- Operation Lucid
