= Olive Branch (ship) =

Several vessels have been named Olive Branch, for the olive branch:

== Olive Branch (1775 ship) ==
- Olive Branch (1775 ship) was launched in Philadelphia. From at least 1776 on she sailed as a West Indiaman from Great Britain. In 1791 she sailed as a whaler to the British Southern Whale Fishery, but was lost in August, early in the outbound leg of her voyage.

== Olive Branch (1777 ship) ==
- Olive Branch (1777 ship) was launched at Whitby. She spent much of her career as a coaster out of Hull, and sailing between Hull and the Baltic. In March 1807 Olive Branch, Wilson, master, sailed from Hull bound for the Greenland Whale Fishery. She disappeared on the outbound leg after leaving Shetland.

== Olive Branch (1788 ship) ==
- Olive Branch (1788 ship) was launched in 1777 in America, possibly under a different name. In 1788–1789 she made one voyage as a whaler in the British Southern Whale Fishery. On her return she traded with Gibraltar and the Mediterranean. She was last listed in 1793.

== Olive Branch (1797 ship) ==
- Olive Branch, of between 180 and 200 tons (bm), was launched in 1797 at Broadstairs as a West Indiaman, and first appeared Lloyd's Register (LR) in 1797. In April 1808 Lloyd's List reported that Caledonia, Thompson, master, had recaptured Olive Branch, Patridge, master, which had been sailing from London to Berbice when a privateer had captured her. Olive Branch arrived in Demerara. She then returned in order to the West Indies trade, trading with Sierra Leone, and trading between Bristol and Quebec. She was last listed in 1822.

== Olive Branch (1818 ship) ==
- Olive Branch (1818 ship) was launched in 1818 at Cowes. She was one of several vessels that a gale wrecked at the Cape of Good Hope on 21 July 1822. She returned to service and on some or more of her voyages to the Cape she sailed to Mauritius under a licence from the British East India Company (EIC). She burnt at sea in November 1843 while sailing between Quebec and London.

== See also ==
- HMS Olive Branch – one of four or five fire ships of the British Royal Navy
