= HMS Firebrand =

Eleven ships of the Royal Navy have borne the name HMS Firebrand.

- HMS Firebrand (1694) was an 8-gun fireship launched in 1694 and wrecked in 1707.
- HMS Firebrand (1739) was an 8-gun fireship, previously the civilian vessel Charming Jenny. She was purchased in 1739 and sold in 1743.
- HMS Firebrand was a 10-gun fireship, previously a 20-gun sixth rate launched in 1731 as HMS Dolphin. She was converted to a fireship in 1746 and renamed HMS Firebrand in 1755. She was reconverted to a sixth rate in 1757 and renamed HMS Penguin. The French captured her in 1760.
- HMS Firebrand was a fireship, previously a 16-gun sloop purchased in 1777 as HMS Porpoise. She was converted to a fireship, renamed HMS Firebrand in 1778, and was burnt in 1781.
- HMS Firebrand (1794) was a fireship purchased in 1794 and broken up in 1800.
- HMS Firebrand (1804a), was the French privateer brig Adèle, that Albatross captured in November 1800 and that became the British East India Company's armed brig Waller. The Royal Navy purchased her at London in August 1804 but she was wrecked in October.
- HMS Firebrand (1804b) was the mercantile Lord Lennox, a French prize taken in 1799 and renamed, that the Royal Navy purchased in 1804 for use as a fireship and sold in 1807.
- HMS Firebrand (1814) was an American gunboat captured at the Battle of Lake Borgne on 14 December 1814 and in service until at least 4 June 1815.
- HMS Firebrand (1831) was a wooden paddle vessel launched in 1831. She was rebuilt in 1834 and renamed HMS Black Eagle in 1843. She was broken up in 1876.
- HMS Firebrand (1842) was a wooden paddle frigate, ordered as HMS Belzebub, but renamed before being launched in 1842. In 1845 she was one of the Royal Navy vessels in the Anglo-French force at the Battle of Vuelta de Obligado. She also participated in the Crimean War. She was sold in 1864.
- HMS Firebrand (1877) was a composite screw gunboat launched in 1877. She was sold out of the service in 1905 and renamed Hoi Tin.
- HMS Firebrand (1906) was a tender, previously the War Department vessel Lord Heathfield. She was transferred to the Royal Navy in 1906 and was sold in 1920.
- HMS Firebrand was a sloop launched in 1894 as HMS Torch. She was given to the New Zealand government in 1917 as a training ship, and was renamed Firebrand. She was sold in 1920.

== See also ==
- The Canadian Armed Forces Maritime Command also operates a vessel named CFAV Firebrand.
