= West-Terschelling =

West-Terschelling West-Skylge
- Village
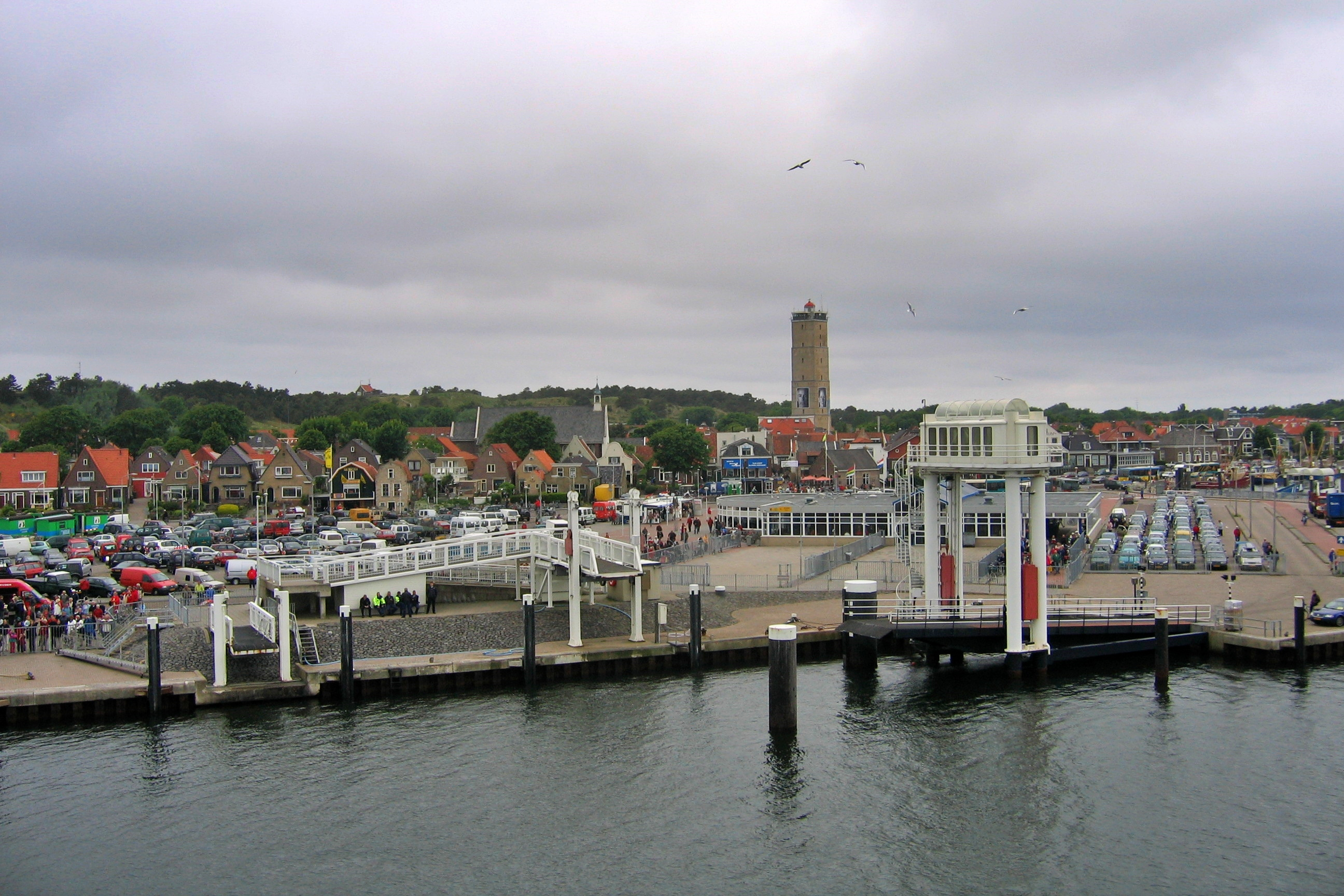
- View from the harbour

- Location of the village on Terschelling

- Location in the Netherlands
- Country: Netherlands
- Province: Friesland
- Municipality: Terschelling

Population (1 January 2017)
  - Total: 2,602
- Time zone: UTC+1 (CET)
  - Summer (DST): UTC+2 (CEST)
- Postal code: 8881
- Dialing code: 0562

West-Terschelling (West Frisian: West-Skylge) is the largest village on the island Terschelling, Friesland, in the central north of the Netherlands. It had a population of around 2,602 in January 2017.

The skyline of the village is dominated by the Brandaris lighthouse. The village was also named Sint Brandariusparochie, Sint-Brandariuskerke and just Brandaris in earlier centuries.

== History ==
The town was partially burned on the orders of Sir Robert Holmes in 1666, during the Second Anglo-Dutch War, in an event referred to as "Holmes's Bonfire".

A pub was named after the Oka 18, a ship that sank near Formerum.

== Museums and monuments ==
West Terschelling has 110 rijksmonuments.

There is a museum about the last voyage of Willem Barentsz, 't Behouden Huys.

== Gallery ==
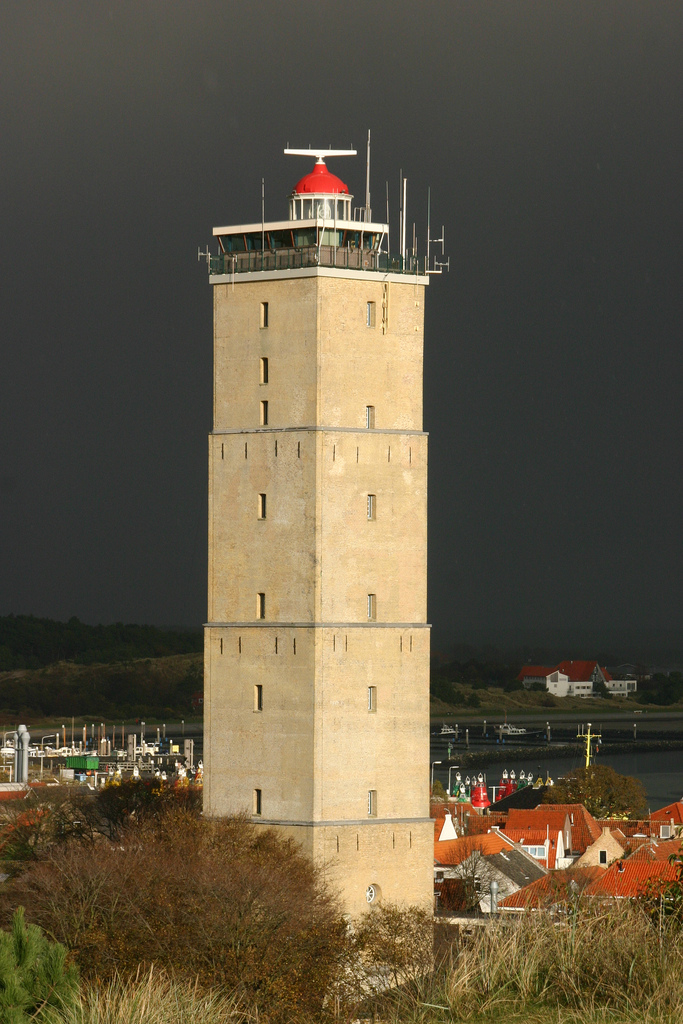
Brandaris lighthouse

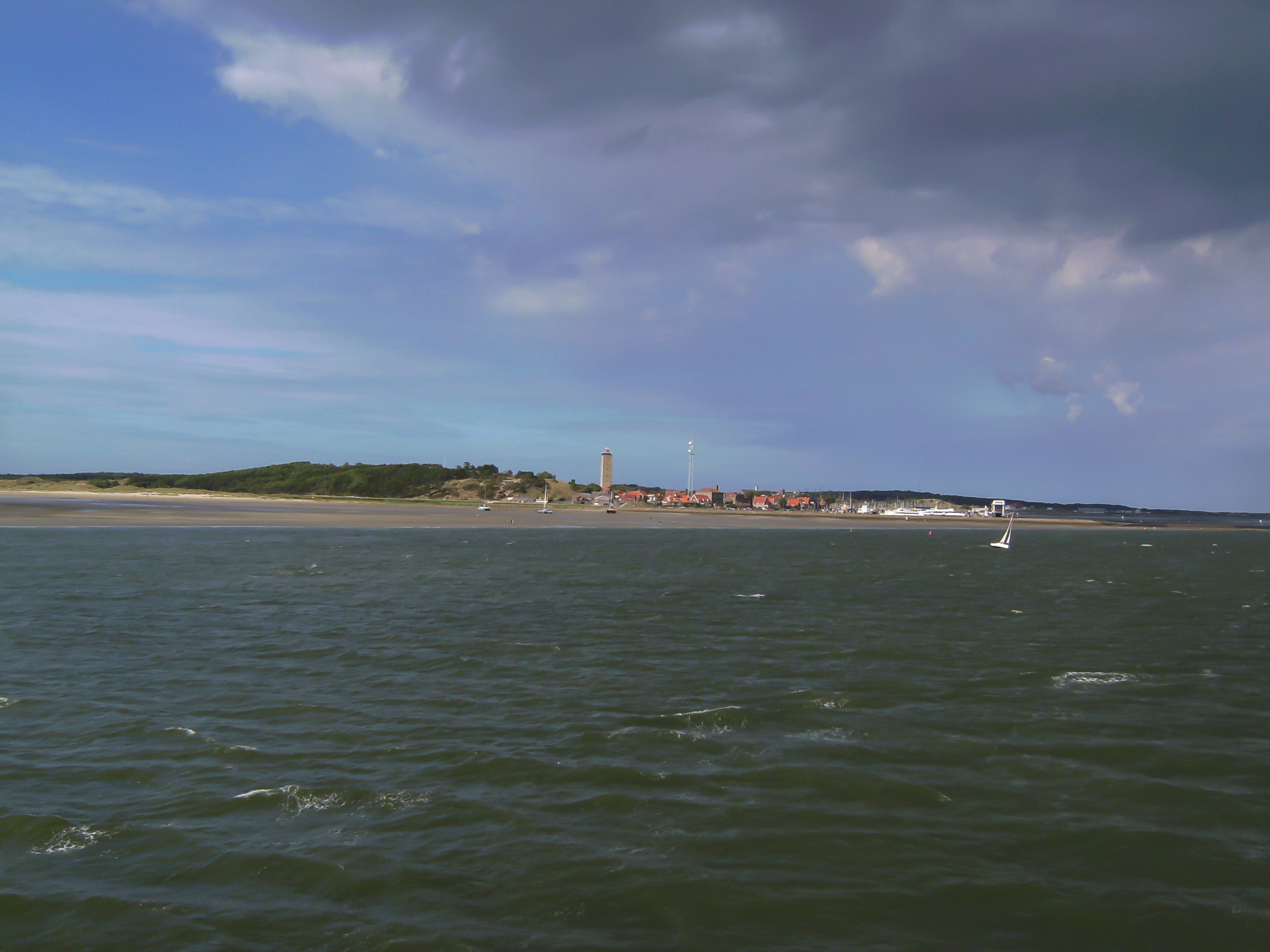
West-Terschelling, view facing the town (from far distance)

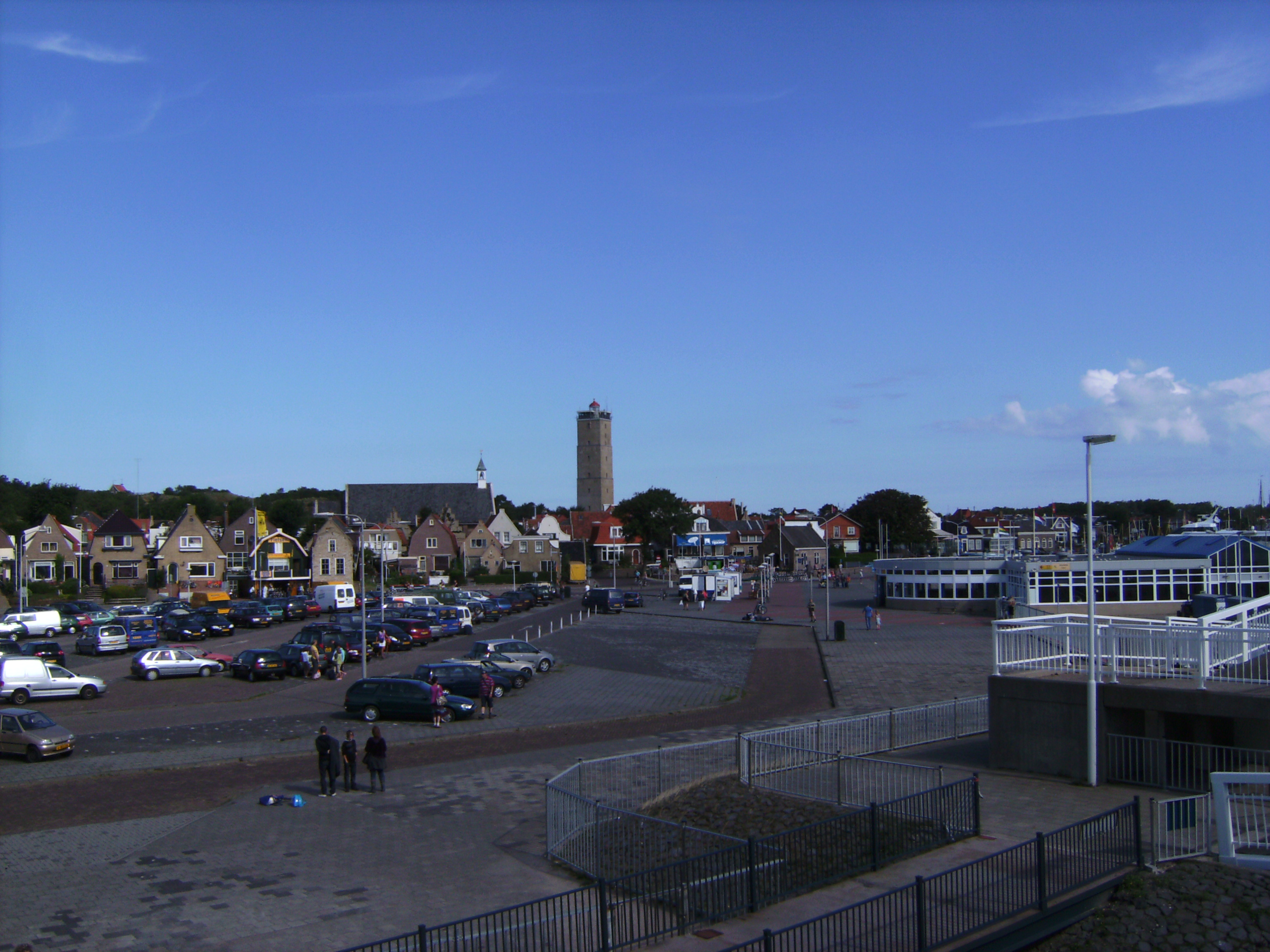
West-Terschelling, view facing the town (from the port)

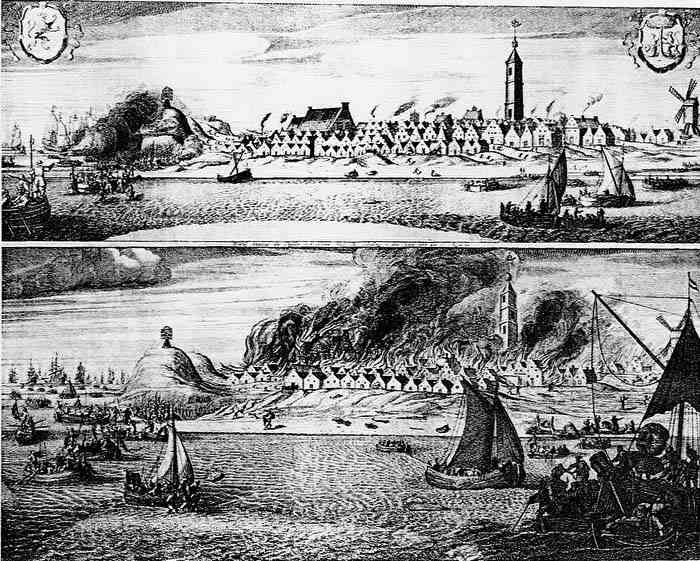
The town being burnt during Holmes's Bonfire

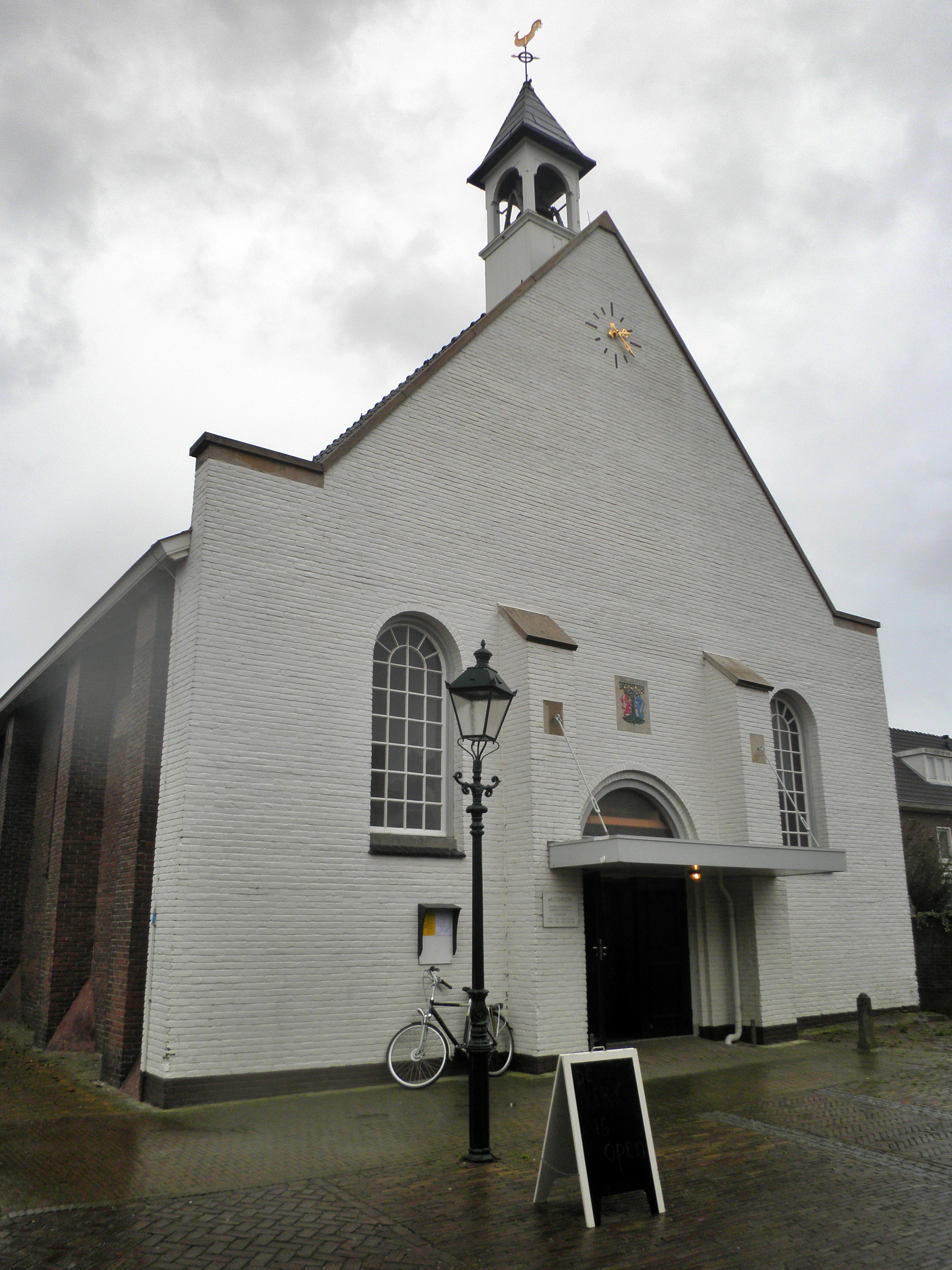
West Church

== Sources ==
- Municipality guide Terschelling 2005-2006
