= HMS Pluto (1756) =

1756-built fireship of the Royal Navy

History
- Name: New Concord
- Owner: M. Hutchinson
- Type: Mercantile

Kingdom of Great Britain
- Name: HMS Pluto
- Builder: Fitted at Deptford Dockyard
- Cost: £1,000 + £3,996.2.1d (fitting January–May 1757)
- Acquired: 31 December 1756
- Renamed: 17 March 1757
- Commissioned: 23 March 1757
- Fate: Sold on 23 December 1762

General characteristics
- Type: Fireship
- Tons burthen: 27048/94 bm
- Length: 86 ft 3 in (26.3 m) gundeck; 67 ft 10.375 in (20.7 m) keel for tonnage
- Beam: 27 ft 4.5 in (8.3 m)
- Depth of hold: 12 ft 4 in (3.8 m)
- Complement: 45 (100 as sloop)
- Armament: 8 × 6 lb (2.7 kg) guns (16 guns as sloop); 8 × 0.5 lb (0.23 kg) swivel guns

HMS Pluto was an 8-gun fireship of the Royal Navy, originally built as the mercantile vessel New Concord. The Navy purchased the ship in December 1756 and fitted her for service during the Seven Years' War. She took part in the Raid on Rochefort and the Battle of Quiberon Bay before being sold in 1762.

== Construction and purchase ==
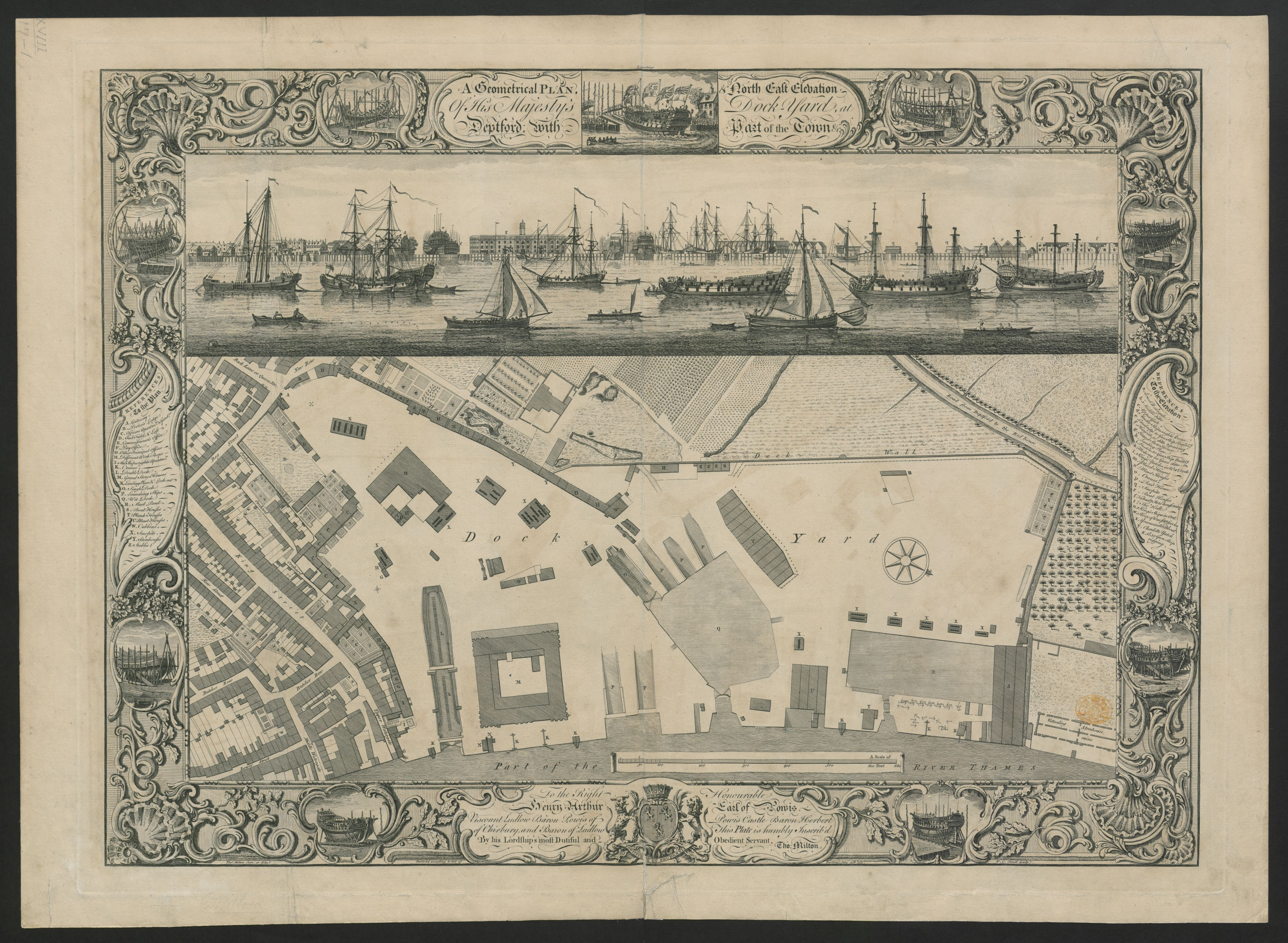
Deptford Dockyard, where Pluto was fitted out between January and May 1757.

New Concord was purchased on 31 December 1756 from a Mr. Hutchinson for £1,000 (equivalent to £188,016 in 2025). She measured 86 feet 3 inches (26.3 m) on the gundeck and 67 feet 10.375 inches (20.7 m) along the keel for tonnage, with a beam of 27 feet 4.5 inches (8.3 m) and a depth of hold of 12 feet 4 inches (3.8 m). Her burthen was 270 48/94 tons Builder's Measurement. She was fitted out as a fireship at Deptford Dockyard between January and May 1757 at a cost of £3,996 (equivalent to £620,131 in 2025). She was initially armed with eight 6-pounder guns, which were increased to sixteen when fitted as a sloop, along with eight half-pounder swivel guns. Her complement was about 45 men, increasing to 100 when fitted as a sloop.

== Service ==
Renamed Pluto by the Admiralty on 17 March 1757, she was first commissioned on 23 March under Commander John Bover, who was transferred to HMS Raven on 28 March. Commander John Lindsay was appointed on 4 April and came aboard on 11 April for cruising duties. In September, she was placed under Commander James Hume and took part in the Raid on Rochefort. On 7 April 1758, with HMS Essex and Proserpine, she attacked a French convoy in the Bay of Biscay, capturing the 22-gun La Galatée, a privateer Le Rostan, and a transport. Hume was killed in the action against a French corsair.

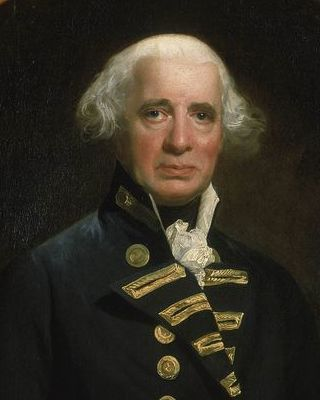
Admiral Richard Howe, under whom Pluto served during the 1758 coastal operations.

In April 1758, she came under Commander James Johnston, serving with Admiral Richard Howe's squadron in the attacks on Saint-Malo, Cherbourg, and the Battle of Saint-Cast later that year. She was fitted to receive men, and later refitted as a fireship again at Portsmouth in 1759.

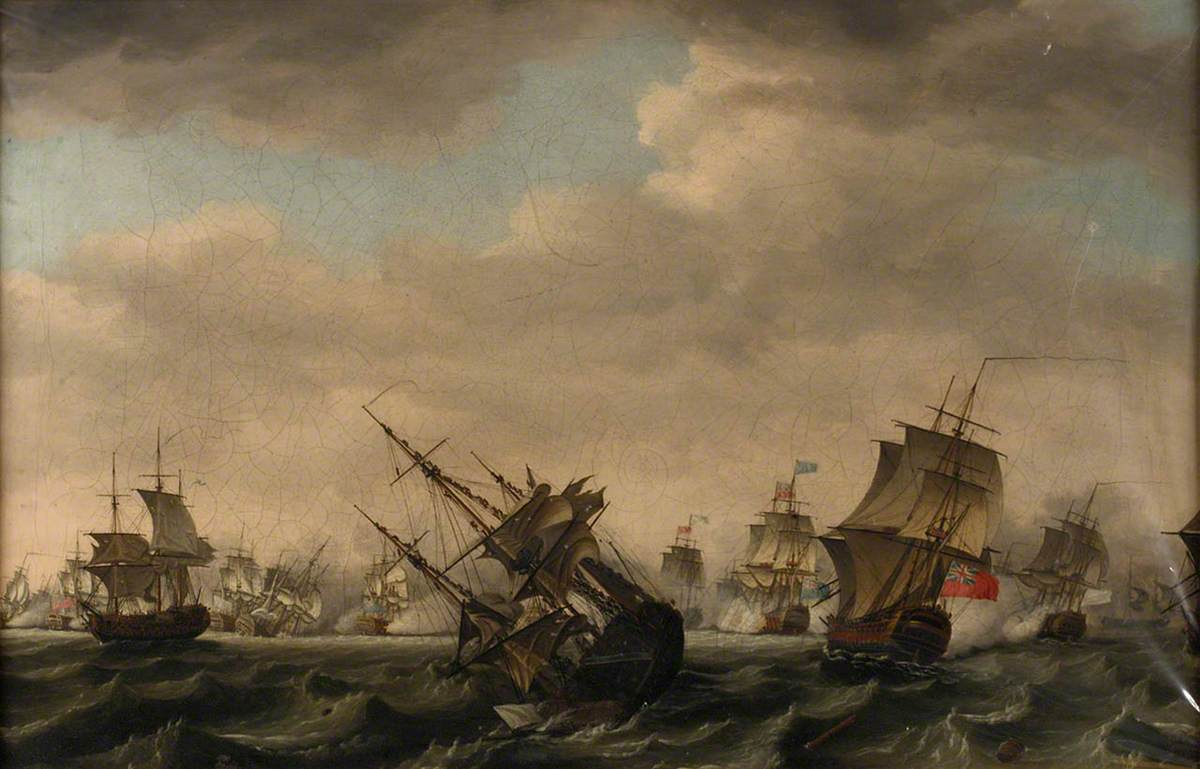
Pluto participated in the Battle of Quiberon Bay, depicted here in a painting by Francis Swaine.

In June, she was commanded temporarily by Lieutenant Robert Taylor in the Western Squadron and took part in the Battle of Quiberon Bay on 20 November 1759.

In November 1761, she came under Commander William Allen. Pluto was sold at Portsmouth on 23 December 1762 for £1,305 (equivalent to £231,978 in 2025).
