= HMS Friendship =

Six ships of the Royal Navy have borne the name HMS Friendship:

- HMS Friendship (1673), a fireship purchased in 1673 and sunk in action in the same year.
- HMS Friendship (1763), a 4-gun cutter, purchased in 1763 and sold eight years later.
- HMS Friendship (1794), a fireship purchased in 1794 and broken up in 1801.
- HMS Friendship (1795): the Royal Navy purchased two vessels in 1795, both were gunboats armed with 2–3 guns, named HMS Friendship. Both were lost in November 1801. The parallels in names and dates has resulted in the two vessels, and their fates, probably being conflated. Friendship #1 was wrecked at Plymouth on 9 November 1801, and Friendship #2 was wrecked on the coast of France on 2 November 1801.
- HMS Friendship (J398), an Algerine-class minesweeper provided to the Royal Navy in 1942 under the Lend-Lease scheme and returned to the United States Navy in 1947.
