= Olive Branch (1788 ship) =

History

Great Britain
- Name: Olive Branch
- Builder: North America
- Launched: 1777
- Acquired: c.1788
- Fate: Last listed 1793

General characteristics
- Tons burthen: 96, or 110 (bm)

Olive Branch was launched in 1777 in America, possibly under a different name. In 1788–1789 she made one voyage as a whaler in the British Southern Whale Fishery. On her return she traded with Gibraltar and the Mediterranean. She was last listed in 1793.

== Career ==
On 14 January 1788 Olive Branch, Crow, master, sailed from the Downs, bound for the Brazils. On 3 February she sailed from Cowes for the Southern Fishery.

On 4 December 1788 Olive Branch was at 49°17′N 15°00′W. She was coming from the Brazils, having been at the Cape three weeks earlier. She was leaky but not in need of anything. On 24 April 1789 she arrived at Gravesend from Lisbon. She had put into Lisbon in January on her way back from the South Seas. Olive Branch returned with 50 tuns of whale oil and 30 cwt of whale bone.

Olive Branch first appeared in Lloyd's Register (LR) in 1789. (The volume for 1788 is not available online, if it exists, and Olive Branch did not appear in the 1787 volume.) LR showed Olive Branch's master as W. Lucas, and her trade as London–Southern Fishery. However, there is no evidence in the Lloyd's List ship arrival and departure (SAD) data of any such voyage. Instead, Captain Lucas was master of Mentor, sailing her on a whaling voyage.

The 1790 volume showed Olive Branch's master changing to Clark, and her trade to London–Gibraltar. On 15 April 1790 she sailed from Gravesend for Gibraltar; by May she was reported to be at Gibraltar. By 14 August she was at Terravecchia.

Year	Master	Owner	Trade	Source & notes
1789	W.Lucas	Oliver & Co.	London–Southern Fishery	LR; good repair 1785

On 4 August 1789, the snow Olive Branch, of "One Hundred Tons or thereabouts", lying at Mr. Oliver's dock at Warping Will was offered for sale by auction at Lloyd's Coffee House, pursuant to a decree by the High Court of Admiralty.

Year	Master	Owner	Trade	Source & notes
1790	W.Lucas; J.Clark	Oliver & Co. J.F_nt	London–Southern Fishery; London–Gibraltar	LR; good repair 1785
1791	J.Clark; R.Craigie	J.Flint; J.Duffeld	London–Gibraltar	LR; good repair 1785 and repair 1789
1792	R.Craigie	J.Dueffel	Bristol–London	LR; good repair 1785 and repair 1789
1793	R.Craigie	J.Dueffel	Bristol–London	LR; good repair 1785 and repair 1789

== Fate ==
Olive Branch was last listed in 1793.

It is possible that the Admiralty purchased her for use as the fire ship HMS Olive Branch, of 103 tons (bm).
