= Holmes's Bonfire =

1666 naval raid during the Second Anglo-Dutch War

- Part of the Second Anglo-Dutch War
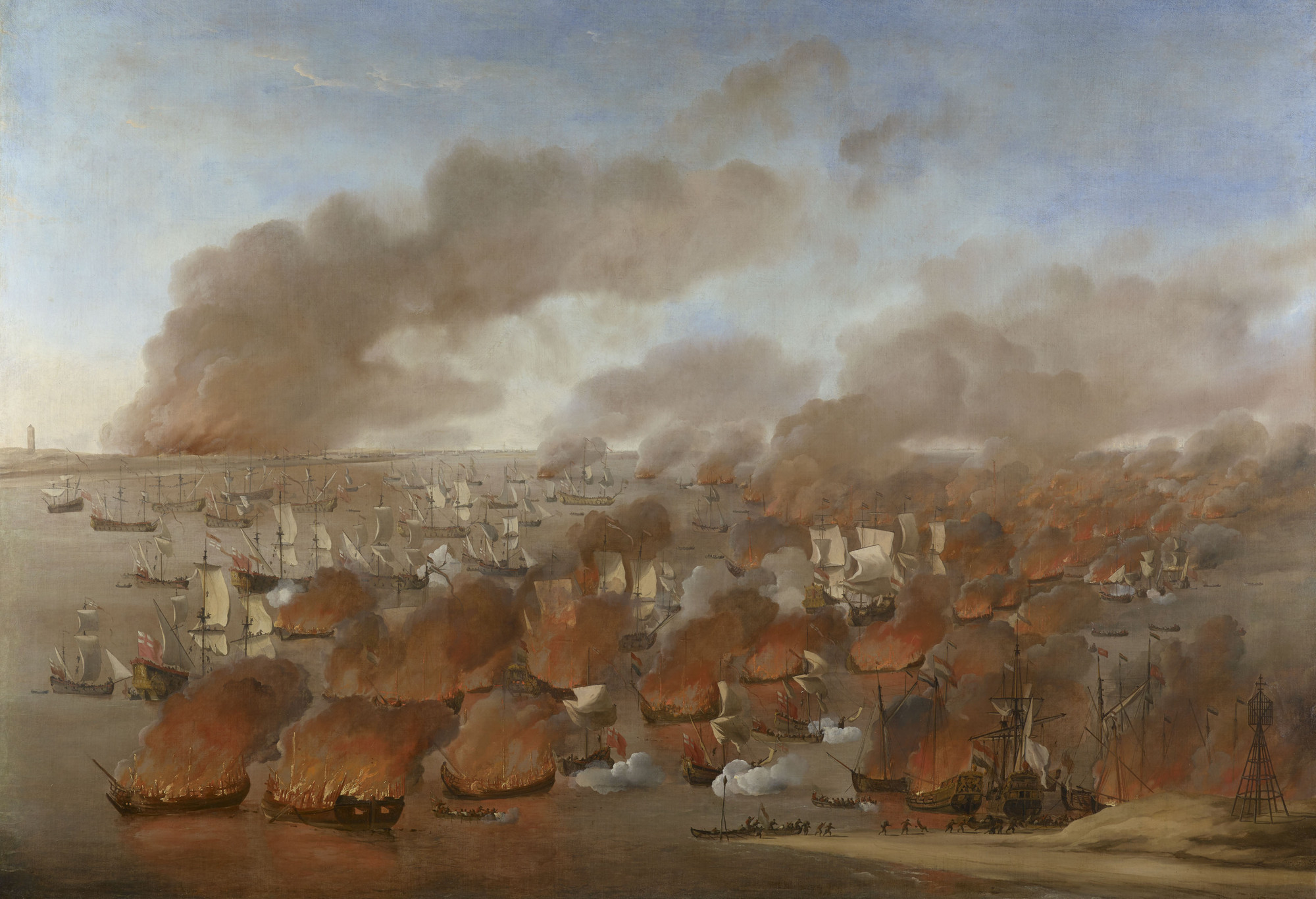
- 'Holmes's Bonfire' by Willem van de Velde the Elder
Date	19–20 August 1666
Location	Near West-Terschelling, in the provinces of Friesland and Holland of the Dutch Republic 53°21′39″N 5°12′56″E
Result	English victory

Belligerents
England	Dutch Republic

Commanders and leaders
Robert Holmes	

Strength
8 ships	2 ships 150 merchant vessels

Casualties and losses
6 killed 24 wounded	2 ships destroyed 140 merchant vessels destroyed

Holmes's Bonfire was a raid on the Vlie estuary in the Netherlands, executed by the English Fleet during the Second Anglo-Dutch War on 19 and 20 August 1666 New Style (9 and 10 August Old Style). The attack, named after the commander of the landing force, Rear-Admiral Robert Holmes, was successful in destroying by fire a large merchant fleet of 140 ships. During the same action, the town of West-Terschelling was burnt down, which caused outrage in the Dutch Republic.

== Background ==
After its victory in the St James's Day Fight on 4 and 5 August 1666 (Gregorian calendar, 25 and 26 July Julian Calendar), the English Fleet controlled the North Sea. The Dutch fleet, though having lost only two ships, was severely damaged and would for some weeks be unable to challenge the English fleet. The joint fleet commanders, George Monck, 1st Duke of Albemarle and Prince Rupert of the Rhine, on 7 August discussed how best to exploit this situation. The most advantageous course of action, initiating a permanent blockade of the Dutch coast and thus preventing the Dutch fleet from leaving port, was precluded by the fact that the supply situation of the English fleet was very poor, due to the structural lack of sufficient funding. It was to be expected that the English fleet would be forced to return to the home ports, even before the Dutch fleet was repaired. To accomplish anything of importance during the limited time period available, a much more aggressive undertaking than a mere blockade was indicated: to attack one of the Dutch ports.

The most attractive Dutch targets were however also the most dangerous. In the south, the port of Rotterdam was too far inland and the naval ports of Flushing and Hellevoetsluis too heavily defended. More to the north, the vast wealth of the city of Amsterdam could only be reached by recklessly entering the Zuyderzee past most of the still active vessels of the Dutch fleet, lying in wait in the Texel. Because of these dangers, there would be no English attempts on these ports until Napoleonic times. But one lesser target was more exposed. The naval port of the Admiralty of Friesland, Harlingen, lies at the southern edge of the Waddenzee, the vast stretch of mudflats between the Frisian Isles and the continental coast. Harlingen's exit to the North Sea, located 20 miles (32 km) to the northwest, is the Vlie, the ancient estuary of the IJssel river, between the islands of Vlieland and Terschelling. The channel was often used as moorage and it was, correctly, assumed that a large number of merchant ships were at anchor here, sheltering from the English fleet and waiting to resume their voyage to the Baltic, each year the destination of thousands of Dutch vessels. In 2016, research showed that many ships in the Vlie were destined for Arkhangelsk, while there were also some forty to fifty westvaarders present, ships hoping to sail for France, Spain or Portugal.

The shoals, at this point even more dangerous than usual at the Dutch coast, were generally considered sufficient protection against any enemy attack. However, the English had the advantage of being aided by a Dutch captain, Laurens Heemskerck, known to the English as "Lauris van Hamskirck", who had fled from the Netherlands in 1665 on account of the cowardice he had shown during the Battle of Lowestoft and was afterwards condemned in absentia to perpetual banishment. Heemskerck in 1666 suggested executing a raid on the Vlie and later, in 1672, fought on the French side against his countrymen at the Battle of Solebay. On the 7th Heemskerck was sent out on Little Mary, a sixth-rate vessel of 12 cannon, to reconnoitre the coast together with Rupert's private yacht Fan Fan, returning the evening of the next day. A sweep along the coast by a frigate squadron during the following week brought only few prizes. When the English fleet, sailing along the Dutch coast from the south, anchored in front of the Texel on 16 August, during a council of war Heemskerck convinced Rupert and Monck that an attack was feasible as "(...) the islands of Vlie and Schelling were very ill guarded, notwithstanding there were Store-houses both for the States, and the East-India Fleet, and Riches to a good value".

As the English had no special marine units, a makeshift force was assembled for the landing which consisted of 300 men from each of the three squadrons of the fleet, two thirds of them sailors, one third sea soldiers. Eight frigates were dedicated: Advice (of 46 cannon), Hampshire (40), Tyger (40), Dragon (40), Assurance (36), Sweepstake (36), Garland (28) and Pembroke (28). To this force were added five fireships (Bryar, Richard, Lizard, Fox and Samuel) and seven ketches. Also, thirty-six sloops were made available. The Rear-Admiral of the Red, Robert Holmes, was given command of the expedition; the landing force was divided into nine companies of a hundred men, each consisting of seventy musketeers and thirty pikemen and headed by a captain; Sir Phillip Howard would command an additional 120 volunteers, mostly noblemen who, due to their station, could not honourably serve under a commoner. Holmes kept some men apart for personal protection and thus speaks of eleven companies.

Holmes's orders were to put the main emphasis on plundering the islands. He himself was to land on Vlieland with a force of five hundred men; if possible a simultaneous attack by the remaining four hundred men under Sir William Jennens should be carried out on Terschelling. Dutch shipping was but a secondary target: "You are to seize what vessels you finde in the Harbour, which you are to make use of in bringing away the Booty: what are not servicable you are to sink or Burn". The common people among the local population should be spared: "that no violence be done to women or children, nor the inferior sort of people, unless in case of resistance".

While the main fleet remained at anchor along the coast of Texel island, Holmes on 18 August (8 August Old Style) sailed towards the Vlie, being joined that day by Prince Rupert's yacht Fanfan. Because he was unable to immediately enter the Vlie anyway because of a contrary southeasterly wind, he sent a ketch to sound the Westerboomsgat, in that period the main Vlie channel, running from west to east towards the land head of Terschelling. Today the situation has changed considerably: the channel has shifted four miles to the southwest, eroding the north coast of Vlieland and causing Terschelling to grow in the same direction.

== The raid ==
=== First day ===
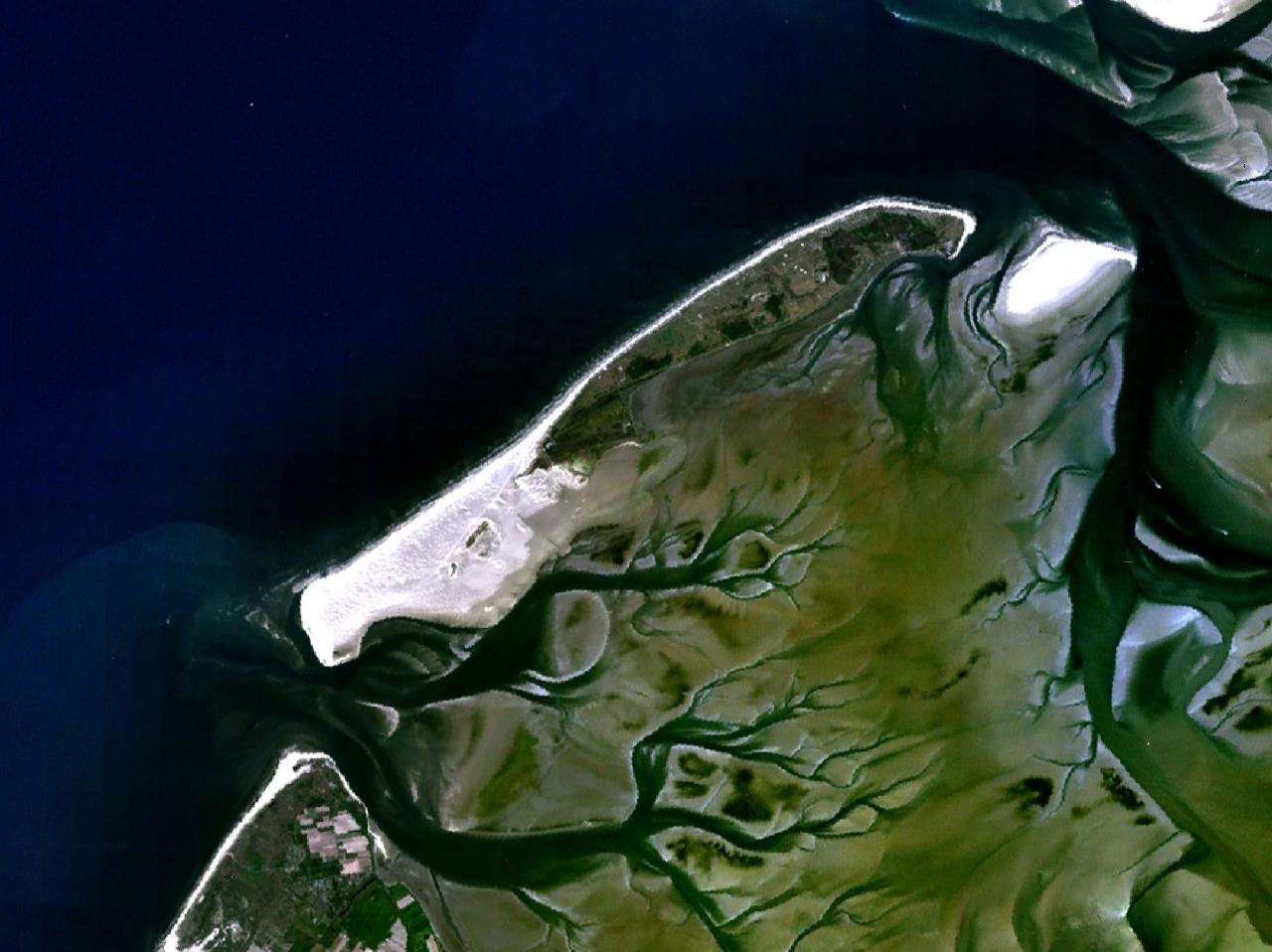
Satellite image of Vlieland, with the Vlie estuary to the north; despite it being flood tide, the mudflats are visible below the water surface

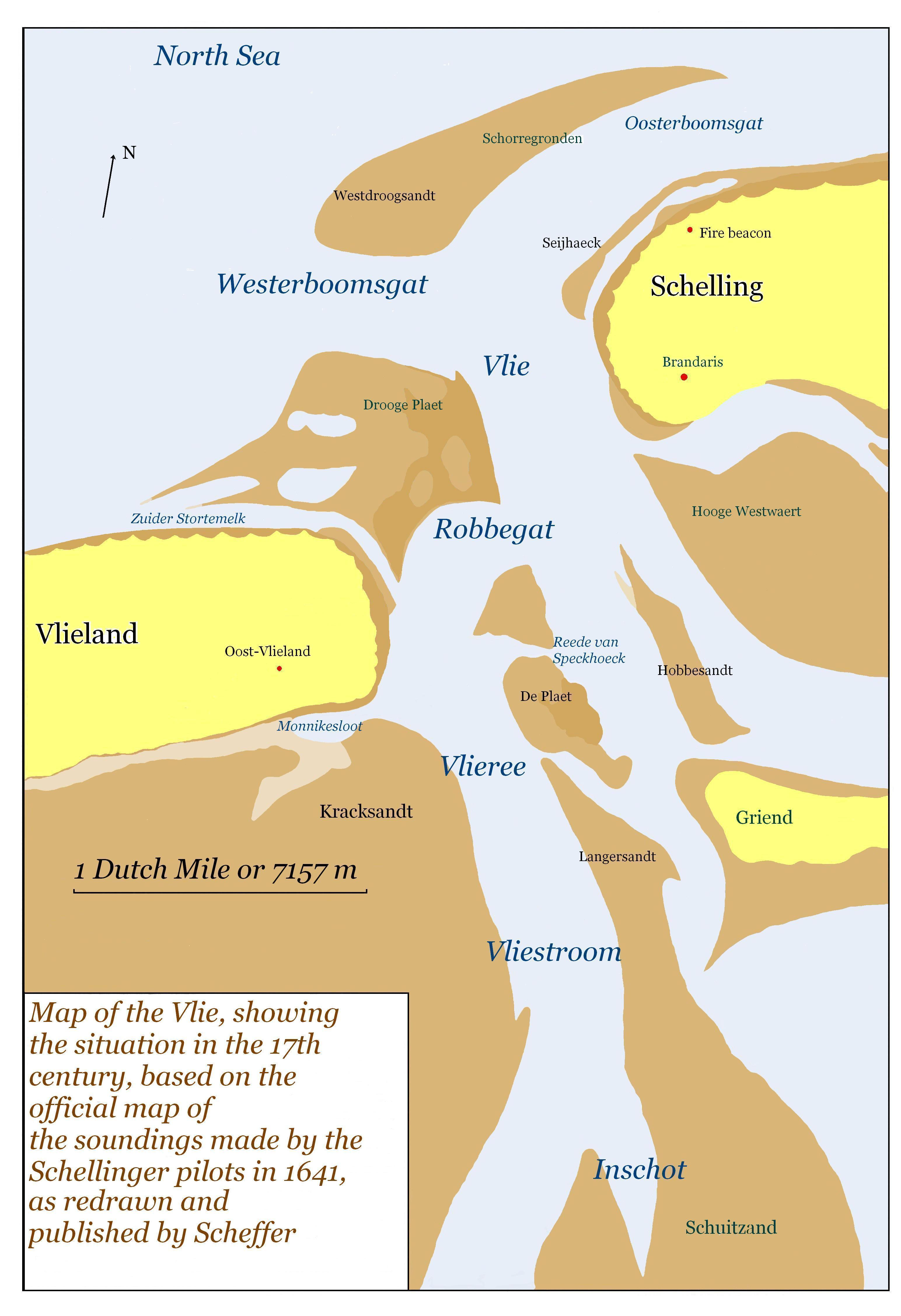
Map of the Vlie area as it was in the 17th century; the present situation is markedly different

Holmes on Thursday 19 August, the adverse southeasterly having eased to a breeze, around 8:00 AM entered the Vlie, using Tyger as his flagship and leaving Hampshire and Advice behind as a covering force. Normally the shifting shoals would have made an approach very difficult but Holmes had a stroke of luck. On the 17th the Garland had taken a Danish merchantman with a Dutch pilot on board who Holmes found more capable than Heemskerck, whose knowledge of the shoals Holmes found to have been very exaggerated; it also transpired that part of the buoyage had not been removed; this had been ordered by the Admiralty of Amsterdam but on the 18th the English were already so close that the official 'buoy man' had not dared to complete the job. Also the Admiralty had some days before ordered all ships to return to the home port, at a penalty of six guilders per day, but almost none had complied; most ship-owners had explicitly given orders to stay, to be able to sail immediately at the end of the English blockade. Holmes and his new-found pilot personally reconnoitred the channel in the Fanfan, and discovered that a large merchant fleet was indeed present, estimated at fifty vessels. Ultimately, Holmes found a fleet of about 140 merchantmen or smaller vessels at anchor—by himself estimated at about 150 to 160—guarded by two light frigates, the Vollenhove commanded by Captain Adelaer and the Middelhoven under Captain Van Toll. The crews of the ships were very confident of their ability to repulse an attack and many villagers from the islands had even brought their possessions aboard, assuming these to be more safe there than on land, where they expected the brunt of the English attack would be directed.

Indeed, Holmes had been ordered to give priority to the shore installations on Vlieland. However, when his Tyger as first ship arrived at the Reede van Speckhoeck anchorage (Whalers' Moorage or Schelling Road), west of the Hobbesandt shoal, to his puzzlement he saw only a tiny village, Oost-Vlieland, on this island and interrogation of some prisoners confirmed that no important buildings were present there. Meanwhile, behind him Garland and Dragon, with difficulty beating up the wind on a tacking course through the Westerboomsgat, had grounded; Dragon would only be able to free herself by throwing eight of her cannon overboard and the beer supply. In these circumstances Holmes considered it unwise to commit his landing force, covered by only a handful of frigates, to an attack on what basically was an empty dune area, while expecting the enormous merchant fleet with thousands of sailors to remain passive to his south in the Vlieree (Vlie Road) while this was going on. He therefore decided to attack this fleet first. According to some, Holmes was also specially inspired by the opportunity to damage the Dutch economy. He would later justify his initiative by claiming that he lacked the landing capacity to attack Vlieland because all ketches had grounded.

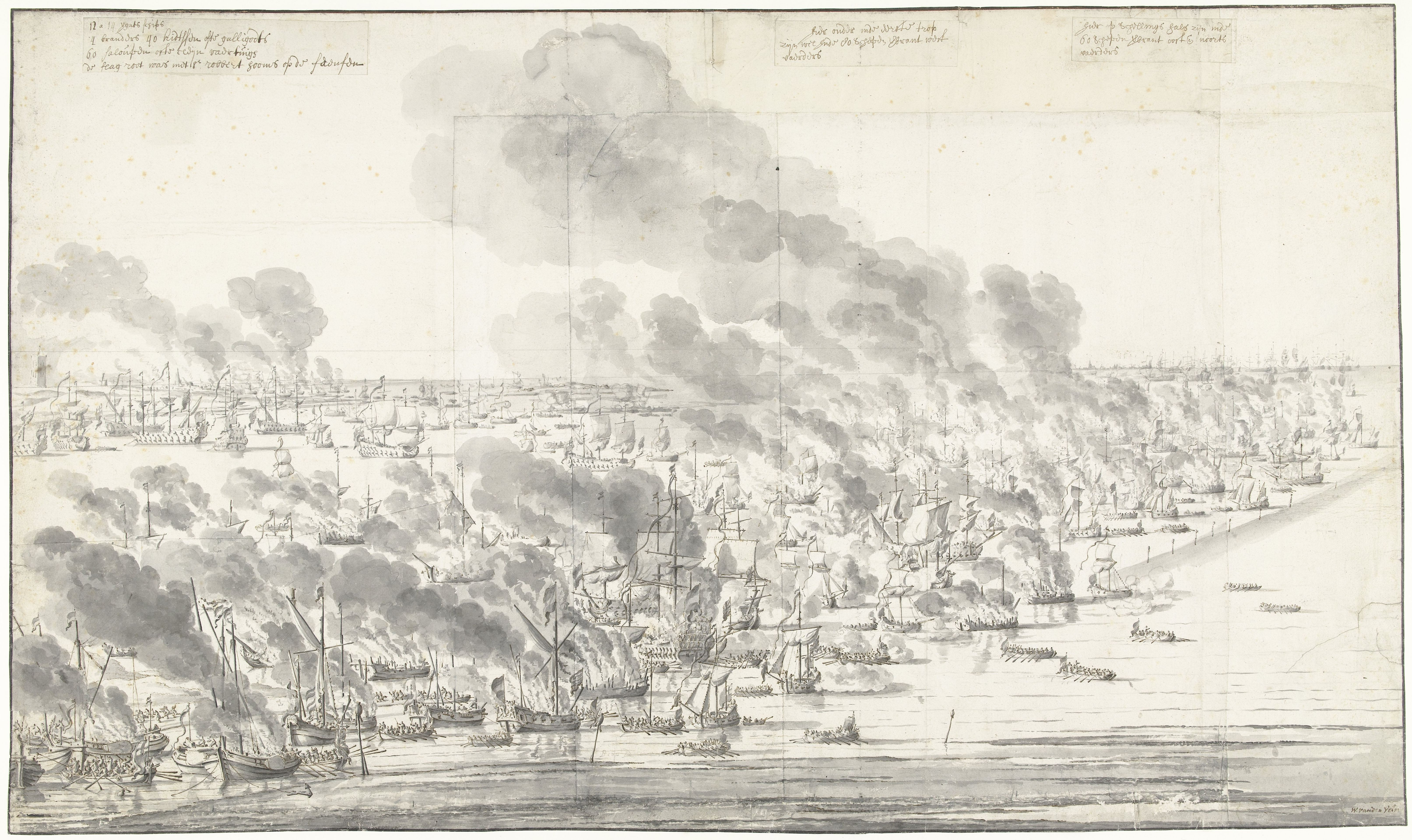
Robert Holmes sets fire to the Dutch fleet at Terschelling, 19 August, by Willem van de Velde

Holmes didn't dare to venture any further with his frigates—he was at his position almost enclosed by shoals—so, with the exception of the shallow-draughted Pembroke, the assault was carried out around 13:00 by the five fireships, sailing somewhat to the north into the Robbegat channel, the entrance of the Vliestroom, where most of the merchant fleet stretched out from north to south over a distance of ten miles. Their success was complete. On their approach three large armed merchantmen, commanded to assist the guard ships, lost courage and fled. The first fireship managed to set the attacking Dutch frigate Vollenhove alight, most of the Dutch crew, among them Adelaer, drowning when their fleeing sloop capsized; when the next approached Middelhoven, the crew of the latter abandoned ship, rowing away in some sloops. This second fireship grounded however; seeing this the Dutch crew of a sloop turned; then the English fireship crew also entered a sloop, both sloops racing to be the first to reach Middelhoven. The English won and set the Dutch warship on fire. The other three fireships now attached themselves to an equal number of large Dutch merchantmen on the northern edge of the fleet and burnt them, causing a mass panic on the other vessels, the sailors of which mostly abandoned their ships, escaping to the south in the boats.

Seeing the confusion on the Dutch side, Holmes decided to immediately exploit this opportunity. Every available sloop—Dutch sources indicate a number of 22—was manned with demolition teams of a dozen men each to set fire to any vessel they could reach, not wasting any time plundering. Soon even the Dutch ships whose crews held firm were surrounded by burning vessels and forced to leave their position. Fleeing ships entangled and became easy victims, as the southeasterly wind drove them towards their attackers. During the following hours the ships one after another became victim of the fire until the last remaining nine were saved when a large Guineaman and some armed ketches stood and fought and thus managed to protect some other vessels behind them in a cul-de-sac formed by the Inschot creek. The action ended around 20:00. About 130 ships were destroyed; according to Holmes himself, eleven ships in total escaped. Not all of these 130 were major vessels; the destruction of only 114 merchantmen and warships can be accounted for in the Dutch archives. Among the losses were two Hollandic transports carrying five hundred cannon imported from Sweden. Almost all sailors saved themselves, most rowing in sloops to Harlingen and some walking or wading over the Kracksant shoal to Vlieland. The English were not keen on taking many prisoners as—to their great embarrassment—they lacked the funds to feed even those they had taken in previous battles. However, in 2013 Anne Doedens accepted the number of two thousand deaths mentioned in a letter by French ambassador in the Netherlands d'Estrades. The same number was mentioned by William Coventry in a letter to Ormonde on 18/28 August 1666.

Directly south of Vlieland, some ships had in vain sought cover in the Monnickensloot creek behind the fifty years old gun boat Adelaar of the Amsterdam Admiralty, which had been used as a permanent guard ship for the Vlie since 1652 and was armed with twelve cannon, all three-pounders. Its captain, Oostwoud, fled in a sloop to the west. The English set fire to the gun boat, but shortly afterwards quenched it again, taking possession of the vessel together with some pilot boats. The Adelaar was later given to Heemskerck as a reward.

Meanwhile, the civil militia of Vlieland, standing on its eastern land head, had at first, assisted by a thunderstorm, deterred any attempts by small English landing parties and prevented a peat boat being reached by demolition sloops. But, seeing the conflagration, they lost courage and fled with most of the population, some using small vessels, others walking towards Texel. On their way south they encountered two deputies of the States of Holland, Gerard Hasselaer and Baerding, who had been committed to supervise the fleet at the Texel and hearing of the English threat had travelled to the more northern island to investigate. They managed to encourage the men and reassemble a force on the land head and then returned to the Texel, promising to send a company of soldiers as reinforcement.

The smoke and flames were clearly visible to the English fleet before the Texel, twenty miles to the south, and interpreted as a sure sign that Holmes had succeeded in burning the warehouses. Accordingly, Rupert and Albemarle sent him a congratulatory letter ordering his immediate withdrawal as the enemy too had no doubt been alerted.

=== Second day ===
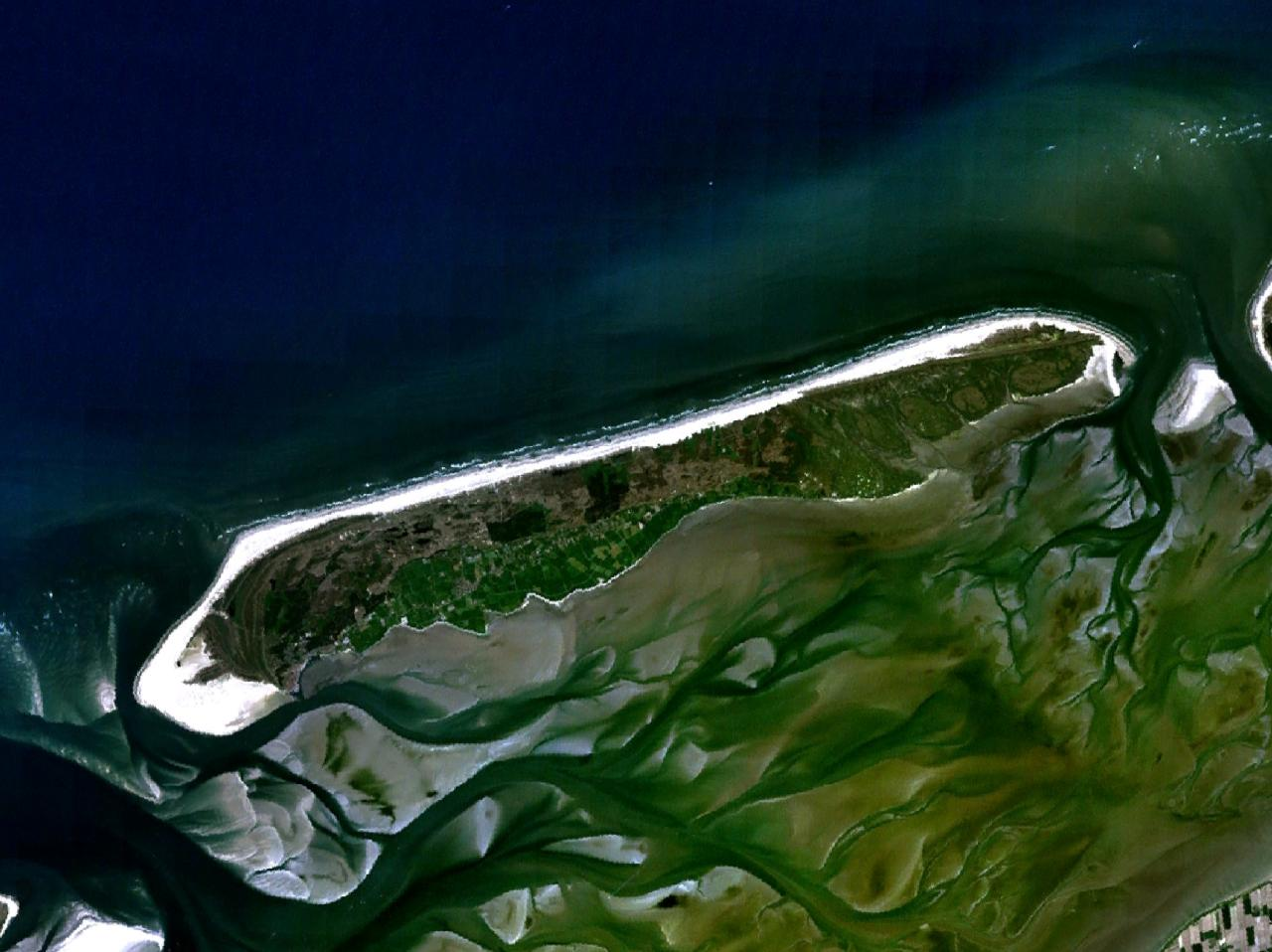
Satellite image of Terschelling. The broad white beach visible at the western tip of the island, the former Noordvaarder sandbank, did not exist in the 17th century; Holmes's approach route into the Vlie today crosses solid land

Holmes in the evening of 19 August became aware he had been misinformed; the main shore installations were on the opposite island, Terschelling, in this period called simply Schelling. On its western point was a town, then bearing the prosaic name of 'ter Schelling' ("at Schelling"), that today is called West-Terschelling and which the English then knew as Brandaris after the tall mediaeval lighthouse of the same name, a very distinctive landmark. Terschelling was the main home base of the Dutch whaling industry and there were warehouses, some connected to this trade, others belonging to the Dutch East India Company. The town was wealthy, consisting of about 400 stone houses, but unwalled. Much of the population consisted of pacifist Mennonites, and many retired whalers had also settled there.

At 05:00 am on 20 August, Holmes ordered his forces to attack the town, himself taking the lead in Fan-Fan. A few armed men opposed the landing with musket fire but were soon scared away when six English companies came ashore—though Holmes's personal report gives the impression that all of his troops were committed. Holmes left one company to guard the landing site and let the other five march in close formation to the edge of the town. Scouts, spreading out in all directions, soon reported that the population had fled, some to more eastern villages, others on any vessel they could find; three companies now entered to plunder and burn the town, while Holmes with two hundred men remained on the outside to the south. Some very old inhabitants had not fled and were, according to the English accounts, treated with all possible respect.

At that moment a high tide occurred, which would greatly facilitate the exit of his frigates from the Vlie. Holmes therefore decided not to burn the eastern villages, to remove his troops from Terschelling, quickly execute a short landing at Vlieland in conformation with his original orders, and retreat before any Dutch counterattack could materialise. After the warehouses had been burnt and perceiving that the troops were more interested in looting than destroying the town, he ordered also that a few houses on the east side should be set on fire. This way he could force his men to stop plundering, preventing them from lingering too long and missing the favourable tide. It had been a very dry summer and within hours almost the entire town burnt down: only about thirty houses, the town hall, the Dutch Reformed church and the Brandaris lighthouse were spared by the flames. The English troops mostly retreated in good order; to urge them to greater haste Holmes even ordered them to be fired on. One ketch was left behind to pick up possible stragglers, and late in the afternoon it indeed saw some men carrying loot; while the ketch sent a sloop, suddenly six (according to English sources; Dutch accounts speak of three) pursuing Schellingers appeared who beat one plunderer to death and took the other, severely wounded, prisoner, sending him to Harlingen. A third, belonging to the same group, had earlier been stabbed to death by them with a pitchfork.

When arriving on Tyger Holmes learned that Rupert had ordered an immediate retreat, so he decided to forego a last attack on Vlieland; unknown to him the first Dutch reinforcements had already arrived preparing to place two gun batteries, so his decision prevented a contested landing. Accompanying the Dutch troops was the famous naval painter Willem van de Velde the Elder, who would make sketches of the site, that he and his son Willem van de Velde the Younger would develop into some dramatic paintings. Engravings made of the paintings, with explanatory notes, are an important additional source of information for modern historians.

== Aftermath ==
On 21 August (11 August Old Style), Holmes returned to the main fleet and could report, using Howard as messenger, to Monck that he had destroyed "about 150 ships", captured the old flyboat Adelaar of twelve cannon and destroyed ter Schelling, all of this at a cost of half a dozen dead, an equal number wounded, and a single sloop—and despite being rather ill throughout the operation, perhaps from a malaria attack. A day earlier, the secretary of prince Rupert James Hayes, using the Julian calendar, had already written to England: "On the 9th, at noon, smoke was seen rising from several places in the island of Vlie, and the 10th brought news that Sir Robert had burned in the enemy's harbour 160 outward-bound valuable merchantmen and three men-of-war, and taken a little pleasure boat and eight guns in four hours. The loss is computed at a million sterling, and will make great confusion when the people see themselves in the power of the English at their very doors. Sir Robert then landed his forces, and is burning the houses in Vlie and Schelling as bonfires for his good success at sea", thus being the first to use the word "bonfire" for this event, which soon became very common. Charles II of England ordered bonfires to be lit in celebration of the victory, as was usual. A poem thus expressed the boisterous elation felt by the English, that their victory in the naval fight was so soon followed by this success:

Where are those boasting boors, what are their names?
That swore they blockt us up i'th River Thames
Brave, were it done: I must confess the Hogan
Was very willing, but wanted Mogan
Our streets were thick with bonfires large and tall
But Holmes one bonfire made, was worth'em all
Well done Sir Robert, bravely done I swear,
Whilst we made bonfires here, you made'em there

Much of the credit however, was given to Heemskerck.

After the defeat in the St James's Day Fight political tensions in the Dutch Republic had strongly increased, with the loyal servant of the States regime, Lieutenant-Admiral Michiel de Ruyter, accusing the champion of the rivaling Orangist faction, Lieutenant-Admiral Cornelis Tromp, of having abandoned the main body of the Dutch fleet to seek his personal glory. On 21 August the news of a second catastrophe at the Vlie caused rioting in Amsterdam, where the stock market collapsed; an angry Orangist mob tried to plunder the house of De Ruyter. Commentators in England predicted the fall of the leader of the States faction, Grand Pensionary Johan de Witt, expecting him to flee to France.

De Witt however, deftly exploited the situation to his advantage. Having arrested on 19 August the main English contact with the Orangists, Henri Buat, he soon produced convincing evidence that the Orangists had collaborated with the enemy. The outrage this caused was then directed by him to the humanitarian aspects of the raid and away from the fact that a fleet worth two million guilders had been lost. In this he was aided by the reaction of the Dutch population to the destruction of Terschelling. Whereas in the English Channel and the Irish Sea it would well into the 18th century remain common to raid villages of other nations, even in peacetime, the English and Dutch had gradually stopped attacking each other's coastal settlements around the middle of the 16th century, reaching a situation in the North Sea of what the Dutch liked to call 'good neighbourship' between Protestant brother nations. Everybody understood that in wartime soldiers would plunder, but laying waste to an entire town, as Holmes had done, was seen as a betrayal of mutual trust and thus caused a storm of indignation. Many pamphlets were written dedicated to the "Sack of ter Schelling", highlighting the presumed atrocities committed by the English. Such accusations had only a limited factual basis; the number of civilian casualties had been low. After the English had left, the operator of the northern fire beacon of Schelling was found slain and the remains of two invalid elderly women were discovered in the charred ruins of their houses; they had apparently been unable to escape the fire when it reached their homes. In some pamphlets these tragic facts were translated into a brutal massacre of the population, with English soldiers callously burning alive decrepit grandmothers. Charles's ordering of bonfires in these circumstances was condemned as a show of particularly poor taste.

Three weeks later, the Great Fire of London occurred. This led to a new wave of Dutch pamphlets and poems linking these events, often showing two engravings, the Destruction of ter Schelling at the left mirrored by that of London on the right. To the Dutch mind the connection was obvious: London had been destroyed as a Divine retribution, the Lord punishing Charles for having dared to rejoice at the calamity of his fellow Christians, "the sparks of the fire of Schelling crossing the sea, blown by the same easterly that would relentlessly burn London".

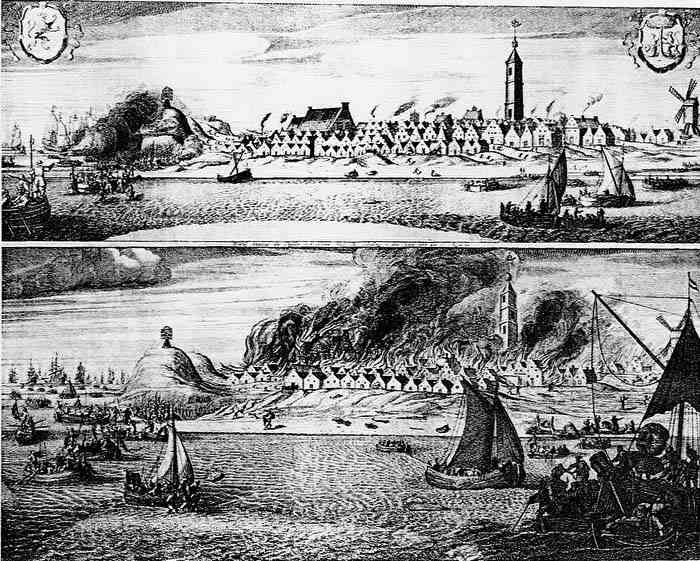
Burning of West-Terschelling. The tower on the right is the Brandaris lighthouse.

The English accounts of the raid that were published later that year did not make this connection. However, while self-congratulatory when covering the burning of the fleet, their tone turned apologetic as the destruction of ter Schelling was described. They emphasized how neat and well-laid out the town was and that it was burnt more by accident than intent, Holmes, according to them, not intending to terrorize the population. This reflected a changed mood in England. After the first feeling of satisfaction had subsided, a more sober analysis brought many to the conclusion that the raid had done the Dutch much harm, but the English little good. Although it was to be the largest single loss of shipping ever to be afflicted to the Dutch merchant fleet, 130 ships represented only a minor fraction of the total number of merchantmen, so the blow was hardly fatal. Nothing constructive had been accomplished; no major prizes taken, nor goods, no permanent base established on the islands. The destruction of ter Schelling was seen as a foolish act that could lead to a dangerous escalation. Nobody relished the prospect of the Dutch taking revenge on the largely defenceless towns of the English east coast.

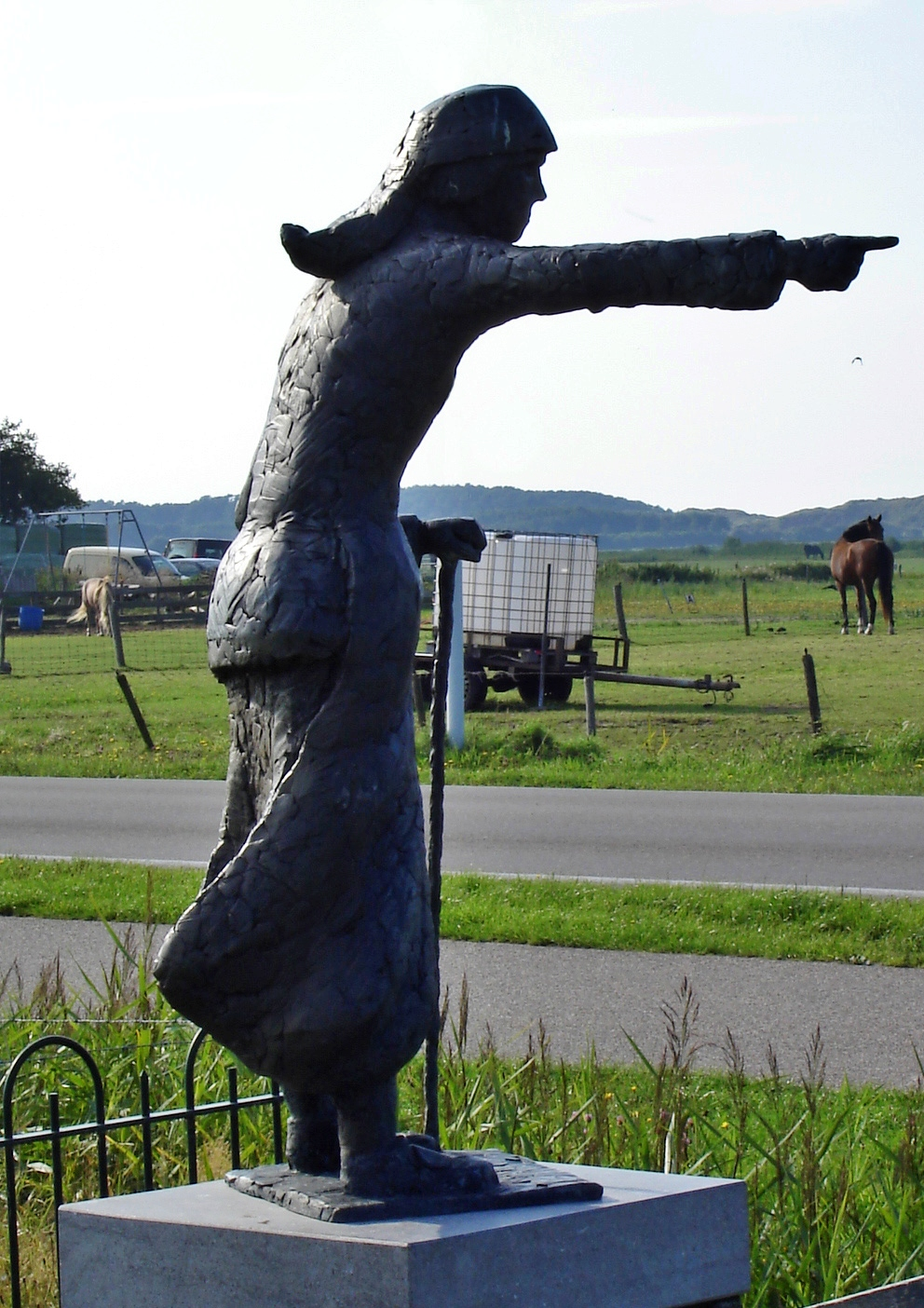
The statue of the Stryper Wyfke

In the Dutch Republic also a change of mood took place. The initial dismay was replaced by a dogged determination to continue the war and repair the damage done. The Republic had for the time a strongly institutionalised system of poor relief; and as ter Schelling was unable to help its poor, aid was offered by several municipalities, including Harlingen. Also most churches in the province of Holland held special collections of donations; as the rivalling denominations tried to outdo each other in the amount of money given, soon enough funds were available to shelter the poor for the coming winter and make a start with rebuilding the town. The Great Fire of London brought most to the conclusion that God had already avenged the destruction of ter Schelling, so no special retaliation on English coastal towns was necessary. However, when the following year Charles deliberately procrastinated the peace talks held in Breda, De Witt used the lingering resentment caused by Holmes's Bonfire to convince the States of Holland that it was justified to end the war by a devastating raid on Chatham Dockyard where the larger vessels of the English fleet were laid up. During this Raid on the Medway the Dutch marines had strict orders not to plunder or destroy any civilian property, in order to shame the English. That at least some of the English understood this, is shown by Samuel Pepys' diary entry of 30 June 1667: "It seems very remarkable to me, and of great honour to the Dutch, that those of them that did go on shore to Gillingham, though they went in fear of their lives, and were some of them killed; and, notwithstanding their provocation at Schelling, yet killed none of our people nor plundered their houses, but did take some things of easy carriage, and left the rest, and not a house burned; and, which is to our eternal disgrace, that what my Lord Douglas's men, who come after them, found there, they plundered and took all away".

When after the successful raid it seemed that Charles was still trying to prolong the talks, De Witt suggested some "light spoiling" to be carried out on the English east coast, but Lieutenant-Admiral De Ruyter protested vehemently against such a change of policy after which the Grand Pensionary had to admit such actions would be "counterproductive and even somewhat unchristian".

In later Dutch accounts of the raid the burning of ter Schelling would be much emphasized. It was kept alive in memory by a famous legend, that of the Stryper Wyfke, the "Little Wife of Stryp". According to the, probably apocryphal, story, those people having escaped massacre by fleeing to the east side of the island were saved from the encroaching English troops by an old crone near the hamlet of Stryp, where an ancient abandoned graveyard lay on a dune. Peering through the fog, some soldiers mistook the standing headstones for a line of Dutch troops and asked the old woman how many there were. She answered, in some versions of the legend in order to deceive, in others through a misunderstanding of the question: "Hundreds of them are standing, but thousands are lying"—referring to the buried corpses—after which the English would have become so frightened that they abandoned their approach. Many accounts of English naval historians however, only mention the burning of the fleet, glossing over the destruction of the town.

Today, the legend of the Stryper Wyfke is commemorated by a bronze statue west of Midsland that shows her pointing to the graveyard, facing an easterly breeze.
