= Caledonia (1807 ship) =

History

United Kingdom
- Name: Caledonia
- Builder: Chester
- Launched: 1 October 1807
- Fate: Condemned 1846; last listed 1847

General characteristics
- Tons burthen: 445 (bm)
- Sail plan: full-rigged ship
- Complement: 1807:40; 1811:30
- Armament: 1807: 20 × 18&9-pounder cannons + 6 swivel guns; 1811: 8 × 9-pounder guns + 12 × 18-pounder carronades

Caledonia was built in 1807 in Chester. She sailed as a letter of marque West Indiaman, trading between England and Demerara. She captured or recaptured two vessels, and in 1812 repelled an attack by a US privateer in a single ship action. In 1833, she made a voyage to India, sailing under one of the last licences that the British East India Company (EIC) issued before it gave up its shipping activities. Caledonia then continued to trade with India, Africa, and Peru. She suffered a maritime incident in 1840. She was condemned after having returned to Lima in April 1846 in a highly leaky state.

== Career ==
Caledonia was launched on 1 October 1807 from the Chester shipyard of Carson, Forbes, Cortney & Company and first appeared in Lloyd's Register (LR) in 1807. Captain John Thomson acquired a letter of marque on 4 November 1807.

Year	Master	Owner	Trade	Source
1807	Thompson	M'Inroy	Greenock–Demerara	LR

Caledonia, under Captain Thompson, sailed from Glasgow for Demerara on 19 December 1807 En route, Thompson detained the full-rigged ship Neutrality, (Note: Some describe her as Danish; Lloyd's Register has "D.P." (Dutch Prize), 335 tons, master H Elliesen) Ellison, master, which was coming from Vera Cruz, Mexico and reported to be worth £120,000, including £100,000 of specie, destined for London and mostly insured at Lloyd's. As Neutrality was waterlogged, she was abandoned and soon foundered, and Caledonia put back to Kinsale.

After resuming her voyage to Demerara, on 28 January 1808 Caledonia, when in the latitude of Madeira, was chased by six unidentified vessels, including a two-deck warship, but outran them and arrived at Demerara 22 days out from Kinsale. Thompson recaptured off the Cayenne River the British ship Olive Branch, which had been sailing from London to Berbice, British Guiana when a French privateer had captured her and taken her to Cayenne, French Guiana. Olive Branch was brought to Demerara.

On 18 October 1808 Caledonia was in the Mersey, preparing to leave for Demerara, when she had to cut her cables and get under weigh to escape a gale. She was resupplied the next day and was safe at anchor.

On 9 November Caledonia, Thompson, master, was "all well" at 43°20′N 27°00′W on her way from Liverpool to Demerara. She boarded the schooner Amity, from Newfoundland to Lisbon. A sea in a heavy gale had struck Amity and washed her boats and everything from her deck.

Year	Master	Owner	Trade	Source
1812	Thompson; Cameron	M'Inroy	Greenock–Demerara	LR

Captain John Cameron acquired a letter of marque on 19 December 1811. He had captained Caledonia before then. He had returned from Demerara to Liverpool, arriving on 25 June 1812 with sugar, rum, and bales of cotton.

On 2 November 1812 Caledonia, Cameron, master, as to windward of Demerara, on her way there from Liverpool. She encountered the US privateer Retaliation and an engagement ensued. Eventually, Retaliation, much damaged, withdrew to the mouth of the Orinocco River, where she watered and underwent repairs. On 10 November, Retaliation sailed to cruise off Berbice. (Note: One source describes Retaliation as a brig of 194 tons (bm), seven guns, and 114 men under the command of Captain Samuel Newson. Another source describes her as a schooner, of New York, armed with six guns and having a crew of 100 men under Newson's command. On this cruise Retaliation captured two prizes that she sent to the United States; both arrived. During the engagement with Caledonia, Captain Hill, of the sloop Retrieve, was a prisoner aboard Retaliation, together with his crew. After Retaliation sailed off to effect repairs and replenish her water, Newsom plundered Retrieve of some articles before returning her to Hill. Retrieve then came into Bridgetown, Barbados.)

Year	Master	Owner	Trade	Source & notes
1813	Cameron; Thompson	Sanbach	Liverpool–Demerara	LR
1818	Tyrer	Sanbach & Co.	Liverpool–Demerara	LR; large repair 1817
1822	D.Tyler; D.Tyrer	Sanbach & Co.	Liverpool–Demerara	LR; large repair 1817
1823	D.Tyrer; J.Bispham	Sanbach & Co.	Liverpool–Demerara	LR; large repair 1817, small repairs 1821, & thorough repair 1823

On 7 February 1825, as Caledonia, Bispham, master, was endeavouring to go to sea, she missed her stays and grounded on the North Bank. She rested there till the morning tide the next day when a steam tug got her off. She came into the Princes Dock Basin. Her cargo was being unloaded and it was expected that the dry cargo was undamaged. She had six feet of water in her hold and gave the appearance of being broken. By one report the accident occurred as Caledonia tried to avoid running into a sloop ahead of her. Columbia was not broken and returned to the Demerara trade.

Year	Master	Owner	Trade	Source & notes
1829	J.Bisham; J.Town	Sanbach	Liverpool–Demerara	LR; thorough repair 1823 & damages repaired 1825
1830	J.Town; W.White	J.Tobin	Liverpool–Africa	LR; thorough repair 1823 & damages repaired 1825
1831	W.White; T.Stroyan	J.Tobin	Liverpool–Africa	LR; thorough repair 1823, damages repaired 1825, & thorough repair 1831
1833	T.Stroyan	J.Tobin	Liverpool–Bombay	LR; thorough repair 1823 & large repair 1831

In 1832 Caledonia returned from Bombay with 2494 bales and 180 half-bales of cotton, 1000 bags of pepper, 16 bags of cowries, 6585 deer horns, and 10 bags of mother-of-pearl shells.

Year	Master	Owner	Trade	Sources & Notes
1836	T.Stroyan	Sir J.Tobin	Liverpool–Bombay	LR; almost rebuilt 1831
1841	J.Stroyan; Lawson	Bold & Co.	Liverpool; Liverpool–Bombay	LR; almost rebuilt 1831 & small repairs 1840

On 2 July 1840 Caledonia, Stroyan, master, put into Mauritius. A gale had cost her her rudder and left her leaky. She then had to unload her cargo. In subsequent voyages under Captain Lawson, Caledonia visited both Calcutta and China.

Year	Master	Owner	Trade	Sources & Notes
1843	Lawson; Bibby	Bold & Co.	Liverpool–Bombay	LR; almost rebuilt 1831 & small repairs 1840
1844	Bibby; Cumming	Bold & Co.	Liverpool–Bombay; Liverpool–Lima	LR; almost rebuilt 1831 & small repairs 1840

== Fate ==
On 9 March 1846 Caledonia, Cumming, master, sailed from Lima, bound for Liverpool. On 11 March she returned to Lima, very leaky, with water entering at a rate of 10 inches per hour. She was subsequently condemned. Caledonia was last listed in 1847.
