= 't Behouden Huys =

Museum in Friesland, Netherlands

Coordinates: 53°21′28″N 5°12′52″E

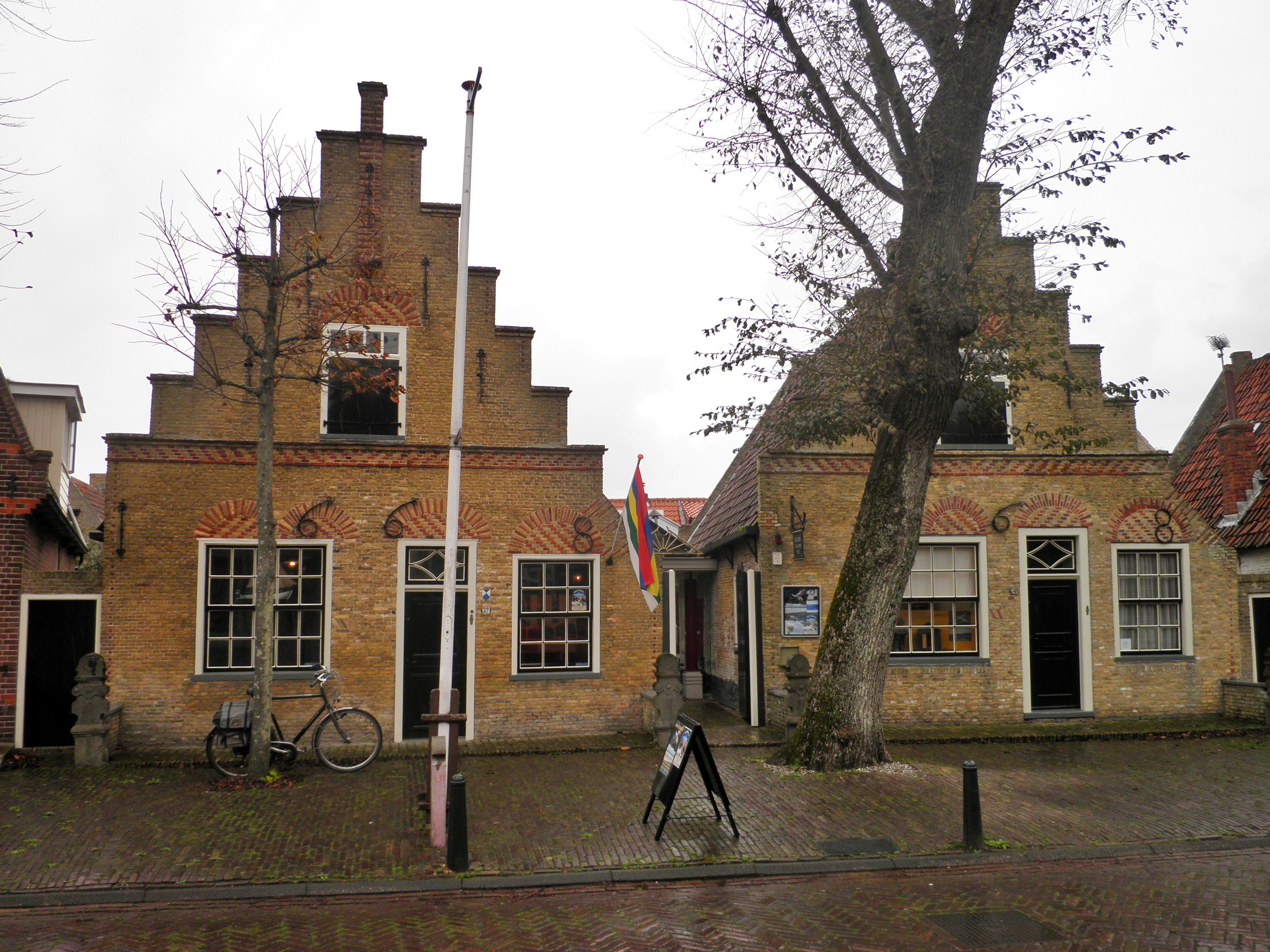
't Behouden Huys museum. The house on the left retains its original layout.

't Behouden Huys or Het Behouden Huis is a museum in West-Terschelling, Netherlands.

The museum is named after the shelter used by Willem Barentsz on his third Arctic expedition, when they became trapped in ice off northern Russia.

The museum consists of several 17th-century buildings which were once the houses of wealthy whaling commanders. The buildings were constructed in 1688. The museum was established in 1938, and acquired these buildings in 1950. During World War II the collection had to be hidden.

The building is rijksmonument 35050.
