= HMS Olive Branch =

Five ships of the British Royal Navy have been named HMS Olive Branch:

- HMS Olive Branch (1672), a 204-ton (bm) 6-gun fireship purchased in 1672 and sold in 1674.
- HMS Olive Branch (1673), a 200-ton (bm) 6-gun fireship captured in 1673 and sunk later that year.
- HMS Olive Branch (1690), a fireship purchased in 1690 and captured later that year by France.
- HMS Olive Branch, wrecked near the mouth of the Helford River in 1754.
- HMS Olive Branch (1794), a 103 or 105-ton (bm) fireship purchased in April 1794 and sold in February 1802.
