= HMS Experiment (1794) =

History

Great Britain
- Name: HMS Experiment
- Launched: 1794
- Fate: Sold 1801

General characteristics
- Tons burthen: 8479/94 (bm)
- Length: 62 ft 9 in (19.1 m) (overall); 50 ft 7 1/8 in (15.4 m) (keel)
- Beam: 17 ft 9 in (5.4 m)
- Depth of hold: 9 ft 7 in (2.9 m)
- Propulsion: Sail
- Complement: Sailing master + nine men
- Notes: Two decks

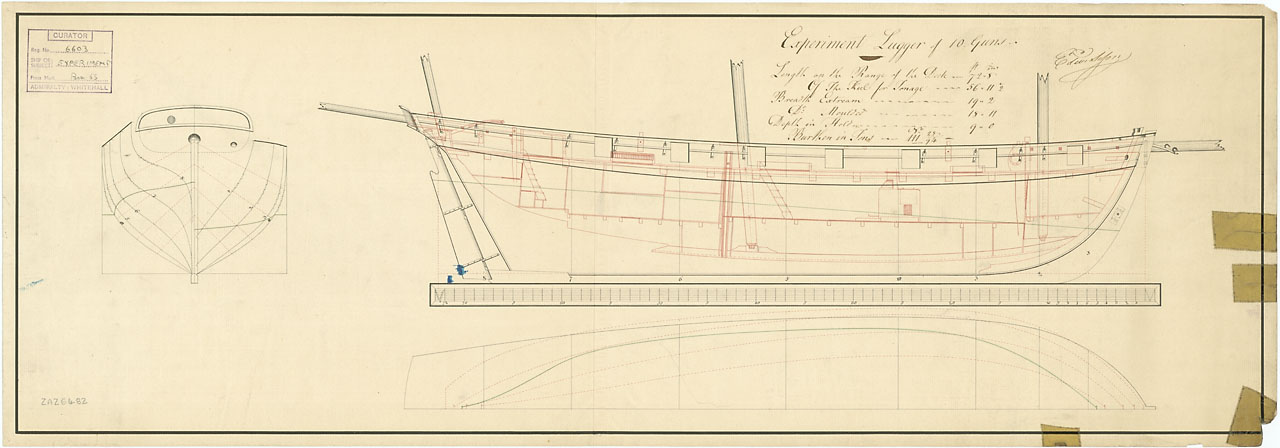
Experiment 1763 profile

Experiment was one of 12 small vessels that the Navy Board purchased pursuant to an Admiralty Order dated 6 March 1794. The aim was to expend the vessels as fire ships. None was used as a fire ship; instead, most served with Sir Sidney Smith's squadron off the coast of France.

Experiment was commissioned under Mr. James Stewart in June 1794. She was recommissioned in August 1798 under Mr. L. Huggins. She was paid off in January 1799. The Board of Commissioners and Principal Officers of the Navy offered Experiment, of 85 tons burthen, copper-sheathed and fastened, and laying at Woolwich for sale on 16 December 1801. She sold there on that date for £205.
