= Mentor (1781 ship) =

History

Great Britain
- Builder: New England
- Launched: 1781
- Captured: Early 1795

General characteristics
- Tons burthen: 180, or 219 (bm)
- Complement: 20
- Armament: 10 × 4-pounder guns + 4 swivel guns

Mentor was launched in New England in 1781. From 1784 she sailed from Great Britain, trading between London and New York or Quebec. From 1789 she made three complete voyages as a whaler in the British Southern Whale Fishery. The French Navy captured her in early 1795 as she was returning from her fourth whaling voyage.

== Career ==
Mentor first appeared in Lloyd's Register (LR) in 1784. For the next few years she traded across the Atlantic to New York and Quebec.

Year	Master	Owner	Trade	Source & notes	
1784	J.Laughton	S.Pearce	London–New York	LR; raised 1783	
1786	W.Nichol	J.Laughton	S.Pearce	London–New York	LR; raised 1783 & good repair 1785
1787	W.Nichol; L.Martin	S.Pearce	London–New York; London–Quebec	LR; raised 1783 & good repair 1785	
1789	L.Martin; Lucas	Capt.&Co. Spence	London–Quebec; London–Southern Fishery	LR; raised 1783 & good repair 1785	

1st whaling voyage (1789–1790): Captain Lucas sailed on 19 November 1789. Mentor returned on 4 November 1790.

2nd whaling voyage (1791–1792): Captain Gardner sailed from London on 7 March 1791, bound for Walvis Bay. Mentor returned on 18 May 1792. (Note: Captain Lucas was master of Olive Branch in 1791-1792, engaged in whaling.)

3rd whaling voyage (1792–1793): Captain Lucas sailed from London on 16 October 1792, bound for Patagonia. On her way Mentor stopped at Rio de Janeiro and Montevideo. She returned to Britain on 11 October 1793 with 21,000 seal skins.

War with France had broken out in February 1793. Captain William Lucas acquired a letter of marque on 28 December 1793.

4th whaling voyage (1794): Captain Lucas sailed on 20 March 1794, bound for Walvis Bay.

== Fate ==
Mentor, of 10 guns, from the South Seas, was reported in February 1795 as having been captured by a French naval squadron.
