= French ship Galatée =

Twenty-two ships of the French Navy have borne the name Galatée or Galathée, in honour of Galatea:

== Ships named Galatée ==
- Galatée (1719), a frigate
- Galatée (1744), a 24-gun frigate, lead ship of her class
- Galathée (1779), a 32-gun frigate, lead ship of her class
- Géographe (1800), a 20-gun corvette, better known as Géographe
- Galatée (1845), a 30-gun corvette
- Galatée (Q132), a Sirène-class submarine launched in 1925 and scuttled in 1942
- Galatée (S646), a Daphné-class submarine completed in 1964 and decommissioned in 1991

== Ships named Galathée ==
- Galathée (1696), a 20-gun frigate
- Galathée (1708), a 28-gun frigate
- Galathée (1812), a 46-gun Consolante-class frigate
Ships of the French Navy named Galathée
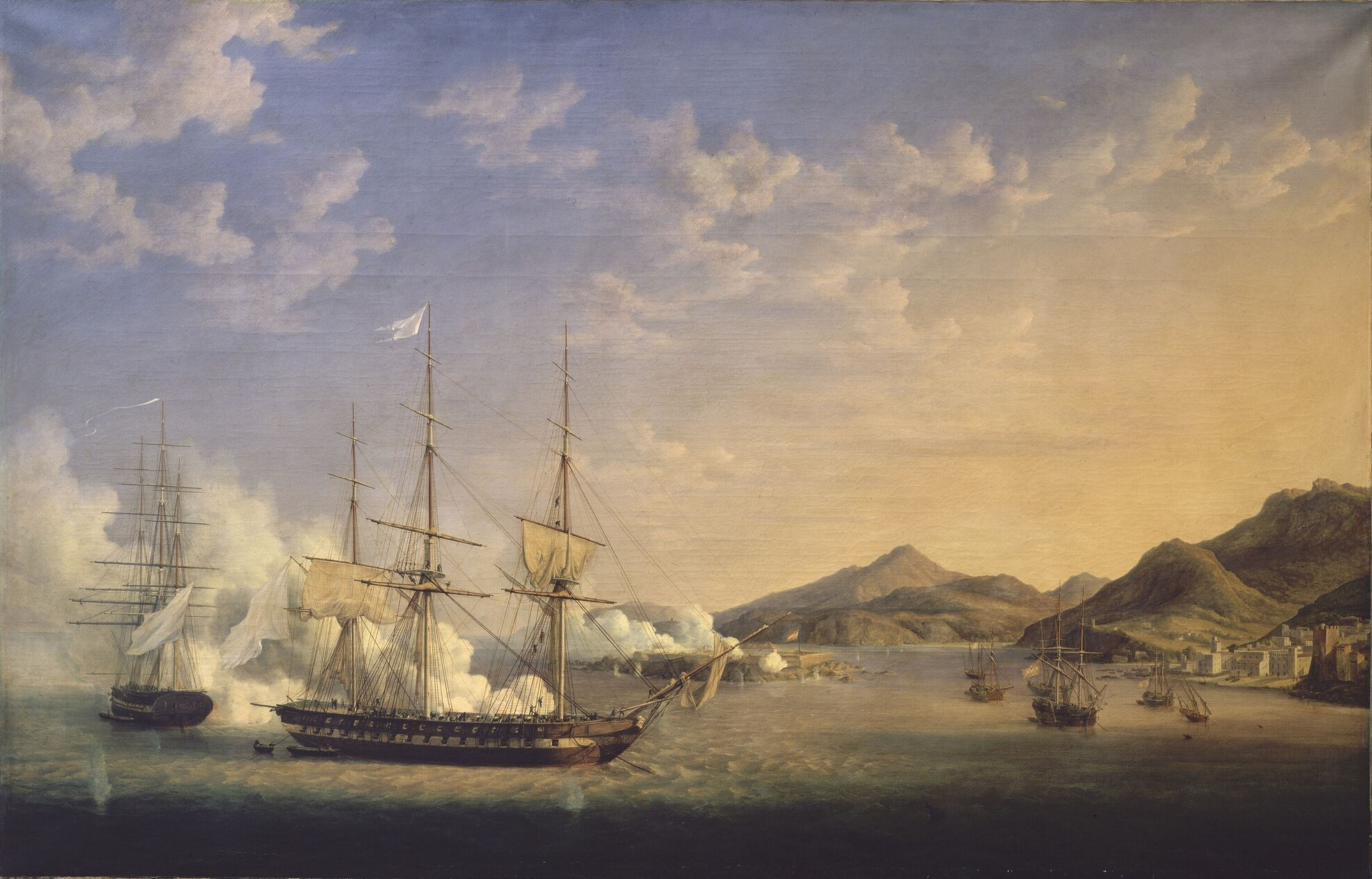
Galathée (1812) (first from left) attacking Spanish batteries in the Bay of Gibraltar on 13 August 1823

== See also ==
- HMS Galatea
