= Olive Branch (1775 ship) =

History

Great Britain
- Name: Olive Branch
- Namesake: Olive branch
- Builder: Philadelphia
- Launched: 1775
- Fate: Lost August 1791

General characteristics
- Tons burthen: 238, or 260, or 273 (bm)
- Armament: 2 × 4-pounder guns (1783)
- Notes: Built of live oak

Olive Branch was launched in 1775 in Philadelphia. From at least 1776 on she sailed as a West Indiaman from Great Britain. In 1791 she sailed as a whaler to the British Southern Whale Fishery, but was lost in August, early in the outbound leg of her voyage.

== Career ==
Olive Branch first appeared in Lloyd's Register (LR) in 1776.

Year	Master	Owner	Trade	Source & notes
1776	Js.Hathorn	Stocker & Co.	Bristol–Tobago	LR
1778	J.Hathorn; Js. Trew	Passy & Co. Capt. & Co.	London–Grenada	LR
1783	J.Trew	Captain & Co.	London–Barbados	LR
1789	R.Trew	Braithwaite	London–Grenada	LR
1790	T.Trew	Turner & Co.	London–Grenada	LR
1791	_.Trew; Lucas	Turner (crossed out)	London–Grenada; London–South Seas	LR; thorough repair 1791
1792	[William] Lucas	Fowden (or Fowler)	London–Southern Fishery	LR; thorough repair 1791

On 11 April 1791 Olive Branch, Lucas, master, sailed from the Downs, bound for the South Seas. She was reported in November to have been at the Isle of Man on 22 May.

== Fate ==
In January 1792 Lloyd's List reported that Olive Branch, Lucas, master, had been lost off the coast of Patagonia. She had been lost off Puerto Deseado in August 1791; some of the crew made it to Montevideo in a boat on 28 December 1791.

By one report the Spanish Compania Maritima purchased Olive Branch. LR continued to carry Olive Branch for some years after 1791, but with unchanged data.

Captain Lucas survived. In 1793 he returned to the command of Mentor, sailing her on a whaling voyage.
