= HMS Speedwell (1690) =

30-gun fifth rate sloop of the Royal Navy

History

England
- Name: HMS Speedwell
- Ordered: 6 December 1689
- Builder: Thomas Gressingham, 'Redrith' (Rotherhithe)
- Launched: 3 April 1690
- Commissioned: 4 April 1690
- Fate: Wrecked in 1720

General characteristics
- Type: 8-gun fireship; 24-gun fifth rate
- Tons burthen: 259 53/94 bm
- Length: 94 ft 0 in (28.7 m) gun deck; 78 ft 6 in (23.9 m) keel for tonnage
- Beam: 24 ft 11 in (7.6 m) for tonnage
- Depth of hold: 9 ft 8 in (2.9 m)
- Sail plan: ship-rigged
- Complement: as fireship 45; as fifth rate 115
- Armament: as fireship; 8 × 6-pdrs on wooden trucks; Rerated as fifth rate; 2 × 9-pdrs on wooden trucks (LD); 20 × 6-pdr 19 cwt guns on wooden trucks (UD); 4 × 4-pdr 12 cwt guns on wooden trucks (QD)

General characteristics as rebuilt 1702
- Type: 24-gun fifth rate
- Tons burthen: 269 22/94 bm
- Length: 94 ft 9 in (28.9 m) gun deck; 78 ft 10.5 in (24.0 m) keel for tonnage
- Beam: 25 ft 4 in (7.7 m) for tonnage
- Depth of hold: 9 ft 8.5 in (3.0 m)
- Sail plan: ship-rigged
- Armament: 2 × 9-pdrs on wooden trucks (LD); 20 × 6-pdr 19 cwt guns on wooden trucks (UD); 4 × 4-pdr 12 cwt guns on wooden trucks (QD)

General characteristics as rebuilt 1716
- Type: 20-gun sixth rate
- Tons burthen: 273 69/94 bm
- Length: 95 ft 5.5 in (29.1 m) gun deck; 78 ft 9.75 in (24.0 m) keel for tonnage
- Beam: 25 ft 6.5 in (7.8 m) for tonnage
- Depth of hold: 11 ft 6 in (3.5 m)
- Sail plan: ship-rigged
- Armament: 20 × 6-pdr 19 cwt guns on wooden trucks (UD)

HMS Speedwell was a fireship of the 1689 Programme built under contract. She would be rebuilt and rerated several times from a fireship to a 24-gun fifth rate then reduced to a 20-gun sixth rate and finally a bomb ketch. She was at the Battle of Barfleur in 1692 and had an attempted mutiny in 1699. After her first rebuild she was employed in the Irish Sea capturing four privateers and recapturing a sloop. She was wrecked on the Dutch coast in 1720.

Speedwell was the fifth named vessel since it was used for a galley captured from the French in the Firth of Forth in January 1560 and broken in 1580.

== Construction ==
She was ordered on 6 December 1689 to be constructed under contract by Thomas Gressingham of 'Redrith' (Rotherhithe). Terms of the awarded on 18 December 1689 was the vessel would cost £7.2.6d (Note: A total cost accounting for inflation of approximately £1,500 in today's money.) per ton. She was launched on 3 April 1690. The dimensions were gun deck 94 feet 0 inches (28.7 metres) with a keel length of 78 feet 6 inches (23.9 metres). The breadth was 24 feet 11 inches (7.6 metres) with a hold depth of 9 ft 8 in (2.9 m). The gun armament would be eight 6-pounder guns mounted on wooden trucks.

== Commissioned service ==
She was commissioned on 4 April 1690 under the command of Captain John Mason, (died 5 February 1691). On 21 July 1690, she was under the command of Captain Stephen Woolgate, who died later in 1690. In 1692 Captain Thomas Symonds, took command. She was at the Battle of Barfleur as a member of Blue Squadron from 19 to 24 May 1692. She was with the Smyrna convoy in June 1693. She sailed with Neville's squadron to the West Indies in 1694. Captain David Wavell, took command on 15 February 1694 for service in Berkeley's squadron in 1694. She was off the Irish coast from 1694 to 1697. She was rerated as a 24-gun fifth rate on 23 May 1695. Her gun armament was increased to two 9-pounders on her lower deck (LD) with eighteen 6-pounders on her upper deck (UD) and four 4-pounders on her quarterdeck (QD) with an increase in manning to 115 officers and men. In 1697 Captain John Guy, took command for service in the West Indies. After the death of Captain Guy on 9 December 1697, Captain Christopher Colson took command. After the death of Captain Colson, Captain Jedediah Barker took command. There was an attempted mutiny in 1600. She returned home and paid off in 1700. In 1701 she was dismantled for rebuilding.

== Rebuild at Limehouse 1701–1702 ==
She was ordered to be rebuilt on 9 October 1701 by Newman & Graves of Limehouse. Her approved launching date was 28 August 1702. The dimensions after rebuild were gun deck 94 feet 9 inches (28.9 metres) with a keel length of 78 feet 10.5 inches (24.0 metres) for tonnage calculation. The breadth would be 25 feet 4 inches (7.7 metres) with a depth of hold of 9 ft 8.5 in (3.0 m). The tonnage calculation would be 269 22/94 tons. Her gun armament would be unchanged.

== Commissioned service after rebuild ==
She was commissioned in June 1702 under the command of Captain George Camocke, for the Irish coast. In concert with HMS Shoreham she took the privateers L'Adventure on 30 July 1705 and La Bonne-Francoise on 19 June 1706. She recaptured the sloop Wolf on 1 June 1708. She took the privateers La Marie-Therese on 13 July 1708 and La Mignonne on 20 June 1709. In November 1710 she was under command of Captain Philip Vanburgh, still assigned to the Irish Sea. She underwent a middling repair at Portsmouth from November 1712 to February 1713 costing £1,118.7.9 1/4d. (Note: A total cost accounting for inflation of approximately £209,500 in today's money.) Upon completion she deployed to Barbados. She returned to Home Waters and was docked at Deptford in 1715. She was ordered to be rebuilt as a sixth rate by Admiralty Order (AO) 17 December 1715. Her dismantling commenced in November 1715.

== Rebuild as sixth rate 1716 ==
Admiralty Order issued on 17 December 1715 proposed to rebuild the ageing fifth-rate vessel as a 20-gun sixth-rate. This work was swiftly conducted under the supervision of Deptford Dockyard master shipwright Richard Stacey, with the newly reconstructed vessel launched on 27 March 1716. The rebuilt gun deck was 95 feet 5.5 inches (29.1 metres) atop a keel of 78 feet 9.75 inches (24.0 metres). The vessel's breadth was 25 feet 6.5 inches (7.8 metres) with a hold depth of 11 ft 6 in (3.5 m). Armament was reduced to twenty 6-pounder cannons. She was completed for sea on 27 July 1716 at a total cost of £2,465.19.9 1/2d. (Note: A total cost accounting for inflation of approximately £437,900 in today's money.)

== Commissioned service as a sixth rate ==
She was commissioned in June 1716 under the command of Captain George Clinton, for the Mediterranean. In December 1716 Captain Robert Man, took command for service off Sale, Morocco. She was ordered Home in December 1718 to pay off. She was converted to a bomb-vessel by Admiralty Order (AO) 9 July 1719 for £3,220.14.11d (Note: A total cost accounting for inflation of approximately £627,600 in today's money.) between June and August 1719. She recommissioned in 1720 under Captain Joseph Watts for service in the Baltic.

== Disposition ==
HMS Speedwell was wrecked on the Dutch coast on 21 November 1720.
