= HMS Rifleman (1804) =

Brig of the Royal Navy

History

United Kingdom
- Name: Telegraph
- Builder: John Perry, Wells, and Green, Blackwall
- Launched: c.1804
- Renamed: HMS Rifleman
- Fate: Sold 1809

General characteristics
- Tons burthen: 16210/94 (bm)
- Length: 80 ft 2 in (24.4 m) (overall); 61 ft 6 3/4 in (18.8 m) (keel)
- Beam: 22 ft 3 in (6.8 m)
- Propulsion: Sails
- Sail plan: Brig
- Complement: 18
- Armament: 4 × 12-pounder carronades

HMS Rifleman was the mercantile brig Telegraph that the Royal Navy purchased in 1804, renamed, and intended for use as a fireship. The Navy sold her in 1809.

Between 21 June and 31 August 1804, Rifleman underwent fitting at Deptford. Lieutenant Peter Rigby commissioned her in July. His replacement, in 1806, was Lieutenant William Napier who sailed her on The Downs station. In mid-June, Rifleman detained Industry, Meyer, master, which had been sailing from Amsterdam to Virginia, and sent her into Dover.

The Principal Officers and Commissioners of His Majesty's Navy offered "His Majesty's Gun-Brigs Boxer and Rifleman, lying at Sheerness", for sale on 27 July 1809.
