= HMS Firebrand (1804b) =

History

Great Britain
- Name: Lord Lennox
- Acquired: 1799 as a prize
- Fate: Sold 1804

United Kingdom
- Name: HMS Firebrand
- Acquired: 1804 by purchase
- Fate: Sold 1807

United Kingdom
- Name: Lord Lennox
- Acquired: 1807 by purchase
- Fate: Last listed 1815

General characteristics
- Type: Schooner
- Tons burthen: 72, or 73, or 90 (bm)
- Length: 55 ft 6 in (16.9 m) (overall); 40 ft 6 in (12.3 m) (keel)
- Beam: 18 ft 5 in (5.6 m)
- Propulsion: Sail
- Armament: 1810: 2 × 3-pounder guns

HMS Firebrand was the mercantile schooner Lord Lennox, a French prize taken in 1799 and renamed. In 1803 her master and owner was J.S.Lloyd, and her trade was London—Rouen. She had undergone a good repair in 1799.

The Royal Navy purchased her in 1804 for use as a fire ship but sold her in 1807.

The "Principal Officers and Commissioners of His Majesty's Navy" offered Firebrand and several other vessels for sale on 17 March 1807 at Sheerness.

Her purchasers returned her to her prior name. Lord Lennox re-entered Lloyd's Register in 1808 with Whiteside, master, Hedgecock, owner, and trade London–Cadiz. She then traded between London and Lisbon and was last listed in the Register of Shipping in 1815.

Year	Master	Owner	Trade	Source
1810	A.Grieg	Hedgecock	London–Lisbon	Register of Shipping
1815	A.Grieg	Hedgecock	London–Lisbon	Register of Shipping
