= Brandaris =

Lighthouse on the Wadden Sea island Terschelling, Netherlands

Brandaris Lighthouse Terschelling
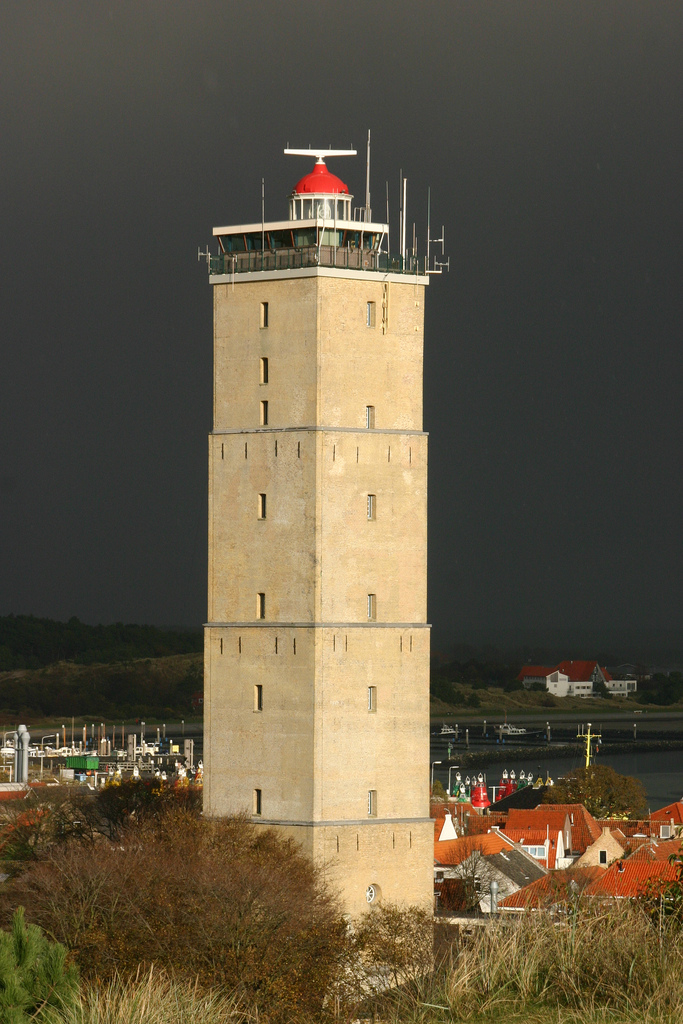
- The Brandaris in 2005
- Location: Terschelling; Netherlands
- Coordinates: 53°21′37.4″N 5°12′51.2″E

Tower
- Constructed: 1594 (first)
- Construction: masonry tower
- Height: 52.5 metres (172 ft)
- Shape: square tower with balcony and lantern
- Markings: unpainted brick tower, red lantern roof
- Operator: Rijkswaterstaat
- Heritage: Rijksmonument
- Racon: CG

Light
- First lit: 1835 (current)
- Focal height: 56 metres (184 ft)
- Lens: two 4th order Fresnel lenses
- Intensity: 3,500,000 candela
- Range: 29 nmi (54 km; 33 mi)
- Characteristic: Fl W 5s. 0.3 sec. light; 4,7 sec. dark
- Netherlands no.: 2080

The Brandaris is a lighthouse on the Dutch Wadden Sea island Terschelling, in Friesland. It is the oldest lighthouse in the Netherlands, listed as a Rijksmonument, number 35032 and rated with a very high historical value.

== History ==
The first tower was built in 1323 to guide ships on their way to Amsterdam, through the Zuiderzee and over the Vlie, the narrow opening between Vlieland and Terschelling. A good position marking was necessary because many islands in the North Sea look very similar.

When the sea flooded Terschelling in 1570 the tower was completely destroyed. In 1592 the construction of a new tower was started, but it collapsed before it was finished because bad building materials had been used. The current tower was built in 1594.

In 1837 the tower was the first lighthouse in the Netherlands to be equipped with a rotating Fresnel lens. Electrification took place in 1907. Today, the light in the tower is controlled fully automatically.

== Description ==
Brandaris is the oldest preserved tower specifically built as a lighthouse in the Netherlands. In 1907 it was the first lighthouse in the Netherlands to be fitted with electric lighting. Brandaris is specially equipped to prevent birds from flying against the tower.

Construction period	1593-1594
Tower height	54 metres
Height of the circular beam light	55.5 metres
Range of light	52 kilometres
Luminous intensity	3,500,000 candela
Material	yellow stone
Listed (CHM)	yes, since 1965
Radar	yes, since 1979
Manned?	yes, around the clock
Open to the public?	no

== Name ==
The name of this tower may be a reference to Saint Brendan of Clonfert.

Mount Brandaris is a hill that is the highest point on the island of Bonaire, a special municipality of the Netherlands in the southern Caribbean Sea.

There is also a Dutch rolling tobacco brand Brandaris (shag), classified as heavy, containing 12 mg (0.00042 oz) of tar and 1.3 mg (4.6×10^{−5} oz) of nicotine per 750 mg (0.026 oz) of tobacco.

== See also ==
- List of lighthouses in the Netherlands
