= HMS Friendship (1794) =

Mercantile vessel that the Royal Navy purchased in 1794 for use as a fireship

History

Great Britain
- Name: HMS Friendship
- Acquired: 1794 by purchase
- Fate: Broken up 1801

General characteristics
- Tons burthen: 5588/94(bm)
- Length: Overall:50 ft 9 in (15.5 m); Keel:36 ft 9 in (11.2 m)
- Beam: 16 ft 11 in (5.2 m)
- Depth of hold: 9 ft 5 1/2 in (2.9 m)
- Complement: 9

HMS Friendship was a mercantile vessel, one of 12 that the Royal Navy purchased in 1794 for use as fireships. They were under the command of a Sailing Master, rather than an officer. None was expended; instead they served as small gunboats, though their armament was not formally established.

Mister Bromwick commissioned Friendship in May 1794. She was paid off in January 1796. Mr. A. Chapman recommissioned her in November 1796. Mr. James Welsh took command in August 1798. She was paid off in January 1799. By one account she was broken up at Woolwich in September or November 1801.

However, the "Principal Officers and Commissioners of His Majesty's Navy" offered Friendship (1st) for sale on 2 March 1802 at Plymouth. She sold on that day for £110.
