= HMS Olive Branch (1794) =

History

Great Britain
- Name: HMS Olive Branch
- Acquired: 1794 by purchase
- Fate: Sold 1802

General characteristics
- Tons burthen: 103, or 105 (bm)
- Complement: Master and nine crew

The British Admiralty acquired the mercantile Olive Branch in 1794 and commissioned her as the fire ship HMS Olive Branch. It sold her February 1802.

== Career ==
After the outbreak of war with France in 1793, the Admiralty purchased 12 small mercantile vessels for use as fire ships. The Navy never used them as such; some received armament and served with Sidney Smith's squadron off the French coast.

One of the vessels the Admiralty purchased was Olive Branch. It is possible that HMS Olive Branch had been Olive Branch, of 96–110 tons (bm), which was last listed in Lloyd's Register in 1793.

Olive Branch underwent fitting at Woolwich between April 1794 and 3 July 1795. Mister Patrick Campbell commissioned her in June and commanded her until some point in 1796. Mr. Adam Grieve recommissioned her in August 1798. She was paid off in January 1799.

== Fate ==
The "Principal Officers and Commissioners of his Majesty's Navy" offered "Olive Branch, Fire-Vessel 105 tons, lying at Woolwich" for sale on 24 February 1802. She sold there in February.
