= List of corvette and sloop classes of the Royal Navy =

This is a list of Sixth-rate, corvette, and sloop classes of the Royal Navy.

During the Age of Sail, warships were divided into ranks or classes. The English Royal Navy adopted a scheme of six classes or "rates" in 1626. This system was in place until the 1840s, when steam power was introduced. The vessels classed as "Sixth-rates" were used in trade protection and at times could be used as scouts for the fleet (a task normally associated with "Fifth-rates"). In 1626, a "Sixth-rate" was defined as a ship having a crew of 40 to 50 men. In 1653, this was changed, to from 40 up to 79 men. After the Restoration in 1660, a "Sixth-rate" carried up to 24 guns, though 18 to 20 was more common. By the end of the 1600s, the crew size had grown to over 100 men, with a flush deck battery of six pound guns. By the 1750s, a "Sixth-rate" would carry up to 28 guns. In the mid 18th-century, the definition was formally established based on ship size, armament, and crew size.

With the advent of steam assisted and steam powered vessels, the term "Sixth-rate" was replaced by "Sloop" as an official type of ship in the Royal Navy. The term "Corvette", adopted from the French, was not adopted as an official ship type until 1862. This only lasted until 1888 when it was replaced by the term "Third Class Cruiser". The term sloop returned during World War I for vessels dedicated to convoy escort. It remained in use until the 1960s. The term corvette did not reappear as an official ship type until just before the start of World War II, as a convoy escort vessel, and is still used in some navies today.

Note that vessels captured from other countries and incorporated into the Royal Navy were rated in accordance with the ship rating classification.

== Corvette classes ==
=== Late 17th-century Sixth Rate groups ===
- Anthony Deane group. All designed by the notable Master Shipwright.
  - Fanfan (1666), built as a yacht – made into a harbour craft 1692.
  - Roebuck (1666), 16 guns – sold 1683.
  - Francis (1666), 16 guns – wrecked 1684.
  - Truelove (1647) (rebuilt as a fireship in 1668), 12 guns – expended in 1672.
  - Saudadoes (1669), 16 guns as rebuilt 1673, captured and burnt by the French 1696.
  - Greyhound (1672), 16 guns – sold 1698.
  - Larke (1675), 18 guns – sold 1698.
- Maidstone Group – 18 ships, guns 20 × 6-pdrs, + 4 smaller. 1693–1697
  - Maidstone (1693) – sold 1714.
  - Jersey (1694) – renamed Margate 1698, wrecked 1707.
  - Lizard (1694) – wrecked 1696.
  - Newport (1694) – captured by the French 1696.
  - Falcon (1694) – captured by the French 1696, retaken 1703 and broken up.
  - Queenborough (1694) – sold 1719.
  - Swan (1694) – foundered 1707.
  - Drake (1694) – wrecked 1694.
  - Solebay (1694) – wrecked 1709.
  - Seahorse (1694 sixth rate) – wrecked 1704.
  - Bideford (1695) – wrecked 1699.
  - Penzance (1695) – sold 1713.
  - Dunwich (1695) – sunk as a breakwater 1714.
  - Orford (1695) – renamed Newport 1698, sold 1714.
  - Lizard (1697) – sold 1714.
  - Flamborough (1697) – captured by the French 1705 and scuttled.
  - Seaford (1697) – rebuilt in 1722.
  - Deal Castle (1697) – captured by the French 1706.
- Seaford (1695) (Purchased from builder in 1695), with 20 × 6-pdrs, + 4 smaller. – captured by the French 1697.

=== 18th-century (1700–51) Sixth Rate Groups ===
- Peregrine Galley – 1 ship, with 16 × 6-pdrs, + 4 smaller. 1700
- Nightingale Group – 3 ships, with 20 × 6-pdrs, + 4 smaller. 1702–1704
  - Nightingale (1702) – taken by the French 1707, retaken and renamed Fox 1708, rebuilt in 1724.
  - Squirrel (1703) – taken by the French 1703.
  - Squirrel (1704) – taken by the French 1706, retaken 1708 and foundered.
- Ex-French Prizes 1704 – 1709
  - Sun Prize (1704)
  - Medway's Prize (1704)
  - Valeur (1705)
  - Triton's Prize (1705)
  - Cruizer (1705)
  - Fox Prize (1705)
  - Enterprise (1705)
  - Dunkirk's Prize (1705)
  - Child's Play (1706)
  - Orford's Prize (1708)
  - Fame (1709)
- Purchased Group – 3 ships, with 20 × 6-pdrs, + 4 smaller. 1706–1707
  - Aldborough (1706) – broken up 1727 and rebuilt under same name
  - Nightingale (1707) – sold 1716.
  - Deal Castle (1706) – rebuilt under same name 1719 Establishment
- Flamborough Group – 2 ships, with 20 × 6-pdrs, + 4 smaller. 1707
  - Flamborough (1707) – dismantled for rebuilding in 1727.
  - Squirrel (1707) – broken up 1727.
- Ex-Scottish Acquisitions – 2 24-gun sixth rates
  - Glasgow (1707) - Ex Royal Mary of the Scottish Navy, sold 1719
  - Dumbarton Castle (1707) - taken by French 1708
- Gibraltar Group – 12 ships, with 20 × 6-pdrs, + 4 smaller. 1711–1716
  - Solebay (1711) – sold 1748.
  - Gibraltar (1711) – dismantle for rebuilding 1725 thru 1727.
  - Port Mahon (1711) – broken up 1740.
  - Blandford (1711) – foundered 1719.
  - Hind (1712) – wrecked 1721.
  - Seahorse (1712) – dismantled for rebuild 1727.
  - Rose (1712) – dismantled at Woolwich for rebuilding in 1722.
  - Bideford (1712) – docked at Chatham for rebuilding in 1727.
  - Success (1712) – sold 1743.
  - Greyhound (1712) – captured by Spain 1718, retaken 1719 and burnt.
  - Lively (1713) – broken up 1738.
  - Speedwell (1690) – converted to bomb-vessel 1719, wrecked 1720.
- Dursley Galley – 1 ship, with 20 × 6-pdrs. 1719. Sold 1745
- 1719 Establishment Group – 20 ships, with 20 × 6-pdrs. 1720–1727
  - Lyme (1720) – ex-fifth rate, broken up 1739.
  - Greyhound (1720) – broken in 1741.
  - Blandford (1720) – sold 1742.
  - Shoreham (1720) – ex-fifth rate, sold 1744.
  - Scarborough (1722) – ex-fifth rate, sold 1739.
  - Scarborough (1694) – renamed Garland, ex-fifth rate, sold 1744.
  - Seaford – rebuild of Seaford (1697) and broken up 1740.
  - Lowestoffe (1723) – ex-fifth rate, sold 1744.
  - Rose – rebuilt Rose (1712) and sold 1744.
  - Deal Castle – rebuild of Deal Castle (1706) and sold 1746.
  - Fox – rebuild of Nightingale (1702), renamed Fox in 1708, broken up 1738.
  - Gibraltar – rebuild of Gibraltar (1711) and sold 1749.
  - Bideford – rebuild of Bideford (1712), foundered 1736.
  - Seahorse – rebuild of Seahorse (1712), sold 1748.
  - Squirrel – rebuild of Squirrel (1707), sold 1749.
  - Phoenix (1694) – sold 1744.
  - Aldborough – rebuild of Aldborough (1706) and broken up 1742.
  - Flamborough – rebuild of Flamborough (1707) and sold 1749.
  - Experiment (1689) – ex-fifth rate, broken up 1738.
  - Rye (1727) – broken up 1735.
- Modified 1719 Establishment Group – 2 ships, with 20 × 6-pdrs. 1732
  - Sheerness – rebuild of Sheerness (1691) sold 1744.
  - Dolphin (1732) – renamed Firebrand 1755, then Penguin 1757, captured by French and burnt 1760.
- 1733 Establishment Group – 16 ships, with 20 × 9-pdrs. 1734–1742
  - Tartar (1734) – broken up 1755.
  - Kennington (1736) – broken up 1749.
  - Fox (1740) – foundered 1745.
  - Winchelsea (1740) – broken up 1761.
  - Lyme (1740) – foundered 1747.
  - Rye (1740) – wrecked 1744.
  - Experiment (1740) – sold 1763.
  - Lively (1740) – sold 1750.
  - Port Mahon (1740) – sold 1763.
  - Scarborough (1740) – sold 1749.
  - Success (1740) – broken up 1779.
  - Rose (1740) – sold 1755.
  - Bideford (1740) – broken up 1754.
  - Bridgewater (1740) – wrecked 1743.
  - Seaford (1741) – broken up 1754.
  - Solebay (1742) – sold 1763.
- Modified 1733 Establishment Group – 2 ships, with 20 × 9-pdrs. 1741
  - Greyhound (1741) – sold 1768.
  - Blandford (1741) – sold 1763.
- 1741 Establishment Group – 15 ships, with 22 × 9-pdrs, + 2 smaller. 1742–1746
  - Lowestoffe (1742) – sold 1749.
  - Aldborough (1743) – sold 1749.
  - Alderney (1743) – sold 1749.
  - Phoenix (1743) – sold 1762.
  - Sheerness (1743) – sold 1768.
  - Wager (1744) – sold 1763.
  - Shoreham (1744) – sold 1758.
  - Bridgewater (1744) – burnt to avoid capture 1758.
  - Glasgow (1745) – sold 1756.
  - Triton (1745) – burnt to avoid capture 1758.
  - Mercury (1745) – broken up 1753.
  - Surprise (1746) – sold 1770.
  - Siren (1745) – sold 1764.
  - Fox (1746) – wrecked 1751.
  - Rye (1746) – sold 1763.
- Modified 1741 Establishment Group – 2 ships, with 20 × 9-pdrs, + 2 smaller. 1746
  - Centaur (1746) – sold 1761.
  - Deal Castle (1746) – broken up 1754.
- Nightingale (1746) purchase – sunk as a breakwater 1783.
- 1745 Establishment Group – 7 ships, with 22 × 9-pdrs, + 2 smaller. 1746–1751
  - Garland (1748) – sold 1761.
  - Arundel (1746) – sold 1765.
  - Queenborough (1747) – foundered 1761.
  - Fowey (1749) – burnt to avoid capture 1781.
  - Hind (1749) – sold 1784.
  - Sphinx (1748) – sold 1770.
  - Dolphin (1751) – broken up 1777.
- Modified 1745 Establishment Group – 1 ship, with 22 × 9-pdrs, + 2 smaller. 1748
  - Boston (1748) – broken up 1752.
- Seahorse (1748) – sold 1784.
- Mermaid (1749) – bilged 1759 and abandoned 1760.

=== 18th-century (1752–99) Sixth Rate Groups ===
- Gibraltar class – 1 ship, with 20 × 9-pdrs. 1754.
  - Gibraltar (1754) – broken up 1773.
- Seaford class – 1 ship, with 20 × 9-pdrs. 1754.
  - Seaford (1754) – 33 guns in 1780, sold 1784.
- Squirrel class – 10 ships, with 20 × 9-pdrs. 1775–1781.
  - Squirrel (1755) – sold 1783.
  - Deal Castle (1756) – wrecked 1780.
- Bideford class – 1 ship, with 20 × 9-pdrs. 1756.
  - Bideford (1756) – wrecked 1761.
- Later Gibraltar – 6 ships, with 20 × 9-pdrs. 1756.
  - Flamborough (1756) – sold 1772.
  - Aldborough (1756) – broken up 1777.
  - Kennington (1756) – broken up 1774.
  - Lively (1756) – sold 1784.
  - Mercury (1756) – wrecked 1777.
  - Scarborough (1756) – foundered 1780.
- Later Seaford – 2 ships, with 20 × 9-pdrs. 1757.
  - Rose (1757) – sunk as blockship 1779.
  - Glasgow (1757) – burnt by accident 1779.
- Sphinx class – 10 ships, with 20 × 9-pdrs, + 4 smaller. 1775–1781.
  - Sphinx (1775) – broken up 1811.
  - Camilla (1776) – sold 1831.
  - Daphne (1776) – sold 1802.
  - Galatea (1776) – broken up 1783.
  - Ariadne (1776) – sold 1814.
  - Vestal (1777) – foundered 1777.
  - Perseus (1776) – broken up 1805.
  - Unicorn (1776) – broken up 1787.
  - Ariel (1777) – captured by the French 1779.
  - Narcissus (1781) – wrecked 1796.
- Porcupine class – 10 ships, with 22 × 9-pdrs, + 2 smaller. 1777–1781.
  - Porcupine (1777) – broken up 1805.
  - Pelican (1777) – wrecked 1781.
  - Eurydice (1781) – broken up 1834.
  - Hyaena (1778) – sold 1802.
  - Penelope (1778) – foundered 1780.
  - Amphitrite (1778) – wrecked 1794.
  - Crocodile (1781) – wrecked 1784.
  - Siren (1779) – wrecked 1781.
  - Pandora (1779) – wrecked 1791.
  - Champion (1779) – sold 1816.
- Myrmidon class – 1 ship, with 20 × 6-pdrs, + 2 smaller. 1781.
  - Myrmidon (1781) – broken up 1811.
- Squirrel class (of 1782 design) – 1 ship, with 22 × 9-pdrs, + 2 × 6-pdrs. 1785.
  - Squirrel (1785) – sold 1817.

=== 19th-century sailing post ship (and subsequently corvette) classes ===
This section lists the 'post ships' of 20 to 24 guns (after 1817, up to 28 guns) which in the 1830s would be merged with the larger sloops to form the new category of corvette. From 1817 the upper limit (in terms of numbers of guns) would be raised to 28 guns.

- Banterer class – 6 ships, with 22 × 9-pdrs, + 10 smaller. 1806–1807
  - Crocodile (1806) – broken up 1816.
  - Daphne (1806) – sold 1816.
  - Cossack (1806) – broken up 1816.
  - Cyane (1806) – captured 1815.
  - Banterer (1807) – wrecked 1808.
  - Porcupine (1807) – sold 1816.
- Laurel class – 6 ships, with 22 × 9-pdrs, + 10 smaller. 1806–1812
  - Boreas (1806) – wrecked 1807.
  - Laurel (1806) – renamed Laurestinus 1810, wrecked 1813.
  - Comus (1806) – wrecked 1816.
  - Garland (1807) – sold 1817.
  - Perseus (1812) – broken up 1850.
  - Volage (1807) – sold 1818.
- Hermes class – 4 ships, 1811–1816
  - Hermes (1811) – burnt in action 1814.
  - Myrmidon (1813) – broken up 1823.
  - Ariadne (1816) – sold 1841.
  - Valorous (1816) – broken up 1829.
- Cyrus class – 16 ships, 1813–1814
  - Medina (1813) – sold 1832.
  - Cyrus (1813) – sold 1823.
  - Levant (1813) – broken up 1820.
  - Esk (1813) – sold 1829.
  - Carron (1813) – wrecked 1820.
  - Tay (1813) – wrecked 1816.
  - Slaney (1813) – broken up 1838.
  - Erne (1813) – wrecked 1819.
  - Leven (1813) – broken up 1848.
  - Falmouth (1814) – sold 1825.
  - Cyrene (1814) – sold 1828.
  - Bann (1814) – sold 1829.
  - Spey (1814) – sold 1822.
  - Lee (1814) – broken up 1822.
  - Hind (1814) – sold 1827.
  - Larne (1814) – sold 1828.
- Conway class – 10 ships, 1814–1817
  - Mersey (1814) – broken up 1852.
  - Eden (1814) – broken up 1833.
  - Conway (1814) – sold 1825.
  - Tamar (1814) – sold 1837.
  - Dee (1814) – sold 1819.
  - Towey (1814) – broken up 1832.
  - Menai (1814) – broken up 1853.
  - Tyne (1814) – sold 1825.
  - Wye (1814) – broken up 1852.
  - Tees (1817) – sold 1872.
- Atholl class – 18 ships (of which 4 cancelled or re-ordered to other designs), 1820–1828
  - Atholl (1820) – broken up 1863.
  - Niemen (1820) – broken up 1828.
  - Ranger (1820) – sold 1832.
  - Rattlesnake (1822) – broken up 1860.
  - North Star (1824) – broken up 1860.
  - Tweed (1823) – sold 1852.
  - Talbot (1824) – sold 1896.
  - Rainbow (1823) – sold 1838.
  - Alligator (1821) – sold 1865.
  - Termagant (1822) – renamed Herald 1824, sold 1862.
  - Samarang (1822) – sold 1883.
  - Andromeda (-) – re-ordered as Nimrod below
  - Success (1825) – broken up 1849.
  - Crocodile (1825) – sold 1861.
  - Alarm (-) – re-ordered as Conway class vessel
  - Daphne (-) – cancelled 1832
  - Porcupine (-) – cancelled 1832
  - Nimrod (1828) – sold 1907.
- Volage – 1 ship, 1825
- Tyne – 1 ship, 1826
- Conway class – 3 ships (of which 1 cancelled), 1832
  - Imogene (1831) (originally Pearl – renamed before launch)
  - Conway (1832)
  - Alarm (-) – cancelled 1832
- Challenger – 1 ship, 1826
- Sapphire – 1 ship, 1826
- Actaeon – 1 ship, 1831
- Andromache class – 5 ships (of which the last 3 were re-ordered as the following Vestal class), 1832–1837
  - Calliope (1837) – broken up 1883.
  - Andromache (1832) – broken up 1875.
- Vestal class – 3 ships, 1833–1836
  - Vestal (1833) – sold 1862.
  - Cleopatra (1835) – sold 1862.
  - Carysfort (1836) – sold 1861.
- Spartan class – 8 ships (of which 2 cancelled), 1840–1845
  - Spartan (1841) – sold 1862.
  - Iris (1840) – sold 1869.
  - Juno (1844) – renamed Mariner 1878, foundered 1880.
  - Creole (1845) – broken up 1875.
  - Amethyst (1844) – sold 1869.
  - Niobe (-) – re-ordered as Diamond-class vessel
  - Malacca (-) – re-ordered as screw ship
  - Alarm (1845) – sold 1904.
- Eurydice – 1 ship, 1843
- Diamond class – 3 ships (of which 1 cancelled), 1848–1849
  - Diamond (1848) – sold 1885.
  - Tribune (-) – completed as a screw frigate.
  - Niobe (1849) – sold 1862 to Prussian Navy.

=== 19th-century screw corvettes ===
- Highflyer class – 2 ships, 1851–1854
  - Highflyer (1851) – broken up 1871.
  - Esk (1854) – broken up 1870.
- Pylades class – 1 ship, 1854
  - Pylades (1854) – sold 1875.
- Cossack class – 2 ships, 1854
  - Cossack (1854) – sold 1875.
  - Tartar (1854) – sold 1866.
- Pearl class – 10 ships, 1855–1858
  - Pearl (1855) – sold 1884.
  - Satellite (1855) – broken up 1879.
  - Cadmus (1856) – broken up 1879.
  - Scout (1856) – broken up 1877.
  - Scylla (1856) – sold 1882.
  - Charybdis (1859) – sold 1884.
  - Pelorus (1857) – broken up 1869.
  - Challenger (1858) – hulked 1880, sold 1921.
  - Racoon (1857) – broken up 1877.
  - Clio (1858) – training ship 1876, sold 1919.
- Jason class – 7 ships (of which 1 cancelled), 1859–1863
  - Jason (1859) – broken up 1877.
  - Barrosa (1860) – broken up 1877.
  - Galatea (-) – completed as a screw frigate.
  - Orpheus (1860) – wrecked 1863.
  - Orestes (1860) – broken up 1866.
  - Rattlesnake (1861) – broken up 1882.
  - Wolverine (1863) – training ship 1881, sold 1923.
- North Star class – 10 ships, 1860 design – all cancelled
- Juno class – 2 ships, 1867–1869
  - Juno (1867) – sold 1887.
  - Thalia (1869) – sold 1920.
- Briton class – 3 ships, 1869–1871
  - Druid (1869)
  - Briton (1869)
  - Thetis (1871)
- Volage class – 2 ships, 1869–1869
  - Volage (1869)
  - Active (1869)
- Amethyst class – 5 ships, 1873–1874
  - Encounter (1873)
  - Amethyst (1873)
  - Modeste (1873)
  - Diamond (1874)
  - Sapphire (1874)
- Rover (1874)
- Emerald class – 6 ships, 1875–1877
  - Opal (1875)
  - Turquoise (1876)
  - Ruby (1876)
  - Tourmaline (1875)
  - Emerald (1876)
  - Garnet (1877)
- Bacchante class – 3 ships, 1875–1877
  - Boadicea (1875)
  - Bacchante (1876)
  - Euryalus (1877)
- Comus class – 9 ships, 1878–1881
  - Comus (1878)
  - Curacoa (1878)
  - Champion (1878)
  - Cleopatra (1878)
  - Carysfort (1878)
  - Conquest (1878)
  - Constance (1880)
  - Canada (1881)
  - Cordelia (1881)
- Calypso class – 2 ships, 1883–1884
  - Calypso (1883)
  - Calliope (1884)

=== World War II corvettes ===
After more than half a century, the category of corvette was revived during World War II to designate a smaller form of escort vessel than the existing sloops. It was thus not comparable with the pre-1887 corvettes in the Royal Navy. Two classes of wartime corvette were designed and built in considerable numbers (see separate articles):

- Flower class – 267 ships, 1939–1945
- Castle class – 44 ships, 1943–1944

== Sloop classes ==
What became the sloop category in the Royal Navy evolved over the later part of the 17th century from a range of minor craft, notably the ketch with which the Navy was amply provided for auxiliary purposes.

=== Two-masted sloops of the Restoration period ===
Seventeen "double shallops after the French manner" of various sizes were built in the Royal Dockyards in 1672-73, eight by Jomas Shish at Deptford, four by Anthony Deane at Portsmouth, three by Sir Phineas Pett II at Chatham, and two by the Shipwright's Assistant at Woolwich. Contemporary illustrations usually show them as two-masted, with square fore and main courses and a main or fore topsail.

- Deptford group, 1672-73
  - Lilly (1672)
  - Swallow (1672)
  - Tulip (1672)
  - Dove (1672)
  - Whipster (1672)
  - Lizard (1673)
  - Dolphin (1673)
  - Vulture (1673)
- Portsmouth group, 1672-73
  - Prevention (1672)
  - Cutter (1673)
  - Hunter (1673)
  - Invention (1673)
- Chatham group, 1673
  - Chatham (1673)
  - Chatham Double (1673)
  - Hound (1673)
- Woolwich group, 1673
  - Bonetta (1673)
  - Woolwich (1673)
- Bonetta group, 1699
  - Bonetta (1699)
  - Shark (1699)
  - Probibition (1699)
  - Merlin (1699)
  - Swallow (1699)
  - Fox (1699)
  - Swift (1699)
  - Wolf (1699)
- Hound group, 1700
  - Hound (1700)
  - Otter (1700)

=== Sloops (early single-masted type) ===
Note that early sloops were single-masted, including (initially) the Swift, Jamaica, and Hazard groups listed below for 1700–1711; however, all surviving sloops by 1716 had been re-rigged as two-masted, and all new sloops continued to be two-masted until the 1750s, when three-masted – ship-rigged – sloops were introduced.

- Swift group – 3 vessels, 1704
  - Swift (1704) – sold 1719.
  - Ferret (1704) – captured 1706 by French.
  - Weazle (1704) – sold 1712.
- Jamaica group – 4 vessels, 1709–1711
  - Jamaica (1709) – wrecked 1715.
  - Trial (1709) – rebuilt 1719.
  - Ferret (1711) – captured by Spanish 1718.
  - Shark (1711) – rebuilt 1722.
- Hazard group – 2 vessels, 1711
  - Hazard (1711) – wrecked 1714.
  - Happy (1711) – rebuilt 1724–25.

=== Two-masted sloops (to 1732) ===
All early two-masted sloops were mainly either ketch-rigged or snow-rigged.

- Drake – 1 brig-rigged vessel, 1705 – rebuilt 1728
- Trial – 1 vessel, 1719 (rebuilt from 1709 vessel) – BU 1731.
- Bonetta group – 2 vessels, 1721
  - Bonetta (1721) – sold 1731.
  - Ferret (1721) – sold 1731.
- Otter group – 2 vessels, 1721
  - Otter (1721) – wrecked 1742.
  - Swift (1721) – sold 1741.
- Cruizer group – 4 vessels, 1721
  - Cruizer (1721) – BU 1732.
  - Weazle (1721) – sold 1732.
  - Hawk (1721) – foundered 1739.
  - Spy (1721) – sold 1731.
- Shark group – 2 vessels, 1723–1725
  - Shark (1723) – sold 1732.
  - Happy (1725) – sold 1735.
- Spence – 1 vessel, 1723 – BU 1730.
- Drake class – 2 vessels, 1729
  - Drake (1729) – BU 1740.
  - Spence (1729) – sold 1749.
- Grampus – 1 vessel, 1731 – foundered 1742.
- Wolf – 1 vessel, 1731 – wrecked 1741.
- Bonetta group – 8 vessels, 1732
  - Shark (1732) – sold 1755.
  - Bonetta (1732) – wrecked 1744.
  - Fly (1732) – BU 1751.
  - Spy (1732) – sold 1745.
  - Saltash (1732) – sold 1741.
  - Cruizer (1732) – sold 1745.
  - Hound (1732) – BU 1745.
  - Trial (1732) – scuttled 1741.

=== Two-masted sloops (1739 to 1745) ===
From the outbreak of the War of Jenkins' Ear in 1739, the Navy recognised that there was a growing need for smaller vessels for amphibious operations, as escorts for commercial traffic, and for minor combatant roles. Over the next six years, some 36 specialist vessels were procured (34 designed by the Navy and 2 purchased on the stocks where builders had begun them as speculative ventures), as listed below; of these, the first four were essentially repeats of the previous group of 200-ton sloops of 1732, while the later vessels were progressively enlarged. In addition, a small number were captured from the Spanish during this era, and a dozen bomb vessels of similar construction supplemented the purpose-built sloops in a cruising role.

- Drake class – 3 vessels, 1741
  - Drake (1741) – wrecked 1742.
  - Hawk (1741) – BU 1747.
  - Swift (1741) – lost 1756.
- Purchased vessel – Saltash (1741) – burned 1742
- Wolf class – 3 vessels, 1742–1743
  - Wolf (1742) – wrecked 1748.
  - Otter (1742) – sold 1763.
  - Grampus (1743) – captured by the French 1744.
- Baltimore class – 3 vessels, 1742–1743
  - Baltimore (1742) – sold 1762.
  - Saltash (1742) – capsized 1746.
  - Drake (1743) – sold 1748.
- Purchased vessel – Ferret (1743) – foundered 1757
- Merlin class – 21 vessels, 1744–1747
  - Swallow (1744) – wrecked 1744.
  - Merlin (1744) – sold 1748.
  - Speedwell (1744) – sold 1750.
  - Falcon (1744) – captured by French 1745, retaken 1746 and renamed Fortune, sold 1770.
  - Hazard (1744) – sold 1749.
  - Lizard (1744) – wrecked 1748.
  - Hinchingbrooke (1745) – captured by French 1746.
  - Tavistock (1745) – renamed Albany 1747, sold 1763.
  - Hound (1745) – sold 1773.
  - Hornet (1745) – sold 1770.
  - Raven (1745) – sold 1763.
  - Swan (1745) – sold 1763.
  - Badger (1745) – wrecked 1762.
  - Falcon (1745) – wrecked 1759.
  - Scorpion (1746) – wrecked 1762.
  - Swallow (1745) – sold 1769.
  - Kingfisher (1745) – sold 1763.
  - Dispatch (1745) – sold 1773.
  - Viper (1746) – renamed Lightning as fireship 1755, sold 1762.
  - Grampus (1746) – converted to fireship 1762, renamed Strombolo 1771, sold 1780.
  - Saltash (1745) – sold 1773.
- Hind class – 4 vessels, 1744
  - Hind (1744) – foundered 1747.
  - Vulture (1744) – sold 1761.
  - Jamaica (1744) – wrecked 1770.
  - Trial (1744) – BU 1776.

=== Two-masted sloops (1749 to 1770) ===
- Wasp group – 4 vessels, 1749–1750
  - Wasp (1749) – sold 1781.
  - Peggy (1749) – wrecked 1770.
  - Hazard (1749) – sold 1783.
  - Savage (1750) – wrecked 1776.
- Fly class – 2 vessels, 1752
  - Ranger (1752) – sold 1783.
  - Fly (1752) – sold 1772.
- Cruizer class – 4 vessels, 1752–1754
  - Speedwell (1752) – sold 1780.
  - Cruizer (1752) – burned 1776.
  - Happy (1754) – wrecked 1766.
  - Wolf (1754) – sold 1781.
- Hawk – 1 vessel, 1756 – sold 1781.
- Bonetta class – 3 vessels, 1756
  - Bonetta (1756) – sold 1776.
  - Merlin (1756) – burned 1780.
  - Spy (1756) – sold 1773.
- Hunter class – 2 vessels, 1756
  - Hunter (1756) – sold 1780.
  - Viper (1756) – wrecked 1779.
- Alderney class – 3 vessels, 1756–1757. Although designed and begun as two-masted sloops, Stork and Alderney were completed as three-masted ships.
  - Stork (1756) – taken 1758 by the French.
  - Alderney (1757) – sold 1783.
  - Diligence (1756) – sold 1780.
- Druid class – 2 vessels, 1761. Although designed as two-masted sloops, both vessels were later reported as three-masted (ship-rigged).
  - Druid (1761) – sunk as a breakwater 1773.
  - Lynx (1761) – sold 1777.

=== Ship-rigged sloops (1745–88) ===
Ship sloops (i.e. sloops carrying three masts, and rigged as ships) were built frigate-style, and initially were referred to as frigates, in spite of their size and relative lack of guns.

- Purchased sloops 1745–46
  - Weazel (1745) purchased on the stocks
  - Porcupine (1746) purchased on the stocks
- Favourite class – 3 ships (including 1 cancelled), 1757–1758
  - Favourite (1757)
  - Tamar (1758)
  - Flora – cancelled 1761
- Purchased sloops 1757
  - Merlin (1757)
  - Racehorse (1757)
  - Pelican (1757)
  - Roman Emperor (1757)
- Ferret class – 1 ship, 1760
  - Ferret (1760)
- Senegal class – 1 ship, 1760
  - Senegal (1760)
- Beaver class – 2 ships, 1761
  - Beaver (1761)
  - Martin (1761)
- Modified Favourite class – 1 ship, 1762
  - Nautilus (1762)
- Swift class – 2 ships, 1763. Begun as two-masted vessels but completed with three-masted (ship)rig.
  - Swift (1763)
  - Vulture (1763)
- Otter class – 1 ship, 1767
  - Otter (1767)
- Swallow class – 2 ships, 1769–1771
  - Swallow (1769)
  - Falcon (1771)
- Swan class – 25 ships, 1766–1780
  - Swan (1767)
  - Kingfisher (1770)
  - Cygnet (1776)
  - Atalanta (1775)
  - Pegasus (1776)
  - Fly (1776)
  - Swift (1777)
  - Dispatch (1777)
  - Fortune (1777)
  - Hound (1776)
  - Hornet (1776)
  - Vulture (1776)
  - Spy (1776)
  - Cormorant (1776)
  - Zebra (1777)
  - Cameleon (1777)
  - Fairy (1778)
  - Nymph (1778)
  - Savage (1778)
  - Fury (1779)
  - Delight (1778)
  - Thorn (1779)
  - Bonetta (1779)
  - Shark (1779)
  - Alligator (1780)
- Purchased ship sloops – 2 ships, 1771
  - Raven (1771)
  - Scorpion (1771)
- Ceres class – 1 ship, 1777
  - Ceres (1777)
- Purchased ship sloops – 1 ship, 1780
  - Termagant (1780) – Corvette, purchased on the Stocks while building by Hillhouse at Bristol, 22 × 6-pdrs and 4 × 12-pdr carronades, reduced to an 18-gun Ship-Sloop in 1782, 1795 sold.
- Zebra class – 3 ships, 1780–1782 (a fourth was cancelled)
  - Zebra (1780)
  - Ariel (1781)
  - Bulldog (1782)
  - Serpent cancelled 1783
- Inspector class – 1 ship, 1782
  - Inspector (1782)
- Echo class – 6 ships, 1782–1785, designed by Edward Hunt and armed with sixteen 6-pounders on the upper deck and six 12-pounder carronades on the quarterdeck, with a further two on the forecastle
  - Echo (1782) – broken up 1797
  - Rattler (1783) – sold 1792
  - Calypso (1783) – sank after being rammed by a merchantman in the Atlantic in August 1803
  - Brisk (1784) – sold 1805
  - Nautilus (1784) – wrecked off Flamborough Head on 2 February 1799
  - Scorpion (1785) – sold 1802

=== Brig-rigged sloops (1778–84) ===
- Childers class – 1 vessel, 1778
  - Childers (1778)
- Purchased brigs 1779–82 – 11 vessels purchased on stocks
  - Swallow (1779)
  - Drake (1779)
  - Zephyr (1779)
  - Scourge (1779)
  - Lively (1779)
  - Alert (1779)
  - Scout (1780)
  - Fortune (1780)
  - Swallow (1781)
  - Wasp (1782)
  - Kingfisher (1782)
- Purchased brigs 1781 – 2 vessels purchased from mercantile service
  - Cameleon (1781)
  - Swan (1781)
- Speedy class – 2 ships, 1782
  - Speedy (1782)
  - Flirt (1782)
- Modified Childers class – 4 ships, 1782–1784
  - Falcon (1782)
  - Otter (1782)
  - Weazel (1783)
  - Ferret (1784)

=== Ship-rigged sloops (1788 to 1815) ===
- Hound class – 5 ship sloops, 1789–1791
  - Hound (1790)
  - Martin (1790)
  - Rattlesnake (1791)
  - Fury (1790)
  - Serpent (1789)
- Hawk class – 2 ship sloops, 1793
  - Hawk (1793)
  - Swift (1793)
- Pylades class – 6 ship sloops, 1793–1795
  - Pylades (1794)
  - Alert (1793)
  - Albacore (1793)
  - Peterel (1794)
  - Ranger (1794)
  - Rattler (1795)
- Cormorant class – 7 ship-sloops, 1794–1796; a second batch of 24 ship sloops (including 1 cancelled) followed 1804–1806
  - Cormorant (1794)
  - Favourite (1794)
  - Hornet (1794 sloop-of-war)
  - Lynx (1794)
  - Lark (1794)
  - Hazard (1794)
  - Stork (1796)
  - Hyacinth (1806)
  - Sabrina (1806)
  - Herald (1806)
  - Anacreon (1813)
  - Rosamund (1807)
  - Fawn (1807)
  - Acorn (1807)
  - Racoon (1808)
  - North Star (1810)
  - Myrtle (1807)
  - Hesper (1809)
  - Cherub (1806)
  - Minstrel (1807)
  - Wanderer (1806)
  - Sapphire (1806)
  - Blossom (1806)
  - Partridge (1809)
  - Egeria (1807)
  - Tweed (1807)
  - Favourite (1806)
  - Ranger (1807)
  - Jalouse (1809)
  - Serpent – cancelled
  - Dauntless (1808)
- Dart class – 2 experimental ship sloops, designed by Samuel Bentham, 1796, with 24 32-pounder Carronades on gun deck and 2 32-pounder Carronades each on quarterdeck and forecastle
  - Dart (1796) – broken up 1809
  - Arrow (1796) – taken by the French Frigates Hortense and Incorruptible on 4 February 1805, but sank on the same day due to the damage it had sustained.
- Bittern class – 5 ship sloops, 1796 (except Brazen in 1808)
  - Bittern (1796)
  - Cyane (1796)
  - Plover (1796)
  - Termagant (1796)
  - Brazen (1808)
- Merlin class – 2 ship sloops, 1796–1798; a second batch of 14 ship sloops followed 1804–1806.
  - Merlin (1796)
  - Pheasant (1798)
  - Cygnet (1804)
  - Ariel (1806)
  - Kingfisher (1804)
  - Helena (1804)
  - Albacore (1804)
  - Wolf (1804)
  - Fly (1804)
  - Otter (1805)
  - Kangaroo (1805)
  - Martin (1805)
  - Rose (1805)
  - Brisk (1805)
  - Starr (1805)
  - Halifax (1806)
- Purchased ship-sloops – 2 Bermuda-built ship sloops, 1795.
  - Hunter (1795)
  - Rover (1795)
- Dasher class – 2 Bermuda-built ship sloops, 1797.
  - Dasher (1797)
  - Driver (1797)
- Echo class – 1 ship sloop, 1797.
  - Echo (1797)
- Osprey class – 1 ship sloop, 1797.
  - Osprey (1797)
- Snake class – 2 ship sloops, 1797–1798.
  - Snake (1797)
  - Victor (1798)
- Purchased ship sloops – 20 ships, 1803–1804
  - Merlin (1803)
  - Curlew (1803)
  - Vulture (1803)
  - Hermes (1803)
  - Speedy (1803)
  - Orestes (1803)
  - Inspector (1803)
  - Bonetta (1803)
  - Avenger (1803) (i)
  - Drake (1804)
  - Avenger (1804) (ii)
  - Alert (1804)
  - Espiegle (1804)
  - Railleur (1804)
  - Cormorant (1804)
  - Utile (1804)
  - Eugenie (1804)
  - Spy (1804)
  - Heron (1804)
  - Anacreon (1804)
- Combatant class – 3 ship sloops, 1804.
  - Valorous (1804)
  - Dauntless (1804)
  - Combatant (1804)
- Bermuda class – 6 Bermuda-built ship sloops, 1805–1812.
  - Indian (1805)
  - Bermuda (1806)
  - Atalante (1808)
  - Martin (1809)
  - Morgiana (1811)
  - Sylph (1812)

=== Brig-rigged sloops (1788 to 1815) ===
This table excludes the small gun-brigs (of less than 200 burthen tons) that were built in considerable numbers during this period: for these gun-brigs see List of gun-brigs of the Royal Navy

- Albatross class – 8 brig-sloops, 1795–1796
  - Pelican (1795)
  - Kite (1795)
  - Dispatch (1795)
  - Albatross (1795)
  - Raven (1796)
  - Star (1795)
  - Sylph (1795)
  - Swallow (1795)
- Diligence class – 8 brig-sloops, 1795–1796
  - Curlew (1795)
  - Diligence (1795)
  - Seagull (1795)
  - Harpy (1796)
  - Hound (1796)
  - Kangaroo (1795)
  - Cameleon (1795)
  - Racoon (1795)
- Busy class (brig-rigged version of the Echo-class ship sloop) – 1 brig-sloop, 1797.
  - Busy (1797)
- Cruizer class (brig-rigged version of the Snake-class ship sloops) – 107 brig-sloops, 1797–1815
  - see full list of Cruizer class brig-sloops under article Cruizer-class brig-sloop.
- Seagull class – 13 brig-sloops, 1805–1806
  - Seagull (1805)
  - Oberon (1805)
  - Imogen (1805)
  - Nightingale (1805)
  - Savage (1805)
  - Skylark (1806)
  - Paulina (1805)
  - Delight (1806)
  - Orestes (1805)
  - Electra (1806)
  - Julia (1806)
  - Satellite (1806)
  - Sheldrake (1806)
- Fly class – 7 brig-sloops, 1805–1806
  - Kite (1805)
  - Sparrow (1805)
  - Fly (1805)
  - Raven (1805)
  - Wizard (1805)
  - Goshawk (1806)
  - Challenger (1806)
- Crocus class – 10 brig-sloops, 1808–1814
  - Podargus (1808)
  - Crocus (1808)
  - Merope (1808)
  - Apelles (1808)
  - Portia (1810)
  - Prospero (1809)
  - Muros (1809)
  - Zephyr (1809)
  - Banterer (1810)
  - Wolf (1814)
- Cherokee class – 114 brig-sloops, 1808–1830
  - full list.
- Rapid class – 1 brig-sloop, 1808.
  - Rapid (1808)
- Primrose class – 1 brig-sloop, 1810.
  - Primrose (1810)
- Icarus class – 1 brig-sloop, 1814.
  - Icarus (1814)

=== Ship-rigged sloops (after 1816) ===
- Rose class – 1 ship-sloop, 1821
  - Rose (1821)
- Martin class – 1 ship-sloop, 1821
  - Martin (1821)
- Comet class – 3 ship-sloops, 1828–1837
  - Comet (1828)
  - Lightning (1829)
  - Electra (1837)
- Orestes class – 1 ship-sloop, 1824
  - Orestes (1824)
- Pylades class – 1 ship-sloop, 1824
  - Pylades (1824)
- Snake class (revival of 1797 design) – 2 ship-sloops, 1827–1828
  - Childers (1827)
  - Cruiser (1828)
- Favorite class – 4 ship-sloops, 1829–1837
  - Favorite (1829)
  - Hyacinth (1829)
  - Racehorse (1830)
  - Hazard (1837)
- Champion class – 1 ship-sloop, 1824
  - Champion (1824)
- Pearl class – 1 ship-sloop, 1828
  - Pearl (1828)
- Wolf class – 1 ship-sloop, 1826
  - Wolf (1826)
- Satellite class – 2 ship-sloops, 1826
  - Satellite (1826)
  - Acorn (1826)
- Scout class – 3 ship-sloops (2 cancelled), 1832
  - Scout (1832)
  - Pheasant cancelled 1831
  - Redwing cancelled 1831
- Rover class – 1 ship-sloop, 1832
  - Rover (1832)
- Fly class – 4 ship-sloops (2 cancelled), 1831
  - Fly (1831)
  - Harrier (1831)
  - Argus cancelled 1831
  - Acorn cancelled 1831
- Daphne class – 4 ship-sloops (1 cancelled), 1836–1845, later re-classed as corvettes.
  - Dido (1836)
  - Daphne (1838)
  - Calypso (1845)
  - Coquette cancelled 1851
- Modeste class – 1 ship-sloop, 1837, later re-classed as corvette.
  - Dido (1836)
- Challenger class – 1 ship-sloop (cancelled).
  - Challenger cancelled 1849
- Arachne class – 3 ship-sloops (1 cancelled), 1847, later re-classed as corvettes.
  - Arachne (1847)
  - Terpsichore (1847)
  - Narcissus cancelled 1847

=== Brig-rigged sloops (after 1816) ===
Between 1815 and 1826 numerous additional brig-sloops of the wartime Cherokee class were ordered; these have been included with the numbers mentioned in the previous section.

- Columbine class – 1 brig-sloop, 1826
  - Columbine (1826)
- Pantaloon class – 1 brig-sloop, purchased 1831
  - Pantaloon (1831)
- Snake class – 2 brig-sloops, 1832
  - Snake (1832)
  - Serpent (1832)
- Pandora class – 8 brig-sloops (1 cancelled), 1833–1847
  - Pandora (1833)
  - Bonetta (1836)
  - Dolphin (1838)
  - Spy (1841)
  - Rapid (1840)
  - Sealark (1843)
  - Dart (1847)
  - Daring cancelled 1843
- Racer class – 9 brig-sloops, 1833–1853
  - Harlequin (1836)
  - Racer (1833)
  - Ringdove (1833)
  - Wanderer (1835)
  - Wolverene (1836)
  - Sappho (1837)
  - Lily (1837)
  - Liberty (1850)
  - Squirrel (1853)
- Alert class – 18 brig-sloops (4 cancelled), 1835–1846
  - Star (1835)
  - Ranger (1835)
  - Linnet (1835)
  - Alert (1835)
  - Express (1835)
  - Swift (1835)
  - Penguin (1838)
  - Peterel (1838)
  - Crane (1839)
  - Cygnet (1840)
  - Ranger (1840)
  - Dispatch cancelled 1839
  - Dove cancelled 1839
  - Philomel (1842)
  - Heroine (1841)
  - Hound (1846)
  - Mariner cancelled 1839
  - Martin cancelled 1839
- Waterwitch class – 1 brig-sloop, 1834
  - Waterwitch (1834)
- Acorn class – 14 brig-sloops, 1838–1852
  - Grecian (1838)
  - Fantome (1839)
  - Pilot (1838)
  - Acorn (1838)
  - Arab (1847)
  - Persian (1839)
  - Bittern (1840)
  - Albatross (1842)
  - Elk (1847)
  - Heron (1847)
  - Mariner (1846)
  - Despatch (1851)
  - Martin (1850)
  - Kangaroo (1852)
- Helena class – 7 first class brigs, 1841–1853
  - Siren (1841)
  - Helena (1843)
  - Jumna (1848)
  - Atalanta (1847)
  - Camilla (1847)
  - Musquito (1851)
  - Rover (1853)
- Frolic class – 1 first-class brig, 1842
  - Frolic (1842)
- Experimental brigs – 9 third-class brigs (to 8 different designs), 1844–1847
  - Daring (1844)
  - Mutine (1844)
  - Flying Fish (1844)
  - Kingfisher (1845)
  - Osprey (1844)
  - Espiegle (1844)
  - Britomart (1847)
  - Recruit (1846) – iron-hulled
  - Contest (1846)
- Nerbudda class – 1 second-class brig, 1848
  - Nerbudda (1848)

=== Paddle-driven sloops ===
These vessels were initially rated as steam vessels until 1844, when the category of steam sloops was created.

- Messenger class – originally built for private use and purchased in 1830, classed as packets until 1831
  - Messenger (1830)
  - Hermes (1830)
- Dee class
  - Dee (1832)
- Batch of 4 ordered in January 1831
  - Salamander (1832)
  - Phoenix (1832)
  - Rhadamanthus (1832)
  - Medea (1833)
- Hermes class
  - Hermes (1835)
  - Volcano (1836)
  - Megaera (1837)
  - Acheron (1838)
- Gorgon class
  - Gorgon (1837)
- Hydra class
  - Hydra (1838)
  - Hecla (1839)
  - Hecate (1839)
- Merlin class – originally classed as packets
  - Merlin (1838)
  - Medusa (1838)
  - Medina (1840)
- Stromboli class – improved Gorgon
  - Stromboli (1839)
  - Vesuvius (1839)
- Alecto class – 5 third-class sloops (1 cancelled), 1839–1841
  - Alecto (1839)
  - Prometheus (1839)
  - Polyphemus (1840)
  - Ardent (1841)
  - Rattler cancelled, re-ordered as screw sloop 1842
- Driver class – 12 first-class sloops, 1840–1846
  - Driver (1840)
  - Styx (1841)
  - Vixen (1841)
  - Devastation (1841)
  - Geyser (1841)
  - Growler (1841)
  - Thunderbolt (1842)
  - Cormorant (1842)
  - Spiteful (1842)
  - Eclair (1843)
  - Virago (1842)
  - Sphinx (1846)
- Bulldog class – 4 first-class sloops, 1844–1845, lengthened Driver
  - Inflexible (1845)
  - Scourge (1844)
  - Bulldog (1845)
  - Fury (1845)
- Janus class – 1 first-class sloop, 1844
  - Janus (1844)
- Trident class – 1 third-class sloop (iron-hulled), 1845
  - Trident (1845)
- Antelope class – 3 third-class sloops (iron-hulled), 1846–1847
  - Antelope (1846)
  - Oberon (1847)
  - Triton (1846)
- Basilisk class – 1 first-class sloop, 1848
  - Basilisk (1848)
- Buzzard class – 1 second-class sloop, 1849
  - Buzzard (1849)
- Argus class – 1 second-class sloop, 1849, modified Alecto
  - Argus (1849)
- Barracouta class – 1 second-class sloop, 1851
  - Barracouta (1851)

=== 19th-century screw sloops (to 1903) ===
- Rattler (1843) – sold 1856.
- Phoenix (1845 conversion from paddle sloop of 1832) – sold 1864.
- Encounter class – 2 ships (second cancelled), 1846.
  - Encounter (1846) – broken up 1866.
  - Harrier (-) – cancelled 1851.
- Niger class – 2 ships (second cancelled), 1846.
  - Niger (1846) – sold 1869.
  - Florentia (-) – cancelled 1849.
- Conflict class – 4 ships (second pair cancelled), 1846–1849.
  - Conflict (1846) – sold 1863.
  - Desperate (1849) – broken up 1865.
  - Enchantress (-) – cancelled 1851.
  - Falcon (-) – cancelled 1851.
- Plumper (1848) – sold 1865.
- Reynard (1848) – wrecked 1851.
- Archer class – 2 ships, 1849–1850.
  - Archer (1849) – sold 1866.
  - Wasp (1850) – sold 1869.
- Miranda (1851) – sold 1869.
- Brisk (1851) – sold 1870.
- Malacca (1853) – sold 1869.

In 1852 six of the screw sloops (Archer, Brisk, Encounter, Malacca, Miranda and Niger) were reclassed as corvettes, while four others (Conflict, Desperate, Phoenix and Wasp) remained sloops.

- Cruizer class – 6 ships, 1852–1856.
  - Cruizer (1852) – training ship Lark 1893; sold 1912.
  - Hornet (1854) – sold 1868.
  - Harrier (1854) – broken up 1866.
  - Fawn (1856) – sold 1884.
  - Falcon (1854) – sold 1869.
  - Alert (1856) – loaned to US Navy and then Canadian Government 1884.
- Swallow class – 4 ships, 1854–1866.
  - Curlew (1854) – sold 1865.
  - Swallow (1854) – sold 1866.
  - Ariel (1854) – sold 1865.
  - Lyra (1857) – broken up 1876.
- Racer class – 5 ships, 1856–1860.
  - Cordelia (1856) – sold 1870.
  - Racer (1857) – broken up 1876.
  - Gannet (1857) – broken up 1877.
  - Icarus (1858) – sold 1875.
  - Pantaloon (1860) – sold 1867.
- Greyhound class – 2 ships, 1859.
  - Greyhound (1859) – harbour service 1869, sold 1906.
  - Mutine (1859) – sold 1870.
- Camelion class – 8 ships, 1860–1866 (another 8 cancelled).
  - Camelion (1860) – sold 1883.
  - Pelican (1860) – sold 1867.
  - Rinaldo (1860) – sold 1884.
  - Zebra (1860) – sold 1873.
  - Perseus (1861) – training ship 1886, renamed Defiance II 1904, sold 1931.
  - Chanticleer (1861) – sold 1875.
  - Reindeer (1866) – broken up 1876.
  - Rattler (1862) – wrecked 1868.

[the 8 vessels cancelled in 1863–64 were Harlequin, Tees, Sappho, Trent, Circassian, Diligence, Imogene, and Success – although 2 were completed as the ironclads Research and Enterprise.]

- Rosario class – 7 ships, 1860–1862 (another 6 cancelled).
  - Rosario (1860) – sold 1884.
  - Peterel (1860) – hulked 1885, sold 1901.
  - Rapid (1860) – broken up 1881.
  - Shearwater (1861) – broken up 1877.
  - Royalist (1861) – broken up 1875.
  - Columbine (1862) – broken up 1875.
  - Africa (1862) – Sold to Chinese Imperial Customs in 1862, renamed China and sailed to join Sherard Osborn's "Vampire Fleet".

[the 6 vessels cancelled in 1863 were Circassian, Acheron, Bittern, Fame, Cynthia, and Sabrina.]

- Amazon class – 6 ships, 1865–1866.
  - Amazon (1865) – sunk in collision 1866.
  - Vestal (1865) – sold 1884.
  - Niobe (1866) – wrecked 1874.
  - Dryad (1866) – sold 1886.
  - Daphne (1866) – sold 1882.
  - Nymphe (1866) – sold 1884.
- Eclipse class – 7 ships, 1867–1870
  - Danae (1867) – hulked 1886, sold 1906.
  - Blanche (1867) – sold 1886.
  - Eclipse (1867) – hulked 1888, sold 1921.
  - Sirius (1868) – sold 1885.
  - Spartan (1868) – sold 1882.
  - Dido (1869) – hulked 1886, renamed Actaeon II 1906; sold 1922.
  - Tenedos (1870) – sold 1887.
- Fantome class – 6 ships, 1873–1874
  - Fantome (1873) – sold 1889
  - Albatross (1873) – scrapped 1889
  - Daring (1874) – sold 1889
  - Egeria (1873) – sold 1911
  - Flying Fish (1873) – sold 1888
  - Sappho (1873) – sold 1887
- Osprey class – 5 ships, 1876–1877
  - Wild Swan (1876) – base ship 1904 (renamed Clyde), sold 1920.
  - Penguin (1876) – survey ship 1890, to Australia 1913, sold 1924.
  - Osprey (1876) – sold 1890.
  - Pelican (1877) – sold 1901.
  - Cormorant (1877) – hulked 1889, renamed Rooke 1946, broken up 1949.
- Doterel class – improved Osprey class, 9 ships, 1878–1880
  - Dragon (1878) – sold 1892.
  - Pegasus (1878) – sold 1892.
  - Gannet (1878) – training ship 1903, renamed President 1903 then Mercury 1913; preserved at Chatham 1890.
  - Phoenix (1879) – wrecked 1882.
  - Miranda (1879) – survey vessel 1883, sold 1892.
  - Kingfisher (1879) – training ship 1892, renamed Lark 1892 then Cruizer 1893; sold 1919.
  - Doterel (1880) – sank in accidental explosion 1881.
  - Mutine (1880) – boom defence vessel 1899, renamed Azov 1904; sold 1921.
  - Espiegle (1880) – boom defence vessel 1899, renamed Argo 1904; sold 1921.
- Satellite class – 7 ships, 1881–1884 – reclassed as corvettes 1884.
  - Satellite (1881) – drill ship 1904, sold 1947.
  - Heroine (1881) – sold 1902.
  - Hyacinth (1881) – sold 1902.
  - Royalist (1883) – hulked 1900, sold 1948.
  - Rapid (1883) – hulked 1906, sold 1948.
  - Caroline (1882) – hulked 1897, sold 1929.
  - Pylades (1884) – sold 1906.
- Nymphe class – 4 ships, 1885–1888
  - Swallow (1885) – sold 1904.
  - Buzzard (1887) – drill ship 1904, renamed President 1911, sold 1921.
  - Daphne (1888) – sold 1904.
  - Nymphe (1888) – base ship 1906, sold 1920.
- Beagle class – 2 ships, 1889
  - Basilisk (1889) – sold 1905.
  - Beagle (1889) – sold 1905.
- Alert class – 2 ships, 1894
  - Alert (1894) – sold 1926.
  - Torch (1894) – sold 1920.
- Phoenix class – 2 ships, 1895
  - Phoenix (1895) – foundered 1906.
  - Algerine (1895) – wrecked 1924.
- Condor class – 6 ships, 1898–1900
  - Condor (1898) – foundered 1901.
  - Rosario (1898) – sold 1921.
  - Mutine (1900) – sold 1932.
  - Rinaldo (1900) – sold 1921.
  - Shearwater (1900) – sold 1922.
  - Vestal (1900) – sold 1921.
- Cadmus class – 6 ships, 1901–1903
  - Espiegle (1900) – sold 1923.
  - Fantome (1901) – sold 1925.
  - Merlin (1901) – sold 1923.
  - Odin (1901) – sold 1920.
  - Clio (1903) – sold 1920.
  - Cadmus (1903) – sold 1921.

=== World War I sloops ===
- Flower classes of "convoy sloops"
  - Acacia class – 24 ships, 1915
  - Azalea class – 12 ships, 1915
  - Arabis class – 36 ships, 1915–1916
  - Aubrietia class – 12 ships, 1916–1917
  - Anchusa class – 28 ships, 1917–1918
- P class – 45 ships, 1915–1917
- Kil class – 81 ships, 1917–1919
- PC class "Q-ships" – 19 ships, 1917–1918
- 24 class – 22 ships, 1918–1919

=== Inter-war sloops ===
- Bridgewater class – 2 ships, 1928
- Hastings class – 4 ships (+1 Royal Indian Navy), 1930
- Shoreham class – 8 ships, 1930–1932
- Grimsby class – 8 ships (+4 Royal Australian Navy, 1 Royal Indian Navy), 1933–1940
- Kingfisher class – 9 ships, 1934–1939
- Bittern class – 3 ships (+4 Royal Indian Navy), 1934–1943
- Egret class – 3 ships, 1938

=== World War II sloops ===
- Black Swan class – 4 ships, 1939–1941
- Modified Black Swan class – 30 ships (+4 Royal Indian Navy, 5 cancelled), 1940–1945
- Banff class – 10 ships, ex-United States Coast Guard cutters, 1927–1931

== Book sources ==
- Lyon, David & Winfield, Rif (2004). The Sail and Steam Navy List: All the Ships of the Royal Navy 1815–1889. Chatham Publishing. ISBN 978-1-86176-032-6. OCLC 52620555.
- Rif Winfield, British Warships in the Age of Sail 1714–1792: Design, Construction, Careers and Fates (Seaforth Publishing, 2007).
- Rif Winfield, British Warships in the Age of Sail 1793–1817: Design, Construction, Careers and Fates (Chatham Publishing, 2005)
- Rif Winfield, British Warships in the Age of Sail 1817–1863: Design, Construction, Careers and Fates (Seaforth Publishing, 2014) ISBN 978-1-84832-169-4
- Rif Winfield, British Warships in the Age of Sail 1603–1714: Design, Construction, Careers and Fates (Seaforth Publishing, 2009) ISBN 978-1-5267-9328-7
