= 1719 Establishment Group =

Group of Royal Navy sixth-rate ships, built 1720s

Class overview
- Name: 1719 Establishment Group
- Builders: Woolwich Dockyard; Portsmouth Dockyard; Deptford Dockyard; Chatham Dockyard; Sheerness Dockyard; Plymouth Dockyard
- Operators: Royal Navy
- Preceded by: Gibraltar Group
- Succeeded by: Modified 1719 Establishment Group
- Built: 1722–1727
- In service: 1727–1749
- Completed: 20
- Lost: 1
- Retired: 19

General characteristics
- Type: 20-gun sixth rate
- Tons burthen: 374 49/94 bm
- Length: 106 ft 0 in (32.3 m) gundeck; 87 ft 9 in (26.7 m) keel for tonnage
- Beam: 28 ft 4 in (8.6 m) for tonnage
- Depth of hold: 9 ft 2 in (2.8 m)
- Sail plan: ship-rigged
- Armament: 20 × 6-pdr 19 cwt guns on wooden trucks (UD)

The 1719 Establishment Group of sixth rates defined the 20-gun sixth rate using the Dursley Galley as a model. This design works and sailed well. Seventeen ships would be rebuilds of earlier vessels, some would be fifth rates, a couple of fireships and three vessels of new construction with the majority rebuilt from older sixth rate vessels. These ships would be constructed between 1722 and 1727.

== Design and specifications ==
The construction of the vessels was assigned to Royal dockyards. As with most vessels of this time period only order and launch dates are available. The dimensional data listed here is the specification data and the acceptable design creep will be listed on each individual vessel. The gundeck was 106 feet 0 inches (32.3 metres) with a keel length of 87 feet 9 inches (26.7 metres) for tonnage calculation. The breadth would be 28 feet 4 inches (8.6 metres) with a depth of hold of 9 ft 2 in (2.8 m). The tonnage calculation would be 375 tons.

The gun armament as established in 1703 would be twenty 6-pounder 19 hundredweight (cwt) guns mounted on wooden trucks on the upper deck (UD).

== Ships of the 1719 Establishment Group ==
| Name | Rebuilder | Launch date | Remarks |
|---|---|---|---|
| Lyme | Deptford Dockyard | 8 November 1720 | Rebuilt from 5th rate 1720; Breaking completed January 1739 |
| Lowestoffe | Portsmouth Dockyard | 18 December 1723 | Rebuilt from 5th rate 1720; Sold at Sheerness 29 September 1744 |
| Scarborough renamed Garland | Deptford Dockyard | 18 October 1711 | Rebuilt from 5th rate 1720; Sold at Sheerness 29 September 1744 |
| Scarborough | Deptford Dockyard | 19 July 1722 | Rebuilt from 5th rate 1720; Sold at Deptford 5 June 1744 |
| Experiment | Plymouth Dockyard | 1 November 1727 | Rebuilt from 5th rate 1727; Breaking complete at Portsmouth in July 1738 |
| Shoreham | Woolwich Dockyard | 25 August 1720 | Rebuilt from 5th rate 1720; Sold at Deptford 5 June 1744 |
| Gibraltar | Deptford Dockyard | 8 August 1727 | Sold 16 March 1749 |
| Seahorse | Deptford Dockyard | 7 October 1727 | Sold 27 July 1748 |
| Seaford | Deptford Dockyard | 22 October 1724 | broken at Woolwich April to June 1740 |
| Rose | Woolwich Dockyard | 8 September 1724 | Sold at Deptford 5 June 1744 |
| Deal Castle | Sheerness Dockyard | 6 April 1727 | Sold at Deptford 14 August 1746 |
| Nightingale Renamed Fox | Deptford Dockyard | 18 November 1727 | Breaking completed at Deptford in January 1738 |
| Bideford | Chatham Dockyard | 2 October 1727 | Foundered off Flamborough Head 18 March 1736 |
| Flamborough | Portsmouth Dockyard | 21 October 1727 | Sold at Woolwich 10 January 1749 |
| Aldborough | Portsmouth Dockyard | 21 October 1727 | Broken at Deptford 31 March 1742 |
| Squirrel | Woolwich Dockyard | 19 October 1727 | Sold at Woolwich 17 October 1749 |
| Phoenix | Woolwich Dockyard | 16 January 1728 | Sold at Woolwich 28 June 1744 |
| Blandford | Deptford Dockyard | 13 February 1720 | New Construction; sold 28 October 1742 |
| Greyhound | Deptford Dockyard | 13 February 1720 | New Construction; Breaking completed June 1741 for rebuilding |
| Rye | Chatham Dockyard | 6 October 1727 | New Construction; Broken at Sheerness December 1735 |
