= Flamborough Group =

Class overview
- Name: Flamborough Group
- Builders: Woolwich Dockyard
- Operators: Royal Navy
- Preceded by: Nightingale Group
- Succeeded by: Gibraltar Group
- Built: 1706–1708
- In service: 1706–1727
- Completed: 2
- Lost: 0
- Retired: 2

General characteristics
- Type: 24-gun sixth rate
- Tons burthen: 261 49/94 bm
- Length: 94 ft 0 in (28.7 m) gundeck; 79 ft 8 in (24.3 m) keel for tonnage
- Beam: 25 ft 0 in (7.6 m) for tonnage
- Depth of hold: 10 ft 8 in (3.3 m)
- Sail plan: ship-rigged
- Armament: 20 × 6-pdr guns on wooden trucks (UD); 4 × 4-pdr guns on wooden trucks (QD)

The Flamborough sixth rates were basically repeats of the Maidstone Group and designed and built by Richard Stacey, Master Shipwright of Woolwich. Two vessels were ordered. Their armament was similar as were the dimensions of the vessels. They were constructed between 1706 and 1708.

== Design and specifications ==
The construction of the vessels was assigned Woolwich dockyard. As with most vessels of this time period only order and launch dates are available. The dimensional data listed here Flamborough, whereas Squirrel will be listed in her article. The gundeck was 94 feet 0 inches (28.7 metres) with a keel length of 79 feet 8 inches (24.3 metres) for tonnage calculation. The breadth would be 25 feet 0 inches (7.6 metres) for tonnage with a depth of hold of 10 feet 8 inches (3.3 metres). The tonnage calculation would be 261 49/94.

The gun armament as established in 1703 would be twenty 6-pounder cannon mounted on wooden trucks on the upper deck with four 4-pounder guns on the quarterdeck.

== Ships of the Flamborough Group ==
Name	Builder	Launch date	Remarks
Flamborough (1707)	Woolwich Dockyard	29 January 1707	Docked Portsmouth for rebuilding
Squirrel (1707)	Woolwich Dockyard	29 December 1707	Dismantled at Deptford then moved to Woolwich for rebuilding
