= James Gambier (Royal Navy officer) =

Royal Navy admiral

Vice-Admiral James Gambier
- Born: 1723
- Died: 28 January 1789 (aged 65–66); Bath, Somerset
- Military career
- Allegiance: Great Britain
- Branch: Royal Navy
- Active: c. 1740–1789
- Rank: Vice-Admiral
- Commands: HMS Speedwell; HMS Flamborough; HMS Squirrel; HMS Sphinx; HMS Namur; HMS Defiance; HMS Severn; HMS Lowestoffe; HMS Burford; HMS Yarmouth; Nore Command; North America Station; HMS Salisbury; Controller of Victualling Accounts; Resident Commissioner Portsmouth; Royal Naval Academy; North America Station; Jamaica Station
- Conflicts: War of the Austrian Succession; Seven Years' War; Siege of Louisbourg; Invasion of Martinique; Invasion of Guadeloupe; Battle of Quiberon Bay; Capture of Belle Île; American Revolutionary War

Vice-Admiral James Gambier (1723–1789) was a Royal Navy officer who served as Commander-in-Chief, North American Station. The historian David Syrett authored a study of Gambier, which presented him as corrupt and largely disliked by his fellow officers.

== Naval career ==
Gambier joined the Royal Navy in about 1740 being promoted to lieutenant in 1743. Promoted to captain, he commanded HMS Flamborough and HMS Squirrel. Later he commanded HMS Burford and took part in the capture of Louisbourg and the capture of Guadeloupe.

In 1770 he was appointed commander-in-chief, North American Station; this appointment had been predictable because of his connections with the Vice Admiral Sir Samuel Cornish. He was subsequently removed from control of the North American Station, following the rise of Lord Sandwich as First Lord of the Admiralty. In 1773 he was made commissioner of victualling accounts on the Navy Board in an attempt to make amends to him for his political removal from his command in North America. In September of that same year Gambier was appointed commissioner of Portsmouth. However, Gambier was not very successful or content with this position, as he was completely unprepared for managing a large civilian organization such as that at Portsmouth. After becoming rear-admiral of the red from seniority in 1778, he returned to North America and was briefly commander-in-chief of the North American Station again after resigning from the commissionership at Portsmouth. During his time in the post, Gambier was repeatedly accused of corruption and he was despised by many of his contemporaries.

In October 1783 he became commander-in-chief in the Jamaica Station. He was not well liked by his men and was once described as "this penurious old reptile". He retired in 1784.

Captain George Vancouver likely named Gambier Point, Alexander Archipelago, Alaska after Gambier in 1794.

== Family ==
Gambier's nephew also became an admiral and later 1st Baron Gambier. Gambier's son, also James Gambier (1772–1844), was British consul-general to the Portuguese royal court from 1803. He followed the court's transfer to Rio de Janeiro, Brazil, in 1808, and returned to England in 1814. James Gambier the younger's illegitimate son was Royal Navy officer James Fitzjames, making him James Gambier the elder's grandson.

== See also ==
- James Fitzjames
- James Gambier, 1st Baron Gambier
- Port Royal

== Sources ==
- Cundall, Frank (1915). Historic Jamaica. West India Committee.

Military offices
Preceded by Samuel Hood	Commander-in-Chief, North American Station; 1770–1771	Succeeded by John Montagu
Preceded by Richard Howe	Commander-in-Chief, North American Station; 1778–1779	Succeeded by John Byron
Preceded by Joshua Rowley	Commander-in-Chief, Jamaica Station; 1783–1784	Succeeded by John Pakenham
