= Modified 1719 Establishment Group =

Class of ships

Class overview
- Name: Modified 1719 Establishment Group
- Builders: Deptford Dockyard
- Operators: Royal Navy
- Preceded by: 1719 Establishment Group
- Succeeded by: 1733 Establishment Group
- Built: 1729–1732
- In service: 1732–1760
- Completed: 2
- Lost: 1
- Retired: 1

General characteristics
- Type: 20-gun sixth rate
- Tons burthen: 428 13/94 bm
- Length: 106 ft 0 in (32.3 m) gundeck; 87 ft 0 in (26.5 m) keel for tonnage
- Beam: 30 ft 5 in (9.3 m) for tonnage
- Depth of hold: 9 ft 2 in (2.8 m)
- Sail plan: ship-rigged
- Armament: 20 × 6-pdr 19 cwt guns on wooden trucks (UD)

The Modified 1719 Establishment Group of sixth rates were basically identical to the 1719 Establishment Group except they were two feet wider. One ship would be a rebuild of an earlier vessel and one vessel of new construction. These vessels like the 1719 Establishment Group would have no lower gun ports, however, would have ten oar ports per side on the lower deck. These ships would be constructed between 1729 and 1732.

== Design and specifications ==
The construction of the vessels was assigned to Deptford Dockyard under the guidance of Master Shipwright Richard Stacey. As with most vessels of this time period only order and launch dates are available. The dimensional data listed here is the specification data. The gundeck was 106 feet 0 inches (32.3 metres) with a keel length of 87 feet 0 inches (26.5 metres) for tonnage calculation. The breadth would be 30 feet 5 inches (9.3 metres) with a depth of hold of 9 ft 2 in (2.8 m). The tonnage calculation would be 428 tons.

The gun armament as established in 1703 would be twenty 6-pounder 19 hundredweight (cwt) guns mounted on wooden trucks on the upper deck (UD).

== Ships of the 1719 Establishment Group ==
Name	Rebuilder	Launch date	Remarks
Sheerness	Deptford Dockyard	4 January 1732	Rebuilt from 5th rate 1691; Sold 5 June 1744
Dolphin	Deptford Dockyard	6 January 1732	taken by French and burnt 23 March 1760
