= Maidstone Group =

Class overview
- Name: Maidstone Group
- Builders: Chatham Dockyard; Sheerness Dockyard; Deptford Dockyard; Portsmouth Dockyard; 9 vessels by contract
- Operators: Royal Navy
- Preceded by: None
- Succeeded by: Nightingale Group
- Built: 1693–1697
- In service: 1694–1719
- Completed: 18
- Lost: 11
- Retired: 7

General characteristics
- Type: 20-gun sixth rate
- Tons burthen: 244 57/94 bm
- Length: 93 ft 0 in (28.3 m) gundeck; 77 ft 8 in (23.7 m) keel for tonnage
- Beam: 24 ft 4 in (7.4 m) for tonnage
- Depth of hold: 10 ft 8 in (3.3 m)
- Armament: initially as ordered; 20 × sakers on wooden trucks (UD); 4 × 3-pdr on wooden trucks (QD); 1703 Establishment; 20 × 6-pdrs on wooden trucks (UD); 4 × 4-pdr on wooden trucks (QD)

Before 1688 no sixth rate carried more than 20 guns. At the start of the Anglo-French War in 1688 the British captured four 20 plus gunned French vessels, that were rated by the French as sixth rates. The British Admiralty submitted a requirement to the Navy Board for a 'standard' sixth rate of 20 guns on the upper deck with four smaller guns on the quarterdeck. The vessel proposed by the Navy Board had an estimated cost of £1,676.10.0d (Note: A total cost accounting for inflation of approximately £305,000 in today's money per ship.) per ship with another £2,513 (Note: A total cost accounting for inflation of approximately £457,300 in today's money per ship.) for materials for completion. Initially fourteen ships were ordered, Batch 1 of four vessels in July 1693, Batch 2 of eight vessels in spring 1694, Batch 3 of two vessels in March 1695 with a further four in 1696. This first standardized group of sixth rates became known as the Maidstone Group.

== Design and specifications ==
The initial order was for fourteen vessels spread over three building seasons with another four added in 1696. The construction of the vessels was evenly split between Dockyard-built vessels and contracted vessels. As with most vessels of this period only order and launch dates are available. Each ship was built to a generalized specification with dimensional creep accruing in all vessels. The dimensional data listed here is the general specification, whereas the actual dimensions where known will be listed with each ship. The general specification called for a gundeck of 93 feet 0 inches (28.3 metres) with a keel length of 77 feet 8 inches (23.7 metres) for tonnage calculation. The breadth would be 24 feet 4 inches (7.4 metres) for tonnage with a depth of hold of 10 feet 8 inches (3.3 metres). The tonnage calculation would be 244 57/94.

The initial gun armament would be twenty sakers mounted on wooden trucks located on the upper deck (UD) with a further four 3-pounders (Note: "3-pounder" refers to the weight of the ball fired) mounted on wooden trucks on the quarterdeck (QD). A saker or sacar was a muzzle-loading smoothbore gun of 1,400 pounds in weight with a 3 1/2-inch bore firing a 5 1/2-pound shot with a 5 1/2-pound powder charge. In 1703 the armament would be established at twenty 6-pounders mounted on wooden trucks on the upper deck with four 4-pounders on the quarterdeck.

== Ships of the Maidstone Group ==
| Name | Builder | Launch date | Remarks |
|---|---|---|---|
| Maidstone | Chatham Dockyard | 31 December 1693 | Sold 29 July 1714 |
| Jersey | Deptford Dockyard | 17 January 1694 | renamed Margate 21 October 1698; Wrecked 9 October 1707 |
| Lizard | Chatham Dockyard | 19 March 1694 | lost with all hands 31 May 1696 |
| Newport | Portsmouth Dockyard | 7 April 1694 | taken by French 5 July 1696 |
| Falcon | Nicholas Barret, Shoreham | 28 September 1694 | taken by French 10 June 1695, retaken in 1703 and broken |
| Queenborough | Sheerness Dockyard | 22 December 1694 | Sold 20 August 1719 |
| Swan | Robert & John Castle, Deptford | 13 September 1694 | Lost in tropical storm 17 August 1707 |
| Drake | George Fowler, Rotherhithe | 26 September 1694 | Lost with all hands 20 December 1694 |
| Solebay | Edward Snelgrove, Redhouse | 13 September 1694 | Wrecked 25 December 1709 |
| Seahorse | John Hayden, Limehouse | 27 September 1694 | Wrecked 14 March 1704 |
| Bideford | Nicholas Barret, Harwich | 25 October 1695 | Wrecked 12 November 1699 |
| Penzance | Thomas Ellis, Shoreham | 22 April 1695 | Sold 24 September 1713 |
| Dunwich | William Collins & Robert Chatfield, Shoreham | 15 October 1695 | Sunk as breakwater at Plymouth 15 October 1714 |
| Orford | Thomas Ellis, Shoreham | 29 November 1695 | renamed Newport 3 September 1698; Sold 29 July 1714 |
| Lizard (ii) | Sheerness Dockyard | 29 March 1697 | Sold 29 July 1714 |
| Flamborough | Chatham Dockyard | 10 July 1697 | Taken by French 10 October 1705 and scuttled |
| Seaford | Portsmouth Dockyard | 15 October 1697 | Broken in August 1722 |
| Deal Castle | Deptford Dockyard | 6 November 1697 | Taken by French 3 July 1706 |
