= British Warships in the Age of Sail =

Series of books first published by Rif Winfield

- Front cover of British Warships in the Age of Sail 1793–1817
- Author: Rif Winfield
- Language: English
- Subject: Sailing warships of the Royal Navy
- Genre: Maritime History
- Publisher: Chatham Publishing (orig.); Seaforth Publishing
- Publication date: 2005–2014

British Warships in the Age of Sail is a series of four books by maritime historian Rif Winfield comprising a historical reference work providing details of all recorded ships that served or were intended to serve in the (British) Royal Navy (and its predecessor services) from 1603 to 1863. Similar volumes dealing with other navies during the Age of Sail have followed from the same publisher.

== Scope ==
The books draw data from Admiralty official records to give details on the location of construction, dates of construction (ordering, keel laying, launch, commissioning and completion of fitting-out), principal dimensions and tonnage, complement of men and armament, machinery (for steam vessels) and fate of every ship of the Royal Navy over the period. Designed dimensions and tonnage are given for every class of vessel planned and built for the Navy, but in addition the actual dimensions measured for each individual vessel completed to those designs are separately given; this treatment has also been applied to the many vessels purchased or captured by British naval forces, and added to the service. The costs of building and fitting out each vessel are given (where known), as well as the costs and dates of major refits during each ship's life. Also included are details of their commanders with dates when each served, areas and periods of service, and significant actions in which the ships took part.

Each volume contains details of over two thousand separate vessels, and is illustrated by approximately two hundred black-and-white renditions of the design draughts, contemporary portrayals and other depictions of most classes of vessel covered.

== Series ==
The series comprises four volumes; the fourth volume in this series, covering the period 1817–1863, includes coverage of all steam-powered warships of this era (paddle-driven as well as screw-driven) as well as purely sailing vessels. The first of the series to be produced, the 1793–1817 volume, was first published in 2005 by Chatham Publishing. The remaining titles, and an updated edition of the 1793–1817 volume, have been published by Seaforth Publishing:

- British Warships in the Age of Sail 1603–1714: Design, Construction, Careers and Fates (2009) ISBN 978-1-84832-040-6.
- British Warships in the Age of Sail 1714–1792: Design, Construction, Careers and Fates (2007) ISBN 978-1-84415-700-6.
- British Warships in the Age of Sail 1793–1817: Design, Construction, Careers and Fates (2005. Second edition in 2008) ISBN 978-1-84415-717-4.
- British Warships in the Age of Sail 1817–1863: Design, Construction, Careers and Fates (2014) ISBN 978-1-84832-169-4.

Pending availability of the fourth volume in the series, sailing warships after 1817 were covered (in somewhat less detail) by The Sail and Steam Navy List, 1815–1889, by David Lyon and Rif Winfield.

New softback editions of the first three books in the series are scheduled to be published in October 2026.

== Similar volumes on other Navies ==
The series on British Warships have been followed by companion volumes covering other Naval forces on the sailing era.

- Russian Warships in the Age of Sail 1696–1860: Design, Construction, Careers and Fates (by John M. Tredrea and Eduard Sozaev) (2010) ISBN 978-1-84832-058-1.
- Dutch Warships in the Age of Sail 1600–1714: Design, Construction, Careers and Fates (by James Bender) (2014) ISBN 978-1-84832-157-1.
- Winfield, Rif; Roberts, Stephen S. (2017). French Warships in the Age of Sail 1626–1786: Design Construction, Careers and Fates. Seaforth. ISBN 978-1-4738-9351-1.
- Winfield, Rif; Roberts, Stephen S. (2015). French Warships in the Age of Sail 1786—1861: Design Construction, Careers and Fates. Seaforth. ISBN 978-1-84832-204-2.
- Winfield, Rif; Tredrea, John M.; García-Torralba Pérez, Enrique; Blasco Felip, Manuel (2023). Spanish Warships in the Age of Sail 1700—1860: Design Construction, Careers and Fates. Seaforth. ISBN 978-1-5267-9078-1.

The above-mentioned volumes dealing with Russian, French and Spanish warships—like the equivalent (fourth) volume in the British Warships series—also cover steam-powered (both paddle-driven and screw-driven) warships constructed for those navies in the same period. The Spanish Warships volume retrospectively also looked at the development of Spanish naval forces under the Habsburgs in the 16th and 17th centuries.

== Reception ==
Reviewing the 1793–1817 work, the Journal for Maritime Research wrote that 'It is well researched, well presented, easy to navigate and exhaustive in its coverage. It is a reference work that will be used by students and scholars of the sailing Navy for years to come.'

When reviewing the 1714–1792 volume, the second work to be published, the South West Maritime History Society described it as 'frankly quite superb', and 'the most complete analysis of the ships of the Royal Navy ever prepared.'

The third volume to be produced, covering 1603–1714, was likewise described by the South West Maritime History Society as 'In a single word "SUPERLATIVE"' and 'This book is frankly quite superb and deserves to be included in the library of anyone interested in this period of maritime history.'

Noted maritime historian Andrew Lambert commented..."there is no equivalent work dealing with the Royal or any other major Navy ...of the sailing age... the wealth of detail can be deployed in many ways. The development of ship types, officer careers, ship longevity, the role of foreign prizes in developing British design, the strategy and tactics of cruiser warfare and much more besides."

== See also ==
- List of early warships of the English navy
- List of ships of the line of the Royal Navy
- List of frigate classes of the Royal Navy
- List of corvette and sloop classes of the Royal Navy
- List of gun-brigs of the Royal Navy
- List of bomb vessels of the Royal Navy
- Ships of the Royal Navy – directory of all Royal Navy ships by J. J. Colledge
- Bibliography of 18th–19th-century Royal Naval history
