= HMS Dunkirk's Prize (1705) =

British warship

History

France
- Name: Le Hocquart
- Commissioned: 1705
- Captured: By Royal Navy, September 1705

History

England
- Name: HMS Dunkirk's Prize
- Acquired: 15 November 1705
- Commissioned: 1706
- Fate: Grounded and lost 18 October 1708

General characteristics
- Type: 26-gun Sixth Rate
- Tons burthen: 291 14/94 bm
- Length: 70 ft 8 in (21.5 m) keel for tonnage
- Beam: 27 ft 10 in (8.5 m) for tonnage
- Depth of hold: 12 ft 6 in (3.8 m)
- Armament: 20 × 6-pdr guns on wooden trucks (UD); 6 × 3-pdr guns on wooden trucks (QD)

HMS Dunkirk's Prize was a 26-gun French privateer, Le Hocquart of St Malo taken by HMS Dunkirk in September 1705. She was purchased and registered on 15 November 1705. She was commissioned into the Royal Navy in 1706 for service in the West Indies. She was grounded and lost while chasing a French privateer which also went aground and was captured. She was lost in 1708.

Dunkirk's Prize was the third named ship since it was used for a 2-gun ketch captured from the French in 1656 and sold in 1660.

== Specifications ==
She was captured in September 1705 and purchased on 15 November 1705. Her keel for tonnage calculation of 70 feet 8 inches (21.5 metres). Her breadth for tonnage was 27 feet 10 inches (8.5 metres) with the depth of hold of 12 ft 6 in (3.8 m). Her tonnage calculation was 291 14/94 tons. Her armament was twenty-six 6-pounders on the upper deck with and six 3-pounders on the quarterdeck all on wooden trucks.

== Commissioned service ==
She was commissioned in 1706 under the command of Commander Edward Holland, RN for service in the West Indies. In 1708 Commander George Purvis, RN took command.

== Disposition ==
She ran aground while pursuing a French privateer off Cap Francois, Haiti. The privateer also ran aground and was captured by the British. Dunkirk's Prize was lost on 18 October 1708.
