= HMS Saudadoes (1669) =

British warship

History

England
- Name: HMS Saudadoes
- Builder: Royal Dockyard, Portsmouth
- Launched: 28 October 1669
- Commissioned: 6 November 1669
- Honours and awards: Bantry Bay 1689; Barfleur 1692
- Fate: Captured by French and burnt 23 February 1696

General characteristics As Built 1669
- Class & type: 8/6=gun, Sixth Rate
- Tons burthen: 83 84/94 bm
- Length: 51 ft 6 in (15.70 m) keel for tonnage
- Beam: 17 ft 6 in (5.33 m) for tonnage
- Draught: 8 ft 0 in (2.44 m)
- Depth of hold: 8 ft 0 in (2.44 m)
- Armament: 8 × 6-pounder MLSB guns

General characteristics As Rebuilt 1673
- Class & type: 16/14=gun, Sixth Rate
- Tons burthen: 181 89/94 bm
- Length: 74 ft 0 in (22.56 m) keel for tonnage
- Beam: 21 ft 6 in (6.55 m) for tonnage
- Draught: 9 ft 6 in (2.90 m)
- Depth of hold: 10 ft 0 in (3.05 m)
- Armament: 16/14 × 6-pdrs on trucks; from 1685; 4 × demiculverin cutts; 6 × 6-pdrs on trucks; 4 × sakers on trucks; 2 × 3-pdrs

HMS Saudadoes was built by Anthony Deane after his transfer to Portsmouth Dockyard (Harwich Dockyard was closed at the end of 1667) as the Master Shipwright. She was a smaller version of the Greyhound design. Initially she was a 8/6-gun sixth rate vessel. She was rebuilt in 1673 as a standard 16-gun vessel. She was commissioned in November 1669 then taken in hand at Deptford for her rebuild. She spent the majority of her career in Home Waters, participating in the Battle of Bantry Bay (as a fireship) and the Battle of Barfleur. She went to the Mediterranean for a year in 1694. Her final service was in the Channel where she was captured by two French privateers and burnt in February 1696.

Saudadoes was the first named vessel in the Royal Navy.

== Design and specifications ==
Her construction dates little is known other than her launch date. The ship was launched at Portsmouth Dockyard on 28 November 1669. Her keel length reported for tonnage was 51 feet 6 inches (15.70 metres). Her breadth was 17 feet 6 inches (5.33 metres) as reported for tonnage with her depth of hold of 8 feet 0 inches (2.44 metres). Her draught was only 8 feet 0 inches (2.44 metres). Her tonnage was calculated as 83 84/94 tons.

Her initial armament was listed as eight to six 6-pounder muzzle-loading smoothbore guns mounted on wooden trucks.

== Commissioned service ==
Her initial commission was under Captain Nicholas Hill, RN, on 6 November 1669 until 4 January 1670. She again came under his command on 9 May 1670 until his death on 9 June 1671. On 11 July 1671 Captain James Jenifer, RN, took command. He remained in command through her rebuild in 1673.

=== 1673 Rebuild at Deptford Dockyard ===
Of her rebuild dates little is known other than it occurred in 1673 and was at Deptford. After the rebuild her keel length reported for tonnage was 74 feet 0 inches (22.56 metres). Her breadth was 21 feet 6 inches (6.55 metres) as reported for tonnage with her depth of hold of 10 feet 0 inches (3.05 metres). Her draught was only 9 feet 6 inches (2.90 metres). Her tonnage was calculated as 181 89/94 tons. Her gun armament after the rebuild was now eighteen to sixteen 6-pounder muzzle-loading smoothbore guns on wooden trucks. By 1685 her armament was changed to four demi-culverin cutts, six 6-pounders, four sakers and two 3-pounders, all on wooden trucks.

=== Continued Service ===
Continuing under Captain Jenifer, upon completion of her rebuild she proceeded to Lisbon with Narbrough's squadron in 1673. In 1676 she was on 'Queen's service', Captain Jenifer died on 9 July 1677. Captain Richard Trevanion, RN, took over command on 21 July 1677 until 15 May 1678. Captain Trevanion reassumed command on 16 October 1678 for service off Scotland in 1679. She was in the Channel in 1680. She participated in the capture of Monmouth's ships on 20 June 1685. Captain John Beverley, RN, took command on 10 April 1687 until 1688 then Captain John Gradon, RN, took on 29 May 1678 until 1689.

In April 1689 she came under the command of Captain Francis Wyvill, RN. The ship was configured as a fireship and participated in the Battle of Bantry Bay on the south coast of Ireland on 1 May 1689. She was reconfigured as a sixth rate and came under the command of Captain Rodger Newton, RN, on 15 May 1690 for service in the Channel. Captain William Prowther took over in July 1691. She participated in the Battle of Barfleur from 19 to 24 May 1692. In 1693 Captain William Jumper, RN, was in command. On 12 July 1693 Captain Edmund Loades, RN, took command. Captain George Trenchard, RN, took command on 14 February 1694 for service in the Mediterranean. On her return to Home Waters Captain Thomas Day, RN, took command on 5 August 1695.

== Disposition ==
Saudadoes was taken and burnt by two large French privateers off the North Coast of France on 23 February 1696.
