= HMS Child's Play (1706) =

British warship

History

France
- Name: Le Jeux
- Launched: November 1689
- Commissioned: January 1690
- Captured: By Royal Navy, 7 June 1706

History

England
- Name: HMS Child's Play
- Acquired: 6 July 1706
- Commissioned: 10 July 1706
- Fate: Wrecked in hurricane 30 August 1707

General characteristics
- Type: 24-gun Sixth Rate
- Tons burthen: 373 2/94 bm
- Length: 103 ft 0 in (31.4 m) gundeck; 80 ft 7 in (24.6 m) keel for tonnage
- Beam: 29 ft 6 in (9.0 m) for tonnage
- Depth of hold: 10 ft 7 in (3.2 m)
- Armament: 20 × 6-pdr guns on wooden trucks (UD); 4 × 3-pdr guns on wooden trucks (QD)

HMS Child's Play was a 24-gun French privateer, Le Jeux of St Malo taken by HMS Tartar on 7 June 1706. She was purchased on 6 July 1706. She was commissioned into the Royal Navy on 10 July 1706 for service in the West Indies. She was wrecked in a hurricane in 1707.

Child's Play was the only named vessel in the Royal Navy.

== Specifications ==
She was captured on 7 June 1706 and purchased on 6 July 1706. Her gundeck was 103 feet 0 inches (31.4 metres) with her keel for tonnage calculation of 80 feet 7 inches (24.6 metres). Her breadth for tonnage was 29 feet 6 inches (9.0 metres) with the depth of hold of 10 ft 7 in (3.2 m). Her tonnage calculation was 373 2/94 tons. Her armament was twenty-six 6-pounders on the upper deck and four 3-pounders on the quarterdeck all on wooden trucks.

== Commissioned service ==
She was commissioned on 10 July 1706 under the command of Captain George Doyley, RN for service in the West Indies. Captain Doyley drowned when the ship was lost.

== Loss ==
She was wrecked in a hurricane on Palmetto Point, St Kitts on 30 August 1707.
