= HMS Orford's Prize (1708) =

History

France
- Name: La Gaillarde
- Launched: June 1689
- Commissioned: 1690
- Captured: By Royal Navy, 2 October 1708

History

England
- Name: HMS Orford's Prize
- Acquired: 21 October 1708
- Commissioned: 1708
- Captured: 27 May 1709
- Fate: Retaken by two French privateers off Lundy

General characteristics
- Type: 24-gun Sixth Rate
- Tons burthen: 283 34/94 bm
- Length: 74 ft 11 in (22.8 m) keel for tonnage
- Beam: 26 ft 9 in (8.2 m) for tonnage
- Depth of hold: 11 ft 6 in (3.5 m)
- Armament: 20 × 6-pdr guns on wooden trucks (UD); 6 × 4-pdr guns on wooden trucks (QD)

HMS Orford's Prize was a 24-gun French privateer, Le Gaillarde taken by HMS Orford on 2 October 1708. She was purchased and registered on 21 October 1708. She was commissioned into the Royal Navy in 1708 then retaken by the French in 1709.

Orford's Prize was the fourth ship so named since it was used for a 24-gun sixth rate launched by Ellis of Shoreham on 29 November 1695, renamed Newport on 3 September 1698, and sold in 1714.

== Specifications ==
She was captured 2 October 1708 and purchased on 21 October 1708. Her keel for tonnage calculation of 74 feet 11 inches (22.8 metres). Her breadth for tonnage was 26 feet 9 inches (8.2 metres) with the depth of hold of 11 ft 6 in (3.5 m). Her tonnage calculation was 283 34/94 tons. Her armament was twenty-six 6-pounders on the upper deck with and four 3-pounders on the quarterdeck, all on wooden trucks.

== Commissioned service ==
She was commissioned in 1708 under the command of Commander William Collier, RN.

== Disposition ==
She was retaken by two 30-gun French privateers off Lundy on 27 May 1709. She resumed her French name La Gaillarde.
