= HMS Triton's Prize (1705) =

French privateer

History

France
- Name: Le Royal
- Captured: By Royal Navy, 3 February 1705

History

England
- Name: HMS Triton's Prize
- Acquired: 3 March 1705
- Commissioned: 1705
- Fate: Sold 26 November 1713

General characteristics
- Type: 30-gun Sixth Rate
- Tons burthen: 274 84/94 bm
- Length: 75 ft 0 in (22.9 m) keel for tonnage
- Beam: 26 ft 3 in (8.0 m) for tonnage
- Depth of hold: 12 ft 6 in (3.8 m)
- Armament: 24 × 6-pdr sakers on wooden trucks (UD); 4 × 3-pdr guns on wooden trucks (QD)

HMS Triton's Prize was a 30-gun French privateer, Le Royal of St Malo taken by HMS Triton on 3 February 1705. She was purchased on 3 March 1705. She was commissioned into the Royal Navy in 1705 for service in the English Channel. She went to the American colonies of New York and Virginia, remaining there until sold in 1703.

Triton's Prize (actually spelt Tryton's Prize, Tryton or Triton) was the second named ship since it was used for a 42-gun fifth rate captured from the French in October 1702 and sold at Woolwich on 4 October 1709.

== Specifications ==
She was captured on 3 February and purchased on 3 March 1705. Her keel for tonnage calculation of 75 feet 0 inches (22.9 metres). Her breadth for tonnage was 26 feet 3 inches (8.0 metres) with the depth of hold of 12 ft 6 in (3.8 m). Her tonnage calculation was 274 84/94 tons. Her armament was twenty-six 6-pounders on the upper deck with and four 3-pounders on the quarterdeck all on wooden trucks.

== Commissioned service ==
She was commissioned in 1705 under the command of Commander Thomas Miles, RN for service in the English Channel. She was assigned to the American colonies in 1706 sailing for New York. In 1707 Commander Coningsby Norbury, RN took command followed by Commander Richard Girlington, RN in 1709 sailing to Virginia in 1710 and 1711. On 27 February 1713 Captain Pace, RN took over command followed by Captain Francis Hume, RN on 24 July 1713.

== Disposition ==
She was sold on 26 November 1713.
