= HMS Sun Prize (1704) =

Royal Navy ship

History

France
- Name: Le Soliel
- Captured: By Royal Navy, 13 May 1704

History

England
- Name: HMS Sun Prize
- Acquired: 1 July 1704
- Commissioned: 1704
- Captured: 17 January 1708
- Fate: Taken by French 36-gun privateer off St Albans Head, Dorset

General characteristics
- Type: 22-gun Sixth Rate
- Tons burthen: 215 12/94 bm
- Length: 82 ft 8 in (25.2 m) gundeck; 69 ft 3 in (21.1 m) keel for tonnage
- Beam: 24 ft 2 in (7.4 m) for tonnage
- Depth of hold: 9 ft 7.5 in (2.9 m)
- Armament: 18 × 6-pdr sakers on wooden trucks (UD); 4 × 4-pdr minions on wooden trucks (QD)

HMS Sun Prize was a 22-gun sixth rate taken by HMS Litchfield on 13 May 1704. She was registered as a Royal Navy Vessel on 1 July 1704. She was commissioned into the Royal Navy in 1704 for service in the English Channel. She was recaptured by a French 36-gun privateer off St Albans Head in 1708.

Sun Prize (actually spelt Sunn Prize or Sunn) was the third named ship since it was used for a 12-gun vessel with Sir Humphrey Gilbert in 1682 and lost in 1683.

== Specifications ==
She was captured on 13 May 1704 and registered on 1 July 1704. Her gundeck was 82 feet 8 inches (25.2 metres) with her keel for tonnage calculation of 69 feet 3 inches (21.1 metres). Her breadth for tonnage was 24 feet 2 inches (7.4 metres) with the depth of hold of 9 ft 7.5 in (2.9 m). Her tonnage calculation was 215 12/94 tons. Her armament was eighteen sakers and four minions all on wooden trucks.

== Commissioned service ==
She was commissioned in 1704 under the command of Captain John Bennet, RN for service in the English Channel. In 1706 Commander J. Grayham, RN took command followed by Commander John Wood, RN on 20 January 1707. In 1708 Commander Andrew Ley, RN took over command.

== Disposition ==
She was taken by the French 36-gun privateer Le Duc de Vendome off St Albans Head, Dorset on 17 January 1708. She suffered 2 dead, 1 missing and twelve wounded during the engagement.
