= HMS Fanfan (1666) =

History

England
- Name: HMS Fanfan
- Builder: Royal Dockyard, Harwich
- Launched: July 1666
- Commissioned: 10 July 1666
- Honours and awards: Oxfordness 1666; Solebay 1672
- Fate: Converted to a pitch vessel 1692 or 1693

General characteristics
- Class & type: 4=gun, Ketch
- Tons burthen: 33 66/94 bm
- Length: 58 ft 6 in (17.83 m) gundeck; 44 ft 0 in (13.41 m) keel for tonnage
- Beam: 12 ft 0 in (3.66 m) for tonnage
- Draught: 5 ft 6 in (1.68 m)
- Depth of hold: 5 ft 8 in (1.73 m)
- Armament: as built; 4 × sakers

HMS Fanfan was built by Anthony Deane during his tenure as the Master Shipwright at Harwich Dockyard under the 1665 Programme.. While the vessel was commissioned as a sixth rate, she was actually a yacht built for Prince Rupert and allegedly named after the pet-name of one of his lady friends. The vessel was more along the lines of a ketch (rated as a yacht) than a sixth rate vessel. It saw action during the Battle of Oxfordness 1666. Then the Mediterranean before being sent to Ireland and Scotland. She was converted to a pitch boat in either 1692 or 1693.

Fanfan was the only named ship in the Royal Navy.

== Design and specifications ==
Her construction dates little is known other than Her launch date. She was launched at Harwich Dockyard in July 1666. Her gundeck was 58 feet 6 inches (17.83 metres) and her keel length reported for tonnage was 44 feet 0 inches (13.41 metres). Her breadth was 12 feet 0 inches (3.66 metres) as reported for tonnage with her depth of hold of 5 feet 8 inches (1.73 metres). Her draught was only 5 feet 6 inches (1.68 metres). Her tonnage was listed as 3366/94 tons.

Her armament consisted initially of 4 sakers. A saker or sacar was a muzzle-loading smoothbore gun of 1,400 pounds in weight with a 3 1/2-inch bore firing a 5 1/2-pound shot with a 5 1/2-pound powder charge. The guns were mounted on wooden trucks. In 1685 these guns were changed for four minion cannons. A minion cannon was a muzzle-loading smoothbore 1,000-pound gun with a 3 1/2-inch bore firing a 4-inch shot with a 4-pound powder charge. The guns were also mounted on wooden trucks.

== Commissioned service ==
She was commissioned on 10 July 1666 under the command of Captain William Garris, RN. In action on 25 July as a member of the Red Squadron under Albemarle and Prince Rupert, she was involved in the chase of de Ruyter's Fleet following the St James's Day Fight, also known as the Battle of Oxfordness. On 8 August 1666 she became the Flagship of Sir Robert Holmes for his operation at Terschelling Roads. Between the 9th and 10 August, his attack on the River Vlie on the Dutch coast would become known as Sir Robert Holmes' Bonfire. Captain Garris died on 7 July 1667. Captain Thomas Fuller, RN took command the next day, the 8th. With the death of Captain Fuller on 21 February, Captain Robert Long, RN took command on 10 May 1668. Captain Long died 6 July 1668. On 30 October 1669 Captain John Kelsey, RN took command until 4 January 1671.

On 9 February 1672, Captain John Pybus, RN took command. She was at the Battle of Solebay as a member of the Red Squadron on 25 May 1672. Captain Pybus remained in command until his death on 20 March 1674. From 30 July 1677 until 19 July 1679 she was under the command of Captain William Stone, RN. She went to the Mediterranean in 1678. Captain Andrew Cotton, RN was her commander from 1 July 1680 until 31 December 1681 and was based at Guernsey. In 1689 Captain Edward Pottinger, RN was in command until March 1690. In 1890 Captain Richard Finch commanded her until 1691 in Scotland and Ireland.

== Disposal ==
Fanfan was converted to a dockyard pitch boat in 1692 or 1693.
