= HMS Medway's Prize (1704) =

18th century ship in the Royal Navy

History

France
- Name: Les Trois Provinces
- Captured: By Royal Navy, 13 May 1704

History

England
- Name: HMS Medway's Prize
- Acquired: 6 September 1704
- Commissioned: 1705
- Fate: Sold late 1713

General characteristics
- Type: 28-gun Sixth Rate
- Tons burthen: 241 2/94 bm
- Length: 92 ft 8 in (28.2 m) gundeck; 72 ft 6 in (22.1 m) keel for tonnage
- Beam: 25 ft 0 in (7.6 m) for tonnage
- Depth of hold: 10 ft 6 in (3.2 m)
- Armament: 28 × 6-pdr guns on wooden trucks (UD)

HMS Medway's Prize was a 28-gun sixth rate taken by HMS Medway on 17 August 1704. She was registered as a Royal Navy Vessel on 6 September 1704. She was commissioned into the Royal Navy in 1705 for service in Home Waters then Jamaica. She was sold in late 1713.

Medway's Prize (Either Medway's Prize or Medway) was the fourteenth named ship since it was used for a 60-gun fourth rate, launched at Sheerness Dockyard on 20 September 1693, rebuilt in 1718, hulk in 1740, beached as a sheer hulk on 18 November 1748 at Portsmouth and broken at Portsmouth in October 1749.

== Specifications ==
She was captured on 17 August 1704 and registered on 6 September 1704. Her gundeck was 92 feet 8 inches (28.2 metres) with her keel for tonnage calculation of 72 feet 6 inches (22.1 metres). Her breadth for tonnage was 25 feet 0 inches (7.6 metres) with the depth of hold of 10 ft 6 in (3.2 m). Her tonnage calculation was 241 2/94 tons. Her armament was twenty-eight 6-pounders on wooden trucks.

== Commissioned service ==
She was commissioned in 1705 under the command of Commander Thomas Hughes, RN for service in the Mediterranean. In 1709 Commander Thomas Beverley, RN took command for service in Home Waters. On or about 10 June 1709 Captain Charles Brown, RN took command followed by Commander John Fletcher, RN in 1710 for service with the Fleet. In 1711 Captain William Basille, RN took over command for service at Jamaica.

== Disposition ==
She was sold in late 1713 at Jamaica.
