= HMS Truelove (1647) =

British warship

History

England
- Name: Katherine (1647)
- Acquired: 1647
- Commissioned: 1648
- Renamed: HMS Truelove (1648)
- Honours and awards: Texel 1673
- Fate: Expended as fire ship, 11 August 1673

General characteristics
- Class & type: 16/14-gun, Sixth Rate
- Tons burthen: 101 64/94 bm
- Length: 59 ft 0 in (17.98 m) keel for tonnage
- Beam: 18 ft 0 in (5.49 m) for tonnage
- Depth of hold: 7 ft 1 in (2.16 m)
- Armament: 14 guns in 1647 reducing to 12 guns in 1653

HMS Truelove was a Sixth-rate warship that started her career as the Royalist 14-gun Katherine during the English Civil War. She was captured by the Irish Squadron of the Parliamentary Forces in early 1647, then purchased for 75.1.02d and fitted for service at Bristol. She was commissioned in 1648, joined the Royalists then surrendered in November 1648 to Parliament. In the Commonwealth Navy she spent her time patrolling, as a guardship, moving troops. After the restoration of the monarchy, she was converted to a fire ship and expended at the Battle of Texel in 1673.

Truelove was the first named ship in the Royal Navy.

== Design and specifications ==
Not much information on the construction of this vessel has survived. Her keel length for tonnage was 59 feet 0 inches (17.98 metres) with her breadth reported for tonnage of 18 feet 0 inches (5.49 metres) and her depth of hold of 7 feet 1 inch (2.16 metres). Her builder's measure tonnage calculation was 101 64/94 tons. Her armament initially was fourteen guns, but the type is not known. By 1653 the number of guns had dropped to twelve.

== Commissioned service ==
=== Service in the Commonwealth Navy ===
In 1650 she was under the command of Captain Vessey on the Irish Coast and patrolling the Irish Sea. In 1651 Captain Robert Vessey took command. Later in 1653 Captain John Parker was her commander until 1656. Her next commander was Captain Benjamin Gunston followed by Captain John Smith in 1657. Captain Benjamin Firmase commanded for 1659.

=== Restoration of the Monarchy ===
After King Charles II landed in Dover, she was assigned as the Medway guardship in June 1660. She was later commanded by Captain Robert Holmes. On 1 July 1661 she was under the command of Captain Phineas Pett, RN until 25 September 1663. On 15 March she was under the command of Captain William Peach, RN and stationed at the Downs during the Battle of Lowestoft on 3 June 1665. In March 1666 she was stationed between Yarmouth and Harwich, then used as a transport to convey newly raised levies of soldiers to Harwich in July 1666. She was rebuilt at Harwich Dockyard under the oversight of Anthony Deane, Master shipwright of Harwich from October 1666 to March 1667. She commissioned on 19 November 1667 under Captain Thomas Langley. In 1668 she was converted to a fireship at Harwich.

=== Service as a Fireship ===
She was under command of Captain John Shelley, RN from 25 April 1668 to 11 January 1669, then Captain John Dawson, RN from 12 May 1671 to 5 January 1672. Finally she was under the command of Captain Peter Bonamy, RN until the Battle of Texel in 1673 where he was killed.

== Disposition ==
Truelove was expended as a fireship at the Battle of Texel on 11 August 1673.
