= HMS Sheerness (1691) =

History

England
- Name: HMS Sheerness
- Ordered: 28 June 1689
- Builder: Royal Dockyard, Sheerness
- Launched: 6 March 1691
- Commissioned: 1691
- Reclassified: sixth rate in 1717
- Captured: 28 March 1760
- Fate: Taken by the French and burnt

General characteristics
- Type: 32-gun fifth rate
- Tons burthen: 3591/94 bm
- Length: 105 ft 9 in (32.2 m) gundeck; 89 ft 3 in (27.2 m) keel for tonnage
- Beam: 27 ft 6 in (8.4 m) for tonnage
- Depth of hold: 10 ft 0 in (3.0 m)
- Sail plan: ship-rigged
- Complement: as fifth rate 145/100; as sixth rate 115/85
- Armament: as built; 4 × 4 demi-culverines on wooden trucks (LD); 20 × sakers on wooden trucks (UD); 4 × 4 minions on wooden trucks (QD); 1703 Establishment; 4 × 4 9-pdr guns on wooden trucks (LD); 22/20 × 6-pdr guns on wooden trucks (UD); 6/4 × 4-pdr guns on wooden trucks (QD); as sixth rate; 20/18 × 6-pdrs on wooden trucks (UD)

General characteristics as rebuilt 1731
- Type: 20-gun Sixth Rate
- Tons burthen: 428 13/94 bm
- Length: 106 ft 0 in (32.3 m) gundeck; 87 ft 0 in (26.5 m) keel for tonnage
- Beam: 30 ft 5 in (9.3 m) for tonnage
- Depth of hold: 9 ft 2 in (2.8 m)
- Sail plan: ship-rigged
- Armament: 20 × 6-pdr 19 cwt guns on wooden trucks (UD)

HMS Sheerness was a fifth rate built under the 1689 programme built at Sheerness Dockyard. Her guns were listed under old terms for guns as demi-culverines, (Note: A demi-culverine was a gun of 3,400 pounds with a four-inch bore firing a 9.5-pound shot with an eight-pound powder charge.) sakers (Note: A sacar or saker was a gun of 1,400 pounds with a 3.5-inch bore firing a 5.5-pound shot with a 5.5-pound powder charge.) and minions. (Note: A minion was a gun of 1,000 pounds with a 3.5-inch bore firing a 4-pound shot with a 4-pound powder charge.) After commissioning she spent her career in Home Waters, North America, the Mediterranean and the West Indies. She was reduced to a 20-gun sixth rate in 1717 then rebuilt as a Modified 1719 Establishment sixth rate in 1731. She was sold in 1744.

Sheerness was the second named vessel since it was used for a2-gun smack built at Chatham in 1673 and sunk 24 April 1695 as a foundation at Sheerness.

== Construction ==
She was ordered on 28 June 1689 from Chatham Dockyard to be built under the guidance of Master Shipwright Daniel Furzer. She was launched on 6 March 1691.

== Commissioned service ==
HMS Sheerness was commissioned in 1691 under the command of Captain Anthony Roope, RN for service in the North Sea. With the death of Captain Roope on 25 June 1692 Captain Thomas Fowlis took over. January 1693 saw Captain John Norris, RN, in command of the Smyrna convoy in June 1693. In September 1693, she was under Captain Lord Archibald Hamilton, RN. In 1694, she was temporarily under the command of Captain James Lawrence. Captain Valentine Bowles, RN was in command for service in the West Indies in 1697. Captain Bowles was dismissed by court-martial on 27 October 1698. Captain William Urry, RN was in command in 1701. she was off Dunkirk in 1702 then went to the Orkney Islands with Beaumont's squadron then was with Shovel's Fleet in October. In 1703 Captain Thomas Mitchell, RN was in command for service in Newfoundland in 1703. She then proceeded to the Leeward Islands in 1704 followed by the North Sea in 1705.

In 1706 she was under the command of Captain William Bloys, RN for service in the Leeward Islands. She took the privateer, La Trompeuse on 27 June 1709. She spent 1709–10 in the North Sea with service at the Firth of Forth in 1712. She underwent a great repair at Sheerness between November 1712 and February 1713 at a cost of £928.11.0 1/2d. (Note: A total cost accounting for inflation of approximately £165,700 in today's money.) She spent 1713 'owling'. She paid off at Portsmouth in December 1714. She was reduced to a 20-gun sixth rate by Admiralty Order (AO) on 23 February 1717 at a cost of £4,387.9.51/4d (Note: A total cost accounting for inflation of approximately £795,500 in today's money.) from February to August 1717.

== Commissioned Service as a Sixth Rate ==
She recommissioned under Captain Arthur Delgarno, RN for service at Sale, Morocco in 1718. She underwent a great repair at Deptford for £1,082.4.9d (Note: A total cost accounting for inflation of approximately £207,100 in today's money.) between April and October 1722. This repaired her head that was damaged by a collier at Woolwich. In April 1724 her commander was Captain James Cornwall, RN for service in New England. She was surveyed in 1729 then docked at Deptford on 7 March 1730 for dismantling and preparation for rebuilding.

== Rebuild to Modified 1719 Establishment Sixth Rate 1731 ==
She was ordered to be rebuilt on 116 December 1729 at Deptford Dockyard under the guidance of Master Shipwright Richard Stacey. Her keel was laid in December 1730 and launched on 4 January 1732. The dimensions after rebuild were gundeck 106 feet 0 inches (32.3 metres) with a keel length of 87 feet 0 inches (26.5 metres) for tonnage calculation. The breadth would be 30 feet 5 inches (9.3 metres) with a depth of hold of 9 ft 2 in (2.8 m). The tonnage calculation would be 42813/94 tons. The gun armament as established in 1713 would be twenty 6-pounder 19 hundredweight (cwt) guns mounted on wooden trucks. She was completed for sea on 11 February 1732 at a cost of £6,026 (Note: A total cost accounting for inflation of approximately £1,287,900 in today's money.)

== Commissioned Service After 1731 Rebuild ==
She was commissioned in January 1732 under the command of Captain Robert Fytche, RN for service at Newfoundland and moved to the Mediterranean in 1733. In 1734 she was under the command of Captain Miles Stapleton, RN for service in the West Indies. She took the Nuestra Senora del Rosario off Cartegena in December 1739. In May 1741 under Captain Robert Maynard, RN she partook in Santiago operations from July to October 1741. In 1742 under Captain Henry Ward, RN returned Home in September 1742.

== Disposition ==
She was sold by AO 23 May 1744 for £240 (Note: A total cost accounting for inflation of approximately £51,300 in today's money.) on 5 June 1744.
