= HMS Gibraltar (1711) =

History

Great Britain
- Name: HMS Gibraltar
- Ordered: 24 January 1711
- Builder: Royal Dockyard, Deptford
- Launched: 18 October 1711
- Commissioned: 1712
- Fate: Sold 16 March 1749

General characteristics
- Type: 24-gun Sixth Rate
- Tons burthen: 280 23/94 bm
- Length: 94 ft 1 in (28.7 m) gundeck; 76 ft 7 in (23.3 m) keel for tonnage
- Beam: 26 ft 2.75 in (8.0 m) for tonnage
- Depth of hold: 11 ft 6 in (3.5 m)
- Sail plan: ship-rigged
- Armament: 20 × 6-pdr 19 cwt guns on wooden trucks (UD); 4 × 4-pdr 12 cwt guns on wooden trucks (QD)

General characteristics as rebuilt 1727
- Type: 20-gun Sixth Rate
- Tons burthen: 374 66/94 bm
- Length: 106 ft 10 in (32.6 m) gundeck; 87 ft 9 in (26.7 m) keel for tonnage
- Beam: 28 ft 4 in (8.6 m) for tonnage
- Depth of hold: 9 ft 2 in (2.8 m)
- Sail plan: ship-rigged
- Armament: 20 × 6-pdr 19 cwt guns on wooden trucks (UD)

HMS Gibraltar was the name ship of the Gibraltar Group of 24-gun sixth rates. After commissioning she spent her career in Home waters and North America on trade protection duties. She was rebuilt at Deptford between 1725 and 1727. After her rebuild, she served in Home Waters, North America, the West Indies, and the Mediterranean on trade protection. She was sold in 1749.

Gibraltar was the first vessel in the Royal Navy to be given this name, which commemorated the capture by the Royal Navy of the Rock of Gibraltar in 1704.

== Construction ==
She was ordered on 24 January 1711 from Deptford Dockyard to be built under the guidance of Joseph Allin, Master Shipwright of Portsmouth. She was launched on 18 October 1711.

== Commissioned service ==
She was commissioned in 1712 under the command of Commander John Shorter, RN (promoted to captain in January 1713) for service in Ireland for 'owling'. She then came under the command of Captain Edward Falkingham, RN, for the Newfoundland convoy, and subsequently Captain Beaumont Waldron, RN, for service in the Channel. She was refitted at Deptford from March to July 1720 at a cost of £1,993.19.8d. (Note: A total cost accounting for inflation of approximately £356,100 in today's money.) She was surveyed on 13 November 1724.

== Rebuild at Deptford 1725–1727 ==
She was dismantled at Deptford in preparation for rebuilding as a 374 tom 20-gun sixth rate. Her rebuild commenced in January 1725 with her launching on 8 August 1727. The dimensions after rebuild were gundeck 106 feet 0 inches (32.3 metres) with a keel length of 87 feet 9 inches (26.7 metres) for tonnage calculation. The breadth would be 28 feet 4 inches (8.6 metres) with a depth of hold of 9 ft 2 in (2.8 m). The tonnage calculation would be 37466/94 tons. The gun armament as established in 1713 would be twenty 6-pounder 19 hundredweight (cwt) guns mounted on wooden trucks. She was completed for sea on 2 September 1727 at a cost of £6,723.16.4d. (Note: A total cost accounting for inflation of approximately £1,185,100 in today's money.)

== Commissioned service after rebuild ==
She was commissioned in 1728 under the command of Captain John Byng, RN In July 1728 she was under the command of Captain John Stanley, RN for Wager's Fleet in the straits, then moved to the Mediterranean. In 1752 Captain Henry Medley was in command for secret service in 1732 then to Maryland in 1733 and then to the Barbary Coast in 1734. She underwent a middling repair and refitted at Sheerness for £1,181.10.4d (Note: A total cost accounting for inflation of approximately £221,200 in today's money.) from March to May 1735. After completion, she was commissioned under Captain John Durell, RN for service in the English Channel. In 1736, Captain Richard Norris took command for Tagus and then to the Mediterranean. Upon her return, she underwent a middling repair at Portsmouth for £4,296.5.5d (Note: A total cost accounting for inflation of approximately £725,200 in today's money.) from May through October 1740. She was recommissioned in July 1740 under Captain Purvis, RN. Captain George Cokburne, RN took command in June 1741 and was off Oporto, followed by Captain Thorp Fowke, RN in May 1742 for the North Sea, and Captain Philip Durell, RN took command in 1743. She was to have been fitted for service in the West Indies but this was cancelled. She underwent a small repair at Sheerness costing £2,371.1.5d between December 1743 and January 1744. (Note: A total cost accounting for inflation of approximately £510,100 in today's money.) Captain Richard Chadwick, RN took command in January 1744 for service in the North Sea followed by Captain Coningsby Norbury, RN in November 1744 and Captain John Barker in September 1745. November 1746 she was in the Thames approaches under Captain Frederick Hyde, RN. Between October 1747 and February 1748 she underwent a middling repair at Sheerness for £2,167.18.8d. (Note: A total cost accounting for inflation of approximately £411,000 in today's money.) She was paid off in July 1748 and underwent a survey on 13 December 1748.

== Disposition ==
HMS Gibraltar was sold by Admiralty Order (AO) 23 December 1748 for £340 (Note: A total cost accounting for inflation of approximately £64,500 in today's money.) on 16 March 1749.
