= HMS Deal Castle (1706) =

British warship

History

Great Britain
- Name: HMS Deal Castle
- Builder: Richard Burchett, Rotherhithe
- Launched: 9 September 1706
- Acquired: 2 August 1706
- Commissioned: 1707
- Out of service: 12 December 1722
- Reinstated: May 1727
- Fate: Broken at Deptford 14 August 1746

General characteristics
- Type: 20-gun sixth rate
- Tons burthen: 272 18/94 bm
- Length: 98 ft 2 in (29.9 m) gundeck; 74 ft 6 in (22.7 m) keel for tonnage
- Beam: 26 ft 2.5 in (8.0 m) for tonnage
- Depth of hold: 11 ft 0 in (3.4 m)
- Sail plan: ship-rigged
- Armament: 20 × 6-pdrs on upper deck; 4 × 4-pdrs guns on quarterdeck

General characteristics As Rebuilt 1727
- Class & type: 20=gun, Sixth Rate
- Tons burthen: 3755/94 bm
- Length: 106 ft 1 in (32.33 m) gundeck; 87 ft 10 in (26.77 m) keel for tonnage
- Beam: 28 ft 4 in (8.64 m) maximum
- Depth of hold: 9 ft 2 in (2.79 m)
- Sail plan: ship-rigged
- Armament: 20 × 6-pdrs on upper deck

HMS Deal Castle was a 24-gun sixth-rate ship of the Royal Navy, purchased in 1706 and in service in West Indies, North America and English waters until 1727 when she was rebuilt at Sheerness. She commissioned after her rebuild in May 1727 and served in Home waters, North America and the West Indies. She was finally broken at Deptford in August 1746.

Deal Castle was the second named ship since it was used for a 24-gun sixth rate launched at Deptford Dockyard on 6 November 1697 and taken by the French off Dunkirk on 3 July 1706.

== Specifications and construction ==
Initially intended for merchant service, the vessel was purchased for naval use while still under construction at Richard Burchett of Rotherhithe on 2 August 1706. She was launched on 9 September 1706. Her gun deck was 98 feet 2 inches (29.9 metres) with her keel 74 feet 6 inches (22.7 metres) reported for tonnage. Her breadth was 26 feet 2.5 inches (8.0 metres). Her depth of hold was 11 feet 0 inches (3.4 metres). Her builder's Measure tonnage was 27218/94 tons. She carried a standardize armament of twenty 6-pounders on the upper deck (UD) and four 4-pounders on the quarterdeck. She was a full-rigged ship.

== Commissioned service ==
She was commissioned in 1707 under the command of Commander Charles Howard, RN, for the West Indies. In August 1707 after Commander Howard had drowned, Commander Henry Blimstone, RN, took command in the West Indies. In 1709 Commander John Codner, RN, took command for service in the North Sea and English Channel and later to Jamaica. He was promoted to captain in January 1713, but died on 23 April 1714. In April 1714 Commander (promoted Captain September 1714) Francis Willis, RN, prepared for service on the Scottish Coast at Leigh. In 1717 she went to Newfoundland.

== Rebuild at Sheerness 1727 ==
She was docked at Sheerness for dismantling and preparation for rebuilding as a 375 ton (builder's measure) 20 gun sixth rate in accordance with the 1719 Establishment specifications under the guidance of the Master Shipwright of Sheerness, John Ward. Her rebuild was ordered on 3 January 1723 and launched (floated out of dock) on 6 April 1727. Her new dimensions were now gundeck 106 feet 1 inch (32.3 metres) with her keel 87 feet 10 inches (26.8 metres) reported for tonnage. Her breadth was 28 feet 4 inches (8.6 metres). Her depth of hold was 9 feet 2 inches (2.8 metres). Her builder's Measure tonnage was 3755/94 tons. She carried a standardize armament of twenty 6-pounders on the upper deck (UD). She was a full rigged ship. Her rebuild was completed on 16 June 1727 at a cost of £3,716.0.11/2. (Note: A total cost accounting for inflation of approximately £579,400 in today's money.)

== Commissioned service after rebuild ==
She was commissioned in May 1727 under Captain Timothy Brett, RN, for service in Home Waters. In 1728 she was under command of Captain Samuel Mead, RN. She was paid off in November 1731 and recommissioned around the same time under the command of Captain David Aubin, RN. In March 1734 she was under command of Captain Robert Shorting, RN, who died on 8 August 1734 and Captain William Knight assumed command to bring the ship back to Home Waters paying off in August 1735. She underwent a refit from March to July 1738 at a cost of £4,033.19.9d (Note: A total cost accounting for inflation of approximately £900 in today's money.) at Deptford on 14 August 1746. She was recommissioned in June 1738 under the command of Captain Temple West, RN, for service in Home Waters. In October 1739 she went to Halifax, Nova Scotia then off Tagus in 1740. February 1741 she came under command of Captain John Hamilton, RN, and he sailed with the Lisbon convoy in May 1741. In December 1741 Captain Jacon Elton, RN, took command for service in the Western Approaches. She was at Vigo with HMS Looe in on 7 July 1742. Captain Samuel Goddard, RN, took command in February 1743 for service in the West Indies. She captured the privateer, Le Bien Aime on 23 February 1744. By September 1744 she was under the command of Captain Thomas Somers, RN. She took the privateers, La Fidele and La Providence on 16 May 1645. She returned to Home Waters and paid off in December 1745.

== Disposition ==
She was surveyed then sold for £191 (Note: A total cost accounting for inflation of approximately £36,300 in today's money.) at Deptford on 14 August 1746.
