= HMS Bideford (1712) =

History

Great Britain
- Name: HMS Bideford
- Ordered: 9 October 1711
- Builder: Royal Dockyard, Deptford
- Launched: 14 March 1712
- Completed: 2 April 1712
- Commissioned: 1712
- Fate: Foundered off Flamborough Head 18 March 1736

General characteristics
- Type: 24-gun Sixth Rate
- Tons burthen: 281 bm
- Length: 94 ft 3 in (28.7 m) gundeck; 76 ft 8 in (23.4 m) keel for tonnage
- Beam: 26 ft 3 in (8.0 m) for tonnage
- Depth of hold: 11 ft 6 in (3.5 m)
- Sail plan: ship-rigged
- Armament: 20 × 6-pdr 19 cwt guns on wooden trucks (UD); 4 × 4-pdr 12 cwt guns on wooden trucks (QD)

General characteristics as rebuilt 1727
- Type: 20-gun Sixth Rate
- Tons burthen: 371 45/94 bm
- Length: 106 ft 0 in (32.3 m) gundeck; 87 ft 0 in (26.5 m) keel for tonnage
- Beam: 28 ft 4 in (8.6 m) for tonnage
- Depth of hold: 9 ft 2 in (2.8 m)
- Sail plan: ship-rigged
- Armament: 20 × 6-pdr 19 cwt guns on wooden trucks (UD)

HMS Bideford was a member of the Gibraltar Group of 24-gun sixth rates. After commissioning she spent her career in West Indies, Morocco and Portugal on trade protection duties. She was rebuilt at Chatham in 1727. After her rebuild she served in Home Waters, North America and the Mediterranean on trade protection. She foundered off Flamborough Head in 1736.

Bideford was the second named vessel since it was used for a 24-gun sixth rate launched by Barret of Harwich on 25 October 1695 and wrecked in Point Baque on 12 November 1699.

== Construction ==
She was ordered on 9 October 1711 from Deptford Dockyard to be built under the guidance of Joseph Allin, Master Shipwright of Deptford. She was launched on 14 March 1712. She was completed for sea on 2 April 1712.

== Commissioned service ==
She was commissioned in 1712 under the command of Commander Robert Harward, RN (promoted to captain in January 1713) for 'owling' then went to Jamaica in 1714/15. Captain William Rowley, RN was in command in June 1716 and was off Sale, Morocco during 1717/18. She underwent a refit at Deptford during March/April 1719 at a cost of Captain Beaumont Waldron, RN for service in the Channel. She was refitted at Deptford from March to July 1720 at a cost of 1,164.6.6d. (Note: A total cost accounting for inflation of approximately £227,000 in today's money.) Recommissioned in March 1719 under the command of Captain Edward Gregory, RN she sailed with Vice-Admiral Sir James Mighell squadron to Vigo. In 1720 she was patrolling the English Channel then moved to Ireland in 1721/23. She was surveyed on 20 March 1726 and docked at Deptford on 8 February 1727 for rebuilding.

== Rebuild at Deptford 1727 ==
She was dismantled at Deptford in preparation for rebuilding as a 374 tom 20-gun sixth rate. Her rebuild commenced in February 1727 with her launching on 2 October 1727. The dimensions after rebuild were gundeck 106 feet 0 inches (32.3 metres) with a keel length of 87 feet 0 inches (26.5 metres) for tonnage calculation. The breadth would be 28 feet 4 inches (8.6 metres) with a depth of hold of 9 ft 2 in (2.8 m). The tonnage calculation would be 37145/94 tons. The gun armament as established in 1713 would be twenty 6-pounder 19 hundredweight (cwt) guns mounted on wooden trucks. She was completed for sea on 1 December 1727 at a cost of £6,886.12.4d (Note: A total cost accounting for inflation of approximately £1,213,900 in today's money.) plus £488.18.10d (Note: A total cost accounting for inflation of approximately £86,100 in today's money.) including fitting.

== Commissioned Service after Rebuild ==
She was commissioned in October 1727 under the command of Captain Coville Mayne, RN for service in Virginia. She returned home and paid off in January 1713. She recommissioned in January 1713 under Captain Curtis Barnett, RN for service in the Mediterranean during 1731 thru 1733. She returned to Home Waters for service in the English Channel in 1734. 1735 saw a change in command to Captain Matthew Consett, RN for service in the English Channel and the North Sea.

== Disposition ==
HMS Bideford foundered through a leak off Flamborough Head on 18 March 1736.
