= HMS Swan (1694) =

History

England
- Name: HMS Swan
- Ordered: 2 May 1694
- Builder: Robert & John Castle, Deptford
- Launched: 13 September 1694
- Commissioned: 2 June 1695
- Fate: Lost with all hands 17 August 1707

General characteristics
- Type: 20-gun sixth rate
- Tons burthen: 249 29/94 bm
- Length: 93 ft 3 in (28.4 m) gundeck; 78 ft 1 in (23.8 m) keel for tonnage
- Beam: 24 ft 6 in (7.5 m) for tonnage
- Depth of hold: 10 ft 8 in (3.3 m)
- Armament: initially as ordered; 20 × sakers on wooden trucks (UD); 4 × 3-pdr on wooden trucks (QD); 1703 Establishment; 20 × 6-pdrs on wooden trucks (UD); 4 × 4-pdr on wooden trucks (QD)

HMS Swan was a member of the standardised 20-gun sixth rates built at the end of the 17th century. After commissioning she went to the West Indies, then returned for service in the Irish Sea and English Channel. She then returned to the West Indies where she was lost with all hands in 1707.

Swan (also spelt Swann) was the eleventh ship of that name. The first was a ballinger acquired in March 1417 and sold on 1 April 1423. (Note: The name of the vessel is spelt 'Swan' in ref. Winfield and spelt 'Swann' in ref. Colledge.)

== Construction ==
She was ordered in the second batch of eight ships from on 2 May 1694 to be built under contract by Robert & John Castle of Deptford. She was launched on 13 September 1694.

== Commissioned service ==
She was commissioned on 2 June 1695 under the command of Captain Timothy Bridges, RN for service with Robert Wilmot's squadron in the West Indies. Captain Thomas Kenny, RN took over command on 9 August 1695. Swan returned to home waters in 1696 for service in the Irish sea. On 27 August 1697 Captain William Bloyes, RN took command and the ship was assigned to the English Channel. Captain Thomas Day, RN was her commander in 1699 through to 1700 for service in the Irish Sea, Captain Bloyes reassumed command in 1702 through 1705, remaining in the Irish Sea. In 1706, she came under the command of Commander Robert Clarke, RN for service in the Leeward Islands. In 1707 Commander Charles Howard, RN took over command.

== Loss ==
HMS Swan was lost and presumed foundered with all hands in a tropical storm on 17 August 1707.
