= HMS Greyhound (1720) =

British warship

History

United Kingdom
- Name: HMS Greyhound
- Ordered: 4 July 1719
- Builder: Royal Dockyard, Deptford
- Cost: £3,041.11.3d plus £480.0.83/4 for fitting
- Launched: 13 February 1720
- Completed: 25 February 1720
- Commissioned: 1720
- Fate: Broken at Deptford in June 1741

General characteristics
- Type: 20-gun Sixth Rate
- Tons burthen: 371 18/94 bm
- Length: 105 ft 0 in (32.0 m) gundeck; 86 ft 2 in (26.3 m) keel for tonnage
- Beam: 28 ft 5.5 in (8.7 m) for tonnage
- Depth of hold: 9 ft 2 in (2.8 m)
- Armament: 20 × 6-pdr 19 cwt guns on wooden trucks (UD)

HMS Greyhound was a member of the 1719 Establishment Group of 20-gun sixth rates. After commissioning she spent the first part of her career in North America and the West Indies. Later she was in Home Waters and finishing in the Mediterranean on trade protection duties. She was sold at Deptford in October 1742.

Greyhound was the ninth named vessel since it was used for a 45-gun ship launched at Deptford in 1545, rebuilt in 1558 and wrecked off the Rye in 1573.

== Construction ==
She was ordered on 4 July 1719 from Deptford Dockyard to be built under the guidance of Richard Stacey, Master Shipwright of Deptford. She was launched on 13 February 1720. She was completed for sea on 25 February 1720 at a cost of £3,211.13.53/4d (Note: A total cost accounting for inflation of approximately £573,700 in today's money.) plus £265.6.113/4 (Note: A total cost accounting for inflation of approximately £47,400 in today's money.) for fitting.

== Commissioned service ==
She was commissioned in 1720 under the command of Captain John Waldron, RN for service in the Baltic. She was fitted at Deptford for service at New York in March 1721. She was captured by the Spanish off Cuba on 19 April 1721 during which Captain Waldron and the surgeon were killed. The British recaptured her later that evening. Captain John Condett, RN took command in late April 1721 at New York. In July 1722 Captain Peter Solgard, RN took command. She returned home and was fitted at Deptford for service in Scotland in February 1725, however was fitted in May for service in Newfoundland. She was with Hosier's Fleet in the West Indies during 1726/27. December 1727 she was under Captain John Gascoigne, RN followed by Captain Edward Baker, RN in March 1728. She was ordered home in September to pay off. She was refitted at Deptford between February and April 1729 at a cost of £3,452.10.2d. (Note: A total cost accounting for inflation of approximately £571,800 in today's money.) In 1729 she recommissioned under Captain Sir Yelverton Peyton, RN for service at Virginia. She returned home for a middling repair at Deptford from August 1732 to January 1733 at a cost of £2,557.7.5d. (Note: A total cost accounting for inflation of approximately £526,600 in today's money.) Captain James Cornwall, RN recommissioned her in 1733 for service on the Barbary coast. On returning home she was fitted for channel service by Admiralty Order (AO) 27 March 1734. In March 1734 under Captain John Ambrose, RN she was on impressment service. She moved to Tagus in 1735 then on to the Mediterranean in 1736. In April 1740 she came under Captain Edward Peyton, RN then later that year when ordered home she was under command of Lieutenant Richard Watkins, RN for passage to Home Waters.

== Disposition ==
HMS Greyhound was surveyed at Deptford on 27 November 1740. She was ordered to be broken by Admiralty Order (AO) 12 February 1741 and breaking was completed in June 1741.
