= HMS Bideford (1695) =

History

England
- Name: HMS Bideford
- Ordered: 11 May 1694
- Builder: Nicholas Barret, Harwich
- Launched: 25 October 1695
- Commissioned: 19 October 1695
- Fate: Wrecked 12 November 1699

General characteristics
- Type: 20-gun sixth rate
- Tons burthen: 255 73/94 bm
- Length: 93 ft 1 in (28.4 m) gundeck; 78 ft 6 in (23.9 m) keel for tonnage
- Beam: 24 ft 9 in (7.5 m) for tonnage
- Depth of hold: 10 ft 9 in (3.3 m)
- Armament: initially as ordered; 20 × sakers on wooden trucks (UD); 4 × 3-pdr on wooden trucks (QD); 1703 establishment; 20 × 6-pdrs on wooden trucks (UD); 4 × 4-pdr on wooden trucks (QD)

HMS Bideford was a member of the standardized 20-gun sixth rates built at the end of the 17th century. After commissioning she spent her short career in the West Indies, mainly employed as a trade protection vessel. She was wrecked in 1699.

Bideford (spelt Biddeford or Bideford) was the first named vessel in the Royal Navy. (Note: Ref Winfield spells her name as Bideford whereas ref Colledge spells her name as Biddeford.)

== Construction ==
She was ordered in the Second Batch of eight ships to be built under contract by Nicholas Barret of Harwich. She was launched on 25 October 1695.

== Commissioned service ==
She was commissioned on 19 October 1695 under the command of Captain Thomas Thatcher, RN for service in the West Indies. Thatcher died on 20 October 1697. Captain Samuel Martin, RN took command on the 18th. In 1699 Captain Henry Searle was in command until he drowned in her wreck on 12 November 1699.

== Loss ==
HMS Bideford was wrecked on the Isle of Ash off Hispaniola on 12 November 1699.
