= HMS Penzance (1695) =

History

England
- Name: HMS Penzance
- Ordered: 11 May 1694
- Builder: Thomas Ellis, Shoreham
- Launched: 22 April 1695
- Commissioned: Spring 1695
- Fate: Sold 24 September 1713

General characteristics
- Type: 20-gun Sixth Rate
- Tons burthen: 253 69/94 bm
- Length: 94 ft 3 in (28.7 m) gundeck; 77 ft 10.5 in (23.7 m) keel for tonnage
- Beam: 24 ft 9 in (7.5 m) for tonnage
- Depth of hold: 10 ft 9 in (3.3 m)
- Armament: initially as ordered; 20 × sakers on wooden trucks (UD); 4 × 3-pdr on wooden trucks (QD); 1703 Establishment; 20 × 6-pdrs on wooden trucks (UD); 4 × 4-pdr on wooden trucks (QD)

HMS Penzance was a member of the standardized 20-gun sixth rates built at the end of the 17th century. After commissioning she spent her career in Home Waters with a foray to the Moroccan coast. Mainly employed as a trade protection vessel. She was sold in 1713.

Penzance was the first named vessel in the Royal Navy.

== Construction ==
She was ordered in the Second Batch of eight ships to be built under contract by Thomas Ellis of Shoreham. She was launched on 22 April 1695.

== Commissioned service ==
Commissioning in the Spring of 1695 under Captain Horatio Townsend, RN, who oversaw her fitting out in July 1695. On 29 January 1696 Captain John Cooper took command, followed by Captain John Aston on 7 May 1697 for service in Ireland. Captain Aston was dismissed on 6 March 1698. In 1699, Captain Richard Wyatt took command for Sale, Morocco in 1700. During 1701 thru 1704 she was under the command of Commander Thomas Lawrence, RN while serving in the Irish Channel. From 1705 thru 1707 she was under the command of Robert Studely, RN remaining in the Irish channel. Commsnder John Parr, RN commanded her during 1708 through 1712 for service in the North Sea. She was laid up at Deptford by Admiralty Order (AO) 22 February 1712.

== Loss ==
HMS Penzance was sold to John Bevois for £493 on 24 September 1713. (Note: A total amount accounting for inflation of approximately £87,500 in today's money.)
