= HMS Flamborough (1707) =

History

Great Britain
- Name: HMS Flamborough
- Ordered: 30 July 1706
- Builder: Woolwich Dockyard
- Laid down: 1706
- Launched: 29 January 1707
- Decommissioned: 1748
- Fate: Sold out of service, 10 January 1749
- Notes: Participated in: Siege of St. Augustine; War of Jenkins' Ear

General characteristics as originally built
- Class & type: 24-gun Sixth rate
- Tons burthen: 261 49/94 bm
- Length: 94 ft 0 in (28.65 m) (gundeck); 79 ft 8 in (24.28 m) (keel)
- Beam: 25 ft 0 in (7.62 m)
- Depth of hold: 10 ft 8 in (3.25 m)
- Sail plan: Full-rigged ship
- Complement: 115 (85 in peacetime)
- Armament: 20 × 6-pounder guns on upper deck; 4 × 4-pounder guns on quarter deck
- Notes: Rebuilt, 1727

General characteristics after 1727 rebuild
- Class & type: 20-gun Sixth rate
- Tons burthen: 377 41/94 bm
- Length: 105 ft 11 in (32.28 m) (gundeck); 87 ft 10.5 in (26.784 m) (keel)
- Beam: 28 ft 5 in (8.66 m)
- Depth of hold: 9 ft 3 in (2.82 m)
- Propulsion: Sails
- Sail plan: Full-rigged ship
- Complement: 140
- Armament: 20 × 6-pounder guns
- Notes: Sold 10 January 1749

HMS Flamborough was a Royal Navy post ship, launched in 1707 with 24 guns. She was the first Royal Navy vessel to be stationed in South Carolina, holding that position from 1719 to 1721. She was rebuilt as a considerably larger 20-gun vessel in 1727, and was employed during the following decade off Ireland and later on the Jamaica station. After a period in New York she returned to the Carolinas in 1739, patrolling the coast and playing a minor role in the War of Jenkins' Ear. She returned to England in 1745. After undergoing a major repair she was recommissioned under Captain Jervis Porter in April 1746, and served in the North Sea for the following two years. She was sold out of naval service in 1749.

== Construction and early service ==
Flamborough was laid down in Woolwich Dockyard as a 24-gun post ship in 1706 and launched on 29 January 1707. Her earliest recorded duty was protecting the Yarmouth fisheries in 1707 under Commander William Clarke, then with Byng's Channel fleet in 1708. Commanded by Captain Charles Vanburgh, she captured two French privateers in the North Sea during 1710, the Trompeuse on 22 May and the St François on 5 June. In 1711, now under Commander Thomas Howard, she was assigned to escort merchant convoys and intercept French privateers in English waters between Newcastle and Leith. In late 1711 she captured a French privateer in a brief action off Bass Rock in the Firth of Forth; the privateer's Scottish captain was subsequently convicted of high treason and executed in London.

Flamborough served in the North Sea from 1718 to 1719, including participation in the May 1719 capture of Eilean Donan Castle during the Jacobite rising of 1719. From October 1719 to July 1721, the vessel was stationed in South Carolina under Captain John Hildesley, the first Royal Navy ship assigned to these waters.^{[a]} In 1720, Flamborough defended against a Spanish fleet in the Raid on Nassau. In 1727 she was rebuilt at Portsmouth as a 20-gun vessel. Ten years later she was again posted to the Americas, sailing for New York in March 1738 under Captain Vincent Pearce.^{[b]}

== War with Spain ==
By the late 1730s hostilities appeared imminent between Britain and Spain and the British Admiralty had concerns regarding the security of settlements along the Carolina and Georgia coasts. On 11 June 1739 Admiralty orders were issued for a six-vessel squadron, including Flamborough, to "protect the said settlements ... by taking, burning or otherwise destroying the ships, vessels or boats which the Spaniards may employ thereon."^{[c]} Flamborough thereupon left her New York station for the Carolinas, arriving ahead of the declaration of war with Spain in October.

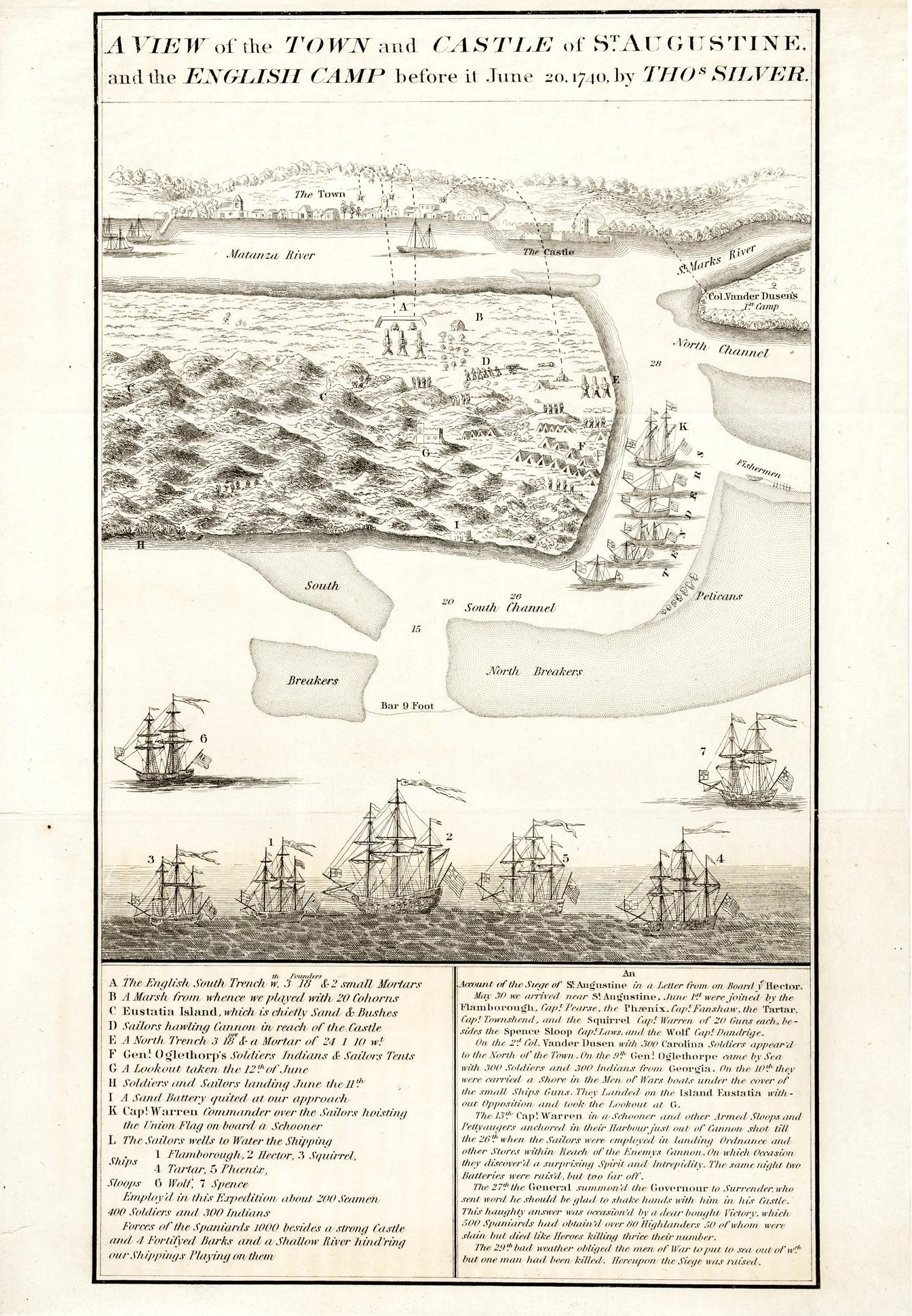
A View of the Town and Castle of St. Augustine, and the English Camp before it June 20, 1740, Flamborough shown. The Gentleman's Magazine, 1740

Her first wartime service was in May 1740 when she anchored in the mouth of the St Johns River to protect the disembarkation of British troops assigned to the Siege of St. Augustine. In 1742 she came under the command of Captain Joseph Hamar, with orders to patrol between Georgia and the Bahamas. In June she briefly engaged Spanish vessels near St. Augustine, Florida, driving several enemy vessels aground before being forced to retreat towards St. Simons Island. The engagement cost Flamborough seventeen of her crew.

Returning in August she was part of a five-vessel squadron under the overall command of Sir Thomas Frankland, assigned to lure the Spanish into battle off St. Augustine, but was never directly engaged. In October she returned to British waters off the Carolinas, anchoring off Hobcaw alongside HMS Rose. While in Hobcaw she lost three men to desertion, replacing them with seamen impressed from local merchant craft.

The ship was struck by lightning in early January 1743, suffering heavy damage to her fore and main masts. She was put in dock in Charleston, during which fourteen of her crew were transferred to HMS Rye under the command of Captain Charles Hardy. By mid-year she was fit to return to sea, proving her capacity with the capture of French privateer La Vendre off South Carolina on 14 October.

In late October 1743 she was joined in Charleston by the larger and more heavily armed HMS Looe, whose captain Ashby Utting assumed overall command of the Carolinas naval squadron. Hamar remained aboard Flamborough as commander and the ship stayed in service off South Carolina until 1 June 1745, when she returned to England. Hamar was transferred to the command of her eventual replacement, the 40-gun HMS Adventure which arrived in Charleston harbour on 10 July 1747.

On arrival in England Flamborough was relocated to Woolwich Dockyard for major repairs. Works began in January 1746 and lasted for five months at a cost of £4,624. She was recommissioned in April 1746 under Captain Jervis Porter and put back to sea in May for cruising and patrol along the English coast. Throughout 1747 she engaged and captured five French privateers – Le Chasseur in June, Le Roi David and Le Louis Quinzième in July, L'Alexandre in October and Le Ricaud in December. Both Le Roi David and Le Louis Quinzième were subsequently purchased by Admiralty, with prize money paid to Flamborough's crew.

== Decommission ==
The ageing Flamborough was sold out of naval service on 10 January 1749.

== Notes ==
=== Footnotes ===
^ [a]Royal Navy vessels had previously been stationed at New York and along the coasts of New England, Maryland and Virginia.
^[b]The 1742 trial of a man named Robert Rhodes on charges of forgery refers to a sailor, John Thompson, who had previously lived in London but "in March 1737, he enter'd on board His Majesty's Ship the Flamborough" and died aboard the vessel in Turtle Bay, New York in August 1739. A witness statement reads in part: "I remember when he first went to Sea; it was about four Years ago last January, in the Year thirty-seven. He never was a Seaman before that, by what I have heard him say, and he work'd with me within a Day or two before he went to Sea. He has apply'd to several People who had been at Sea to inform him about the Business, for he was going ... to Captain Pierce of the Flamborough."
^[c]The other Royal Navy vessels ordered to patrol Carolina waters from this date were Phoenix, Hector, Squirrel, Tartar and Spence.
