= HMS Squirrel (1707) =

History

Great Britain
- Name: Squirrel
- Ordered: 26 March 1707
- Builder: Royal Dockyard, Woolwich
- Launched: 29 December 1707
- Commissioned: 1708
- Out of service: April 1727
- Fate: Rebuilt Woolwich 1727; finally sold at Woolwich 17 October 1749

General characteristics
- Type: 24-gun Sixth Rate
- Tons burthen: 262 59/94 bm
- Length: 94 ft 0 in (28.7 m) gundeck; 79 ft 0 in (24.1 m) keel for tonnage
- Beam: 25 ft 0 in (7.6 m) for tonnage
- Depth of hold: 10 ft 8 in (3.3 m)
- Armament: 20 × 6-pdrs on wooden trucks (UD); 4 × 4-pdr on wooden trucks (QD)

General characteristics As Rebuilt 1727
- Class & type: 20=gun, Sixth Rate
- Tons burthen: 37622/94 bm
- Length: 106 ft 2 in (32.36 m) gundeck; 87 ft 9 in (26.75 m) keel for tonnage
- Beam: 28 ft 5 in (8.66 m) maximum
- Depth of hold: 9 ft 2 in (2.79 m)
- Sail plan: ship-rigged
- Armament: 20 × 6-pdrs on upper deck

HMS Squirrel was designed by Richard Stacey, Master Shipwright of Woolwich. Her design was based on the standardize 20-gun sixth rates. After commissioning she was assigned to Home Waters then the Mediterranean. She took a privateer in 1710. She was dismantled at Deptford with her timbers sent to Woolwich Dockyard for rebuilding as a 374-ton (bm). She was finally broken in 1749.

Squirrel was the fifth ship so named. The name had previously been used for a discovery vessel with Sir Humphrey Gilbert in 1582 and lost in 1583.

== Construction ==
She was ordered on 26 March 1707 from Woolwich Dockyard to be built under the guidance of their Master Shipwright, Richard Stacey. She was launched on 29 December 1707.

== Commissioned service ==
She was commissioned in 1708 under the command of Commander James Hodsoll, RN for service with Admiral Byng's Fleet in the English Channel and North Sea. During 1710 she came under command of Commander John Gray, RN for service at the Firth of Forth. On 1 June 1710 she took the privateer, La Roue de la Fortune in the North Sea. Commander James Campbell, RN took command in 1711 for service in the English Channel before going to New England. In 1712 back in Home Waters she was on Fisheries patrol, moving to Irish waters in 1714 then on to the Mediterranean. In July 1715 Captain Thomas Smart, RN took command for operations against pirates on the North-East coast.

== Rebuild at Deptford 1727 ==
She was docked at Deptford for dismantling in April 1727. Her timbers were then sent to Woolwich Dockyard to facilitate her rebuild. She was ordered to be rebuilt as a 374-ton (builder's measure) 20 gun sixth rate under the guidance of the Woolwich Master Shipwright, John Hayward on 23 March 1727. Her keel was placed on 27 April 1727 with her relaunched on 19 October 1727. Her dimensions were now gundeck of 106 feet 2 inches (32.4 metres) with her keel 87 feet 9 inches (26.7 metres) reported for tonnage. Her breadth was 28 feet 5 inches (8.7 metres). Her depth of hold was 9 feet 2 inches (2.8 metres). Her builder's Measure tonnage was 37622/94 tons. She carried a standardize armament of twenty 6-pounders on the upper deck (UD). She was a full rigged ship. She was completed for sea at a total cost of £4,546.19.10d (Note: A total cost accounting for inflation of approximately £708,800 in today's money.) for building.

== Commissioned Service after Rebuild ==
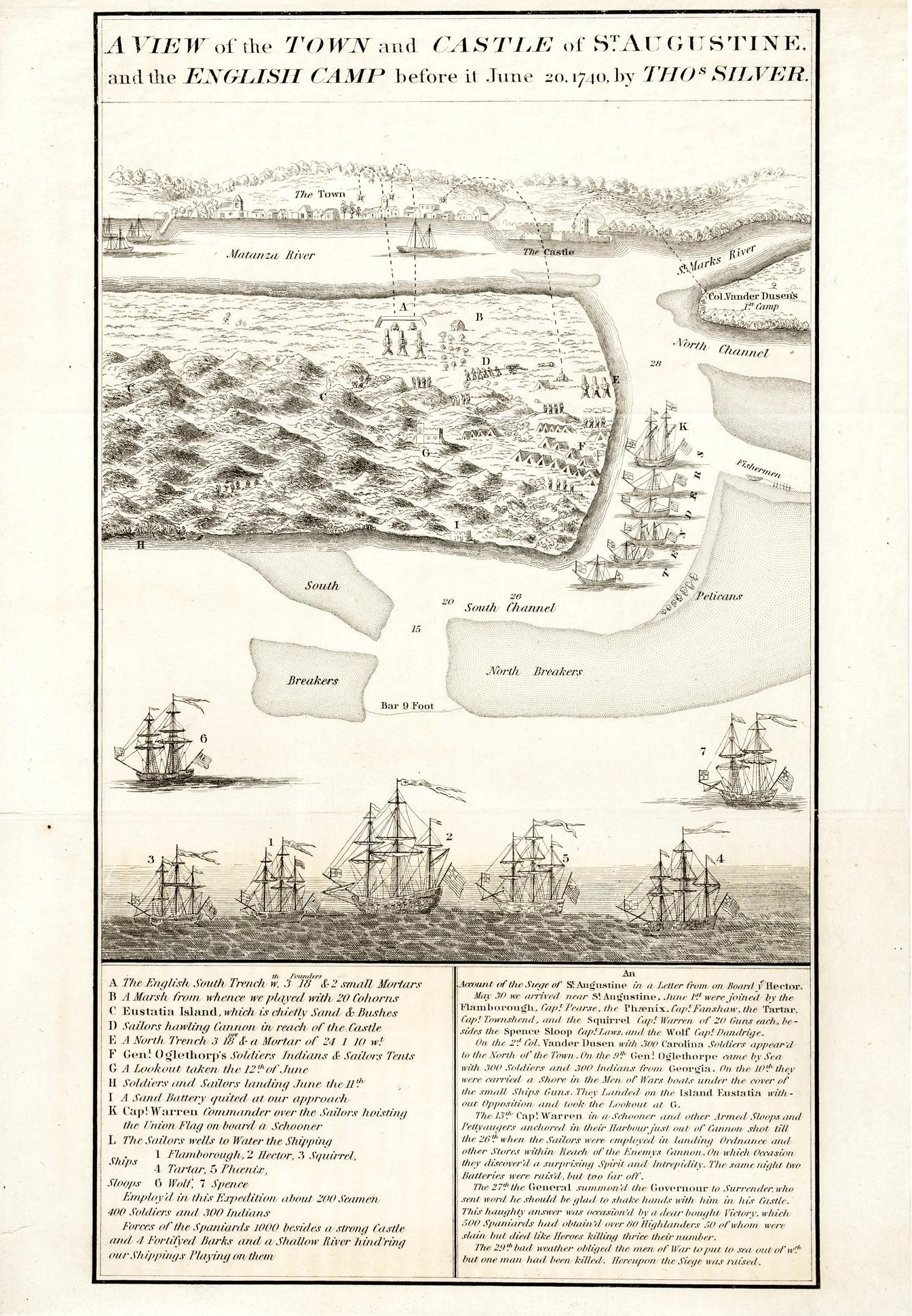
A View of the Town and Castle of St. Augustine, and the English Camp before it June 20, 1740, Squirrel shown. The Gentleman's Magazine, 1740

She was commissioned in January 1728 under Captain Henry Osborn for service in the Mediterranean. She returned to pay off on 27 December 1731.Captain George Anson took command in 1732 for service at South Carolina. She returned and underwent a small repair at Woolwich at a cost of £2,626.11.9d (Note: A total cost accounting for inflation of approximately £491,800 in today's money.) from August thru October 1735. Recommissioning in December 1735 under Captain Peter Warren she proceeded to New England, then took part in Georgia operation where she took a sloop on 28 April 1740. She took part in operations at Cartagena during March and April 1741. She took privateers San Francisco on 1 May 1741 and L'Etoile du Nord on 26 June 1741, She conveyed Mast ships from New England to Home Waters. She was surveyed on 31 December 1741. She underwent a great repair at Deptford at a cost of £6,631.16.2d (Note: A total cost accounting for inflation of approximately £1,259,900 in today's money.) from February to August 1742. She was recommissioned in June 1742 under Captain Francis Geary followed by Captain Thomas Williams in April 1744 for service in the English Channel. She was under Captain Archibald Stuart for service on the Yarmouth fishery in February 1745. Captain John Douglas took command in April 1746 then Captain James Gambier in December 1747 for cruising.

== Disposition ==
She was surveyed on 5 July 1749. By Admiralty Order (AO) 17 July 1749 she was sold at Woolwich for £260 (Note: A total cost accounting for inflation of approximately £49,600 in today's money.) on 17 October 1749.
