= List of ship launches in 1756 =

The list of ship launches in 1756 includes a chronological list of some ships launched in 1756.

Date	Ship	Class	Builder	Location	Country	Notes
3 January	Sauvage	Licorne-class frigate	Jean Geoffroy	Brest	Kingdom of France	For French Navy.
20 January	Deal Castle	Squirrel-class post ship	Adam Hayes	Deptford Dockyard	Great Britain	For Royal Navy.
January	Diligente	Corvette		Le Havre	Kingdom of France	For French Navy.
1 February	Triunfante	Triunfante-class ship of the line	Jorge Juan	Reales Astilleros de Esteiro, Ferrol	Spain	For Spanish Navy.
3 February	Spy	Bonetta-class sloop	Robert Inwood	Rotherhithe	Great Britain	For Royal Navy.
4 February	Bonetta	Bonetta-class sloop	Henry Bird	Rotherhithe	Great Britain	For Royal Navy.
18 February	Royal George	First rate	William Lee	Woolwich Dockyard	Great Britain	For Royal Navy.
28 February	Hunter	Hunter-class sloop	Wells Stanton	Deptford Dockyard	Great Britain	For Royal Navy.
2 March	Bideford	Sixth rate	Adam Heyes	Deptford Dockyard	Great Britain	For Royal Navy.
2 March	Mercury	Gibraltar-class ship of the line	John Barnard	Harwich	Great Britain	For Royal Navy.
3 March	Namur	Second rate	John Lock	Chatham Dockyard	Great Britain	For Royal Navy.
18 March	Dichoso	Triunfante-class ship of the line	Juan Jorge	Reales Astilleros de Esteiro, Ferrol	Spain	For Spanish Navy.
20 March	Merlin	Bonetta-class sloop		Rotherhithe	Great Britain	For Royal Navy.
31 March	Viper	Hunter-class sloop	Thomas West	Deptford	Great Britain	For Royal Navy.
March	Aigrette	Blonde-class frigate		Le Havre	Kingdom of France	For French Navy.
1 April	Hawk	Hawk-class sloop	Robert Batson	Limehouse	Great Britain	For Royal Navy.
3 April	Tartar	Lowestoffe-class frigate	John Randall	Rotherhithe	Great Britain	For Royal Navy.
17 April	Scarborough	Sixth rate	Hugh Blayees, Blaydes Yard	Hull	Great Britain	For Royal Navy.
29 April	Diligente	Frigate	Joseph-Louis Olliver	Lorient	Kingdom of France	For French East India Company.
1 May	Kennington	Gibraltar-class ship of the line	Henry Adams	Bucklers Hard	Great Britain	For Royal Navy.
14 May	Flamborough	Gibraltar-class ship of the line	Robert Batson	Limehouse	Great Britain	For Royal Navy.
15 May	Aldborough	Gibraltar-class ship of the line	John Perry	Blackwall	Great Britain	For Royal Navy.
17 May	Lowestoffe	Lowestoffe-class frigate	John Greaves	Limehouse	Great Britain	For Royal Navy.
13 June	Monarca	Triunfante-class ship of the line	Reales Astilleros de Esteiro	Ferrol	Spain	For Spanish Navy.
20 June	Océan	Ship of the line	Joseph Véronique-Charles Chapelle	Toulon	Kingdom of France	For French Navy.
June	Abénaquise	Abénaquise-class demi-batterie	Rene-Nicholas Levasseur	Quebec City	New France	For French Navy.
26 July	Diadème	Diadème-class ship of the line	Jacques-Luc Coulomb	Brest	Kingdom of France	For French Navy.
29 July	Diligence	Alderney-class sloop	William Wells & Co.	Deptford	Great Britain	For Royal Navy.
July	London	Sloop of war		Oswego, New York	Thirteen Colonies	For Royal Navy.
July	Mohawk	Sloop of war		Oswego, New York	Thirteen Colonies	For Royal Navy.
10 August	Glorieux	Third rate	Clairin Deslauriers	Rochefort	Kingdom of France	For French Navy.
10 August	Lively	Post ship	Moody Janverin	Bursledon	Great Britain	For Royal Navy.
24 August	Bien-Aimé	East Indiaman			Kingdom of France	For French East India Company.
August	Halifax	Sloop of war		Oswego, New York	Thirteen Colonies	For Royal Navy.
August	Belliqueux	Sphinx-class ship of the line	Pierre Salinoc	Brest	Kingdom of France	For French Navy.
25 September	Diligente	Triunfante-class ship of the line	Reales Astilleros de Esteiro	Ferrol	Spain	For Spanish Navy.
25 September	Union	Second rate		Chatham Dockyard	Great Britain	For Royal Navy.
9 October	Orient	East Indiaman	Antoine Groignard	Lorient	Kingdom of France	For French East India Company.
8 November	Stork	Alderney-class sloop	Daniel Stow & Benjamin Bartlett	Shoreham-by-Sea	Great Britain	For Royal Navy.
16 November	Lawrence	Privateer	Malachy Salter and Robert Saunderson	Halifax	(Kingdom of Great Britain) Nova Scotia	For private owner.
18 November	Zodiaque	Diadème-class ship of the line	Jacques-Luc Coulomb	Brest	Kingdom of France	For French Navy.
27 November	Grønland	Fourth rate	A. Turesen	Copenhagen	Denmark-Norway	For Dano-Norwegian Navy.
November	Raisonnable	Third rate	Pierre Morieau	Rochefort	Kingdom of France	For French Navy.
December	Le Télémaque	Privateer frigate		Marseille	Kingdom of France	For Georges Roux.
Unknown date	Diligence	Snow		Bombay	India	For Bombay Pilot Service.
Unknown date	Fox	East Indiaman		London	Great Britain	For British East India Company.
Unknown date	Hercules	Third rate		Guarnizo	Spain	For Spanish Navy.
Unknown date	La Marie Victoire	Privateer		Le Havre	Kingdom of France	For private owner.
Unknown date	La Subtile	Privateer snow		Dunkirk	Kingdom of France	For Private owner.
Unknown date	Cesar	Cat	Augustin Pic	Rochefort	Kingdom of France	For French Navy.
Unknown date	Le Duc d'Aiguillon	Privateer sloop		Saint-Malo	Kingdom of France	For private owner.
Unknown date	Grue	Cat		Rochefort	Kingdom of France	For French Navy.
Unknown date	Sainte Anne	Third rate		Genoa	Republic of Genoa	
Unknown date	Sejeren	Fourth rate			Denmark-Norway	For Dano-Norwegian Navy.
Unknown date	Vefk-i Devlet	Fourth rate		Constantinople	Ottoman Empire	For Ottoman Navy.
Unknown date	Vestale	Blonde-class frigate		Le Havre	Kingdom of France	For French Navy.
Unknown date	Worcester	East Indiaman		London	Great Britain	For private owner.
