= List of ship launches in 1748 =

The list of ship launches in 1748 includes a chronological list of some ships launched in 1748.

Date	Ship	Class	Builder	Location	Country	Notes
29 January	Nasir-i Bahri	Third rate		Constantinople	Ottoman Empire	For Ottoman Navy.
5 March	Humber	Fifth rate	John Smith	Bursledon	Great Britain	For Royal Navy.
19 March	Doddington	East Indiaman	Wells	Deptford	Great Britain	For British East India Company.
4 April	America	Fifth rate	Nathaniel Messerve	Portsmouth, New Hampshire	Thirteen Colonies	For Royal Navy.
16 April	Vanguard	Third rate	Ewer	East Cowes	Great Britain	For Royal Navy.
3 May	Boston	Sixth rate	Benjamin Hallowell	Boston Massachusetts	Thirteen Colonies	For Royal Navy.
13 June	Saint Laurent	Fourth rate	Rene-Nicolas Levasseur	Quebec City	New France	For French Navy.
18 July	Somerset	Third rate	John Ward	Chatham Dockyard	Great Britain	For Royal Navy.
29 July	Boscawen	East Indiaman		Blackwall	Great Britain	For British East India Company.
13 August	Garland	Garland-class frigate	John Poole	Sheerness Dockyard	Great Britain	For Royal Navy.
13 September	Seahorse	Sixth rate	John Barnard	Ipswich	Great Britain	For Royal Navy.
1 December	Protée	Third rate	François-Guillaume Clarain Des Lauriers	Brest	Kingdom of France	For French Navy.
7 December	Unicorn	Unicorn-class frigate	Benjamin Slade	Plymouth Dockyard	Great Britain	For Royal Navy.
10 December	Lyme	Unicorn-class frigate		Deptford Dockyard	Great Britain	For Royal Navy.
10 December	Sphinx	Sixth rate	John Allen	Rotherhithe	Great Britain	For Royal Navy.
18 December	Kingdom's Wish	Sailing ship		Copenhagen	Denmark-Norway	For Company of General Commerce.
Unknown date	Amsterdam	East Indiaman		Amsterdam	Dutch Republic	For Dutch East India Company.
Unknown date	Bonetto	Sloop		Bombay	India	For Bengal Pilot Service.
Unknown date	Bornholm	Fourth rate			Denmark-Norway	For Dano-Norwegian Navy.
Unknown date	Cholmondely	Cutter			Great Britain	For private owner.
Unknown date	Dolphin	Sloop		Bombay	India	For Bengal Pilot Service.
Unknown date	Draak	Sixth rate	Charles Bentam	Amsterdam	Dutch Republic	For Dutch Navy.
Unknown date	Faam	Unrated ship	Charles Bentham	Amsterdam	Dutch Republic	For Dutch Navy.
Unknown date	Forester	Hoy	Philomon Ewer	Bursledon	Great Britain	For Royal Navy.
Unknown date	Grampus	Sloop		Bombay	India	For Bengal Pilot Service.
Unknown date	Aimable	Victoire-class gabarre		Brest, France	Kingdom of France	For French Navy.
Unknown date	Victoire	Victoire-class gabarre		Brest, France	Kingdom of France	For French Navy.
Unknown date	Charmante	Victoire-class gabarre		Brest	Kingdom of France	For French Navy.
Unknown date	Gaillarde	Victoire-class gabarre		Brest	Kingdom of France	For French Navy.
Unknown date	Postillon	Gunboat		Toulon	Kingdom of France	For French Navy.
Unknown date	Luconia	Snow		Bombay	India	For British East India Company.
Unknown date	Prinses Carolina	Fourth rate	Paulus van Zwijndrecht	Rotterdam	Dutch Republic	For Dutch Navy.
Unknown date	Prins Willem	Third rate		Rotterdam	Dutch Republic	For Dutch Navy.
Unknown date	Warren	East Indiaman			Great Britain	For British East India Company.
