= HMS Tartar =

HMS Tartar has been the name of more than one ship of the British Royal Navy, and may refer to:

- HMS Tartar (1702), a 32-gun fifth rate launched in 1702. Rebuilt in 1733 as a 20-gun sixth rate, launched in 1734 and scrapped in 1755
- HMS Tartar (1756), a 28-gun sixth rate launched in 1756 and wrecked in 1797
- HMS Tartar (1801), a 32-gun fifth rate launched in 1801 and wrecked in 1811
- HMS Tartar (1814), a 36-gun fifth rate launched in 1814, reduced to receiving ship service in 1830, and scrapped in 1859
- HMS Tartar (1854), ordered as the Russian screw corvette Wojn from a shipyard on the Thames, but seized by Britain while under construction, launched in 1854 and scrapped in 1866
- HMS Tartar (1886), a torpedo cruiser launched in 1886 and sold in 1906
- HMS Tartar (1907), a destroyer launched in 1907 and sold in 1921
- HMS Tartar (F43), a destroyer launched in 1937 and sold in 1948
- HMS Tartar (F133), a frigate launched in 1960 and sold to Indonesia in 1984

== Also ==
- HM Hired armed cutter Tartar
- HM Customs and excise cutter Tartar
- Tartar, a privateer the French vessel Andromaque sank on 15 May 1779
- Tartar, tender to HMS Allegiance in 1782
- HMS Tartar's Prize
- HMS Tartan
