= Thomas Baillie (Royal Navy officer) =

British naval officer (c. 1725–1802)

Captain Thomas Baillie
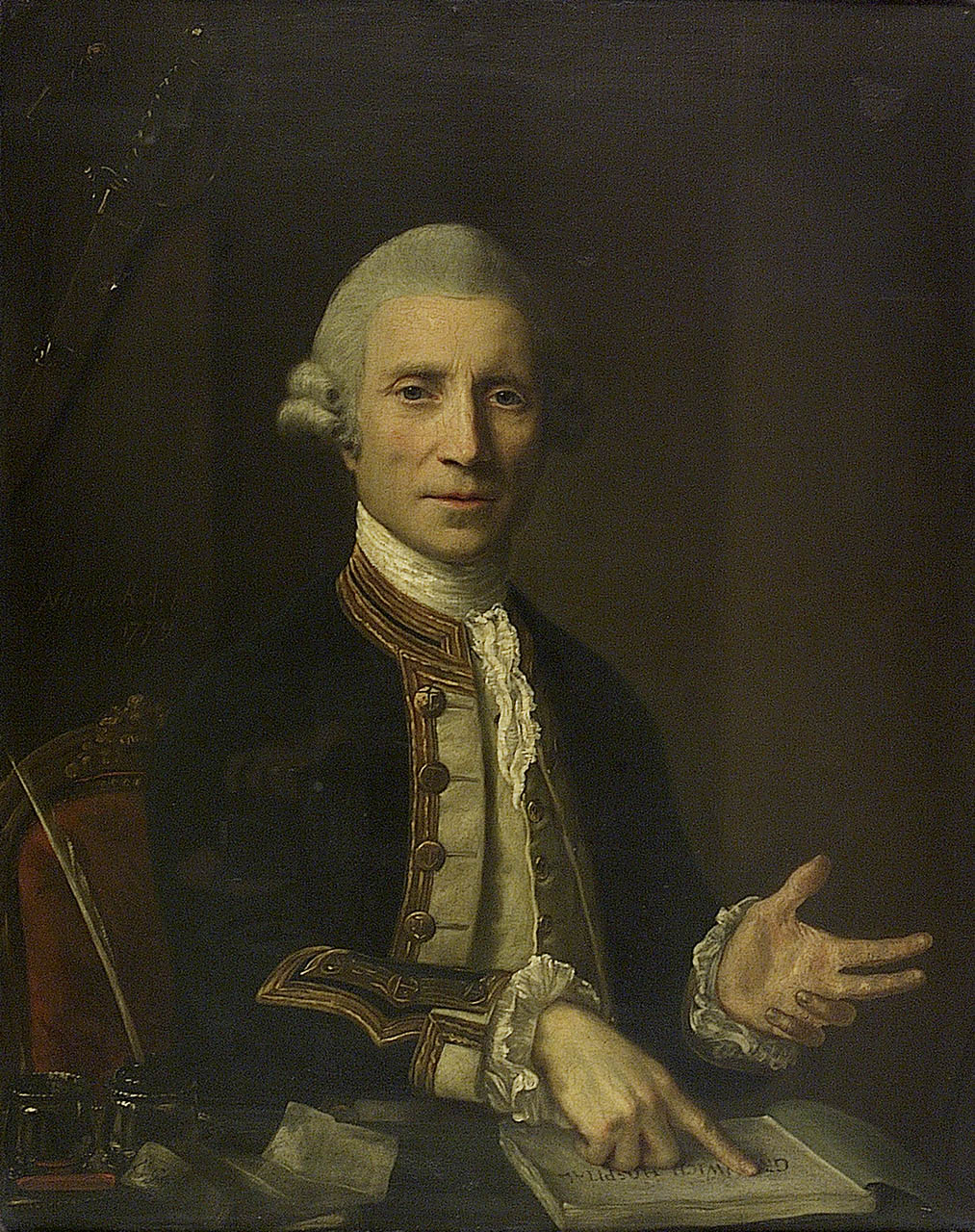
- Captain Thomas Baillie, by Nathaniel Hone the Elder, 1779
- Born: c.1725
- Died: 15 December 1802
- Military career
- Allegiance: United Kingdom
- Branch: Royal Navy
- Service years: c.1740 – 1802
- Rank: Post captain
- Commands: HMS Alderney; HMS Tartar; HMS Tartar's Prize
- Conflicts: Seven Years' War; Battle of Minorca

Thomas Baillie (c.1725 – 15 December 1802) was a Royal Navy officer. He saw service in the Seven Years' War, rising to the rank of captain. He was later appointed to the office of Lieutenant-Governor of Greenwich Hospital, but became involved in the celebrated libel case R v Baillie after he made accusations of mismanagement in the running of the hospital. He was later appointed to the post of Clerk of the Deliveries of the Ordnance, which he held until his death in 1802.

== Early career ==
Baillie was the son of Robert Baillie, Celbridge, Co. Kildare, Ireland. One of his brothers was Captain William Baillie; another, Robert, became archdeacon of Cashel.

Baillie entered the navy about 1740, and was made lieutenant on 29 March 1745. In 1756 he was serving on board the 60-gun HMS Deptford, and was present at the action near Minorca on 20 May. He was shortly afterwards promoted to the command of the 12-gun sloop HMS Alderney, and early in the following year, whilst acting captain of the 28-gun HMS Tartar, captured a French privateer of 24 guns and 240 men, which was purchased into the service as HMS Tartar's Prize. Baillie was promoted to post captain and appointed to command her on 30 March 1757. In this ship he continued, engaged for the most part in convoy service, till she was lost in 1760; and in the following year, 1761, he was appointed to Greenwich Hospital, through the interest, it is said, of the Earl of Bute; he certainly had no claim to the benefits of the hospital by either age, or service, or wounds.

== Greenwich Hospital and trial ==
In 1774 he was advanced to be lieutenant-governor of the hospital, and in March 1778 published a work of 116 pages in quarto, the best account of which is its title. It runs; "The Case of the Royal Hospital for Seamen at Greenwich, containing a comprehensive view of the internal government, in which are stated the several abuses that have been introduced into that great national establishment, wherein landsmen have been appointed to offices contrary to charter; the ample revenues wasted in useless works, and money obtained by petition to parliament to make good deficiencies; the wards torn down and converted into elegant apartments for clerks and their deputies; the pensioners fed with bull-beef and sour small-beer mixed with water, and the contractors, after having been convicted of the most enormous frauds, suffered to compound their penalties and renew their contract".

Baillie provided proof for his accusations, and though he had not put his name on the title-page, he made no attempt to conceal it. The book both directly and indirectly called in question the conduct of Lord Sandwich who at once deprived him of his office, and prompted the inferior officials of the hospital to bring an action for libel against him. The trial which followed, R v Baillie, in November 1778, is principally noticeable for the speech with which his lawyer Thomas Erskine, afterwards Lord Chancellor, but then just called to the bar, wound up the defence, and cleared Baillie of the charge. From the purely naval point of view, however, Baillie was ruined; he was acquitted of all legal blame; but Lord Sandwich had deprived him of his post, and refused to reinstate him, or to appoint him to a ship for active service. The question was raised in the House of Lords; but the interest of the ministry was sufficient to decide it against Captain Baillie, who during the next three years made several fruitless applications both to the Secretary to the Admiralty and to Lord Sandwich himself. His lordship had publicly declared that he knew nothing against Captain Baillie's character as a sea-officer, and also that he did not feel disposed to act vindictively against him; but Baillie's claims were, nevertheless, persistently ignored, and he was left unemployed under the current administration.

== Later years ==
On the change of ministry in 1782, the Duke of Richmond, who became Master-General of the Ordnance, appointed Baillie to the lucrative office of clerk of the deliveries.

A legacy of £500 which fell to him two years later served rather to mark the current of public feeling in the city. Mr. John Barnard, son of former Lord Mayor of London Sir John Barnard, had left him this "as a small token of my approbation of his worthy and disinterested, though ineffectual, endeavours to rescue that noble national charity [sc. Greenwich Hospital] from the rapacious hands of the basest and most wicked of mankind". Captain Baillie spent his old age in the quiet enjoyment of his office under the Ordnance, which he held until his death, on 15 December 1802.

== Notes ==
Political offices
| Preceded by John Kenrick | Clerk of the Deliveries of the Ordnance; 1784–1802 | Succeeded by Joseph Hunt |
