= HMS Diligence (1756) =

Sloop of the Royal Navy

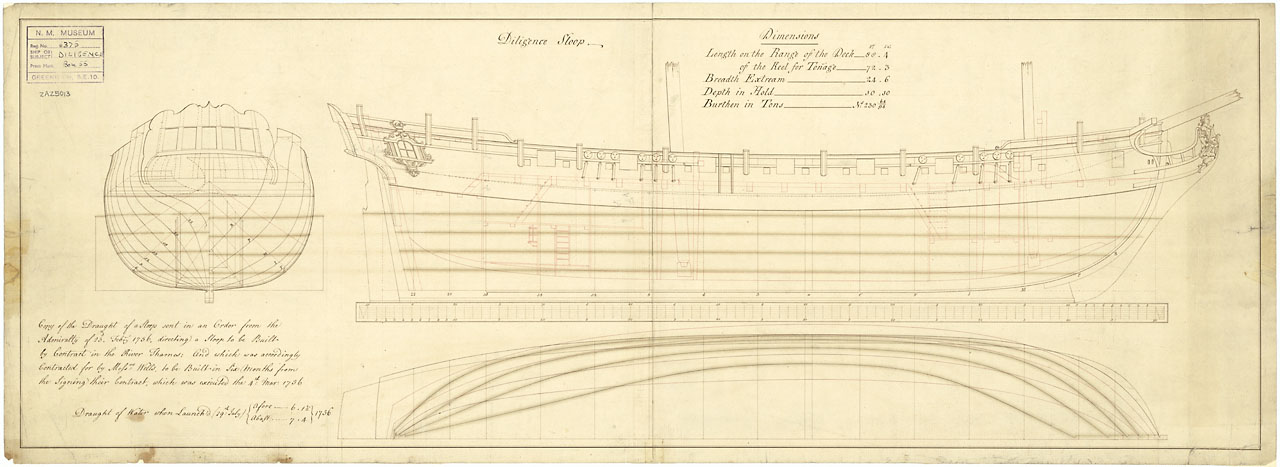
- Diligence

History

Great Britain
- Name: HMS Diligence
- Ordered: 23 February 1756
- Builder: William Wells & Company, Deptford
- Laid down: 18 March 1756
- Launched: 29 July 1756
- Completed: 26 September 1756 at Deptford Dockyard
- Commissioned: August 1756
- In service: 1756–1780
- Renamed: HMS Comet from 27 August 1779
- Fate: Sold out of service, Sheerness Dockyard, 1780

General characteristics
- Class & type: 10-gun Alderney-class sloop
- Tons burthen: 236 46/94 bm
- Length: 88 ft 6 in (27.0 m) (gundeck); 73 ft 1 in (22.3 m) (keel)
- Beam: 24 ft 8 in (7.5 m)
- Draught: 6 ft 1.5 in (1.9 m)
- Depth of hold: 10 ft 10 in (3.3 m)
- Sail plan: ship rig
- Complement: 100 personnel, comprising; 2 commissioned officers; 9 warrant officers; 15 petty officers; 55 naval ratings; 19 servants and other ranks
- Armament: 10 × 4-pdrs; 12 × 1/2-pdr swivel guns

HMS Diligence was a 10-gun Alderney-class sloop of the Royal Navy which saw active service during the Seven Years' War and the American Revolutionary War. Launched in 1756, she was a successful privateer hunter off the coast of France before being reassigned to North American waters in 1763. Fifteen years later she was briefly refitted as a receiving ship for press ganged sailors brought into Sheerness Dockyard, before being re-registered in August 1779 as the fireship Comet.

In December 1780 she was sold into private hands at Sheerness Dockyard for £300.

== Construction ==
Diligence was one of three vessels built to a 1755 design by Surveyor of the Navy William Bately, and collectively known as Alderney-class sloops in recognition of HMS Alderney which was the first to be formally contracted for construction. This was Bately's first experience with vessel design, for which he substantially borrowed from the shape and dimensions of George II's yacht HMY Royal Caroline, built in 1750 by Master Shipwright John Hollond. Bately then added to Hollond's hull design by lengthening the "fore-rake" – the area of the bow that extended beyond the keel – in order to improve the sloop's stability in heavy swell.

Admiralty Orders of 14 November 1755 indicated that the Alderney-class vessels were to be built at private dockyards, leaving the Royal Dockyards fully engaged in constructing or fitting-out the larger ships of the line. For previous Navy contracts the prices quoted by Thames River shipyards had proved exorbitant, and the Navy Board had evidence that the shipwrights were colluding to fix higher rates for construction work. In consequence only regional shipwrights were invited to bid for Diligence, with the contract awarded on 27 February 1756 to William Wells and Company, a private shipyard in Deptford. Contract terms stipulated that the vessel be completed within six months.

The new vessel's keel was laid in March 1756 and work commenced on the hull. Bately's initial design was for a two-masted snow-rigged sloop, but Diligence was the only one completed to this specification; her sister ships Alderney and Stork were modified in mid-1756 into a traditional three-masted ship rig to increase speed at the expense of manoeuvrability. When completed, Diligence was 88 ft 6 in (27.0 m) long with a 73 ft 1 in (22.3 m) keel, a beam of 24 ft 8 in (7.5 m) and a 10 ft 10 in (3.3 m) hold. As fitted out for Royal Navy service she was lightly armed with 10 four-pounder cannons ranged along her upper deck, accompanied by 12 1/2-pounder swivel guns for anti-personnel use.

The half-built sloop was formally christened Diligence on 25 May 1756 and was launched in July 1756, well within the contracted deadline of six months. After launch, she was sailed to Deptford Dockyard for fitting out and to take on guns and crew.

== Service ==
American Revolutionary War: During the Summer of 1776, under command of Thomas Davey, she made 8 captures on the Mississippi River or in the vicinity of it. On unknown dates, probably in 1777, under command of Tho. Davie, she captured sloops Dick Cole, Dolphin, and Horn Snake. She captured brig St. Louis on an unknown date. On 10 January, 1778 she captured American merchant ship "Minerva" 5 leagues off Great Inagua Island, Bahamas. On 5 February, 1778 captured sloop "Brothers", prize arrived at Port Royal, Jamaica on the 5th. On 6 April 1778, she was credited, along with HMS Antilope, for capturing American schooner "John".
