= List of ship launches in 1699 =

The list of ship launches in 1699 includes a chronological list of some ships launched in 1699.

Date	Ship	Class	Builder	Location	Country	Notes
4 April	Revenge	Third rate	Samuel Miller	Deptford Dockyard	England	For Royal Navy.
April	Suffolk	Third rate	Henry Johnson	Blackwall Yard	England	For Royal Navy.
May	Baraban	Sixth rate	S Sereysen	Voronezh	Russia	For Imperial Russian Navy.
May	Bezboiazn	Sixth rate	Y Borvut	Khoper	Russia	For Imperial Russian Navy.
May	Edinorog	Sixth rate	Y Kornilisen	Voronezh	Russia	For Imperial Russian Navy.
May	Gerkules	Sixth rate	P Goor	Chertovitskaya	Russia	For Imperial Russian Navy.
May	Grom	Bomb vessel	A Meyer	Chizhovskaya	Russia	For Imperial Russian Navy.
May	Gromovaia Strela	Bomb vessel	A Meyer	Chizhovskaya	Russia	For Imperial Russian Navy.
May	Krepost	Skorpion-class ship of the line		Panshin	Russia	For Imperial Russian Navy.
May	Lev	Sixth rate	K Kok	Voronezh	Russia	For Imperial Russian Navy.
May	Liliia	Sixth rate	P Nekor	Voronezh	Russia	For Imperial Russian Navy.
May	Molniia	Bomb vessel	A Meyer	Chizhovskaya	Russia	For Imperial Russian Navy.
May	No. 1	Storeship	Y Yansen	Voronezh	Russia	For Imperial Russian Navy.
May	No. 2	Storeship	P Goor	Voronezh	Russia	For Imperial Russian Navy.
May	No. 3	Storeship	P Goor	Voronezh	Russia	For Imperial Russian Navy.
May	No. 4	Storeship	P Goor	Voronezh	Russia	For Imperial Russian Navy.
May	No. 5	Storeship	Y Martisen	Voronezh	Russia	For Imperial Russian Navy.
May	Stul	Sixth rate	K Bokar	Voronezh	Russia	For Imperial Russian Navy.
May	Tri Ruimki	Sixth rate	S Peterson	Voronezh	Russia	For Imperial Russian Navy.
May	Vesy	Storeship	D Feykes	Voronezh	Russia	For Imperial Russian Navy.
2 August	Nassau	Third rate	Waffe	Portsmouth Dockyard	England	For Royal Navy.
August	Aurengzebe	East Indiaman	John Frame	Rotherhithe	England	For British East India Company.
August	Hasardeux	Fourth rate	Pierre Coulomb	Lorient	Kingdom of France	For French Navy.
3 September	Tilbury	Fourth rate	Daniel Furzer	Chatham Dockyard	England	For Royal Navy.
31 October	Oriflamme	Third rate	Laurent Coulomb	Toulon	Kingdom of France	For French Navy.
December	Frederik IV	First rate	O Judichaer	Copenhagen	Denmark	For Dano-Norwegian Navy.
Unknown date	Agnets	Bomb vessel	Y Moro	Voronezh	Russia	For Imperial Russian Navy.
Unknown date	Arfa	Fifth rate	Y Terpliy	Stupino	Russia	For Imperial Russian Navy.
Unknown date	Batavia	Fourth rate	Hendrik Cardinaal	Amsterdam	Dutch Republic	For Dutch Navy.
Unknown date	Blagoe Nachalo	Sixth rate	Y Borvut	Khoper	Russia	For Imperial Russian Navy.
Unknown date	Bomba	Bomb vessel	Y Moro	Voronezh	Russia	For Imperial Russian Navy.
Unknown date	Bonetta	Bonetta-class sloop	Samuel Miller	Deptford Dockyard	England	For Royal Navy.
Unknown date	Delft	Fourth rate		Rotterdam	Dutch Republic	For Dutch Navy.
Unknown date	Drumkrakht	Fourth rate	Y Tendorov	Stupino	Russia	For Imperial Russian Navy.
Unknown date	Flag	Skorpion-class ship of the line	I Thomas	Panshin	Russia	For Imperial Russian Navy.
Unknown date	Fox	Bonetta-class sloop	Robert Lee	Sheerness Dockyard	England	For Royal Navy.
Unknown date	Gelderland	Third rate	Van Leeuwen	Rotterdam	Dutch Republic	For Dutch Navy.
Unknown date	Graaf van Albemarle	Third rate			Dutch Republic	For Dutch Navy.
Unknown date	Granat Apol	Fifth rate	Y Terpliy	Stupino	Russia	For Imperial Russian Navy.
Unknown date	Kamen	Fourth rate	Y Kornilisen	Stupino	Russia	For Imperial Russian Navy.
Unknown date	Kampen	Fourth rate	Hendrik Cardinaal	Amsterdam	Dutch Republic	For Dutch Navy.
Unknown date	Merkurii	Sixth rate		Voronezh	Russia	For Imperial Russian Navy.
Unknown date	Merlin	Bonetta-class sloop	Robert Shortis	Chatham Dockyard	England	For Royal Navy.
Unknown date	Middelburg	Second rate	Adriaen Davidsen	Vlissingen	Dutch Republic	For Dutch Navy.
Unknown date	Mirotvorest	Bomb vessel	A Meyer	Chizhovskaya	Russia	For Imperial Russian Navy.
Unknown date	Otvoryonnoye Vrata	Sixth rate		Voronezh	Russia	For Imperial Russian Navy.
Unknown date	Perinaia Tiagota	Galley			Russia	For Imperial Russian Navy.
Unknown date	Prinses Amelia	Third rate	Hendrik Cardinaal	Amsterdam	Dutch Republic	For Dutch Navy.
Unknown date	Prohibition	Bonetta-class sloop	Fisher Harding	Woolwich Dockyard	England	For Royal Navy.
Unknown date	Raadhuis van Haarlem	Fourth rate	Hendrik Cardinaal	Amsterdam	Dutch Republic	For Dutch Navy.
Unknown date	Revenge	Third rate	Miller	Deptford Dockyard	England	For Royal Navy.
Unknown date	Rys	Fourth rate	E Debrony	Stupino	Russia	For Imperial Russian Navy.
Unknown date	San Joaquín	Third rate		Orio	Spain	For Spanish Navy.
Unknown date	Schieland	Fourth rate	Van Leeuwen	Rotterdam	Dutch Republic	For Dutch Navy.
Unknown date	Shark	Bonetta-class sloop	Samuel Miller	Deptford Dockyard	England	For Royal Navy.
Unknown date	Sila	Sixth rate		Voronezh	Russia	For Imperial Russian Navy.
Unknown date	Skorpion	Skorpion-class ship of the line		Panshin	Russia	For Imperial Russian Navy.
Unknown date	Slon	Fourth rate	P Kornilisen	Stupino	Russia	For Imperial Russian Navy.
Unknown date	Sobaka	Fourth rate	P Kornilisen	Stupino	Russia	For Imperial Russian Navy.
Unknown date	Soedinenie	Sixth rate	Y Borvut	Khoper	Russia	For Imperial Russian Navy.
Unknown date	Sokol	Fourth rate	I Detoniko	Stupino	Russia	For Imperial Russian Navy.
Unknown date	Stirling Castle	Third rate	Benjamin Rosewell	Deptford Dockyard	England	For Royal Navy.
Unknown date	Strakh	Bomb vessel	Y Moro	Voronezh	Russia	For Imperial Russian Navy.
Unknown date	Strus	Fourth rate	Y Kornilisen	Stupino	Russia	For Imperial Russian Navy.
Unknown date	Swallow	Bonetta-class sloop	Robert Shortis	Chatham Dockyard	England	For Royal Navy.
Unknown date	Swift	Bonetta-class sloop	Elias Waffe	Portsmouth Dockyard	England	For Royal Navy.
Unknown date	Tsvet Voiny	Sixth rate		Voronezh	Russia	For Imperial Russian Navy.
Unknown date	Veter	Galley			Russia	For Imperial Russian Navy.
Unknown date	Wolf	Bonetta-class sloop	Elias Waffe	Portsmouth Dockyard	England	For Royal Navy.
Unknown date	Zeelandia	Second rate		Amsterdam	Dutch Republic	For Dutch Navy.
Unknown date	Zhuravl Steregushchi	Fourth rate	P Kornilisen	Stupino	Russia	For Imperial Russian Navy.
Unknown date	Zaiachii Beg	Galley			Russia	For Imperial Russian Navy.
Unknown date	Zolotoi Oryol	Galley			Russia	For Imperial Russian Navy.
Unknown date	Zvedza	Skorpion-class ship of the line	I Thomas	Panshin	Russia	For Imperial Russian Navy.
