= HMS Lowestoffe (1756) =

Lowestoffe-class Royal Navy frigate

- Lowestoff

History

Great Britain
- Name: HMS Lowestoffe
- Operator: Royal Navy
- Ordered: 20 May 1755
- Builder: John Greaves, Limehouse
- Laid down: June 1755
- Launched: 17 May 1756
- Completed: 8 June 1756 at Deptford Dockyard
- Commissioned: May 1756
- Fate: Wrecked 19 May 1760

General characteristics
- Class & type: Lowestoffe-class sixth-rate frigate
- Tons burthen: 594 33/94 (bm)
- Length: 118 ft 3 in (36 m) (gundeck); 97 ft 7 3/8 in (29.8 m) (keel)
- Beam: 33 ft 10 in (10.3 m)
- Depth of hold: 10 ft 4 in (3.1 m)
- Sail plan: Full-rigged ship
- Complement: 200 officers and men
- Armament: Upperdeck: 24 × 9-pounder guns; Quarterdeck: 4 × 3-pounder guns; 12 × swivel guns

HMS Lowestoffe was a 28-gun Lowestoffe-class sixth-rate frigate of the Royal Navy. Named after the UK's most easterly port of Lowestoft in Suffolk the ship was designed by Sir Thomas Slade based on the earlier Lyme of 1748, "with such alterations as may tend to the better stowing of men and carrying for guns." The design provided for a 24-gun ship (from 22 September 1756 this was raised to 28 guns by including the 3 pounders on the quarterdeck in the count) of 583 tons, but on completion the ship measured some 11 tons more.

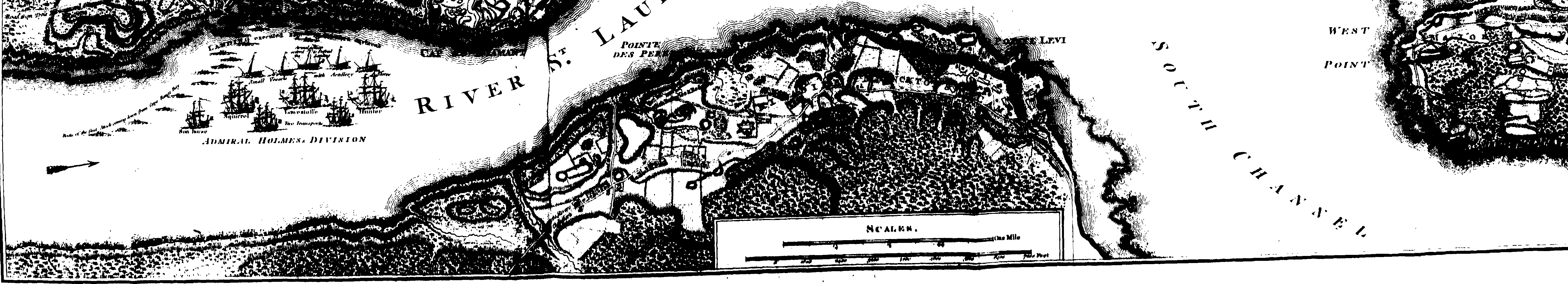
Lowestoffe in the Saint Lawrence River, 1759

The ship served in the British operations to relieve Quebec during the Seven Years' War before being wrecked off Pointe-aux-Trembles on 19 May 1760.
