= R v Baillie =

1778 British libel trial

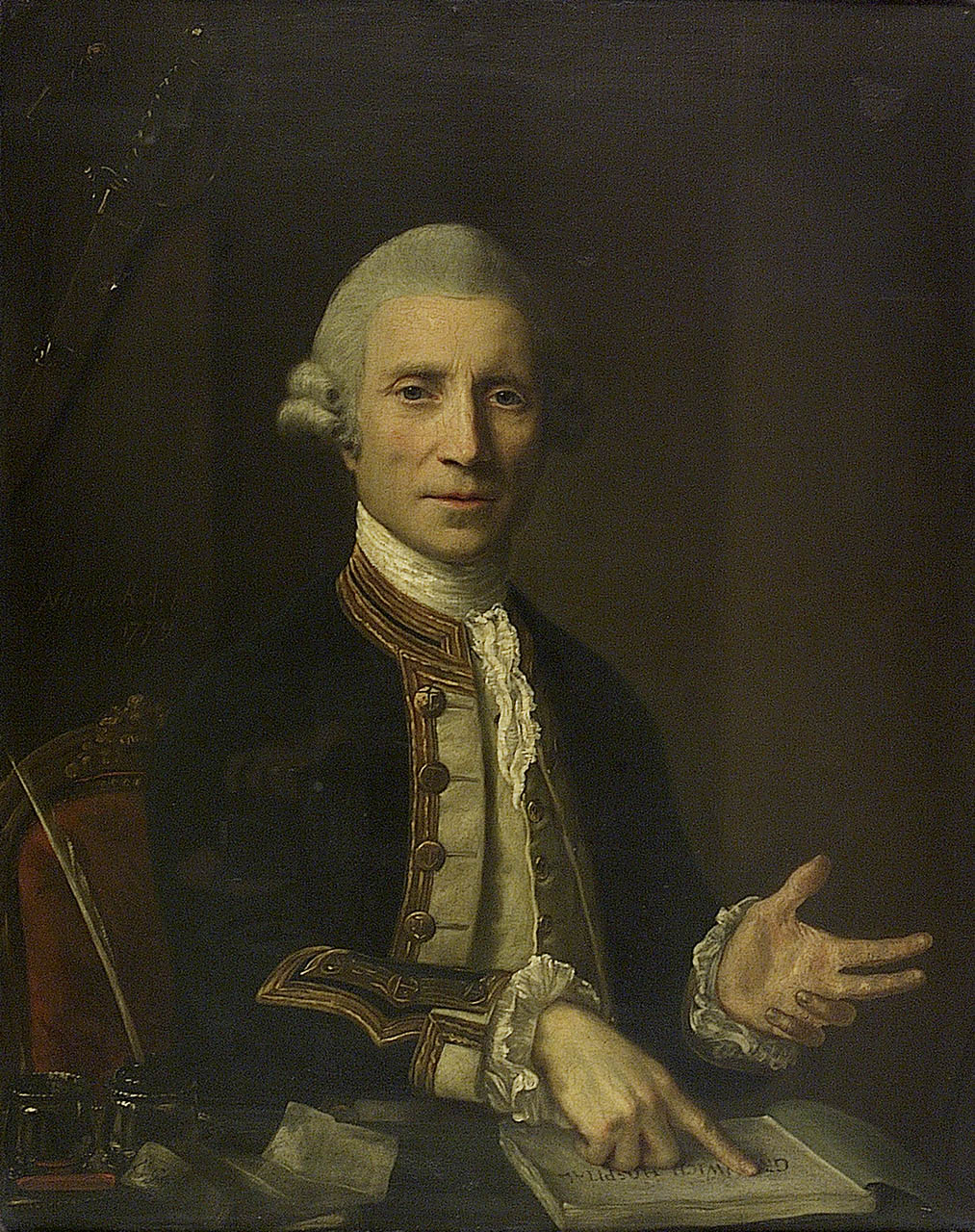
Captain Thomas Baillie, the subject of R v Baillie

R v Baillie, also known as the Greenwich Hospital Case, was a 1778 prosecution of Thomas Baillie for criminal libel. The case initiated the legal career of Thomas Erskine. Baillie, the Lieutenant-Governor of the Greenwich Hospital for Seamen, a facility for injured or pensioned off seamen, had noted irregularities and corruption in the hospital, which was formally run by the Earl of Sandwich. After his official reporting of the problems failed to bring about reform in the hospital, Baillie published a pamphlet that was critical of the hospital's officers, alleging that Sandwich had given appointments to pay off political debts; Sandwich ignored the pamphlet but ensured that Baillie was indicted for criminal libel. Baillie hired five barristers, including Erskine, then newly called to the Bar, and appeared before Lord Mansfield in the Court of King's Bench on 23 November 1778.

After four of the barristers had spoken, Mansfield announced that the court session would resume the next morning rather than continue into the night, which gave Erskine the time he needed to present a full speech rather than a brief comment. In it he accused Sandwich of cowardice and of orchestrating the attack on Baillie, arguing that Baillie was merely doing his duty by attempting to bring the problems with the hospital into the public eye, and was therefore not acting in bad faith. If the issues with the hospital were not acknowledged, Erskine claimed, the Royal Navy would be "crippled by abuses", with seamen no longer willing to risk their lives for a fleet that would fail to treat them well in their retirement. Erskine was successful in having Baillie found not guilty, and after leaving the court was met with a standing ovation; Emory Speer writes that "It is probably true that never did a single speech so completely ensure professional success".

== Background ==
From 1705 to 1865, the Greenwich Hospital for Seamen provided medical care to injured seamen and lodgings for those injured sailors who had been pensioned off or were unable to work on ships. Directed by an admiral, "it was more like a ship in port than a clinical facility ... its residents all wore navy uniforms; food was identical to that served on vessels (a weekly four pounds of meat and gallon of beer); the seamen received a full ration of tobacco each week; and time was told by the number of bells". The facility was established by Royal Charter and led by a group of commissioners. Captain Thomas Baillie was a respected sailor who, after retirement, had been appointed Lieutenant-Governor of the hospital. Here he found corruption, in breach of the hospital's Royal Charter, and endeavoured to bring it to the attention of the directors hospital, the hospital's governors, and eventually the Lords Commissioners of the Admiralty.

After failing to receive any satisfactory response from those in power over the hospital, Baillie published a pamphlet in 1778 detailing the problems and corruption, which had gone so far as to include denying food to the sailors. The publication of the pamphlet reflected badly on the Earl of Sandwich, who was at the time First Lord of the Admiralty. In his efforts to gain votes and pay off political debts Sandwich had given many of the positions in the hospital to his cronies, who had never served as sailors. Although he publicly ignored Baillie's allegations, Sandwich ensured through back channels that he was suspended from his job, and had associates go to the Court of King's Bench and secure a writ allowing them to sue him for criminal libel.

By chance, Baillie happened to have dinner with a friend of Thomas Erskine, a newly qualified barrister and former seaman with the Royal Navy. Erskine himself also attended the dinner, although Baillie and Erskine were then unacquainted. When Erskine, unaware of Baillie's presence, "launched into an eloquent tirade against the corrupt and tyrannical practises of Sandwich", Baillie resolved to have him as counsel in the case. The next morning, Erskine received the brief for R v Baillie and a retainer of one guinea. Initially thinking he was the only barrister Baillie had retained, he was disappointed to find out that he was but one of five, the other four being Edward Bearcroft, Harry Peckham, Murphy and Hargrave, and that he was scheduled to speak last.

== Trial ==
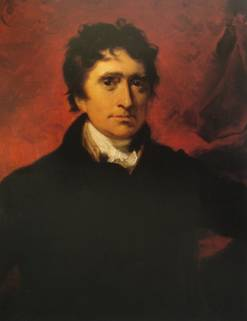
Thomas Erskine, whose impassioned speech won the acquittal of Baille.

The case of R v Baillie, a prosecution for criminal libel, opened on 23 November 1778 at 1 pm before Lord Mansfield, the Lord Chief Justice, in the Court of King's Bench. Prior to this, Baillie and his counsel had been debating how to respond to the case; Bearcroft, Peckham, Murphy and Hargrave advocated negotiating a settlement before it went to trial, while Erskine urged them to argue Baillie's case before the court and eventually succeeded in convincing Baillie that this was the right thing to do. The case opened with an address by Sir John Scott, the Solicitor General for England and Wales, who was prosecuting Baillie, followed by "long, dreary" speeches by Bearcroft, Peckham, Murphy and Hargrave, defending him. An illness that befell Hargrave caused several interruptions to the proceedings, and as a result darkness had fallen by the time he finished speaking. Lord Mansfield announced that rather than dragging the proceedings out late into the night, the court session would end for the evening and resume the next morning, when Erskine would have his chance to speak. Erskine recognised this as a great opportunity, as it would present him with a refreshed court the following day, rather than an exhausted one; he said later that he "always blessed God for the providential [illness] of Hargrave".

Returning the next morning, the counsel found a packed court; owing to the involvement of Lord Sandwich and other significant political figures, the case had received a substantial amount of publicity, and thus an audience. Erskine, who without the interruptions would merely have made a short statement and "remained in obscurity", had taken the adjournment as an opportunity to write a full speech. In it Erskine argued that Baillie, unlike others charged with libel, had merely been doing his duty; he "was not a disappointed malicious informer, prying into official abuses ... not troublesomely inquisitive into other men's departments, but conscientiously correcting his own at the risk of his office". After Mansfield cautioned him for growing heated on the subject of Sandwich, who was not before the court, Erskine replied by stating that Sandwich had "placed [the plaintiffs] in the front of the battle, in hopes to escape under their shelter ... I will drag him to light, who is the dark mover behind this scene of iniquity".

Erskine then argued that if Sandwich was not responsible for the actions of the hospital's officers, he should respond by denying responsibility for them and restoring Baillie to his office; if he did not, he would be "a shameless oppressor, a disgrace to his rank, and a traitor to his trust". Were the situation in the hospital allowed to continue, the Royal Navy would be "crippled by abuses", with seamen no longer willing to risk their lives for a fleet that would fail to reward them with good treatment in retirement. Baillie, who had merely tried to prevent this from happening, deserved "a palace, instead of a prison"; Erskine then left Baillie in the hands of the judges, and the case was dismissed with costs.

== Aftermath ==
The reaction to the trial and to Erskine's speech was tremendous; upon leaving the court he was given a standing ovation by the attorneys present, many of whom offered him briefs on the spot. Joseph Jekyll reported that the court was "in a trance of amazement", and Emory Speer wrote that "It is probably true that never did a single speech so completely insure professional success". Erskine claimed to have received 65 briefs immediately after the trial as a result of the case, which may be an exaggeration, although he undoubtedly did well out of his victory. He became Lord Chancellor in the Ministry of All the Talents and was renowned as an excellent, albeit unorthodox, advocate. Sandwich remained in office until the government fell in 1792; Baillie, on the other hand, was not reinstated at the Hospital despite an insistent effort to regain his former position. The events of the trial were replicated in an episode of Garrow's Law, with William Garrow depicted as representing Baillie (rather than Erskine) and his main antagonist, Arthur Hill, replacing Lord Sandwich.

== Bibliography ==
- Briesen, Fritz V. (1902). "Thomas Erskine and his First Case". Brief. 4 (1). ISSN 0273-0995.
- Burr, Stiles W. (1932). "Erskine – Type of the Independent Lawyer". American Bar Association Journal. 18 (1). American Bar Association. ISSN 0002-7596.
- High, J.L. (1870). "Lord Erskine". Bench and Bar. 2 (1). ISSN 0164-9345.
- Hostettler, John (2010). Thomas Erskine and Trial by Jury (2nd ed.). Waterside Press. ISBN 978-190-438-0.
- Lovat-Fraser, J.A. (1907). "Lord Chancellor Erskine". Juridical Review. 18 (1). ISSN 0022-6785.
- Speer, Emory (1908). "The Forensic Eloquence of Thomas Lord Erskine". Green Bag. 20 (12). ISSN 1095-5216.
- Townsend, William C. (1839). "Life of Lord Erskine". Quarterly Review of Jurisprudence. 22 (1). Saunders and Benning.
