= Hunter-class sloop =

Class overview
- Operators: Royal Navy
- Preceded by: Bonetta class
- Succeeded by: Alderney class
- Built: 1755-1756
- In commission: 1756-1780
- Completed: 2
- Lost: 1

General characteristics (common design)
- Type: Sloop-of-war
- Tons burthen: 223 62/94 bm
- Length: 88 ft 3 in (26.9 m) (gundeck); 73 ft 0 in (22.3 m) (keel)
- Beam: 24 ft 3 in (7.4 m)
- Depth of hold: 7 ft 0 in (2.13 m)
- Sail plan: Snow rig
- Complement: 100
- Armament: 10 × short 6-pounder guns; also 12 x ½-pounder swivel guns

The Hunter class was a class of two sloops of wooden construction built for the Royal Navy in 1755 and 1756. Both were built by contract with commercial builders to a common design prepared by Thomas Slade, the Surveyor of the Navy.

Both were ordered on 5 August 1755, and contracts with the builders were agreed on 8 August. They were two-masted (snow-rigged) vessels, although the Hunter was built with a 'pink' or very narrow stern (and a keel 3 feet longer than the original design), while her sister Viper had a traditional 'square' stern.

Hunter was captured by two American privateers off Boston on 23 November 1775, but was retaken by HMS Greyhound the following day.

== Vessels ==
Name	Ordered	Builder	Launched	Notes
Hunter	5 August 1755	Thomas Stanton and William Wells, Rotherhithe	28 February 1756	Sold by auction at New York City on 27 December 1780.
Viper	5 August 1755	Thomas West, Deptford	31 March 1756	Wrecked 15 December 1779 in the Thames Estuary.
