= Unicorn-class frigate =

Class overview
- Name: Lyme
- Operators: Royal Navy
- Succeeded by: Lowestoffe class
- Built: 1747–1749
- In service: 1749–1771
- Completed: 2
- Lost: 1
- Retired: 1

General characteristics
- Type: 24-gun (later 28-gun) sixth-rate frigate
- Tons burthen: 581 50/94 bm
- Length: 117 ft 10 in (35.9 m) (overall); 96 ft 5.5 in (29.4 m) (keel)
- Beam: 33 ft 8 in (10.3 m)
- Depth of hold: 10 ft 2 in (3.10 m)
- Sail plan: Full-rigged ship
- Complement: 160 (raised to 180 on 22 September 1756, and to 200 on 11 November 1756)
- Armament: 28 guns: Upper gun deck: 24 × 9-pdrs; Quarterdeck: 4 × 3-pdrs (after 22 September 1756) + 12 × 1/2-pdr swivels after 11 November 1756

The Unicorn class were a class of two 24-gun sixth-rate frigates of the Royal Navy. They served during the War of the Austrian Succession and the Seven Years' War.

They were built to the draught of a French privateer named Le Tygre, which had been captured earlier in 1747. They were initially rated as 24-gun ships, in spite of having four 3-pdr guns mounted on the quarterdeck, as well as the twenty-four 9-pdr guns forming their primary battery on the upper deck. However, in 1756 they were re-classed as 28-gun ships. They are normally seen as the first true sailing frigates to be built for the Royal Navy.

== Ships in class ==
- HMS Lyme
  - Ordered: 29 April 1747
  - Builder: Deptford Royal Dockyard
  - Laid Down: 24 September 1747
  - Launched: 10 December 1748
  - Completed: 8 February 1749
  - Fate: Wrecked off the Baltic coast of Sweden on 18 October 1760.
- HMS Unicorn
  - Ordered: 29 April 1747
  - Builder: Plymouth Royal Dockyard
  - Laid down: 3 July 1747
  - Launched: 7 December 1748
  - Completed: 17 July 1749
  - Fate: Broken up at Sheerness Dockyard in December 1771
