= Clerk of the Deliveries of the Ordnance =

Former British Army appointment, responsible for ordnance stores

Office of the Clerk of the Deliveries of the Ordnance
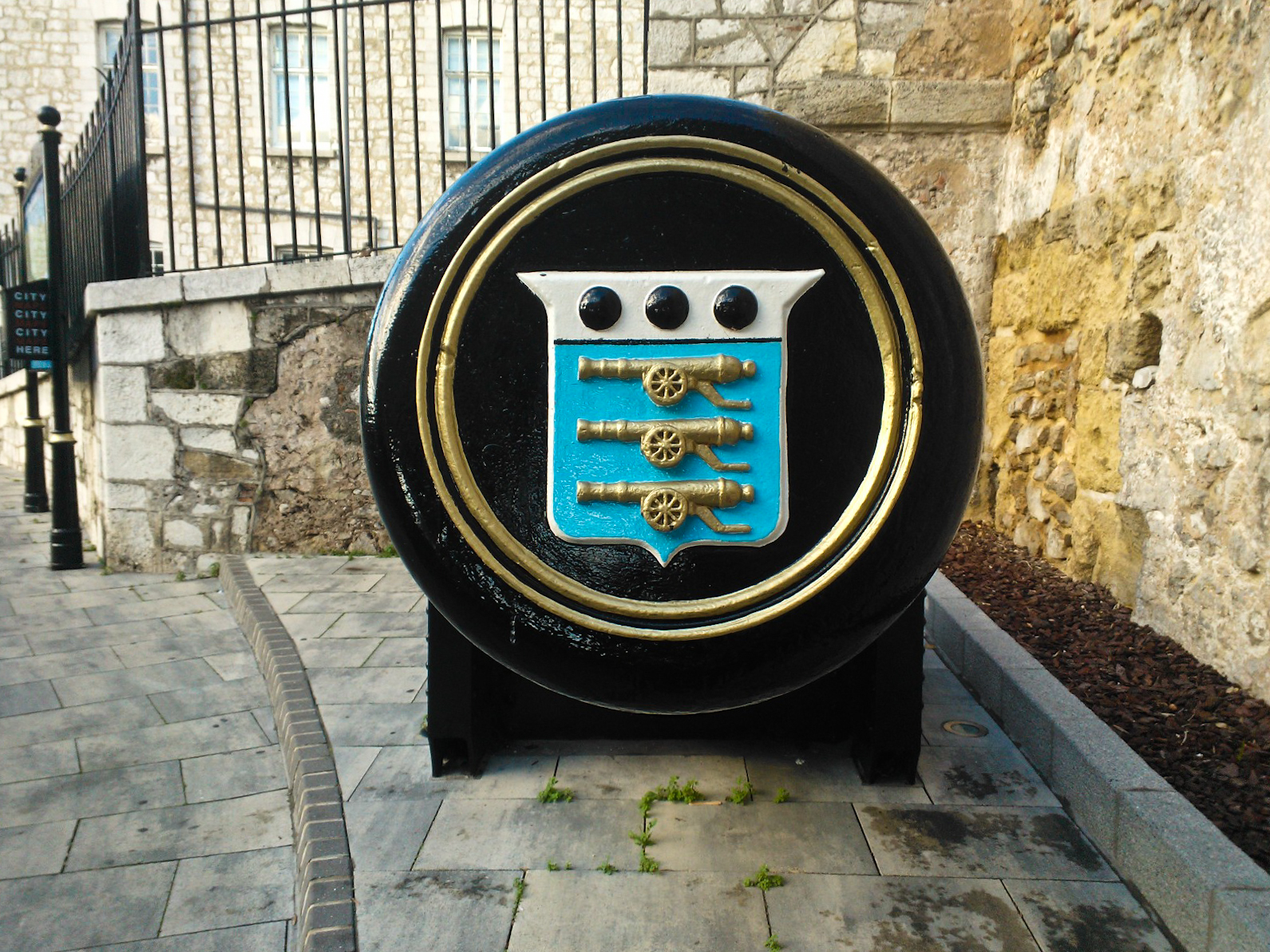
- Board of Ordnance Arms preserved on a gun tampion in Gibraltar
- Member of: Board of Ordnance (1597-1830)
- Reports to: Master-General of the Ordnance
- Appointer: Prime Minister; Subject to formal approval by the King-in-Council
- Term length: Not fixed (typically 3–9 years)
- Inaugural holder: Brian Hogg
- Formation: 1570-1830

The Clerk of the Deliveries of the Ordnance was a subordinate of the Master-General of the Ordnance and a member of the Board of Ordnance from its constitution in 1597. He was responsible for keeping record of the number and kind of stores issued from the stocks of ordnance. The office was abolished in 1830.

== Clerks of the Deliveries of the Ordnance (pre-Restoration) ==
- 28 November 1570: Brian Hogg (d. bef. 1595)
- 18 August 1578: George Hogg (joint)
- 8 May 1595: John Linewray (joint)
- 20 July 1602: Sir Robert Johnson
- 12 December 1604: Robert Johnson junior (d. bef. 1606) (joint)
- 6 May 1618: Edward Johnson and Henry Johnson (joint)
- 17 July 1640 Thomas Eastbrooke and George Clark (joint)

== Clerks of the Deliveries of the Ordnance (Parliamentary) ==
- March 1643: Stephen Darnelly
- December 1644: Thomas Heselrig
- September 1646: William Billers

== Clerks of the Deliveries of the Ordnance (post-Restoration) ==
- 1660 George Clark (restored)
- 15 April 1670: George Wharton
- 25 November 1670: Samuel Fortrey
- 2 February 1682: William Bridges
- 1 August 1683: Thomas Gardiner
- 2 April 1685: Sir William Trumbull
- 2 December 1685: Philip Musgrave
- 27 July 1689: Christopher Musgrave
- 15 May 1696: James Lowther
- 15 February 1701: John Pulteney
- 18 June 1703: James Craggs
- 1 March 1711: Newdigate Ousley
- 30 June 1713: Richard King
- 2 December 1714: James Craggs
- 24 March 1715: Thomas Frankland
- 16 March 1722: Leonard Smelt
- 31 May 1733: William Rawlinson Earle
- 1 May 1741: Andrew Wilkinson
- 23 April 1746: Charles Frederick
- 26 March 1751: Job Staunton Charlton
- 8 July 1758: Sir Charles Cocks, 1st Baronet
- 8 December 1772: Benjamin Langlois
- 20 June 1778: Henry Strachey
- 16 October 1780: John Kenrick
- 1 March 1784: Thomas Baillie
- 17 May 1802: Joseph Hunt
- 10 January 1804: Cropley Ashley
- 12 March 1806: James Martin Lloyd
- 7 April 1807: Cropley Ashley
- 29 July 1807: Thomas Thoroton
- 31 October 1812: Edmund Phipps
