= HMS Tartan =

HMS Tartan has been the name of more than one ship of the British Royal Navy, and may refer to:

- HMS Tartan (1692), an advice boat captured from France in 1692 and lost to recapture by France in 1695
- HMS Tartan (1702), a 32-gun fifth rate launched in 1702, rebuilt as a sixth rate in 1733, and scrapped in 1755

== See also ==
- HMS Tartar
