= Hired armed cutter Tartar =

His Majesty's Hired armed cutter Tartar served the Royal Navy from 14 July 1794 to 11 November 1801. She was of 9063/94 tons (bm) and was armed with twelve 4-pounder guns.

Then in August 1799, the hired armed vessel Tartar participated in the Anglo-Russian invasion of Holland. The expedition was under the command of Admiral Adam Duncan and the Duke of York. Some 250 craft of all sizes transported 17,000 troops from Margate Roads and the Downs across the Channel on 13 August. Due to bad weather it was 21 August before they anchored off Kijkduin. The next day Vice Admiral Mitchell sent a summons to Vice Admiral Samuel Story, calling on him to surrender his fleet. When he declined, the Duke of York landed his army near Den Helder on 27 August under covering fire from the fleet. Den Helder was occupied the following day when the garrison evacuated the town. The expedition then took possession of 13 old warships laid up in ordinary. On 30 August, Mitchel again summoned Story. This time Story agreed to surrender his squadron of 12 modern warships. The Royal Navy purchased 11 of these. The Dutch surrender, without any resistance, became known as the Vlieter Incident. As a result of the surrender, Duncan's fleet was awarded prize money, in which Tartar shared. (Note: An initial distribution of prize money resulted in a payment of 6s 8d to each ordinary seaman.)

== Possibly related vessels ==
Tartar was a popular name for British privateers with some 23 letters of marque being issued between 1793 and 1815, covering what appear to be some eight or so different vessels. Among these there was one 90-ton cutter. She was armed with eight 2-pounder guns and six swivel guns. Her crew of 24 men was under the command of Benjamin Jelly Worthington, and her letter was dated 25 February 1793.

Benjamin Jelly Worthington received a second letter of marque, dated 5 July 1794, for the cutter Tartar, of 100 tons (bm), armed with ten 2-pounder guns and having a crew of 23 men. Whether this vessel became the hired armed cutter or whether Worthington sailed in a different vessel is an open question.

After the outbreak of the Napoleonic Wars, Worthington received a third letter of marque, this one dated 9 June 1803, for the cutter Tartar, of 103 tons bm, armed with eight 6 and 4-pounder guns, and having a crew of 26.

== Notes, citations, and references ==
Notes

Citations

References

- Chatterton, E. Kemble (1912) King's Cutters and Smugglers, 1700–1855. (London:George Allen).
- Winfield, Rif (2008). British Warships in the Age of Sail 1793–1817: Design, Construction, Careers and Fates. Seaforth Publishing. ISBN 978-1-86176-246-7.
