= Lowestoffe-class frigate =

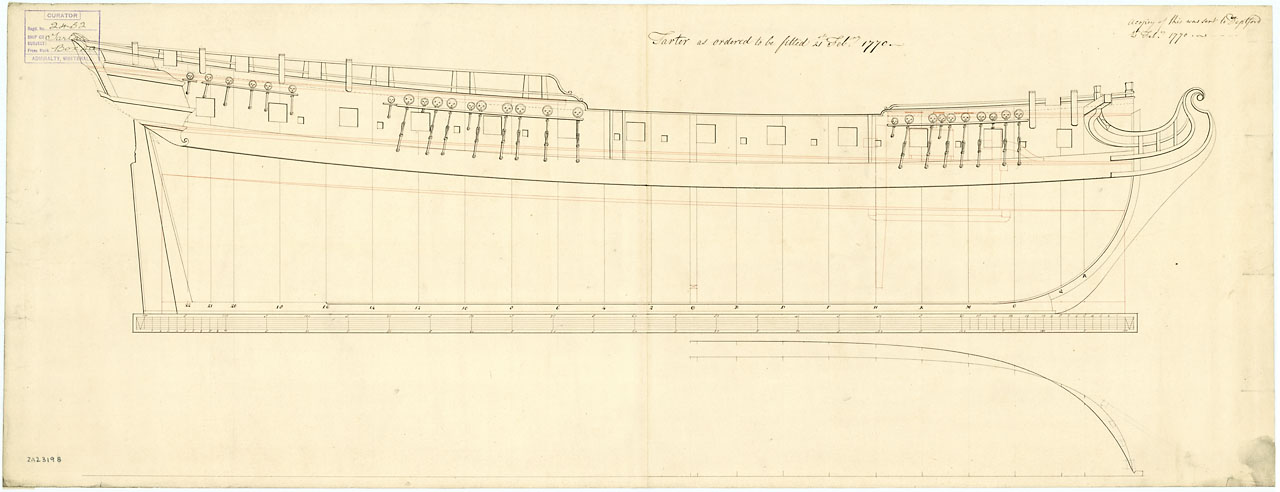
- Tartar (1757)

Class overview
- Name: Lowestoffe-class frigate
- Operators: Royal Navy
- In service: 1756 - 1797
- Completed: 2
- Lost: 2

General characteristics
- Type: 28-gun sixth-rate frigate
- Tons burthen: 583 13/94 bm
- Length: 117 ft 10 in (35.9 m) (overall); 96 ft 8.5 in (29.5 m) (keel)
- Beam: 33 ft 8 in (10.3 m)
- Depth of hold: 10 ft 2 in (3.10 m)
- Sail plan: Full-rigged ship
- Complement: 180 (raised to 200 on 11 November 1756)
- Armament: 28 guns: Upperdeck: 24 × 9-pounder guns; Quarterdeck: 4 × 3-pounder guns (6-pdrs after 1780); + 4 × 18-pounder carronades (after August 1779); Forecastle: 2 × 18-pounder carronades (after 1779); 12 × swivel guns (after 1756)

The Lowestoffe class were a class of two 28-gun sixth-rate frigates of the Royal Navy. They served during the Seven Years' War, with HMS Tartar surviving to see action in the American War of Independence and the French Revolutionary Wars.

They were designed by Sir Thomas Slade, based on the prototype 28-gun frigate Lyme (launched in 1748), "with such alterations as may tend to the better stowing of men and carrying for guns". These alterations involved raising the headroom between decks. They were originally ordered as 24-gun ships with 160 men, but re-rated while under construction to 28 guns with the addition of 3-pounder guns on the quarterdeck and with their complement being raised to 180 men.

== Ships in class ==
- HMS Lowestoffe
  - Ordered: 20 May 1755
  - Builder: John Greaves, Limehouse.
  - Laid Down: June 1755
  - Launched: 17 May 1756
  - Completed: 8 June 1756 at Deptford Dockyard.
  - Fate: Wrecked at Pointe-aux-Trembles, Canada on 19 May 1760.
- HMS Tartar
  - Ordered: 12 June 1755
  - Builder: John Randall, Rotherhithe.
  - Laid Down: 4 July 1755
  - Launched: 3 April 1756
  - Completed: 2 May 1756 at Deptford Dockyard.
  - Fate: Wrecked at Puerto Plata, then burnt there 1 April 1797.
