= HMS Tartar's Prize =

1756 sixth-rate frigate

History

Great Britain
- Name: Tartar's Prize
- Launched: 1756 as French privateer from Le Havre
- Completed: July 1757
- Acquired: 23 March 1757
- Commissioned: March 1757
- In service: 1757–1760
- Honours and awards: Battle of Lagos, 1759
- Fate: Foundered off Sardinia, 2 March 1760

General characteristics
- Class & type: 24-gun sixth-rate
- Tons burthen: 424 65/94 bm
- Length: 117 ft 3 in (35.7 m) (gundeck); 99 ft 5.5 in (30.3 m) (keel)
- Beam: 28 ft 4 in (8.6 m)
- Depth of hold: 13 ft 3 in (4.0 m)
- Complement: 160
- Armament: 20 × 6-pdrs (gundeck); 4 × 9-pdrs (quarterdeck)

HMS Tartar's Prize was a 24-gun sixth-rate of the Royal Navy, which saw active service between 1756 and 1760, during the Seven Years' War.

Originally the French privateer La Marie Victoire, she was captured by HMS Tartar in 1757 and refitted as a privateer hunter. In this role she secured a single victory at sea with the capture of the French vessel La Marquise de Chateaunois. A flimsily built vessel, Tartar's Prize sprang a leak and foundered off the coast of Sardinia in 1760.

== Construction ==
The French privateer La Marie Victoire was constructed at the port of Le Havre in 1756. As built, the vessel was 117 ft 3 in (35.7 m) long with a 99 ft 5.5 in (30.3 m) keel, a beam of 28 ft 4 in (8.6 m) and a hold depth of 13 ft 3 in (4.0 m). Her armament as a privateer was 26 guns; when fitted out in 1757 as Tartar's Prize she carried 20 six-pounder cannons along her upper deck, and four nine-pounder guns on the quarterdeck. Her designated Royal Navy complement was 160 officers and ratings.

== Active service ==
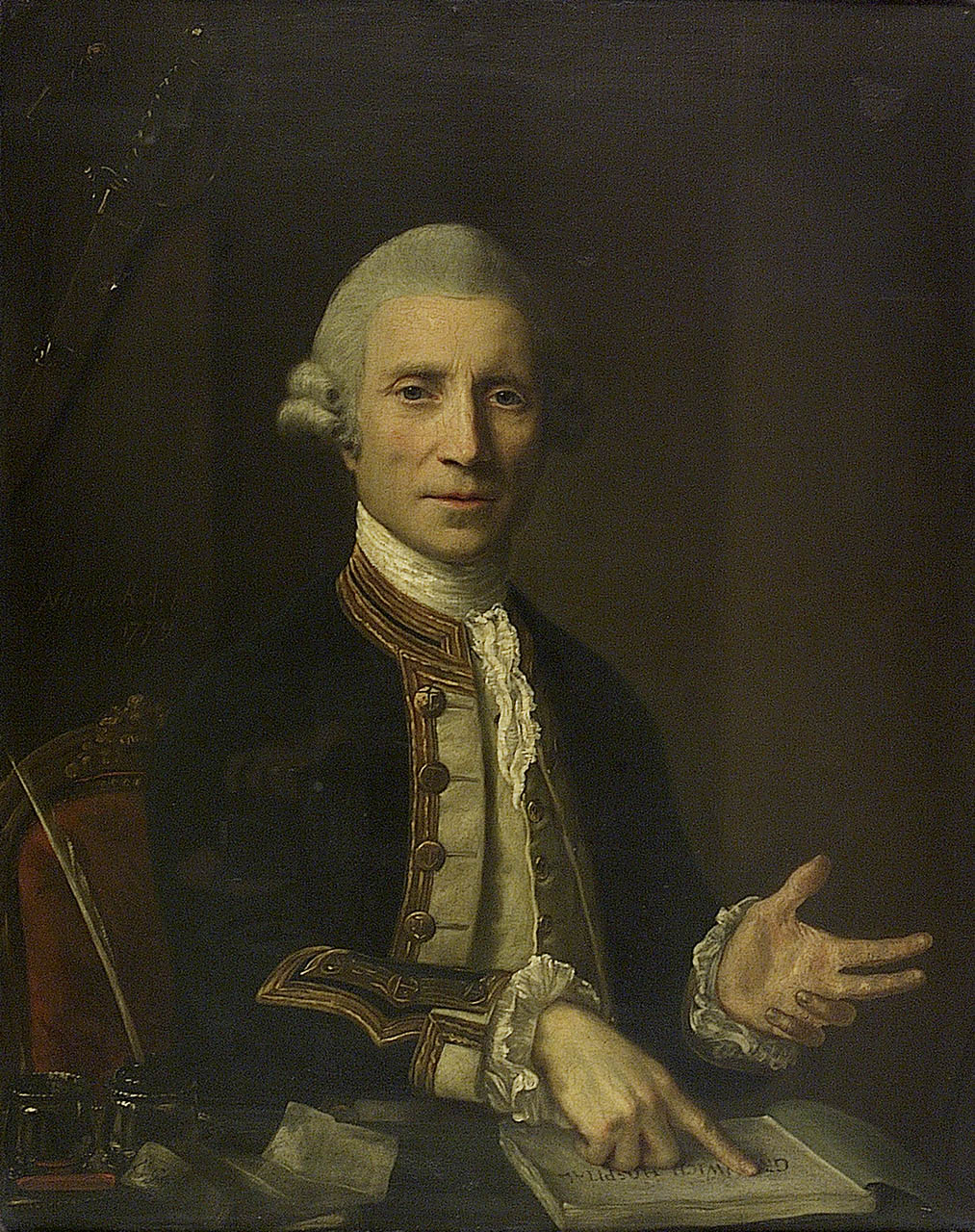
Thomas Baillie, captain of Tartar's Prize during her three years in the Royal Navy.

La Marie Victoire was put to sea in 1756, in the early stages of the Seven Years' War, to hunt British merchant ships returning home through the English Channel. She had no recorded victories; on 27 March 1756 she encountered the 28-gun sixth-rate frigate HMS Tartar and was quickly overwhelmed. A British prize crew sailed her to Portsmouth where she was purchased by the Admiralty on 29 April for a sum of £4,258 (equivalent to £800,572 in 2025). This purchase price caused dissent among Tartar's crew as Portsmouth's merchants had made a counter-offer of more than £5,000, the acceptance of which would have increased the prize money. Perhaps with an eye to their future careers, Tartar's officers accepted the Admiralty's lower offer but requested indemnification against any legal action brought by the crew for loss of earnings.

The newly purchased vessel was immediately commissioned for Royal Navy service as a sixth-rate under the name Tartar's Prize. Commander Thomas Baillie of Tartar was promoted to post-captain and transferred to take command. A survey of the vessel quickly revealed difficulties with her armament. One of the six-pounder cannons had burst during the March engagement with Tartar, and an examination of the others revealed that most were very poorly made. They were also too large; the gun barrels were 8 feet 2 inches (2.5 m) long in a gundeck measuring only 9 feet 0 inches (2.7 m) on each side, leaving insufficient room for the crew to reload when the guns had recoiled after firing. Baillie wrote to the Board of Ordnance protesting the uselessness of these oversized cannon, and was eventually rewarded with replacement six-pounders of a more standard length. He was less successful with a further problem aboard the vessel; the gun ports had no lids, leaving the gundeck constantly awash in heavy swell. Despite requests these were not installed, leaving the crew to rig canvas awnings over the open ports in order to reduce the flow of seawater into the hull.

Provisioned and manned by July, the vessel was returned to the English Channel to assist in safe convoy for a fleet of West Indiamen, and then in company with Tartar to hunt privateers. She had her first and only victory within weeks of leaving port, capturing the French vessel La Marquise de Chateaunois on 17 July. Despite this victory Tartar's Prize was experiencing considerable difficulty with her long, sleek design, which increased her speed but made her unwieldy and liable to roll in heavy weather. In August Baillie was forced to make port in Spanish Corunna so that he could restow the cargo and take on ballast to stabilise the ship. He returned Tartar's Prize to sea in September, where she promptly sprang a leak and started taking on 18 inches of water each hour. Forced back into port for repairs, Baillie wrote to Admiralty requesting stronger decking and timbers so that the hull would not keep opening up at the seams.

A different issue had arisen in the galley, which had been built to provision the small crew of a French privateer and could not cater for the Royal Navy's larger complement of 160 men. The ship's cook, Bartholomew Barry, complained that the galley's two fireplaces were in constant operation but they had no external vents, leading to a "smokiness which in truth is so great that no man living can stand it." There were no stoves, and all cooking had to be done in kettles suspended from cables over the fires. Barry reported that these kettles regularly burned through their supports and fell onto the deck, scalding the crew. There is no record of Admiralty's responses to these concerns. In October Baillie received orders assigning Tartar's Prize to the Navy's Mediterranean squadron, with which she was present at the Battle of Lagos in 1759.

On 2 March 1760 one of the vessel's hull timbers entirely gave way and she foundered off the Sardinian coast. Baillie and his crew successfully abandoned ship, were rescued by a passing Dutch merchantman and returned to England. The Admiralty apportioned no blame to any person for the loss of the vessel, but Captain Baillie was not assigned another seagoing command. Through personal connections he was awarded a shore-based position at London's Greenwich Hospital and later at the Board of Ordnance; never promoted beyond post-captain, he died in 1802.
