= HMS Cholmondely =

Cutter of the Royal Navy

History

Great Britain
- Name: HMS Cholmondely
- Launched: 1748
- Commissioned: April 1763
- Decommissioned: May 1771
- Out of service: 20 August 1771
- Fate: Sold out of service

General characteristics
- Class & type: 4-gun cutter
- Tons burthen: 79 82/94 (bm)
- Length: 57 ft 4 in (17.5 m) (overall); 44 ft 1 in (13.4 m) (keel)
- Beam: 18 ft 5 in (5.6 m)
- Sail plan: fore-and-aft rig
- Complement: 24
- Armament: 8 × 3-pounder guns (prior to Navy purchase in 1763); 4 × 3-pounder guns, 10 x 1/2-pounder swivels (1763–71)

HMS Cholmondely was a 4-gun single-masted cutter of the Royal Navy, purchased in the last days of the Seven Years' War with France. She was stationed off the Port of Liverpool for eight years from 1763, and was briefly under the command of Lieutenant (and future Admiral) Skeffington Lutwidge.

Cholmondely was sold back into private hands in 1771.

== Construction ==
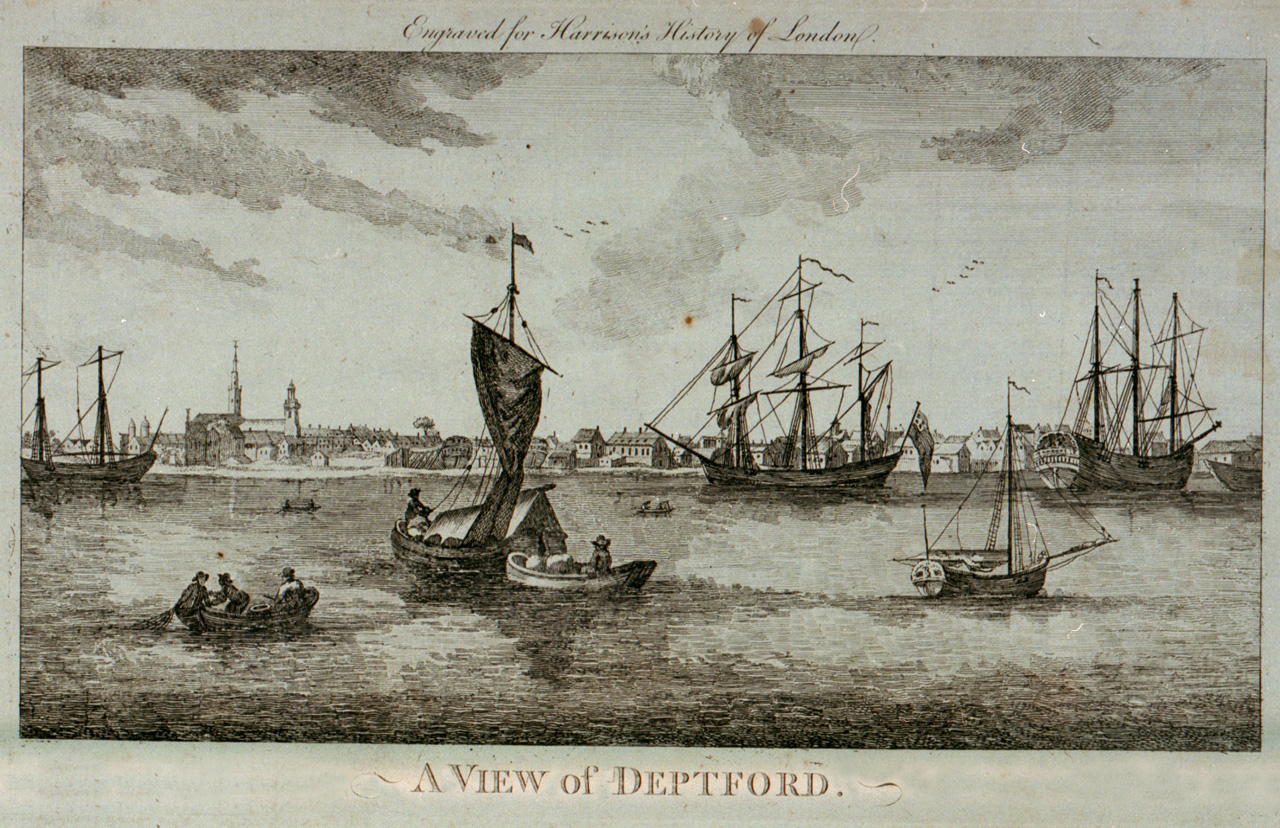
Waterfront at Deptford, where Cholmondely was commissioned in 1763.

Cholmondely was one of thirty cutters purchased by the Royal Navy in a three-month period from December 1762 to February 1763, for coastal patrol duties off English ports. The function of these purchased cutters included convoy and patrol, the carrying of messages between Naval vessels in port, and assisting the press gang in the interception of coastal craft. (Note: Merchant seamen were eligible for Navy impressment if they were aboard merchant vessels returning to English ports after trading overseas. To avoid being pressed, seamen would routinely board small coastal craft sent out to their ships before they made port. These small craft would then land the seamen on beaches outside the port proper. During the War of the Austrian Succession and the Seven Years' War, Navy cutters like Cholmondely were stationed in major seaports in order to intercept these craft and deliver those on board to the press gang in the port.)

Admiralty Orders for her purchase were issued on 29 December 1762, and the transaction was completed on 8 February 1763 at a cost of £650. She was a small craft, single-masted and with an overall length of 57 ft 4 in (17.5 m) including bowsprit, a 44 ft 1 in (13.4 m) keel, and measuring 79 82/94 tons burthen. Her beam was 18 ft 5 in (5.6 m). At the time she was purchased by the Navy, she had been at sea as a merchant vessel for at least fifteen years.

In mid-February 1763 the newly purchased cutter was sailed to Deptford Dockyard for refitting. Works ran for two months until the end of April, at a cost of £817. Prior to purchase she had been fitted for merchant voyaging including eight three-pounder guns. In recognition of her future operations within the safer confines of a major seaport, the Navy reduced the number of cannons to four and supported them with ten 1/2-pounder swivel guns for anti-personnel use.

As rebuilt for Navy service, Cholmondely had a crewing complement of 24 men.

== Naval service ==
War with France ended on 10 February 1763, after Cholmondely's purchase but before completion of her fitout or assembling of her crew. Despite this, commissioning went ahead in April 1763 and the vessel entered the Navy as a coastal cutter for the Port of Liverpool. Her first commander was 26-year-old Lieutenant Skeffington Lutwidge who would later go on to reach the Navy's most senior rank, Admiral of the Red.

In 1766 Lutwidge was replaced as Cholmondely's commander by Lieutenant Robert Edgcombe, who served aboard for two years. In 1769 he was superseded by Lieutenant Hally Borwick, who served for a single year before passing command to Thomas Cunningham. Lieutenant Cunningham remained with Cholmondely until May 1771 when the cutter was retired from sea service and her crew paid off. Surplus to requirements, she was sold to a Plymouth merchant for £225 and removed from Navy service on 20 August 1771.

== Bibliography ==
- Baugh, Daniel A. (1965). British Naval Administration in the Age of Walpole. Princeton University Press. OCLC 729683642.
- Winfield, Rif (2007). British Warships of the Age of Sail 1714–1792: Design, Construction, Careers and Fates. Seaforth. ISBN 9781844157006.
