= Alderney-class sloop =

Class overview
- Operators: Royal Navy
- Preceded by: Hunter class
- Built: 1755–1757
- In commission: 1756–1783
- Completed: 3
- Lost: 1

General characteristics (common design)
- Type: Sloop-of-war
- Tons burthen: 230 64/94 bm
- Length: 88 ft 4 in (26.9 m) (gundeck); 72 ft 3 in (22.0 m) (keel)
- Beam: 24 ft 6 in (7.5 m)
- Depth of hold: 10 ft 10 in (3.30 m) (vessels without platform in hold)
- Sail plan: Snow rig (initially – see text)
- Complement: 100
- Armament: 10 × 4-pounder guns; also 12 x ½-pounder swivel guns

The Alderney class was a class of three sloops of wooden construction built for the Royal Navy between 1755 and 1757. All three were built by contract with commercial builders to a common design prepared by William Bately, the Surveyor of the Navy.

The first two – Stork and Alderney – were ordered on 14 November 1755, and another vessel to the same design – Diligence – were ordered three months later, on 23 February 1756. All were begun as two-masted (snow-rigged) vessels, and the trio were all assigned names on 25 May 1756, but the first two were actually completed as three-masted ("ship-rigged") vessels.

== Vessels ==
Name	Ordered	Builder	Launched	Notes
Stork	14 November 1755	Daniel Stow and Benjamin Bartlett, Shoreham	8 November 1756	Captured 6 August 1758 by the French off Hispaniola.
Alderney	14 November 1755	John Snooks, Saltash	5 February 1757	Sold 1 May 1783 at Deptford.
Diligence	23 February 1756	William Wells & Co., Deptford	29 July 1756	Sold 5 December 1780 at Sheerness.
