= HMS Stork (1756) =

Sloop of the Royal Navy

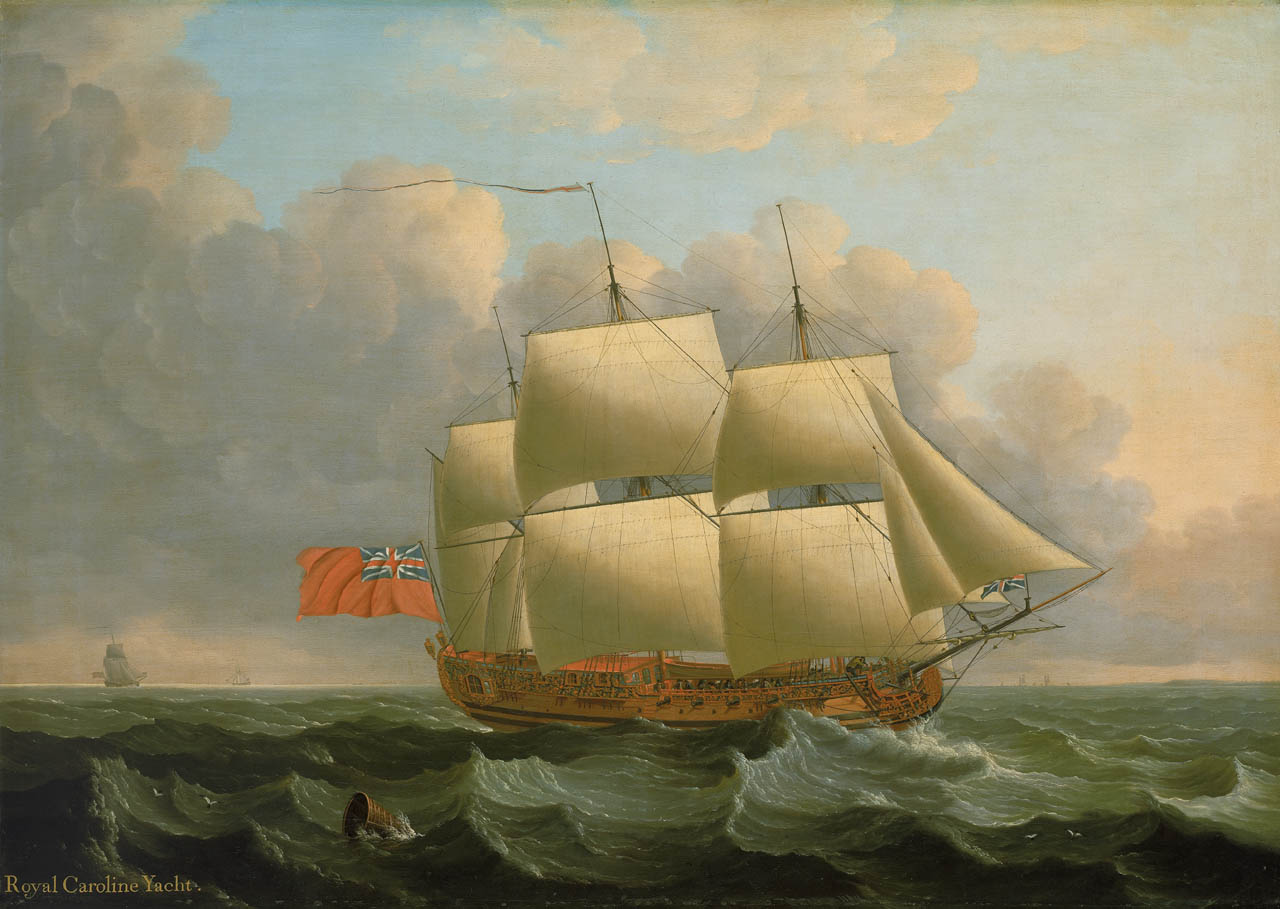
- Stork was designed to the dimensions and shape of HMY Royal Caroline (depicted, by John Cleveley the Elder, 1750).

History

Great Britain
- Name: HMS Stork
- Ordered: 14 November 1755
- Builder: Daniel Stow & Benjamin Bartlett, Shoreham-by-Sea
- Laid down: early 1756
- Launched: 8 November 1756
- Completed: 8 February 1757 at Portsmouth Dockyard
- Commissioned: September 1756
- In service: 1757–1758
- Captured: 6 August 1758 by 74-gun Palmier

History

France
- Name: Stork
- Acquired: 6 August 1758
- Commissioned: 6 August 1758
- Decommissioned: December 1759
- Stricken: 1760
- Fate: Removed from service

General characteristics
- Class & type: 10-gun Alderney-class sloop
- Tons burthen: 232 74/94 bm
- Length: 88 ft 7 in (27.0 m) (gundeck); 72 ft 5 in (22.1 m) (keel)
- Beam: 24 ft 7 in (7.5 m)
- Depth of hold: 10 ft 10.5 in (3.3 m)
- Sail plan: ship rig
- Complement: 100 personnel, comprising; 2 commissioned officers; 9 warrant officers; 15 petty officers; 55 naval ratings; 19 servants and other ranks
- Armament: 10 × 4-pdrs; 12 × 1/2-pdr swivel guns

HMS Stork was a 10-gun Alderney-class sloop of the Royal Navy which saw active service during the Seven Years' War. Launched in 1757, she was assigned to the Navy's Jamaica Station until August 1758 when she was captured by the French. She remained in French hands until being disarmed in 1759 and removed from service in 1760.

== Construction ==
Stork was one of three vessels built to a 1755 design by Surveyor of the Navy William Bately, and collectively known as Alderney-class sloops in recognition of HMS Alderney which was the first to be formally contracted for construction. This was Bately's first experience with vessel design, for which he substantially borrowed from the shape and dimensions of George II's yacht HMY Royal Caroline, built in 1750 by Master Shipwright John Hollond. Bately then added to Hollond's hull design by lengthening the "fore-rake" – the area of the bow that extended beyond the keel – in order to improve the sloop's stability in heavy swell.

Admiralty Orders of 14 November 1755 indicated that the Alderney-class vessels were to be built at private dockyards, leaving the Royal Dockyards fully engaged in constructing or fitting-out the larger ships of the line. For previous Navy contracts the prices quoted by Thames River shipyards had proved exorbitant, and the Navy Board had evidence that the shipwrights were colluding to fix higher rates for construction work. In consequence only regional shipwrights were invited to bid for Stork, with the contract awarded on 17 December 1755 to Daniel Stow and Benjamin Bartlett of Shoreham-by-Sea. Contract terms stipulated that the vessel be completed within seven months at a cost of £7.12s.6d per ton burthen, well below the average rate of £9.0s per ton quoted by Thames River shipyards for Navy vessels of similar size.

The new vessel's keel was laid in early 1756 and work commenced on the hull. Bately's initial design was for a two-masted snow-rigged sloop, but this was modified in mid-1756 into a traditional three-masted ship rig to increase speed at the expense of manoeuvrability. When completed, the vessel was 88 ft 7 in (27.0 m) long with a 72 ft 5 in (22.1 m) keel, a beam of 24 ft 0 in (7.3 m) and a deep 10 ft 10.5 in (3.3 m) hold. Fitted out for Royal Navy service she was lightly armed with 10 four-pounder cannons ranged along her upper deck, accompanied by 12 1/2-pounder swivel guns for anti-personnel use.

The half-built sloop was formally christened Stork on 25 May 1756. However Stow and Bartlett ultimately failed to meet the contracted deadline of seven months for Stork's construction, and the sloop was not launched until 8 November 1756. After launch she was sailed to Portsmouth Dockyard for fitting out and to take on guns and crew.

== Active service ==
Stork was commissioned into the Navy her appointed captain, Commander William Tucker, in September 1756, while still under construction at Shoreham-by-Sea. Fitting out at Portsmouth was completed by 8 February 1757, including the loading of guns and stores. Her designated complement was 100, comprising two commissioned officers – a captain and a lieutenant – overseeing 9 warrant and 15 petty officers, 55 naval ratings, and 19 servants and other ranks. Among these other ranks were two positions reserved for widow's men – fictitious crew members whose pay would subsequently be reallocated to the families of dead sailors.

Despite her fit out, Stork was not immediately assigned a station at sea and remained anchored off Portsmouth. Tucker was promoted to captain in January 1757 and transferred away from Stork in May. He was replaced by Commander Peter Carteret who would remain with the vessel for rest of her Royal Navy service.

Carteret brought Admiralty Orders for Stork to join the Navy squadron in Jamaica and assist with defending merchant shipping from French privateers. The sloop set sail for Jamaica on 30 June 1757 to take up this post, but her service was short-lived. On 6 August 1758 she encountered Le Palmier, a French 74-gun ship of the line, off the Hispaniola coast; the outgunned British vessel was surrendered without resistance, and her crew taken prisoner.

Stork was promptly converted into a French Navy vessel of the same name, and joined the French Caribbean squadron based in Martinique. Her Royal Navy cannons were removed and transferred to larger vessels; in their place Stork received 14 French-made 4-pounder guns, two 3-pounders and 16 antiquated pierriers à boîte for anti-personnel use. By December 1759, after a year of uneventful service, even these guns were removed. Now entirely disarmed, Stork ceased to be of value and was deleted from French service; she last appears in Navy records in 1760.
