= HMS Spy (1756) =

British naval sloop, privateer, merchant ship, slave ship, and whaler (1756–1792)

History

Great Britain
- Name: HMS Spy
- Ordered: 9 July 1755
- Builder: Robert Inwood, Rotherhithe
- Laid down: 25 July 1755
- Launched: 3 February 1756
- Fate: Sold 3 September 1773.

Great Britain
- Name: Spy
- Acquired: Circa 1773 by purchase
- Renamed: 1780: Mars; 1783: Tartar; 1787: Southampton
- Fate: Last listed 1792

General characteristics
- Class & type: Bonetta-class sloop
- Tons burthen: 22275/94, or 230, or 250 (bm)
- Length: Overall: 85 ft 10 in (26.2 m); Keel: 70 ft 3 1/8 in (21.4 m)
- Beam: 24 ft 5 in (7.4 m)
- Depth of hold: 10 ft 10 in (3.3 m)
- Sail plan: Snow
- Complement: Privateer: 130; Royal Navy: 100
- Armament: Privateer: 24 × 6&4–pounder guns + 10 swivel guns; Royal Navy: 10 × short 6-pouner guns + 12 × ½-pounder swivel guns; 1779: 6 × 3-pounder guns; 1781: 16 × 6-pounder + 4 × 4-pounder guns

HMS Spy was a Bonetta-class sloop launched at Rotherhithe in 1756 for the Royal Navy. The Navy sold her in 1773. From 1776, or perhaps earlier she was a transport. Then from 1780 to 1783, as Mars, she was first a privateer and then a slave ship, engaged in the triangular trade in enslaved persons. Between 1783 and 1787 her name was Tartar, and she traded with the Mediterranean. From 1787, as Southampton, she was a whaler in the British southern whale fishery. She made at least four complete whaling voyages and was last listed in 1792.

== HMS Spy ==
Commander Richard Hughes commissioned Spy in February 1756, in the Downs.

In November Spy was under the command of Commander William Bayne. She sailed her for New York on 8 May 1757. She spent 1858 cruising. At some point in late 1758 or early 1759 Spy and Portmahon captured Guillaume. Bayne was also her commander when Spy captured the French privateer Banaba on 29 December 1758.

In March 1760 Spy was under the command of Commander William Phillips, and cruising in Home waters.

In November 1761 she was under the command of Commander Thomas Hayward. He paid her off in late 1762 or early 1763. She then underwent a survey on 22 March 1763.

Commander William Phillips recommissioned Spy in March 1763. He then sailed for Newfoundland on 22 May 1764.

In 1765 Spy was under the command of Commander Thomas Allwright, at Newfoundland. She was paid off in December 1767.

Spy was surveyed on 23 June 1768. Between March 1769 and September 1770, she underwent a Small Repair at Deptford.

Commander James Worth recommissioned Spy in July 1770. He sailed her for the Leeward Islands on 5 October.

Spy was paid off in 1772.

Disposal: Spy was surveyed in July 1773 and sold at Sheerness on 3 September, for £240.

== Mercantile Spy ==
Missing volumes of Lloyd's Register (LR) have resulted in Spy first appearing in the register in 1776. From this volume on, throughout her history and name changes, the register gave her launch year as 1758, and her origins as the "King's Yard, perhaps because she was completed at the Royal Dockyards at Deptford.

Year	Master	Owner	Trade	Source
1776	T.Pickering	James Mather	London transport	LR
1779	Blomer	J.Mather	London tender	LR

== Mars ==
Mars, ex-Spy, appeared in Lloyd's Register in 1780.

Year	Master	Owner	Trade	Source
1780	N.Darby	Mather & Co.	London privateer	LR; thorough repair

Nicholas Darby acquired a letter of marque on 22 July 1780.

Lloyd's List reported in January 1781 that the privateer Mars had sent into Dartmouth a Dutch vessel that had been sailing from Lisbon to Rouen with a cargo of cotton, rice, etc. Mars had sailed from Dartmouth on 28 December 1780.

Mars then switched from privateering to the slave trade.

Year	Master	Owner	Trade	Source
1781	N.Darby; R.Patterson	Mather & Co.	London privateer London–Africa	LR; thorough repair 1780
1782	R.Patterson	J.Mather	London–Africa	LR; thorough repair 1780

Slave trading voyage (1782–1783): Captain Robert Patterson sailed from London on 14 January 1782, bound for the Gold Coast. Mars started acquiring captives on 30 April, first at Cape Coast Castle, and then at Anomabu. She sailed from Africa on 29 September and arrived at Kingston, Jamaica on 3 December. She arrived with 284 captives; she landed 275. She arrived back at London on 19 July 1793.

== Tartar ==
Tartar, ex-Mars, appeared in Lloyd's Register in 1783.

Year	Master	Owner	Trade	Source & notes
1783	Plowman	Powell & Co.	London–Straits [of Gibraltar]	LR; thorough repair 1780
1786	J.Smith	St Barbe & Co.	London–Smyrna	LR; thorough repair 1780

== Southampton ==
Southampton, ex-Tartar, appeared in Lloyd's Register in 1787. She then became a whaler.

Year	Master	Owner	Trade	Source & notes
1787	W.Akin	St Barbe	London–Southern Fishery	LR thorough repair 1778 & 1787

1st whaling voyage (1787–1788): Captain William Aikin (or Aiken), sailed from London on 31 August 1787, bound for the Brazil Banks. Southampton returned on 20 June 1788 with 18 tuns of sperm oil, 64 tuns of whale oil, and 40 cwt of bone. She had killed 15 whales.

2nd whaling voyage (1788–1789): Captain Akin (or Atkinson) sailed from Southampton on 28 August 1788, for the southern fishery. In a letter dated 1 December 1788 Akin reported that Southampton was on the Brazil Coast in latitude 35°30'S. He further reported on the weather and with news of several other whalers. Southampton returned to Southampton on 12 May 1789 with 12 tun of whale oil.

3rd whaling voyage (1789–1790): Captain A. Muirhead from Southampton on 11 September 1789, bound for Walvis Bay. Southampton was reported in December to have been at Bonavista. She left Walwich Bay on 14 October and Saint Helena on 5 November, and on her return to England report on whales she had left either location. She arrived at Cowes on 30 December 1790.

4th whaling voyage (1791–1792): Captain Sam Marshall sailed from Southampton on 10 July 1791. On 20 August she was well at Porto Praya. Lloyd's List reported in October 1792 that Southampton, Marshall, master, had returned to Southampton from the South Seas.

5th whaling voyage (1793?): Although there is a record that Captain Hart sailed, or intended to sail Southampton to the Brazil Banks in 1793, there is no record in Lloyd's List's ship arrival and departure data of her departure or return. Furthermore, she is last listed in Lloyd's Register in 1792.
