= HMS Unicorn (1748) =

Unicorn-class Royal Navy frigate

History

Great Britain
- Name: HMS Unicorn
- Ordered: 29 April 1747
- Builder: Plymouth Dockyard
- Laid down: 3 July 1747
- Launched: 7 December 1748
- Christened: 29 May 1747
- Completed: 17 July 1749
- Fate: Broken up December 1771 at Sheerness Dockyard

General characteristics
- Class & type: Unicorn-class frigate
- Tons burthen: 58150/94 (bm)
- Length: 117 ft 10 in (35.9 m)
- Beam: 33 ft 8 in (10.3 m)
- Depth of hold: 10 ft 2 in (3.1 m)
- Sail plan: Full-rigged ship
- Complement: 160 (increased to 180 on 22 September 1756, and to 200 on 11 November 1756)
- Armament: Upper deck: 24 × 9-pounder guns; QD: 4 × 3-pounder guns; Fc: Nil; Also 12 Swivel guns

HMS Unicorn was a 28-gun Unicorn-class sixth-rate frigate of the Royal Navy. She was originally ordered as a 24-gun ship to the draft of the French privateer Tyger. The third vessel of the Royal Navy to bear the name, Unicorn, as well as HMS Lyme which was a near-sister, were the first true frigates built for the Royal Navy. They were actually completed with 28 guns including the four smaller weapons on the quarterdeck, but the latter were not included in the ship's official establishment until 22 September 1756. The two ships differed in detail, Unicorn having a beakhead bow, a unicorn figurehead, two-light quarter galleries, and only five pairs of quarterdeck gunports, while Lyme had a round bow, a lion figurehead, three-light quarter galleries, and six pairs of quarterdeck gunports.

Unicorn was first commissioned in March 1749 under Captain Molyneaux Shuldham, under whose command she spent her first commission in the Mediterranean until returning home to pay off at Deptford in June 1752. After repairs, she was recommissioned in January 1753 under Captain Matthew Buckle, and sailed for the Mediterranean again in April 1753. In February 1756 command passed to Captain James Galbraith; in September Captain John Rawling replaced Galbraith.

Unicorn captured the French frigate Vestale on 8 January 1761. Vestale, under the command of M. Boisbertelot, had been part of a squadron of five ships that had left the Vilaine river for Brest under the cover of a heavy fog. When Unicorn encountered Vestale off the Penmarks a two-hour engagement ensued until Vestale struck. Hunt received a wound at the third broadside and died of his injuries an hour after the action ended. The British had five killed and ten wounded, the majority of them dangerously. The French had many killed and wounded, among them Captain Boisbertelot, who lost a leg and died of his wounds the next day. Lieutenant John Symons, who took command of Unicorn on Hunt's death, described Vestale as having twenty-six 12 and 9-pounder guns on her lower deck, and four 6-pounders on her quarterdeck; she also had a crew of 220 men. The Royal Navy took Vestale into service as HMS Flora.

The next day a French frigate approached Unicorn, but then sailed away. The day after that Unicorn came upon Seahorse engaging the same French frigate. Although Unicorn chased the French vessel, which later turned out to be L'Aigrette, she escaped. Unicorn was hampered in her sailing by the damage to her masts and rigging from the battle with Vestale.

== Fate ==
After active and continuous service during the Seven Years' War, Unicorn finally paid off in late 1763, and was broken up in 1771.
