= Bonetta-class sloop =

Class overview
- Operators: Royal Navy
- Preceded by: Cruizer (1752) class
- Built: 1755-1756
- In commission: 1756-1778
- Completed: 3
- Lost: 1

General characteristics (common design)
- Type: Sloop-of-war
- Tons burthen: 220 43/94 bm
- Length: 85 ft 10 in (26.2 m) (gundeck); 70 ft 0 in (21.3 m) (keel)
- Beam: 24 ft 4 in (7.4 m)
- Depth of hold: 10 ft 10 in (3.30 m) (vessels without platform in hold)
- Sail plan: Snow rig
- Complement: 100
- Armament: 10 × 6-pounder (short) guns; also 12 x ½-pounder swivel guns

The Bonetta class was a class of three sloops of wooden construction built for the Royal Navy between 1755 and 1756. All three were built by contract with commercial builders to a common design prepared by Thomas Slade, the Surveyor of the Navy.

All three were ordered on 9 July 1755, assigned names on 29 July 1755, and were built as two-masted snow-rigged vessels.

== Vessels ==
Name	Ordered	Builder	Launched	Notes
Bonetta	9 July 1755	Henry Bird, Globe Stairs, Rotherhithe	4 February 1756	Sold 1 November 1776 at Woolwich.
Merlin	9 July 1755	John Quallett, Rotherhithe	20 March 1756	Captured 23 August 1778 by the French in the Mediterranean. (Recaptured 26 August 1780 by British privateer Fame and burnt).
Spy	9 July 1755	Robert Inwood, Rotherhithe	3 February 1756	Sold 3 September 1773 at Sheerness.
