= HMS Alderney (1757) =

Sloop of the Royal Navy

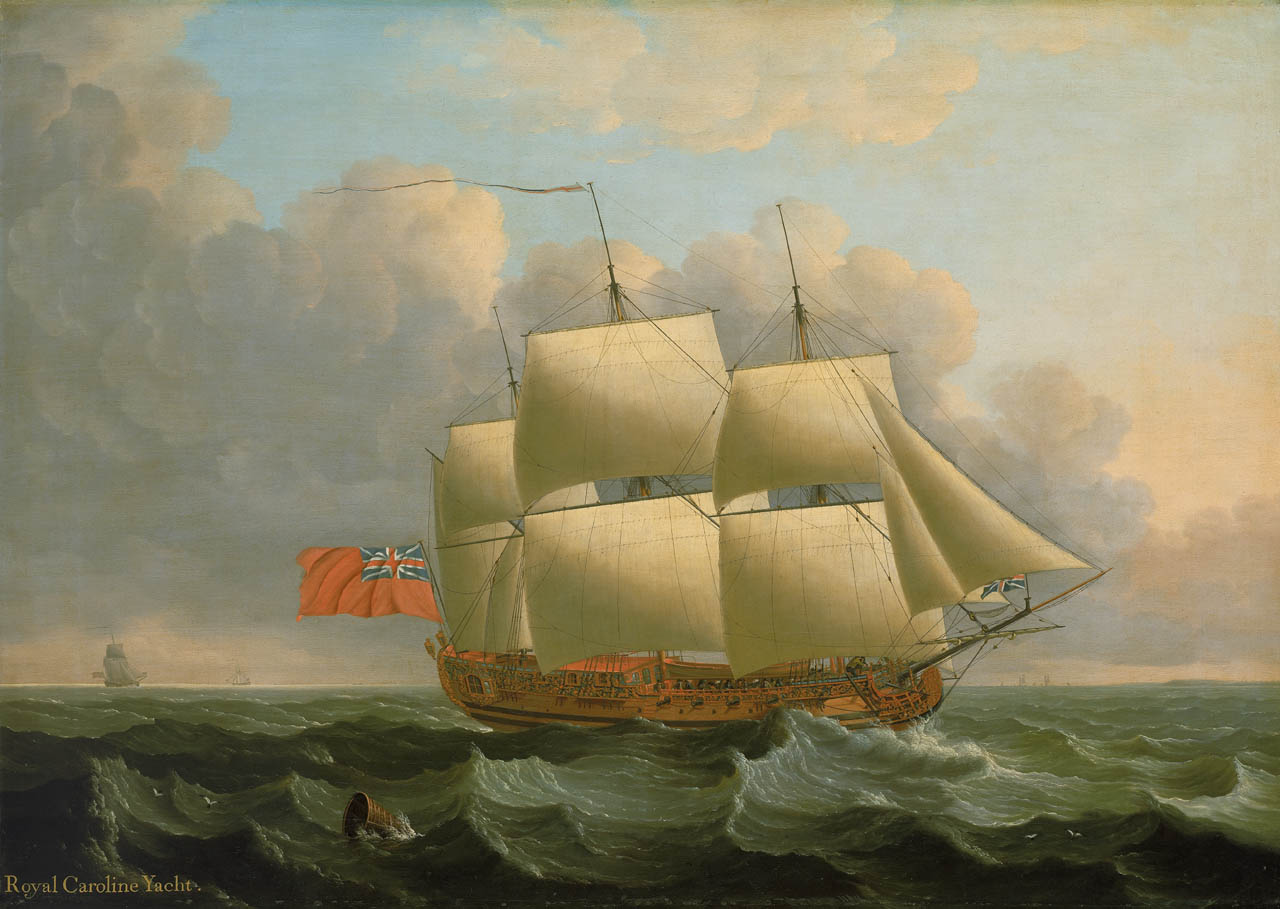
- Alderney was designed to the dimensions and shape of HMY Royal Caroline (depicted, by John Cleveley the Elder, 1750).

History

Great Britain
- Name: HMS Alderney
- Namesake: Alderney
- Ordered: 14 November 1755
- Builder: John Snooks, Saltash
- Laid down: 12 January 1756
- Launched: 5 February 1757
- Completed: 27 April 1757 at Saltash
- Commissioned: November 1756
- Decommissioned: Early 1783
- In service: 1757–1764; 1767–1783
- Out of service: 1764–1767
- Fate: Sold out of service at Deptford Dockyard, 1 May 1783

General characteristics
- Class & type: 10-gun Alderney-class sloop
- Tons burthen: 235 39/94, bm
- Length: 88 ft 4 in (26.9 m) (gundeck); 72 ft 3 in (22.0 m) (keel)
- Beam: 24 ft 9 in (7.5 m)
- Depth of hold: 10 ft 10 1/2 in (3.3 m)
- Sail plan: ship rig
- Complement: 100
- Armament: 1757–1780:10 × 4-pounder guns; 1780–1783:12 × 4-pounder guns

Great Britain
- Name: Alderney
- Port of registry: London
- Builder: Kings Yard (Deptford)
- Acquired: 1784 by purchase
- Refit: 1784
- Captured: March 1797

General characteristics
- Tons burthen: 260, or 270 bm
- Sail plan: Ship rig
- Complement: 30
- Armament: 10 × 4-pounder guns + 4 swivel guns

HMS Alderney was a 10-gun (later, 12-gun) Alderney-class sloop of the Royal Navy that saw active service during the Seven Years' War and the American Revolutionary War. Launched in 1757, she was principally deployed in the North Sea to protect British fishing fleets and merchant trade. In this capacity she captured two American privateers, Hawk in 1779 and the 12-gun Lady Washington in 1780. She was removed from Navy service at the conclusion of the American Revolutionary War, and sold into private hands at Deptford Dockyard on 1 May 1783. She became the whaler Alderney that operated between 1784 and 1797, when the Spaniards captured her off Chile.

== Construction ==
Alderney was the first of three vessels built to a 1755 design by Surveyor of the Navy William Bately, which collectively became known as Alderney-class sloops. These three vessels were Bately's first experience with ship design, for which he substantially borrowed from the shape and dimensions of George II's yacht HMY Royal Caroline, built in 1750 by Master Shipwright John Hollond. Bately then added to Hollond's hull design by lengthening the "fore-rake" – the area of the bow that extended beyond the keel – in order to improve the sloop's stability in heavy swell.

Admiralty Orders of 14 November 1755 indicated that the Alderney-class vessels were to be built at private dockyards, and on 17 December 1755 the contract for Alderney was issued to commercial shipwright John Snooks of Saltash. Contract terms stipulated that the vessel be completed within seven months at a cost of £7.13s per ton burthen. The new vessel's keel was laid in January 1756 and work commenced on the hull. Bately's initial design was for a two-masted snow-rigged sloop, but this was modified in mid-1756 into a traditional three-masted ship rig to increase speed, though at the expense of manoeuvrability. The half-built sloop was formally christened Alderney on 25 May 1756.

== HMS ==
In mid-March 1761, Alderney captured a French privateer of six guns behind the Isle of Wight and took her into Portsmouth.

On 7 July 1777, Alderney, Captain Anthony Parrey, was off the Texel when he captured the American ship Commerce, Samuel Williams, master, as Commerce was sailing from South Carolina to Amsterdam. Commerce was a new vessel of 300 tons (bm), with a crew of 14 men, carrying a cargo of rice and indigo. She had on board as passengers Lieutenant Governor Bull and his family. Parrey put a prize crew on board Commerce, escorted her as far as Lowestoffe, and then sent her into London.

On 24 February 1779 Alderney captured the American privateer Hawk.

On 19 January 1781, Alderney, John Lockart Nasmith, captain, captured the Dutch dogger Sansleid. Then on 13 April Alderney recaptured the sloop Furnace. A few days later, i.e., on 19 April, Alderney was in company with the cutter Liberty, and the revenue cutter Hunter when they captured the French privateer Puce.

On 25 December 1780, Alderney, under the command of Lieutenant Rose, captured the American privateer Lady Washington, of Dunkirk, under the command of Captain John Oliver. Lady Washington was armed with 12 guns and had a crew of 51 men.

Disposal: In 1783, the Royal Navy sold the 26-year old sloop Alderney, of 230 tons (bm), at Deptford, on 1 May 1783 for £780.

== Whaler ==
Alderney entered British shipping registers when she appeared in Lloyd's Register for 1784, having undergone in 1783 a "good repair" and having been "raised" at Kings Yard. She was described as being a ship of 260 tons (bm), and copper sheathed.

Alderney's first master was Wardell, her owner J. Montgomerie, and her trade London-Greenland, that is, whaling. Alderney and Wardel were reported to have returned to London from Greenland in early July 1786 having taken four "fish" (whales). On 17 June 1787 she was reported again to have taken four fish.

On 22 June 1790, Alderney, Captain Sinclair Halcrow, master, was in the Davis Strait in the Labrador Sea. There her harpooner, Lawrence Frazier, at 6p.m. used a harpoon gun to shoot a whale at a distance of eight fathoms from the boat. The whale took about half-an-hour to die. Lloyd's Register for 1791 showed Alderney's master as S. Halcrow, her owner as Priestly, and her trade changing from London-Davis Straits to London-South Seas Fishery.

From 1791 Alderney appeared among the ships whaling in the Southern Whale Fishery. On 11 November 1791 she left Britain under the command of Captain Sinclair Halcrow. She returned on 21 December 1792. At the time, her owners were Curtis & Co. and Priestly.

In 1793 Halcrow sailed her to Patagonia. With the outbreak of the French Revolutionary Wars early that year, Halcrow acquired a letter of marque on 3 August 1793.

In 1794 Halcrow sailed her to Peru. She was reported to have been "all well" off the coast of Peru on 12 October 1794. She returned to Britain on 18 September 1795 with 116 tuns sperm oil and 2769 seal skins. Her owners were Timothy and William Curtis.

Captain Samuel Chace (or Case, or Case), sailed Alderney from Britain for Peru on 9 March 1796. She was on the coast of Chile in December 1796 and off Coquimbo on 16 December 1796. It was then reported that the Spanish had taken her off Chile. Her owners were Curtis & Co, and Parkinson. Still she enters Lloyd's Register in 1798, still with Chase, master, Parkinson, owner, and trade London—South Seas fishery.

== Fate ==
The Spanish captured her off Concepción, Chile, in March 1797.
