= HMS Tartar (1756) =

Lowestoffe-class Royal Navy frigate

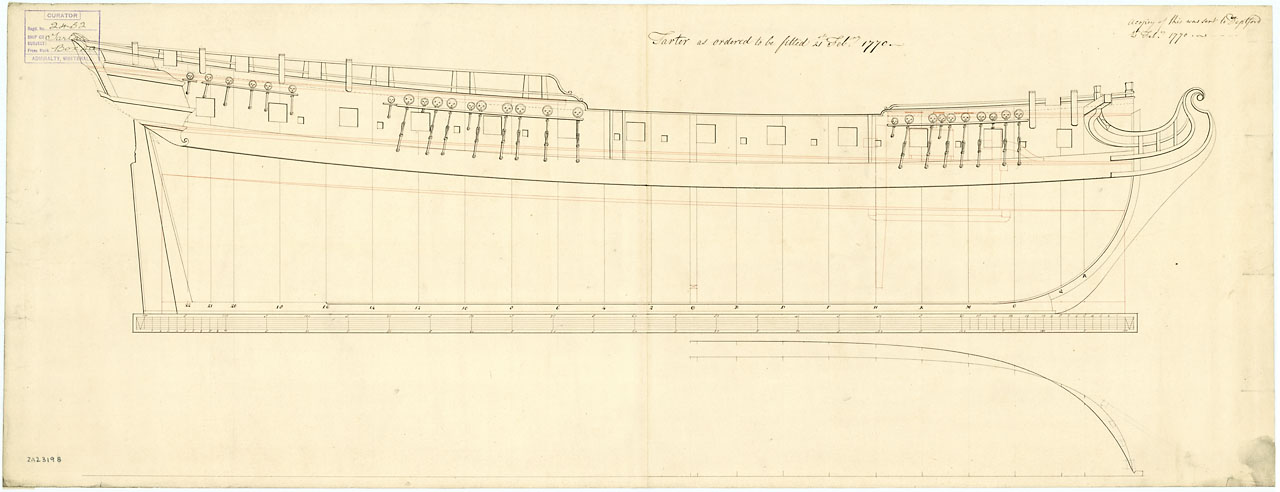
- Tartar (original plan)

History

Great Britain
- Name: Tartar
- Operator: Royal Navy
- Ordered: 12 June 1755
- Builder: John Randall's yard, Nelson Dock, Rotherhithe
- Laid down: 4 July 1755
- Launched: 3 April 1756
- Completed: 2 May 1756 at Deptford Dockyard
- Fate: Wrecked 1 April 1797

General characteristics
- Class & type: Lowestoffe-class sixth-rate frigate
- Tons burthen: 587 19/94 (bm) (4 tons more than designed)
- Length: 117 ft 10 in (35.9 m) (gundeck); 96 ft 11 in (29.5 m) (keel)
- Beam: 33 ft 9 in (10.3 m)
- Depth of hold: 10 ft 3 in (3.1 m)
- Sail plan: Full-rigged ship
- Complement: 200 officers and men
- Armament: Upperdeck: 24 × 9-pounder guns; QD: 4 × 3-pounder guns; 12 × swivel guns

HMS Tartar was a 28-gun sixth-rate frigate of the Royal Navy.

== Naval career ==
Tartar was designed by Sir Thomas Slade and based on Lyme of 1748, "with such alterations as may tend to the better stowing of men and carrying for guns."

The ship was first commissioned in March 1756 under Captain John Lockhart, and earned a reputation as a fast sailer during service in the English Channel. She made many captures of French ships during the Seven Years' War, including 4 in 1756 and 7 the following year.

Vessels captured or sunk by Tartar during the Seven Years' War
Date	Ship	Home port	Type	Fate	Ref.
August 1756	Le Cerf	Saint-Malo, France	Privateer, 24 guns & 200 crew	Captured, 23 killed	
By October 1756	Hero	Saint-Malo, France	Privateer, 14 guns & 162 crew	Captured, 1 killed	
October 1756	Le Grand Gideon	Granville, France	Privateer, 22 guns & 215 crew	Captured, 7 killed	
October 1756	Le Montrozier	La Rochelle, France	Privateer, 3 guns & 190 crew	Captured, 58 killed	
March 1757	La Victoire	Le Havre, France	Privateer, 24 guns & 275 crew	Captured, 30 killed	
April 1757	Le Duc d'Aguillon	Saint-Malo, France	Privateer, 26 guns & 303 crew	Captured, 47 killed	
May 1757	La Penelope	Morlaix, France	Privateer, 18 guns & 190 crew	Captured, 14 killed	(Note: One contemporary newspaper report gives the name of this privateer as Phillip.)
October 1757	La Comtesse de Gramont	Not recorded	Privateer, 18 guns	Captured	
November 1757	La Melpomene	Bayonne, France	Privateer, 26 guns	Captured	

During the peace that followed, the ship sailed to Barbados carrying a timekeeper built by John Harrison, as a part of a series of experiments used to determine longitude at sea.

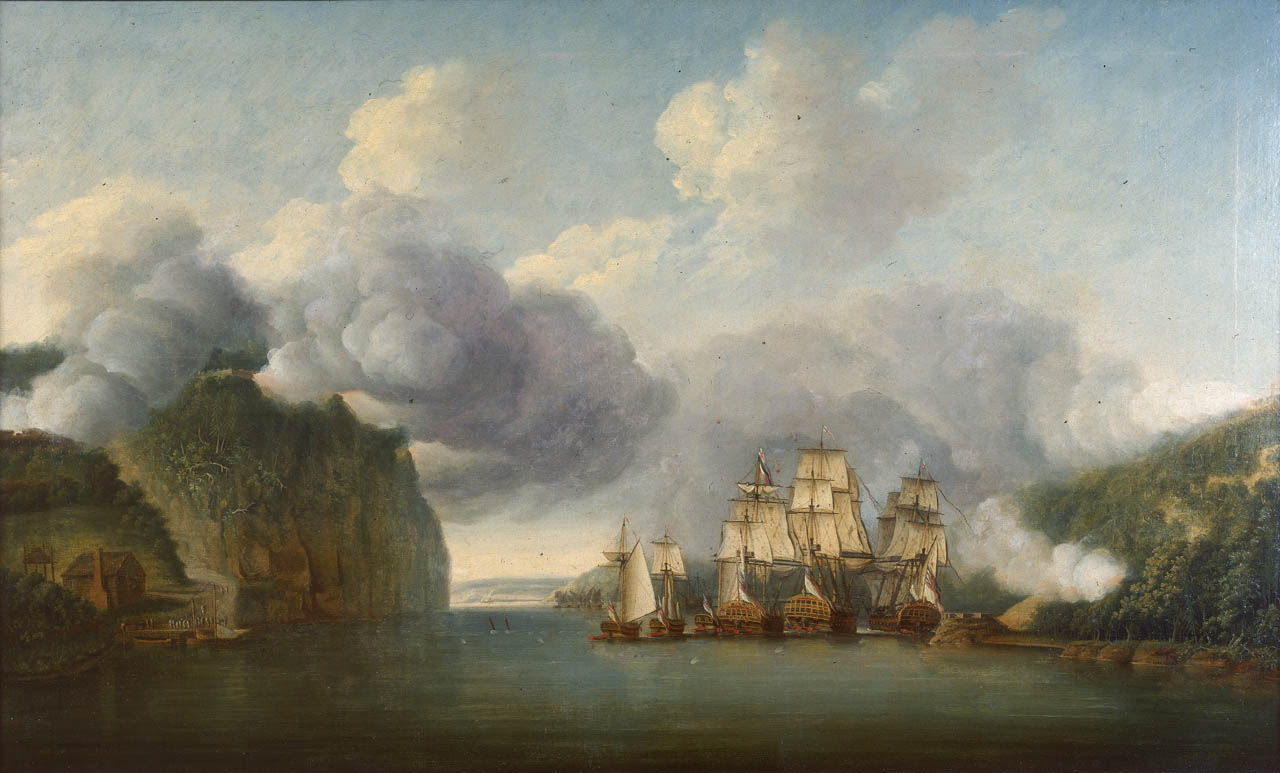
Roebuck with Phoenix, Tartar and three smaller vessels passing forts Washington and Lee on the Hudson River, in the run up to the Battle of Fort Washington

American Revolutionary War:On 9 October, 1776 she was in action on the Hudson River, with HMS Roebuck and HMS Phoenix, forced her way upstream, whilst engaging, on either side, the two forts of Washington and Lee. The next day she, HMS Roebuck, and HMS Phoenix captured the abandoned Connecticut Navy galley "Crane" in the Hudson River. She destroyed an American vessel off New Jersey 1 April 1777. and capturing the Spanish Santa Margarita of 28 guns off Cape Finisterre on 11 November 1779.

She went on to see further service during the French Revolutionary War. On 14 December the French frigate Minerve captured off the island of Ivica the collier Hannibal, which was sailing from Liverpool to Naples. However, eleven days later, Tartar recaptured Hannibal off Toulon and sent her into Corsica.

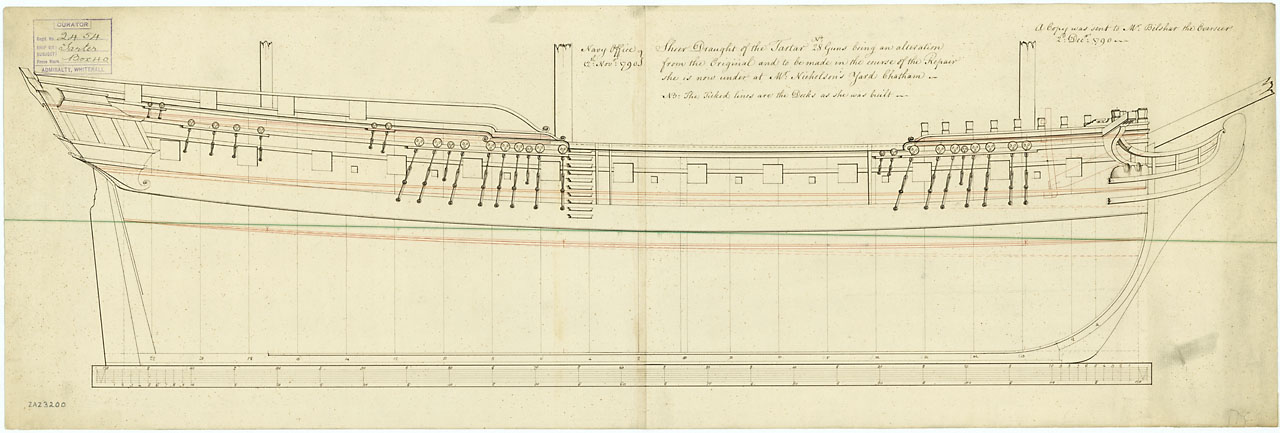
Tartar, showing alterations made in 1790 during repairs at Chatham by Mr Nicholson's Yard. The decks were raised, as shown by the ticked red lines.

Tartar was part of the fleet under Lord Hood that occupied Toulon in August 1793. With HMS Courageux, Meleager, Egmont and Robust, she covered the landing, on 27 August, of 1500 troops sent to remove the republicans occupying the forts guarding the port. Once the forts were secure, the remainder of Hood's fleet, accompanied by 17 Spanish ships-of-the-line which had just arrived, sailed into the harbour. Tartar was wrecked off Saint-Domingue on 1 April 1797.
