= HMS Lyme (1748) =

Unicorn-class Royal Navy frigate

History

Great Britain
- Name: HMS Lyme
- Operator: Royal Navy
- Ordered: 29 April 1747
- Builder: Deptford Dockyard
- Laid down: 24 September 1747
- Launched: 10 December 1748
- Christened: 2 August 1748
- Fate: Wrecked off the Baltic coast of Sweden 18 October 1760

General characteristics
- Class & type: Unicorn-class frigate
- Tons burthen: 586 76/94 (bm)
- Length: 117 ft 10 in (35.92 m)
- Beam: 33 ft 10 in (10.31 m) (2 inches more than designed)
- Depth of hold: 9 ft 10 in (3.00 m)
- Sail plan: Full-rigged ship
- Complement: 160 men (raised to 180 on 22 September 1756, and then to 200 on 11 November 1756)
- Armament: Gundeck: 24 × 9-pounder guns; Quarterdeck: 4 × 3-pounder guns; 12 × 1/2-pounder swivels

HMS Lyme was a 28-gun, sixth-rate frigate of the Royal Navy which saw service against France in the Seven Years' War. Principally a hunter of privateers, she was also intended to be a match for contemperaneous French frigates which had shown to be faster and more maneuvreable than their British equivalents. To this end her design was essentially a replica of a captured French vessel Le Tygre, with minor reductions in dimensions and armament. Over twelve years at sea she captured four French privateers and ably contributed to several actions against larger but slower enemy craft. Her record, along with that of her sister ship HMS Unicorn, provided impetus for the Royal Navy to abandon its overly conservative 1719 Establishment for vessel design, and introduce what would later be known as "true frigates" with a single gundeck and much improved seaworthiness and speed.

== Construction ==
Lyme was an oak-built sixth-rate, one of two vessels forming the Unicorn class of frigates.

As with her sister ship Unicorn she was intended to be a replica of Le Tygre, a 26-gun French privateer captured off Ushant on 22 February 1747. Le Tygre's capture had been made by the 50-gun HMS Falkland after a three and a half hour chase. The capture coincided with plans by Admiralty to commence a continuous blockade of French Atlantic ports in the final years of the War of the Austrian Succession, which neccesitated the building of vessels capable of overhauling French privateers in all weathers. While a subsequent Admiralty survey of Le Tygre noted her light and poor-quality materials, it emphasised her "great character for sailing" which had aided in prolonging her attempted escape. On considering the survey, the Admiralty Board under George Anson elected to construct two prototype vessels, Lyme and Unicorn to Le Tygre's general design.

Lyme was actually completed with 28 guns including four smaller weapons on the quarterdeck, but the latter were not included in the ship's official establishment until 22 September 1756. The new ship had a round bow, a lion figurehead, three-light quarter galleries and six pairs of quarterdeck gunports.

Lyme was named on 2 August 1748, and commissioned in September 1748 under Captain Charles Proby, while still building in Deptford Dockyard under the direction of Master Shipwright John Holland. After her launch, she was fitted out there, finally sailing when completed on 8 February 1752. Her total initial cost had been £12,282.0.1d (including fitting out costs).

== Naval service ==
She sailed for the Mediterranean in May 1749. Returning home, she was fitted out at Portsmouth Dockyard from December 1750 to March 1751 (at a cost of £389.6.9d) for bearing the new ambassador to Tripoli out to the Mediterranean.

After her first commission finished in 1752, she was surveyed on 1 July 1753, and then underwent a small repair and was fitted out at Plymouth Dockyard (under Admiralty Order on 4 December 1753, for a total cost of £1,519.6.3d) in February to March 1754. She was recommissioned under Captain Samuel Faulkner, but some months later he was replaced by Captain Edward Vernon, under whom the Lyme joined the Western Squadron based in Plymouth. In March 1758 she was under Captain James Baker, in the Mediterranean to 1759.

Back home, and under Vernon's command again, she was surveyed again on 7 June 1760, and then underwent a small repair and was fitted out at Chatham Dockyard (for a total cost of £4,211.6.4d) in May to August 1760, before sailing for the Baltic.

== Sources ==
- Robert Gardiner, The First Frigates, Conway Maritime Press, London 1992. ISBN 0-85177-601-9.
- David Lyon, The Sailing Navy List, Conway Maritime Press, London 1993. ISBN 0-85177-617-5.
- Rif Winfield, British Warships in the Age of Sail, 1714 to 1792, Seaforth Publishing, London 2007. ISBN 978-1-84415-700-6.
