= List of ship launches in 1741 =

The list of ship launches in 1741 includes a chronological list of some ships launched in 1741.

| Date | Ship | Class | Builder | Location | Country | Notes |
|---|---|---|---|---|---|---|
| January | Auguste | Fourth rate | Jean Geoffroy | Brest | Kingdom of France | For French Navy. |
| January | Saint Michel | Saint Michel-class ship of the line | Jean-Marie Helie | Brest, France | Kingdom of France | For French Navy. |
| 19 February | Drake | Drake-class sloop | Thomas West | Wapping | Great Britain | For Royal Navy. |
| 20 February | Gosport | Fifth rate | Edward Snelgrove | Limehouse | Great Britain | For Royal Navy. |
| 21 February | Sapphire | Fifth rate | Robert Carter | Limehouse | Great Britain | For Royal Navy. |
| February | Médée | Frigate | | Brest | Kingdom of France | For French Navy. |
| 7 March | Hastings | Fifth rate | John Okill | Liverpool | Great Britain | For Royal Navy. |
| 7 March | Lynn | Fifth rate | Thomas West | Deptford Dockyard | Great Britain | For Royal Navy. |
| 10 March | Hawk | Drake-class sloop | Grevill & Whetstone | Limehouse | Great Britain | For Royal Navy. |
| 16 March | Atalante | Frégate-vaisseu de 2ème ordre (demi-batterie) | | Toulon | Kingdom of France | For French Navy. |
| 6 May | Elephanten | Ship of the line | Laurent Barbé | Nyholmen | Denmark–Norway | For Dano-Norwegian Navy. |
| 30 May | Swift | Drake-class sloop | Robert Carter | Limehouse | Great Britain | For Royal Navy. |
| 19 July | Liverpool | Fifth rate | John Okill | Liverpool | Great Britain | For Royal Navy. |
| 3 September | Saltash | Sloop-of-war | Henry Bird | Deptford | Great Britain | For Royal Navy. |
| 19 September | Greyhound | Sixth rate | Thomas Snelgrove | Limehouse | Great Britain | For Royal Navy. |
| 1 October | Adventure | Fifth rate | Hugh Blaydes | Hull | Great Britain | For Royal Navy. |
| 1 October | Chatham | Yacht | John Ward | Chatham Dockyard | Great Britain | For Royal Navy. |
| 13 October | Benjamin | East Indiaman | Robert Carter | Limehouse | Great Britain | For British East India Company. |
| 15 October | Sutherland | Fourth rate | Taylor | Rotherhithe | Great Britain | For Royal Navy. |
| 30 October | Leopard | Fourth rate | Perry | Blackwall Yard | Great Britain | For Royal Navy. |
| 13 November | Hampshire | Fourth rate | Barnard | Ipswich | Great Britain | For Royal Navy. |
| 27 November | Kinsale | Fifth rate | Henry Bird | Rotherhithe | Great Britain | For Royal Navy. |
| 22 December | Looe | Fifth rate | Thomas Snelgrove | Limehouse | Great Britain | For Royal Navy. |
| 29 December | Nonsuch | Fourth rate | Quallett | Rotherhithe | Great Britain | For Royal Navy. |
| Unknown date | Arend | Sixth rate | Charles Bentam | location | Dutch Republic | For Dutch Navy. |
| Unknown date | Cam's Delight | Coaster | | Fareham | Great Britain | For Ireland & Co. |
| Unknown date | Damiaten | Third rate | Charles Bentam | Amsterdam | Dutch Republic | For Dutch Navy. |
| Unknown date | Defence | Ketch | | Bombay | India | For British East India Company. |
| Unknown date | Edam | Fourth rate | Charles Bentam | Amsterdam | Dutch Republic | For Dutch Navy. |
| Unknown date | Michelle | Catboat | | Rochefort | Kingdom of France | For French Navy. |
| Unknown date | Mediator | Sloop | | Chesapeake Bay | Thirteen Colonies | |
| Unknown date | Porto Bello | Sloop | | Bombay | India | For Bengal Pilot Service. |
| Unknown date | Rotterdam | Third rate | | Rotterdam | Dutch Republic | For Dutch Navy. |
| Unknown date | San Antonio de Padua | Brig | | San Sebastián | Spain | For Spanish Navy. |
| Unknown date | Terror | Bomb vessel | | Limehouse | Great Britain | For Royal Navy. |
