= List of ship launches in 1742 =

The list of ship launches in 1742 includes a chronological list of some ships launched in 1742.

Date	Ship	Class	Builder	Location	Country	Notes
25 February	Mortar	Comet-class bomb vessel	Philemon Perry	Blackwall	Great Britain	For Royal Navy.
26 February	Firedrake	Comet-class bomb vessel	Philemon Perry	Blackwall	Great Britain	For Royal Navy.
27 February	Wolf	Wolf-class sloop	Thomas West	Deptford Dockyard	Great Britain	For Royal Navy.
15 March	Serpent	Comet-class bomb vessel	Thomas Snelgrove	Limehouse	Great Britain	For Royal Navy.
29 March	Comet	Comet-class bomb vessel	James Taylor	Rotherhithe	Great Britain	For Royal Navy.
29 March	Crown Yacht			Copenhagen	Denmark–Norway	For Dano-Norwegian Navy.
24 April	Stirling Castle	Third rate		Chatham Dockyard	Great Britain	For Royal Navy.
26 May	Medway	Fourth rate	Bird	Rotherhithe	Great Britain	For Royal Navy.
4 June	Canada	Sixth rate	René-Nicolas Levasseur	Quebec City	(Kingdom of France) New France	For French Navy.
22 June	Granado	Bomb vessel	John Barnard	Ipswich	Great Britain	For Royal Navy.
23 June	Dreadnought	Fourth rate	Wells	Deptford	Great Britain	For Royal Navy.
8 July	Lowestoffe	Sixth rate	John Buxton	Deptford	Great Britain	For Royal Navy.
20 July	Solebay	Sixth rate	Peirson Lock	Plymouth Dockyard	Great Britain	For Royal Navy.
13 August	Chasse	Galley	Augustino Scolaro	Toulon	Kingdom of France	For French Navy.
19 August	Otter	Wolf-class sloop	John Buxton	Rotherhithe	Great Britain	For Royal Navy.
5 September	Tre Kroner	Third rate		Copenhagen	Denmark–Norway	For Dano-Norwegian Navy.
5 September	Wenden	Third Rate		Copenhagen	Denmark–Norway	For Dano-Norwegian Navy.
13 September	Trident	Third rate	Joseph-Marie-Blaise Coulomb	Toulon	Kingdom of France	For French Navy.
2 October	Decouverte	Galley	Augustino Scolaro	Toulon	Kingdom of France	For French Navy.
3 November	Anglesea	Fifth rate	Hugh Blaydes	Hull	Great Britain	For Royal Navy.
30 December	Saltash	Baltimore-class sloop	John Quallett	Rotherhithe	Great Britain	For Royal Navy.
30 December	Baltimore	Baltimore-class sloop	Thomas Wes	Deptford Dockyard	Great Britain	For Royal Navy.
Unknown date	Bombay	Sloop		Bombay	India	For Bengal Pilot Service.
Unknown date	Edam	Fourth rate	Charles Bentam	Amsterdam	Dutch Republic	For Dutch Navy.
Unknown date	Falster	Fifth rate			Denmark–Norway	For Dano-Norwegian Navy.
Unknown date	Duchesse	Ferme-class galley	Pierre Chabert	Marseille	Kingdom of France	For French Navy.
Unknown date	Valeur	France-class Galley	Jean Reynoir	Marseille	Kingdom of France	For French Navy.
Unknown date	Leeuwenhorst	Fourth rate	Charles Bentam	Amsterdam	Dutch Republic	For Dutch Navy.
Unknown date	Portsmouth	Storeship	George Rowcliffe	Southampton	Great Britain	For Royal Navy.
Unknown date	Raaf	Sixth rate		Amsterdam	Dutch Republic	For Dutch Navy.
Unknown date	San Juan de Pomosana	Privateer		Barcelona	Spain	For private owner.
Unknown date	Success	Full-rigged ship		Bombay	India	For British East India Company.
Unknown date	Valkenburg	Sixth rate	Charles Bentam	Amsterdam	Dutch Republic	For Dutch Navy.
