= List of shipwrecks in 1748 =

The List of shipwrecks in 1748 includes some ships sunk, wrecked or otherwise lost during 1748.

table of contents
1748
Jan	Feb	Mar	Apr
May	Jun	Jul	Aug
Sep	Oct	Nov	Dec
Unknown date

== Early 1748 (N.S.) ==
Prior to 1752, when the Calendar Act set 1 January as the beginning of the New Year in the British Empire, Britain and its colonies observed the first day of the new year on 25 March. For those wrecks that happened in what would now be considered January, February and March 1748 under the calendar system used all over the world, bur which was considered January, February and March of "1747" on the archaic calendar, please refer to their unusual placement in the latter sections of the article List of shipwrecks in 1747.

== April ==
1748 did not begin on 1 January!^{[Note 1]} (except in non-British nations such as Spain, Portugal, France, Poland, Italy, where 1748 began on 1 January. Under the old system abandoned by Britain more than 275 years ago, the year 1748 officially began on 25 March.

=== Unknown date ===
List of shipwrecks: Unknown date 1748
Ship	State	Description
Prophet Jonah	Great Britain	The ship was wrecked on the Goodwin Sands, Kent, before 29 April. She was on a voyage from a Norwegian port to Falmouth, Cornwall.
Providence	Great Britain	The ship was driven ashore near Rye, Sussex, before 15 April. She was on a voyage from Milford Haven Pembrokeshire to Sunderland, County Durham.

== May ==
=== 18 May ===
List of shipwrecks: 18 May 1748
Ship	State	Description
Simeon and Anne	Great Britain	The snow foundered. Her crew were rescued. She was on a voyage from Bristol, Gloucestershire, to Barbados.

=== 27 May ===
List of shipwrecks: 27 May 1748
Ship	State	Description
Bucephalus	Great Britain	The ship was driven ashore and wrecked at Arklow, County Wicklow, Ireland. She was on a voyage from Limington, Hampshire, to Dublin, Ireland.

=== Unknown date ===
List of shipwrecks: Unknown date 1748
Ship	State	Description
Duke of Cumberland	Great Britain	The ship capsized at Boston, Lincolnshire, before 10 May.

== June ==
=== 26 June ===
List of shipwrecks: 26 June 1748
Ship	State	Description
HMS Fowey	(Kingdom of Great Britain) Royal Navy	The fifth rate struck a reef off the coast of Spanish Florida and was wrecked. Her crew were rescued by two British merchant ships and San Juan y Tadicos (Spain), which she had previously captured.

== July ==
=== 24 July ===
List of shipwrecks: 24 July 1748
Ship	State	Description
Lagniticus	France	The ship was driven ashore and wrecked near Lyme, Dorset, Great Britain. She was on a voyage from Bordeaux, Gironde, to Havre de Grâce, Seine-Maritime.

== August ==
=== Unknown date ===
List of shipwrecks: Unknown date 1748
Ship	State	Description
Mary	Great Britain	The ship was driven ashore and damaged near Brownsey, Dorset, before 9 August. She had been refloated by 12 August.

== September ==
=== 14 September ===
List of shipwrecks: 14 September 1748
Ship	State	Description
Anna Maria & Santa Feliz	Spain	The ship was captured by a squadron under the command of Admiral Knowles and was sunk. She was on a voyage from Carthagena, Viceroyalty of Peru to Cádiz.

=== Unknown date ===
List of shipwrecks: Unknown date 1748
Ship	State	Description
Fortune	Ireland	The ship was wrecked on the Maiden Rocks, in the Irish Sea before 6 September. She was on a voyage from Londonderry to Dublin.

== October ==
=== 11 October ===
List of shipwrecks: 11 October 1748
Ship	State	Description
Exeter	Great Britain	The ship was driven ashore at Livorno, Grand Duchy of Tuscany. She was on a voyage from Livorno to London.
Russell	Great Britain	The ship struck a submerged wreck off Cape St. Vincent, Portugal. She foundered the next day. Her crew were rescued. She was on a voyage from Shoreham-by-Sea, Sussex, to Marseille, Bouches-du-Rhône, France.

=== 24 October ===
List of shipwrecks: 24 October 1748
Ship	State	Description
Okhotsk (Охотск)	Imperial Russian Navy	The galiot was driven ashore and wrecked at the mouth of the Bolshaya with the loss of most of her crew. She was on a voyage from Okhotsk to Kamchatka.

=== 25 October ===
List of shipwrecks: 25 October 1748
Ship	State	Description
Katharina	Denmark or Dutch Republic	The ship was driven ashore dismasted and crewless at Birsay, Orkney Islands, Great Britain.

=== Unknown date ===
List of shipwrecks: Unknown date 1748
Ship	State	Description
Africa	Spanish Navy	War of Jenkins' Ear, Battle of Havana: The ship was set afire and scuttled at Havana, Cuba, to prevent her being captured by the British.
Friendship	Ireland	The ship was driven ashore on the coast of West Flanders, Dutch Republic before 25 October. She was on a voyage from Dublin to Rotterdam, South Holland, Dutch Republic.
Serpent's Prize	Great Britain	The ship was lost off Red Car, Yorkshire, before 4 October. She was on a voyage from Leith, Lothian, to Camp Veer, Zeeland, Dutch Republic.

== November ==
=== Unknown date ===
List of shipwrecks: Unknown date 1748
Ship	State	Description
Martin and Louisa	Ireland	The ship was driven ashore and wrecked on Zeeland, Dutch Republic before 6 December. She was on a voyage from a Norwegian port to Dublin.
Nancy	Great Britain	The ship was wrecked on the Goodwin Sands, Kent, before 15 November. Her crew were rescued. She was on a voyage from Great Yarmouth, Norfolk, to Livorno, Grand Duchy of Tuscany.
True Love	Great Britain	The ship was lost on the "Dragoneer", near Copenhagen, Denmark, before 25 November. She was on a voyage from a Baltic port to London.
Two Brothers	Ireland	The ship was driven ashore and wrecked on the coast of Zeeland before 6 December. She was on a voyage from a Norwegian port to Dublin.

== December ==
=== 1 December ===
List of shipwrecks: 1 December 1748
Ship	State	Description
Elizabeth	(Kingdom of Great Britain) British America	The ship departed from the Virginia Capes for Madeira, Portugal. No further trace, presumed foundered in the Atlantic Ocean with the loss of all hands.

=== 8 December ===
List of shipwrecks: 8 December 1748
Ship	State	Description
Dolly	Great Britain	The snow was driven ashore and wrecked at Welch Hook, Pembrokeshire, with the loss of all hands.

=== 14 December ===
List of shipwrecks: 14 December 1748
Ship	State	Description
Mercury	Great Britain	The ship foundered off the "Groyne". Her crew were rescued. She was on a voyage from London to Venice.

=== 17 December ===
List of shipwrecks: 17 December 1748
Ship	State	Description
Fame	Ireland	The ship was lost near Killybegs, County Donegal. Her crew were rescued. She was on a voyage from New York, British America, to Dublin.

=== 26 December ===
List of shipwrecks: 26 December 1748
Ship	State	Description
Young Elizabeth	(Kingdom of Great Britain) British America	The ship was driven ashore at Portland, Dorset, Great Britain. Her crew were rescued.

=== 31 December ===
List of shipwrecks: 31 December 1748
Ship	State	Description
HMS Wolf	Royal Navy	The Wolf-class sloop was wrecked in Dundrum Bay with the loss of all 110 crew.

=== Unknown date ===
List of shipwrecks: Unknown date 1748
Ship	State	Description
Basnet	Great Britain	The ship was lost off Sandwich, Kent before 20 December. She was on a voyage from London to Marseille, Bouches-du-Rhône, France.
Elizabeth	Great Britain	The ship was driven ashore near Ramsgate, Kent, before 20 December. She was on a voyage from London to La Rochelle, Charente-Maritime, France.
Griffin	Great Britain	The ship was driven ashore and wrecked near Caernarfon before 13 December. Her crew were rescued. She was on a voyage from Virginia, British America, to Whitehaven, Cumberland.
Industry	Great Britain	The ship was driven ashore near Sandwich before 20 December. She was on a voyage from Virginia to London.
John & James	Great Britain	The ship was driven ashore near Sandwich before 20 December. She was on a voyage from London to Marseille.
Margaret and Anne	Great Britain	The ship was driven ashore and damaged near Sandwich before 20 December. She was on a voyage from London to Marseille. Margaret and Anne was later refloated.
Pretty Betsey	Great Britain	The ship was driven ashore near Ramsgate before 20 December. She was on a voyage from London to the Strait of Gibraltar. Pretty Betsey was later refloated and taken in to Ramsgate.
Stephen & Sarah	Great Britain	The ship was driven ashore near Ramsgate before 20 December. She was later refloated and taken in to Ramsgate.
St. George	Great Britain	The ship was lost near Folkston, Kent, before 20 December. She was on a voyage from London to the Strait of Gibraltar.
Stobb's Galley	Great Britain	The ship was lost off Sandwich before 20 March. She was on a voyage from London to Marseille.
Supply	Great Britain	The ship was driven ashore near Ramsgate before 20 December. She was later refloated and taken in to Ramsgate.

== January ==
=== 5 January ===
List of shipwrecks: 5 January 1748
Ship	State	Description
Provident	Great Britain	The ship foundered in the Irish Sea off Holyhead, Anglesey, with the loss of all hands. She was on a voyage from Maryland, British America, to Whitehaven, Cumberland.

=== 14 January ===
List of shipwrecks: 14 January 1748
Ship	State	Description
Bridge Town	Great Britain	The ship foundered in the English Channel off Dieppe, Seine-Maritime, France. She was on a voyage from London to Bordeaux, Gironde, France.

=== 16 January ===
List of shipwrecks: 16 January 1748
Ship	State	Description
Hope	Dutch Republic	The ship was driven ashore and wrecked at Portland, Dorset, Great Britain. Her crew were rescued. She was on a voyage from British America to Amsterdam, North Holland.

=== 17 January ===
List of shipwrecks: 17 January 1748
Ship	State	Description
John	Ireland	The ship was driven ashore on the South bull, Dublin. She was on a voyage from Cádiz, Spain, to Dublin.
John & Francis	Ireland	The ship was driven ashore and wrecked on the South Bull, Dublin. She was on a voyage from Dublin to La Rochelle, Charente-Maritime, France.
St John Baptist	Ireland	The ship was driven ashore and wrecked on the South Bull, Dublin. She was on a voyage from Dublin to Cádiz.
Tyger	Ireland	The ship was driven ashore on the South Bull, Dublin. She was on a voyage from Lisbon, Portugal, to Dublin.
Union	Ireland	The ship was driven ashore and wrecked on the South Bull, Dublin. She was on a voyage from Dublin to Livorno, Grand Duchy of Tuscany.

=== 27 January ===
List of shipwrecks: 27 January 1748
Ship	State	Description
Laura	Great Britain	The convict ship was driven ashore and wrecked near Walmer Castle, Kent, with the loss of up to 99 lives. She was on a voyage from London to Maryland, British America.

=== Unknown date ===
List of shipwrecks: Unknown date 1748
Ship	State	Description
HMS Anson	(Kingdom of Great Britain) Royal Navy	The fourth rate ship of the line was driven ashore at Portsmouth, Hampshire, before 13 January. She was later refloated and returned to service.
Arent & Elizabeth	Dutch Republic	The ship was driven ashore near Rye, Sussex, Great Britain, before 17 January. She was on a voyage from Livorno, Grand Duchy of Tuscany, to a Dutch port.
Cumberland	Great Britain	The ship was driven ashore near Carmarthen before 13 January with the loss of all but one of her crew. She was on a voyage from Virginia, British America, to London.
Greenock	Great Britain	The ship foundered in the North Sea off Fraserburgh, Aberdeenshire. Her crew were rescued. She was on a voyage from Virginia to Leith, Lothian.
Happy Return	Great Britain	The ship foundered in the English Channel off Beachy Head, Sussex, before 20 January. Her crew were rescued by a Dutch vessel. She was on a voyage from London to Vannes, Morbihan, France.
Mary	Great Britain	The ship foundered in the Irish Sea off Waterford, Ireland before 17 January. Her crew were rescued. She was on a voyage from Swansey, Glamorgan, to London.
Marygold	Great Britain	The ship was driven ashore on Texel, North Holland, Dutch Republic before 3 February. She was on a voyage from London to Rotterdam, South Holland, Dutch Republic.
Neptune	Great Britain	The ship was lost on the Hoyle Bank, in Liverpool Bay before 24 January with the loss of all on board, over 100 lives. She was on a voyage from Chester, Cheshire, to Dublin, Ireland.
Page	Great Britain	The sloop was wrecked on the Dutch coast before 31 January. She was on a voyage from London to Rotterdam.
Providence	France	The ship was lost off Dover, Kent, Great Britain, before 13 January. She was on a voyage from Dunkirk, Nord to Bordeaux, Gironde.
Rose	Great Britain	The ship foundered in the Irish Sea off the Welsh coast before 20 January. Her crew were rescued. She was on a voyage from Liverpool, Lancashire, to Jamaica.
Santa Domingo	Spain	The ship was driven ashore and wrecked in Bigbury Bay, Devon, Great Britain, before 10 January. She was on a voyage from Bilbao to Havre de Grâce, Seine-Maritime, France.
Success	Great Britain	The ship was wrecked on St. John's Point, County Donegal, Ireland, before 13 January. Only one passenger survived. She was on a voyage from Plimouth, Devon, to Dublin, Ireland.
Thetis	Great Britain	The ship was driven ashore and wrecked near Padstow, Cornwall, with the loss of all hands. She was on a voyage from Málaga, Spain, to an English port.
Ufro Rebeccah	Hamburg	The ship was driven ashore and wrecked near Folkestone, Kent, before 20 January. She was on a voyage from Hamburg to Lisbon, Portugal.
HMS Wolf	(Kingdom of Great Britain) Royal Navy	The sloop of war was lost near Belfast, County Down, Ireland, before 13 January with the loss of 58 of her crew.

== February ==
=== 1 February ===
List of shipwrecks: 1 February 1748
Ship	State	Description
Heureuse Paix	France	The ship was lost neat Otterton, Devon, Great Britain, with the loss of 40 of her 48 crew. She was on a voyage from Bordeaux, Gironde, to Île-Royale.

=== 22 February ===
List of shipwrecks: 22 February 1748
Ship	State	Description
Halsy and Suttle	Great Britain	The ship was destroyed by fire at the North Dock, Liverpool, Lancashire.

=== Unknown date ===
List of shipwrecks: Unknown date 1748
Ship	State	Description
Concord	Great Britain	The transport ship was driven ashore on the French coast before 17 February. She was later refloated and taken in to Havre de Grâce, Seine Maritime.
Friendship	Great Britain	The transport ship was driven ashore on the French coast before 7 February. She was on a voyage from The Downs to an Irish port.
Friendship	Great Britain	The ship was driven ashore at Caen, Calvados, France, before 7 February. She was on a voyage from London to South Carolina, British America.
Hope	Ireland	The ship was driven ashore and wrecked on the North Bull, Dublin before 21 February. She was on a voyage from Dublin to the West Indies.
Humble	Great Britain	The ship was driven ashore on the French coast before 14 February. She was on a voyage from Sandwich, Kent, to the Straits of Gibraltar.
Jonge Prinses Carolina	Dutch Republic	The ship was wrecked on the Goodwin Sands, Kent, Great Britain, before 7 February with the loss of all hands.
Lavante	Dutch Republic	The galley was wrecked on the Goodwin Sands with the loss of all hands. She was on a voyage from Amsterdam, North Holland, to Curaçao.
Mary	Great Britain	The ship was driven ashore and wrecked on the coast of Lincolnshire before 7 February. She was on a voyage from Hamburg to London.
Nostra Señora de la Paz	Great Britain	The ship was lost at Bilbao before 27 February. She was on a voyage from Amsterdam to Bilbao.
Prince of Wales	Great Britain	The transport ship was driven ashore on the French coast before 7 February. She was on a voyage from The Downs to an Irish port. She was later refloated and taken in to Portsmouth, Hampshire.
Rachel	Great Britain	The ship was driven ashore at Bayonne, Pyrénées-Atlantiques, France before 17 February. She was on a voyage from London to Bayonne.
Robert and Mary	Great Britain	The transport ship was driven ashore on the French coast before 7 February. She was on a voyage from The Downs to an Irish port.
Seaflower	(Kingdom of Great Britain) Jersey	The ship sank in the Bordeaux River before 27 February. She was on a voyage from Bordeaux to Jersey.

== March ==
=== Unknown date ===
List of shipwrecks: Unknown date 1748
Ship	State	Description
St. George	Great Britain	The snow was lost at Newhaven, Sussex, before 14 March. She was on a voyage from London to Marseille, Bouches-du-Rhône, France.

== Unknown date ==
List of shipwrecks: Unknown date 1748
Ship	State	Description
Betsey	Great Britain	The ship foundered before 7 June. She was on a voyage from Jamaica to Boston.
Blendon	Great Britain	The ship foundered in the Grand Banks of Newfoundland before 1 November. She was on a voyage from Lisbon, Portugal, to Newfoundland, British America.
Boss	Great Britain	The ship was captured and sunk by a French Man-of-war before 16 August. She was on a voyage from Liverpool, Lancashire, to New York, British America.
Cessation	Great Britain	The ship foundered before 30 December. She was on a voyage from New England, British America, to Barbados.
Charming Sally	Ireland	The ship foundered in the Atlantic Ocean 24 leagues (72 nautical miles (133 km) off the Virginia Capes, British America, before 3 June. Her crew were rescued by Spencer (Great Britain). Charming Sally was on a voyage from Philadelphia, Pennsylvania, to Newry, County Down.
Dragon	Great Britain	The ship foundered in Saint Ann's Bay, Jamaica, before 25 November. She was on a voyage from Jamaica to London.
Elizabeth	Great Britain	The brig foundered before 28 June. She was on a voyage from Antigua to Montserrat.
Expedition	Great Britain	The ship, sailing under a flag of truce, foundered before 19 April. She was on a voyage from Jamaica to Veracruz, Captaincy General of Cuba.
Happy Success	Great Britain	The ship was lost off Port Antonio, Jamaica, before 25 October. She was on a voyage from Jamaica to London.
Industry	Great Britain	The ship was lost at Port Morant, Jamaica, before 17 January. She was on a voyage from Boston, Massachusetts, British America, to Jamaica.
Leostoffe	Great Britain	The ship was lost at Bermuda before 17 March. She was on a voyage from Jamaica to Bermuda.
Matthew	Great Britain	The ship was lost on the coast of British America before 19 April. She was on a voyage from Lisbon, Portugal, to Virginia, British America.
Montserrat Packet	Great Britain	The ship was lost at Calabar, Africa, before 14 March.
Nelly	Great Britain	The ship was wrecked on a reef off Hispaniola before 4 October. She was on a voyage from the Clyde to Jamaica.
President	Great Britain	The ship sank in the James River, Virginia, British America, before 8 July.
Rachel	(Kingdom of Great Britain) British America	The ship was lost at Livorno, Grand Duchy of Tuscany, before 24 February. She was on a voyage from Newfoundland to Livorno.
Rae	Great Britain	The ship was lost on the coast of America before 3 May. She was on a voyage from Glasgow, Renfrewshire, to Virginia.
Regina	Dutch Republic	The ship was driven ashore and wrecked near Málaga, Spain, before 24 May. She was on a voyage from Cette, Hérault, France, to a Dutch port.
HMS Serpent	(Kingdom of Great Britain) Royal Navy	The sloop of war was wrecked off Barbados before 22 November with the loss of seven of her crew.
Tryal	Ireland	The ship ran aground off Antigua before 26 August. She was on a voyage from Dublin to Barbados.
Victoria	flag unknown	The ship was lost off Gallipoli, Ottoman Empire, before 27 February. She was on a voyage from "Tripany" to Venice.
Willoughby	Great Britain	The ship foundered in the Atlantic Ocean before 21 June. Her crew were rescued by George (Great Britain). Willoughby was on a voyage from Jamaica to Liverpool, Lancashire.

== Notes ==
1. Until 1752, the year began on Lady Day (25 March) Thus 24 March 1747 was followed by 25 March 1748. 31 December 1748 was followed by 1 January 1748.
