= List of ship launches in 1743 =

The list of ship launches in 1743 includes a chronological list of some ships launched in 1743.

Date	Ship	Class	Builder	Location	Country	Notes
15 January	Torrington	Fifth rate	George Rowcliffe	Northam	Great Britain	For Royal Navy.
18 February	Chester	Fourth rate	Wells & Bronsdon	Deptford	Great Britain	For Royal Navy.
16 March	Aldborough	Sixth rate	John Orkill	Liverpool	Great Britain	For Royal Navy.
18 March	Alderney	Sixth rate	John Reed	Hull	Great Britain	For Royal Navy.
14 April	Captain	Third rate	Thomas Holland	Woolwich Dockyard	Great Britain	For Royal Navy.
17 April	St. Paul	Ship of the line		Saint Petersburg	Russia	For Imperial Russian Navy.
27 April	Le Saint Louis	Saint Louis-class East Indiaman	Gilles Cambry	Lorient	Kingdom of France	For Compagnie des Indes.
10 May	Ferret	Sloop-of-war	Henry Bird	Deptford	Great Britain	For Royal Navy.
25 May	Reyna	Reyna-class ship of the line	Juan de Acosta	Havana	(Spain) Cuba	For Spanish Navy.
8 June	Hirondelle	Barques latines	Augustino Scolaro	Toulon	Kingdom of France	For French Navy.
11 June	Cervo d'Oro	Fifth rate	Andrea Gallina	Venice	Republic of Venice	For Venetian Navy.
13 June	Berwick	Third rate		Deptford Dockyard	Great Britain	For Royal Navy.
28 June	Lapwing	Packet ship	Thomas Bronsdon	Deptford	Great Britain	For British East India Company.
27 July	Grampus	Wolf-class sloop	Philemon Perry	Blackwall	Great Britain	For Royal Navy.
27 July	Phoenix	Sixth rate	John Greaves	Limehouse	Great Britain	For Royal Navy.
July	Brilliant	Brigantine		Bombay	India	For a private owner in Madras.
28 September	Drake	Baltimore-class sloop	John Buxton	Deptford Dockyard	Great Britain	For Royal Navy.
8 October	Sheerness	Sixth rate	John Buxton Sr.	Rotherhithe	Great Britain	For Royal Navy.
24 October	Hector	Fifth rate		Hull	Great Britain	For Royal Navy.
15 November	Tonnant	Ship of the line		Toulon	Kingdom of France	For French Navy.
5 December	Dennis	Lighter	Daniel Baker	Plymouth Dockyard	Great Britain	For Royal Navy.
6 December	Alcide	Third rate		Brest	Kingdom of France	For French Navy.
19 December	Invencible	Reyna-class ship of the line	Ciprián Autrán	Havana	(Spain) Cuba	For Spanish Navy.
21 December	Roebuck	Fifth rate			Great Britain	For Royal Navy.
22 December	Harwich	Fourth rate	Barnard	Harwich	Great Britain	For Royal Navy.
Unknown date	Stafford	East Indiaman			Great Britain	For British East India Company.
