= Bonetta group sloop =

Class overview
- Operators: Royal Navy
- Preceded by: Grampus class
- Succeeded by: Drake class
- Built: 1732
- In commission: 1732–1751
- Completed: 8
- Lost: 2
- Retired: 6

General characteristics (common specification)
- Type: Sloop-of-war
- Tons burthen: 200 bm
- Length: (see individual vessels)
- Beam: (see individual vessels)
- Depth of hold: (see individual vessels)
- Sail plan: Snow
- Complement: 80
- Armament: 8 × 3-pounder or 4-pounder guns; also 12 x ½-pounder swivel guns

The Bonetta group was a batch of eight 200-ton sloops of wooden construction built for the Royal Navy during 1732. They followed on two previous sloops - the Grampus and the larger Wolf - built a year earlier. Seven were ordered on 4 May 1732 to a common specification prepared by Jacob Acworth, the Surveyor of the Navy. An additional vessel – Trial (which had been ordered on 16 November 1731, but suspended on 7 January 1732) – was re-ordered on 6 July to be built to the same specification. The actual individual design was left up to the Master Shipwright in each Royal Dockyard at which they were built (except for Hound and Trial, which were built by Deptford's Master Shipwright – Richard Stacey – but were to a design by Jacob Acworth). All the draughts were approved by the Navy Board on 28 June 1732.

Although fitted with snow rigs and initially armed with eight 3-pounder guns (except Shark which was rigged as a ketch and fitted with eight 4-pounders), this group was built with seven pairs of gunports on the upper deck (each port flanked by two pairs of row-ports).

== Vessels ==
Name	Laid down	Dockyard	Launched	Completed	First cost (including fitting out)	Fate
Shark	4 July 1732	Portsmouth Dockyard	7 September 1732	23 September 1732	£2,887.6.10d	Sold 2 December 1755 at Deptford Dockyard.
Bonetta	5 July 1732	Woolwich Dockyard	24 August 1732	1 September 1732	£2,728.1.2d	Wrecked 20 October 1746 off Jamaica.
Fly	7 July 1732	Sheerness Dockyard	15 September 1732	18 October 1732	£2,600.17.6d	Taken to pieces 11 February 1751 at Sheerness Dockyard
Spy	10 July 1732	Chatham Dockyard	25 August 1732	9 September 1732	£2,777.3.1d	Sold 25 April 1745 at Portsmouth Dockyard.
Saltash	10 July 1732	Plymouth Dockyard	7 September 1732	31 October 1732	£2,705.3.10d	Sold 22 October 1741 at Plymouth Dockyard
Cruizer	11 July 1732	Deptford Dockyard	6 September 1732	23 September 1732	£2,663.5.53/4d	Sold 22 January 1745 at Deptford Dockyard.
Hound	11 July 1732	Deptford Dockyard	6 September 1732	18 September 1732	£2,690.16.4d	Taken to pieces June 1745 at Deptford Dockyard.
Trial	11 July 1732	Deptford Dockyard	6 September 1732	29 September 1732	£2,583.10.21/4d	Scuttled as unserviceable on 4 October 1741 off Valparaíso.

The following is a list of the dimensions and tonnages of the individual vessels:

Name	Designer	Length (gundeck)	Length (keel)	Beam	Depth in hold	Burthen tonnage
Shark	Joseph Allin	80 ft 0 in (24.4 m)	63 ft 0 in (19.2 m)	24 ft 6 in (7.5 m)	9 ft 11.25 in (3.0 m)	201 13/94 bm
Bonetta	John Hayward	81 ft 4 in (24.8 m)	65 ft 6 in (20.0 m)	24 ft 0 in (7.3 m)	10 ft 0 in (3.0 m)	200 64/94 bm
Fly	John Ward	86 ft 6 in (26.4 m)	69 ft 7 in (21.2 m)	23 ft 3 in (7.1 m)	10 ft 6 in (3.2 m)	200 3/94 bm
Spy	Benjamin Rosewell	85 ft 7 in (26.1 m)	69 ft 5 in (21.2 m)	23 ft 4 in (7.1 m)	10 ft 6 in (3.2 m)	200 91/94 bm
Saltash	Peirson Lock	85 ft 7 in (26.1 m)	69 ft 1.5 in (21.1 m)	23 ft 4 in (7.1 m)	9 ft 6 in (2.9 m)	200 17/94 bm
Cruizer	Richard Stacey	87 ft 6 in (26.7 m)	71 ft 1 in (21.7 m)	23 ft 0 in (7.0 m)	9 ft 5 in (2.9 m)	200 1/94 bm
Hound	Jacob Acworth	84 ft 0 in (25.6 m)	68 ft 1 in (20.8 m)	23 ft 6 in (7.2 m)	9 ft 6 in (2.9 m)	200 (exact) bm
Trial	Jacob Acworth	84 ft 0 in (25.6 m)	68 ft 1 in (20.8 m)	23 ft 6 in (7.2 m)	9 ft 6 in (2.9 m)	200 (exact) bm
