= HMS Wolf (1742) =

Royal Navy sloop

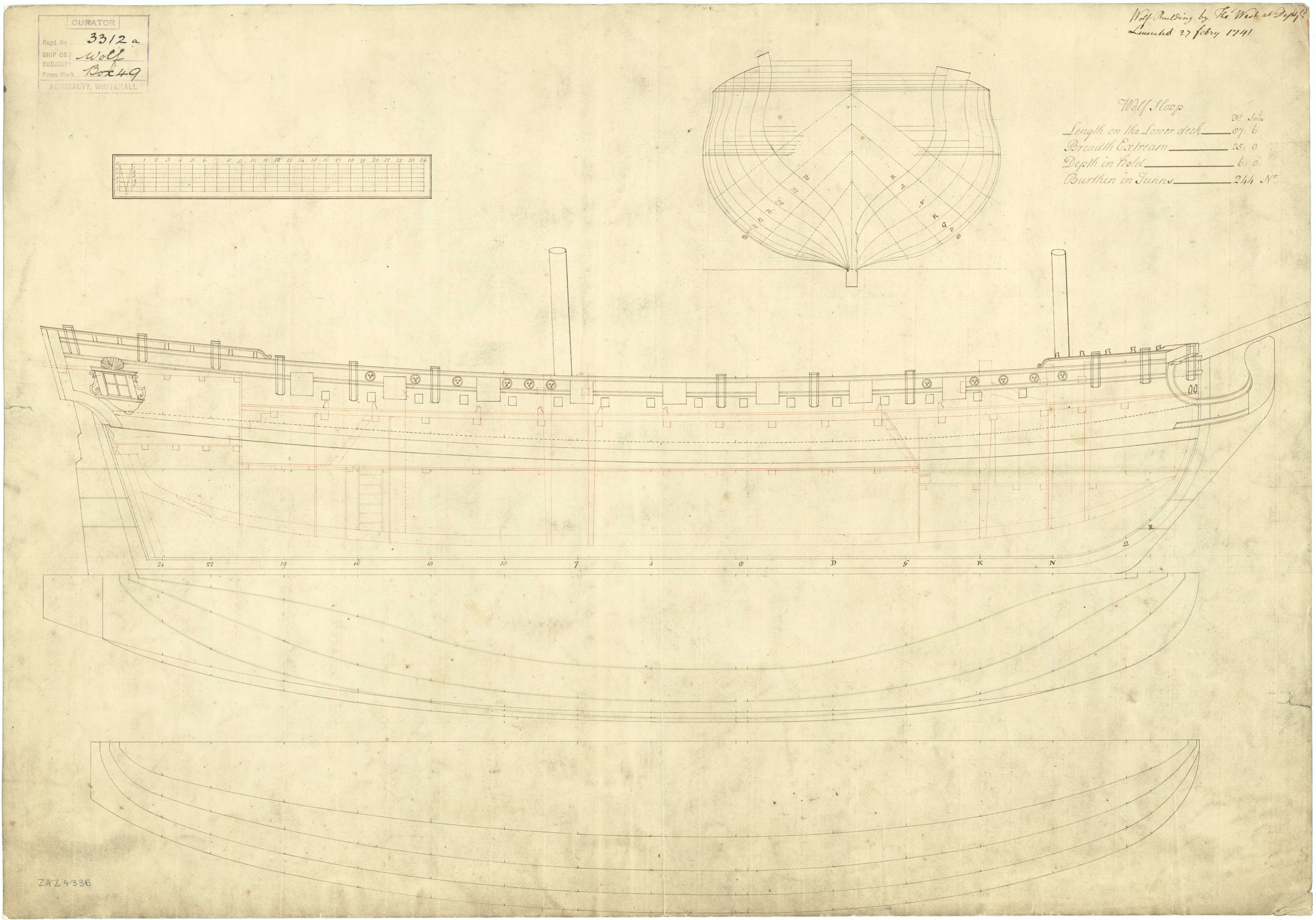
- Drawing showing the body plan, sheer lines with inboard detail, and longitudinal half-breadth for the Wolf, 1741

History

Great Britain
- Name: HMS Wolf
- Ordered: 21 July 1741
- Builder: Thomas West, Deptford
- Laid down: 31 July 1741
- Launched: 27 February 1742
- Completed: 15 April 1741 at Deptford Dockyard
- Commissioned: February 1742
- Out of service: 29 October 1745
- Reinstated: July 1747
- Fate: Wrecked in Dundrum Bay, 31 December 1748

General characteristics
- Class & type: 14-gun Wolf-class sloop-of-war
- Tons burthen: 246 25/94 (bm)
- Length: 89 ft 6 in (27.3 m) (gundeck) (Note: the designed length was 87ft 6in, but on handing over she was measured as being 2ft longer.); 73 ft 0.5 in (22.3 m) (keel)
- Beam: 25 ft 2.125 in (7.7 m)
- Draught: 10 ft 6 in (3.2 m)
- Propulsion: Sails
- Sail plan: snow-rigged
- Complement: 110
- Armament: 14 × 4-pdrs; 12 × 1/2-pdr swivels

HMS Wolf was a 14-gun snow-rigged sloop of the Royal Navy, launched in 1742 as the first of three Wolf-class sloops constructed for action against Spanish privateers during the War of Jenkins' Ear.

== Construction ==
Wolf was the first of three small, fast vessels built for coastal patrol and Atlantic service and designated by the British Admiralty as the Wolf class. (Note: Other Wolf-class vessels were HMS Otter and HMS Grampus) Her design was similar to that of the preceding Drake-class sloops but larger and more heavily armed. Construction was contracted to civilian shipwright Thomas West, who had overseen construction of HMS Drake a year earlier.

As designed, Wolf's dimensions were in keeping with other vessels of her class with an overall length of 87 ft 6 in (26.7 m), a beam of 25 ft 2 in (7.7 m) and measuring 243 74/94 tons burthen. She had two masts, square-rigged and supported by a trysail mast aft of the main mast. Two decks were fitted instead of one, reflecting the design of her predecessor, the 1731 HMS Wolf. Constructed with eight pairs of gunports, she was initially supplied with fourteen four-pounder cannons in addition to twelve deck-mounted half-pounder swivel guns.

Construction took seven months from the laying of the keel in July 1741 to launch in February 1742, at a building cost of £1,793.8.0d (at a contract price of £7.7.0d per burthen ton), plus an additional £1,653.12.2d for fitting out.

== Naval career ==
Wolf was commissioned into the Navy at Deptford Dockyard in early February 1742 and launched at the end of that month under the command of Lieutenant Samuel Loftin. Internal fitout continued until April, after which Wolf was sailed to Svalbard as convoy protection for the English whaling fleet.

=== Privateer hunter ===
At the end of the whaling season Wolf returned south to join the blockade of Spanish ports established as part of the War of Jenkins' Ear. On 11 December 1742 Wolf overhauled and captured a Spanish privateer, Nuestra Señora del Pilar y Animas. Two more privateers were captured in March 1743; the San Pedro y Animas on 5 March, and the Nuestra Señora de la Esclavitud on the 17th.

Lieutenant Loftin left the vessel in late 1743 and was replaced by Commander Richard Haddock in January of the following year. Wolf's success in privateer hunting continued, with the capture of Spanish ships La Notre Dame de Boulogne on 30 June 1744, and La Palme on 30 July. In September Haddock was replaced by Commander (later Admiral) Augustus Keppel, who had recently returned to England after taking part in George Anson's voyage around the world. Keppel vacated his command three months later in favour of Lieutenant Thomas Stanhope, under whose authority Wolf was removed from Spanish patrol and reassigned to the English Channel.

=== Capture and recapture ===
Stanhope was replaced in July 1745 by Commander John Hughes, with Wolf remaining at her previous post in the English Channel. On 29 October 1745 she was on patrol off the Channel Islands when she encountered and was defeated by a 32-gun French privateer. Commander Hughes and two other English sailors were killed in the battle, and three more were wounded. The outgunned Wolf was then surrendered to the French, who converted her for privateering and renamed her La Loup.

Wolf's French service was cut short four months later, when on 1 March 1746 she was run down and retaken by the Royal Navy frigates Amazon and Grand Turk. The battered sloop was returned to Plymouth as a prize. After a year in port she was repurchased by Admiralty on 6 March 1747 and transferred to Plymouth Dockyard for repair. A five month refit was completed at a total cost of £1,887, slightly more than her original construction cost in 1742.

=== Relaunch and wreck ===
The rebuilt Wolf was commissioned in July 1747 under Commander George Vachel, and relaunched in August for service against the French in what was now the War of the Austrian Succession. The following year was spent on patrol duties in the North Sea and off the Irish coast. On 31 December 1748 Wolf was caught in heavy seas and driven towards the Irish shore. Despite efforts by her crew she was wrecked in the bay below Dundrum Castle and sank with the loss of all on board.
