= HMS Grampus (1743) =

Sloop of the Royal Navy

History

Great Britain
- Name: HMS Grampus
- Ordered: 5 February 1743
- Builder: Philemon Perry, Blackwall Yard
- Laid down: 15 February 1743
- Launched: 27 July 1743
- Completed: 8 September at Woolwich Dockyard
- Commissioned: July 1743
- In service: September 1743
- Out of service: 30 September 1744
- Reinstated: July 1747
- Fate: Captured by the French, Bay of Biscay, 1744

General characteristics
- Class & type: 14-gun Wolf-class sloop-of-war
- Tons burthen: 249 17/94 (bm)
- Length: 87 ft 10 in (26.8 m) (gundeck); 74 ft 4 in (22.7 m) (keel)
- Beam: 25 ft 1.25 in (7.7 m)
- Draught: 11 ft 0 in (3.4 m)
- Propulsion: Sails
- Sail plan: snow-rigged
- Complement: 110
- Armament: 14 × 4-pdrs; 12 × 1/2-pdr swivels

HMS Grampus was a 14-gun snow-rigged sloop of the Royal Navy, launched in 1743 as the last of three Wolf-class sloops constructed for action against French and Spanish privateers during the War of Jenkins' Ear.

== Construction ==
Grampus was the last of three small, fast vessels built for coastal patrol and privateer-hunting and designated by the British Admiralty as the Wolf class. (Note: Other Wolf-class vessels were HMS Otter and HMS Wolf) Her design was similar to that of the preceding Drake-class sloops but larger and more heavily armed. Construction was contracted to civilian shipwright Philemon Perry.

As designed, Grampus's dimensions were in keeping with other vessels of her class with an overall length of 87 ft 10 in (26.8 m), a beam of 25 ft 1.25 in (7.7 m) and measuring 249 17/94 tons burthen. She had two masts, square-rigged and supported by a trysail mast aft of the main mast. Two decks were fitted instead of one, reflecting the design of her predecessor, the 1731 HMS Wolf. Constructed with eight pairs of gunports, she was supplied with fourteen four-pounder cannons in addition to twelve deck-mounted half-pounder swivel guns.

Construction took five months from the laying of the keel in February 1743 to launch in July of the same year, at a fixed building cost of £1,793.8.0d based on a contract price of £7.7.0d per ton burthen, plus an additional £1,838.13.10d for fitting out.

== Naval career ==
Grampus was commissioned into the Navy at Woolwich Dockyard in July 1743 under Commander Richard Collins, in the later stages of the War of Jenkins' Ear against France and Spain. Internal fitout continued until September, after which Grampus was joined to the Channel Fleet under Admiral John Norris. On 4 April 1744 she secured her first victory at sea, capturing the 26-gun French vessel La Medee in company with the fourth-rate HMS Dreadnought.

In early 1744 Grampus was engaged against French traders and privateers off Martinique in the Caribbean, securing the capture of eight small enemy vessels while in company with a small squadron of other Royal Navy vessels. Returning to British home waters in April 1744, she was then assigned to escort British trade and supply to Portugal. This was Grampus' last formal duty in British service. On 30 September 1744 she was captured by a French naval squadron in the Bay of Biscay and sailed to the French port of Brest.

== Bibliography ==
- McLaughlan, Ian (2014). The Sloop of War, 1650–1763. Seaforth. ISBN 9781848321878.
- Winfield, Rif (2007). British Warships of the Age of Sail 1714–1792: Design, Construction, Careers and Fates. Seaforth. ISBN 9781844157006.
