= HMS Swift (1741) =

Sloop of the Royal Navy

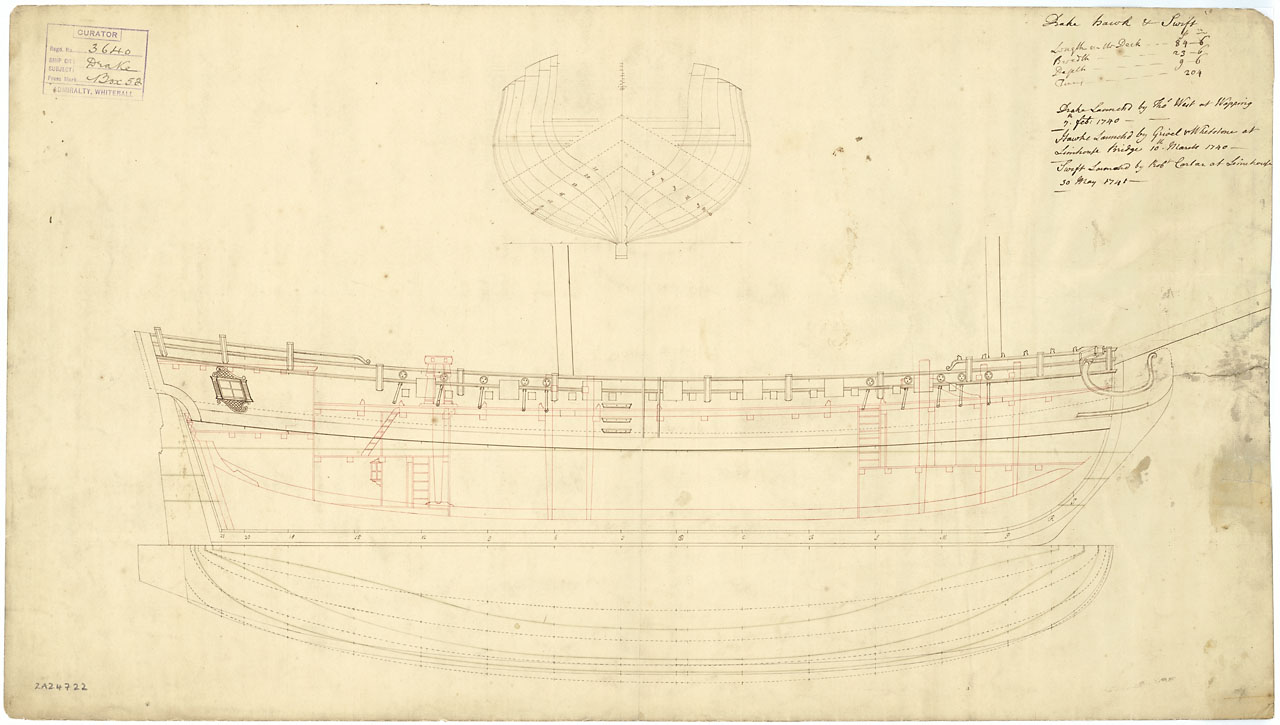

History

Great Britain
- Name: HMS Swift
- Ordered: 6 December 1740
- Builder: Robert Carter, Limehouse
- Laid down: 26 January 1741
- Launched: 30 May 1741
- Completed: 10 July 1741 at Deptford Dockyard
- Commissioned: May 1741
- Out of service: 31 October 1756
- Fate: Lost at sea

General characteristics
- Class & type: 8-gun Drake-class snow-rigged sloop
- Tons burthen: 203 47/94 (bm)
- Length: 85 ft 0 in (25.9 m) (gundeck); 68 ft 8.25 in (20.9 m) (keel)
- Beam: 23 ft 7.25 in (7.2 m)
- Depth of hold: 9 ft 6.5 in (2.9 m)
- Propulsion: Sail
- Sail plan: Snow-rigged sloop
- Complement: 80
- Armament: 8 × 4-pdrs (10 × 4-pdrs from 1744); 12 × 1/2-pdr swivels

HMS Swift was an 8-gun snow-rigged sloop of the Royal Navy, the last of three Drake class sloops constructed during the Anglo-Spanish War of Jenkins' Ear. Launched in 1741, her principal service was as convoy escort and patrol off North Carolina and in the North Sea. She was lost at sea on 31 October 1756.

== Construction ==
Swift was the third of three small, fast vessels designed by Surveyor of the Navy Jacob Acworth to guard merchant shipping between North America and Britain after the declaration of war against Spain in 1739. (Note: Other Drake-class vessels were HMS Drake and HMS Hawk.) She was ordered in December 1740 to be constructed by civilian shipwright Robert Carter on the waterfront at Limehouse, then fitted out, armed and commissioned at Deptford Dockyard. Her dimensions were in keeping with other vessels of her class, with an overall length of 85 ft 0 in (25.9 m), a beam of 23 ft 7.25 in (7.2 m) and measuring 203 47/94 tons burthen.

Construction costs were low, being £1,475 in shipwright fees and building expenses and a further £1,626 for fittings. An additional sailroom was added amidships in 1750.

Swift had two square-rigged masts, supported by a third trysail mast aft of the main. She was built with seven pairs of gunports along her upper deck, but initially armed with only eight four-pounder cannons with the remaining ports left unused. Twelve lightweight half-pounder swivel guns (anti-personnel weapons) were mounted on posts along the sides of the deck, and two more four-pounder cannons were added by Admiralty Order in 1744. The vessel was established with a complement of 80 men.

== Naval career ==
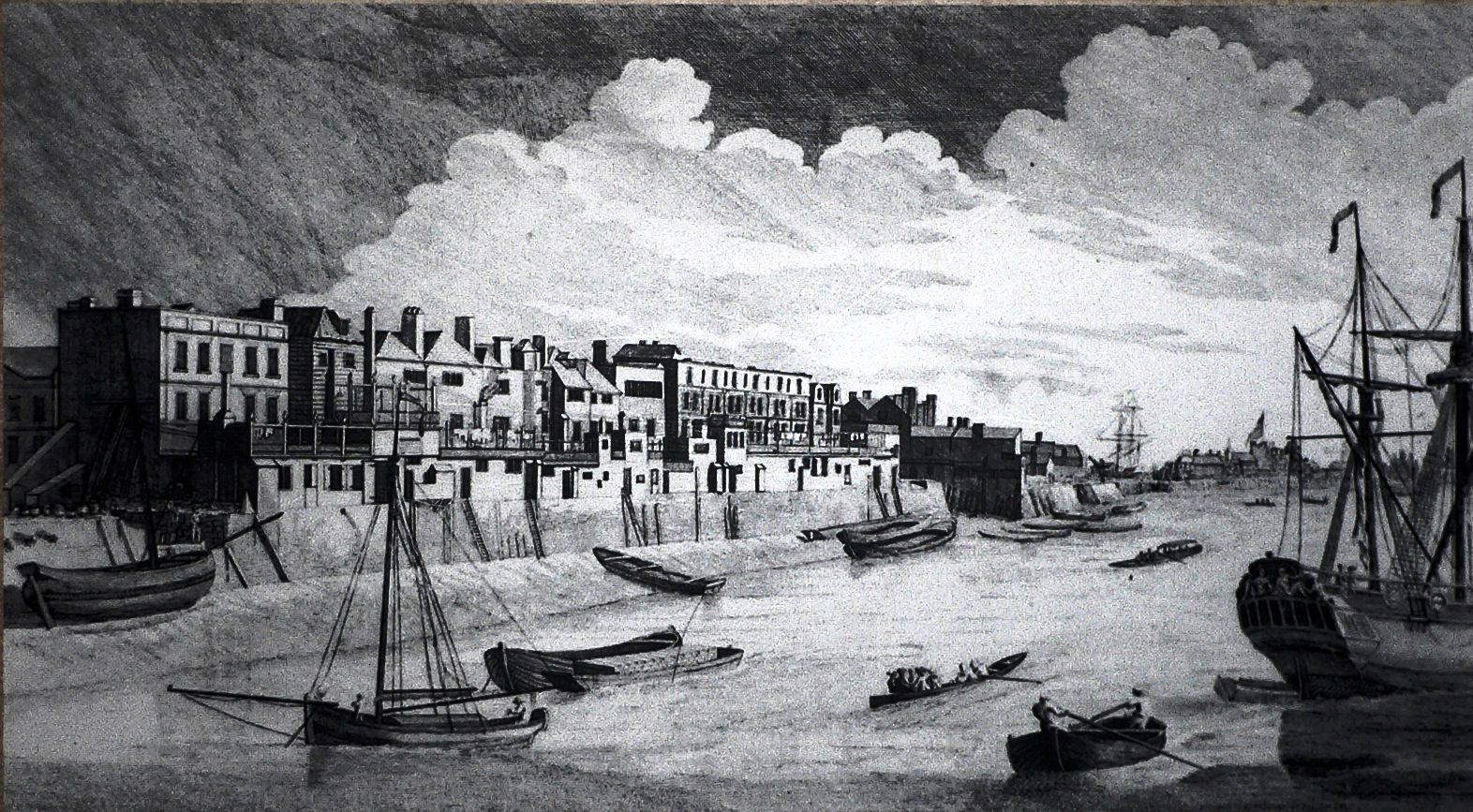
The Limehouse waterfront, where Swift was constructed in 1741. From a contemporary engraving by John Boydell.

Swift was commissioned in May 1741 under Commander William Bladwell, and assigned to the protection of British shipping off the Carolinas station in North America. In July 1741 she sailed to the aid of the British colony on St Simons Island, which was besieged by a Spanish army from Florida. She came within sight of the Spanish fleet in St Simons harbour on 13 July, accompanied by her sister ship Hawk and the ageing 24-gun post-ship Flamborough. However, Flamborough's captain Joseph Hamar refused to engage the larger Spanish fleet, and all three British vessels promptly returned to Charlestown. Their appearance unnerved the Spanish, who abandoned their assault and retreated first to Jekyll Island and then back to Florida.

A more direct success in battle was achieved in March 1742 when Swift captured a Spanish merchant vessel loaded with provisions. The captured vessel was sent to Jamaica as a prize, with proceeds from her subsequent sale to be shared between Admiralty and members of Swift's crew. After three years service off North Carolina she was recommissioned in June 1744 for patrol and convoy escort in the North Sea under Commander Peter Denis. In February 1745 Denis was transferred to the captaincy of the 26-gun sixth-rate HMS Greyhound, and Swift was reassigned to Commander John Hill under her previous orders for North Sea escort and patrol. Hill departed Swift in August 1745, and was replaced by Lieutenant William Fortescue. In January 1747 Fortescue was also replaced, with captaincy transferring to Commander Thomas Ward.

In May 1752 the sloop was paid off for repairs at Sheerness dockyards, but work was slow and she was not returned to sea until March of the following year. By this time Commander Ward had been replaced and Swift returned to service under Commander Thomas Hankerson. Swift was now assigned to convoy escort in the English Channel, undergoing a seventh change of command in March 1755, with Hankerson giving way for Commander George Legge. In April 1756, command was again transferred, from Legge to Commander Walker Farr.

A further repair was undertaken at Deptford in June 1756, lasting three months and costing £1008 in shipwright fees and fitting expenses. Swift subsequently returned to her North Sea station, but was lost at sea on 31 October 1756.

== Bibliography ==
- Cate, Margaret Davis (June 1943). "Fort Frederica and the Battle of Bloody Marsh". The Georgia Historical Quarterly. 27 (2). Georgia Historical Society. JSTOR 40576871.
- Winfield, Rif (2007). British Warships of the Age of Sail 1714–1792: Design, Construction, Careers and Fates. Seaforth. ISBN 9781844157006.
