= HMS Hawk (1741) =

Sloop of the Royal Navy

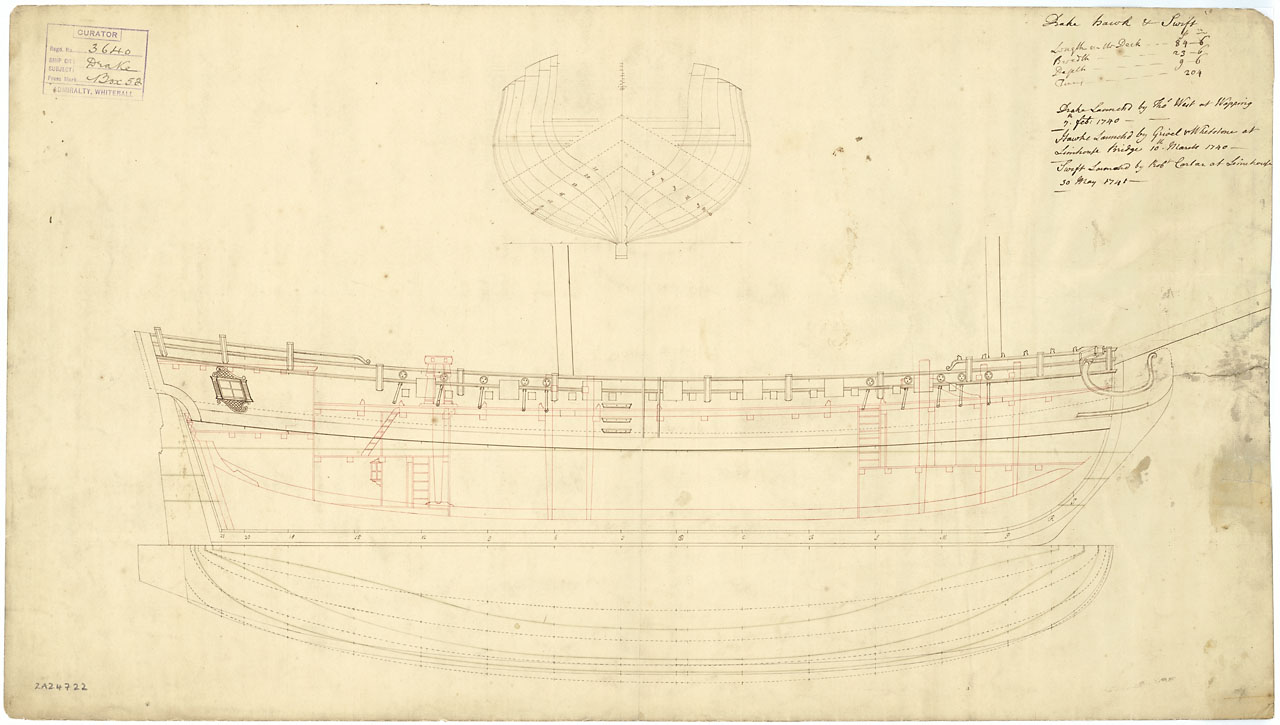
- HMS Hawke

History

Great Britain
- Name: HMS Hawk
- Ordered: 25 August 1740
- Builder: Grevill & Whetstone, Limehouse
- Laid down: 20 October 1740
- Launched: 10 March 1741
- Completed: 26 April 1741 at Deptford Dockyard
- Commissioned: May 1741
- Out of service: October 1747
- Fate: Broken up, Deptford Dockyard

General characteristics
- Class & type: 8-gun Drake-class snow-rigged sloop
- Tons burthen: 205 76/94 (bm)
- Length: 84 ft 5 in (25.7 m) (gundeck); 68 ft 8.5 in (20.9 m) (keel)
- Beam: 23 ft 8.75 in (7.2 m)
- Depth of hold: 9 ft 6.5 in (2.9 m)
- Propulsion: Sail
- Sail plan: Snow-rigged sloop
- Complement: 80
- Armament: 8 × 4-pdrs (10 × 4-pdrs from 1744); 12 × 1/2-pdr swivels

HMS Hawk was an eight-gun snow-rigged sloop of the Royal Navy, the second of three Drake class sloops constructed during the Anglo-Spanish War of Jenkins' Ear. Launched in 1741, her principal service was as convoy escort and patrol in the Irish Sea. She was broken up at Deptford Dockyard in 1747.

== Construction ==
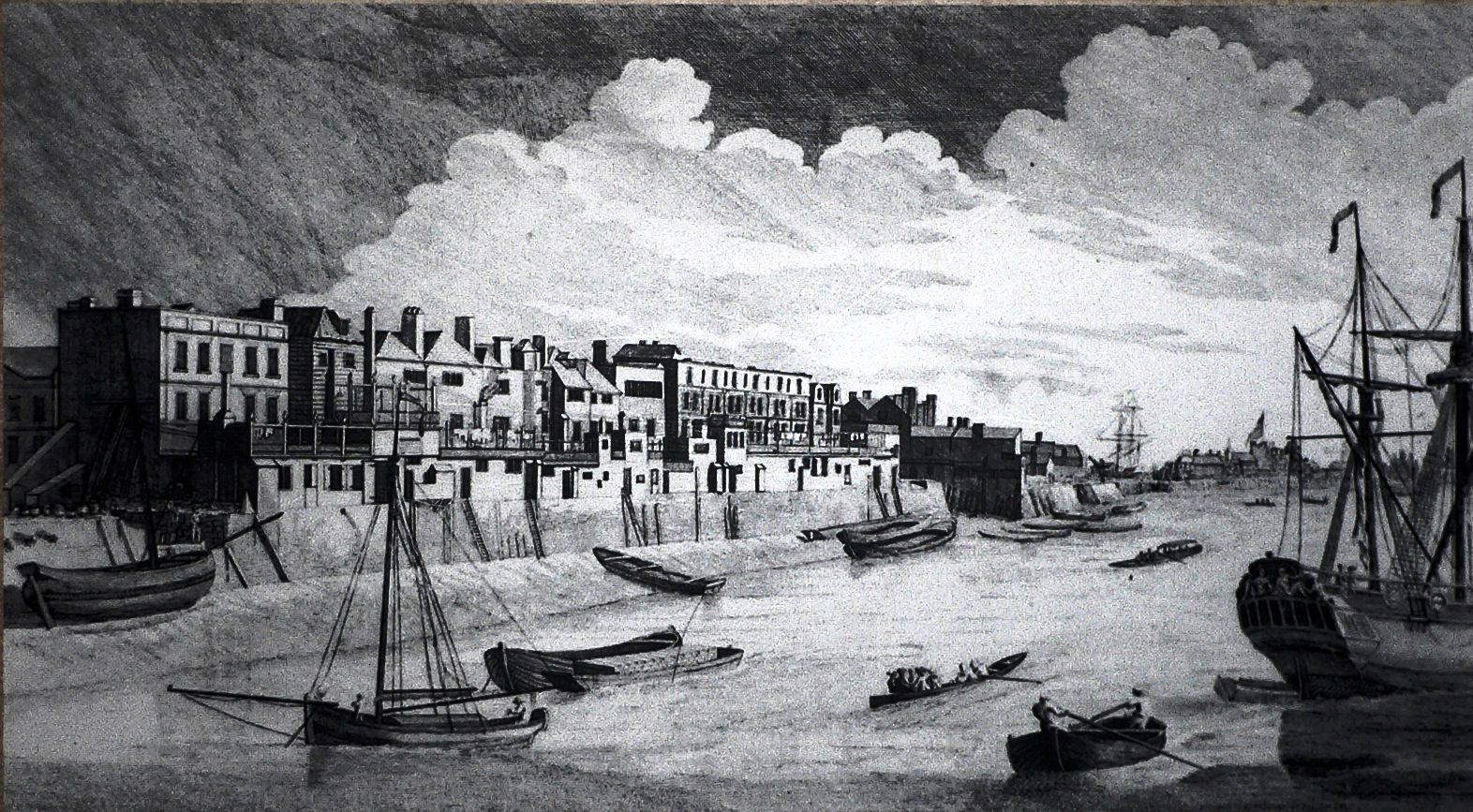
The Limehouse waterfront, where Hawk was constructed in 1741. From a contemporary engraving by John Boydell.

Hawk was the second of three small, fast vessels designed by Surveyor of the Navy Jacob Acworth to guard merchant shipping in British home waters after the declaration of war against Spain in 1739. (Note: Other Drake-class vessels were HMS Drake and HMS Swift.) She was ordered in August 1740, to be constructed by contract by shipwrights Grevill and Whetstone on the waterfront at Limehouse on the River Thames, and was then fitted out, armed and commissioned at Deptford Dockyard. Her dimensions were in keeping with other vessels of her class, with an overall length of 84 ft 5 in (25.7 m), a beam of 23 ft 8.75 in (7.2 m) and measuring 205 76/94 tons burthen. Construction costs were low, being £1,550 in shipwright fees and building expenses and a further £1,505 for fittings.

Hawk had two masts, supported by a trysail mast aft of the main mast, being square-rigged on the fore and main masts. She was built with seven pairs of gunports along her upper deck, but initially armed with only eight four-pounder cannons with the remaining ports left unused. Twelve lightweight half-pounder swivel guns (anti-personnel weapons) were mounted on posts along the sides of the deck, and two more four-pounder cannons were added in 1744. The vessel was established with a complement of 80 men.

== Naval career ==
Hawk was commissioned in May 1741 under Commander William Bruce, and assigned to the protection of the British whaling fleet off Spitzbergen. At the conclusion of the whaling season Hawk was briefly stationed off the Carolinas, remaining there until Commander Bruce's death on 12 June 1742. Hawk was then sailed to England and assigned to escort and patrol in the Irish Sea, under Commander Arthur Forrest.

The sloop returned to England in 1744 and was decommissioned in April of that year to enable refitting at Deptford for a cost of £1,735. Her armament was increased and her mast plan shortened, with the main mast reduced by 4 ft (1.2 m) to 61 ft 6 in (18.75 m), and her foremast reduced by 1 ft (0.30 m) to 54 ft 6 in (16.61 m).

She was recommissioned in May, and relaunched in June, for patrol duties along the Thames Estuary under Commander Samuel Masterson. In 1745 she returned to her former station as a convoy escort in the Irish Sea, guarding merchant vessels approaching the British Isles. In August 1745 her captaincy passed from Masterson to Commander Frederick Hyde.

Hawk was decommissioned and broken up at Deptford Dockyard in October 1747.

== Bibliography ==
- McLaughlan, Ian (2014). The Sloop of War 1650 - 1763. Seaforth. ISBN 9781848321878.
- Winfield, Rif (2007). British Warships of the Age of Sail 1714–1792: Design, Construction, Careers and Fates. Seaforth. ISBN 9781844157006.
