= French flûte Canada (1742) =

Type of flûte

History

France
- Name: Canada
- Builder: Rene-Nicolas Levasseur
- Laid down: September 1739
- Launched: 4 June 1742
- Fate: Broken up 1747

General characteristics
- Type: Flûte
- Sail plan: Ship-rigged
- Complement: 180
- Armament: Broadside weight: 120 French livre; 4 × French 12-pounder guns; 24 × French 8-pounder guns

Canada was a purpose-built 28-gun French sixth-rate flûte, built in Quebec, Canada. She was launched on the 4th of June for the French Navy.

She was broken up in 1747.
