= HMS Saltash (1741) =

Sloop of the Royal Navy

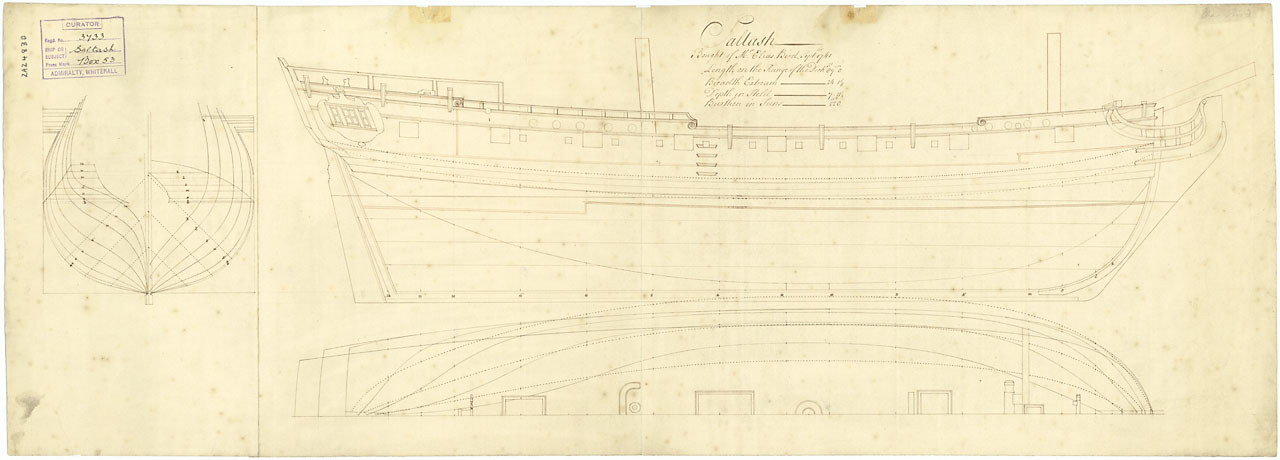
- Saltash

History

Great Britain
- Name: HMS Saltash
- Builder: Henry Bird, Deptford Wet Dock
- Laid down: 1741
- Launched: 3 September 1741
- Completed: 3 November 1741 at builder's shipyard
- Commissioned: 1741
- Fate: Burnt off Cadiz on 18 April 1742

General characteristics
- Class & type: sloop
- Tons burthen: 220 86/94 (bm)
- Length: 89 ft 0 in (27.1 m) (gundeck); 71 ft 3.625 in (21.7 m) (keel)
- Beam: 24 ft 1.625 in (7.4 m)
- Depth of hold: 7 ft 11.5 in (2.4 m)
- Sail plan: Snow
- Complement: 90
- Armament: 8 × 4-pounder guns; also 12 x ½-pounder swivel guns

HMS Saltash was an 8-gun two-masted sloop of the Royal Navy, built on speculation by Henry Bird at Deptford Wet Dock on the Thames River, England. She was purchased while building by the Navy Board at the end of August 1741 to replace the 1732-built sloop of the same name (which was sold on 24 August). The new sloop was launched on 3 September.

She was commissioned in 1741 under Commander Peter Toms, and sailed for the Straits of Gibraltar. In 1742 she was under Commander Arthur Upton; she grounded in the Gulf of Cadiz on 16 April 1742 while chasing a Spanish polacca and was burnt by her crew two days later to prevent capture by the Spanish.
