= HMS Drake (1741) =

Sloop of the Royal Navy

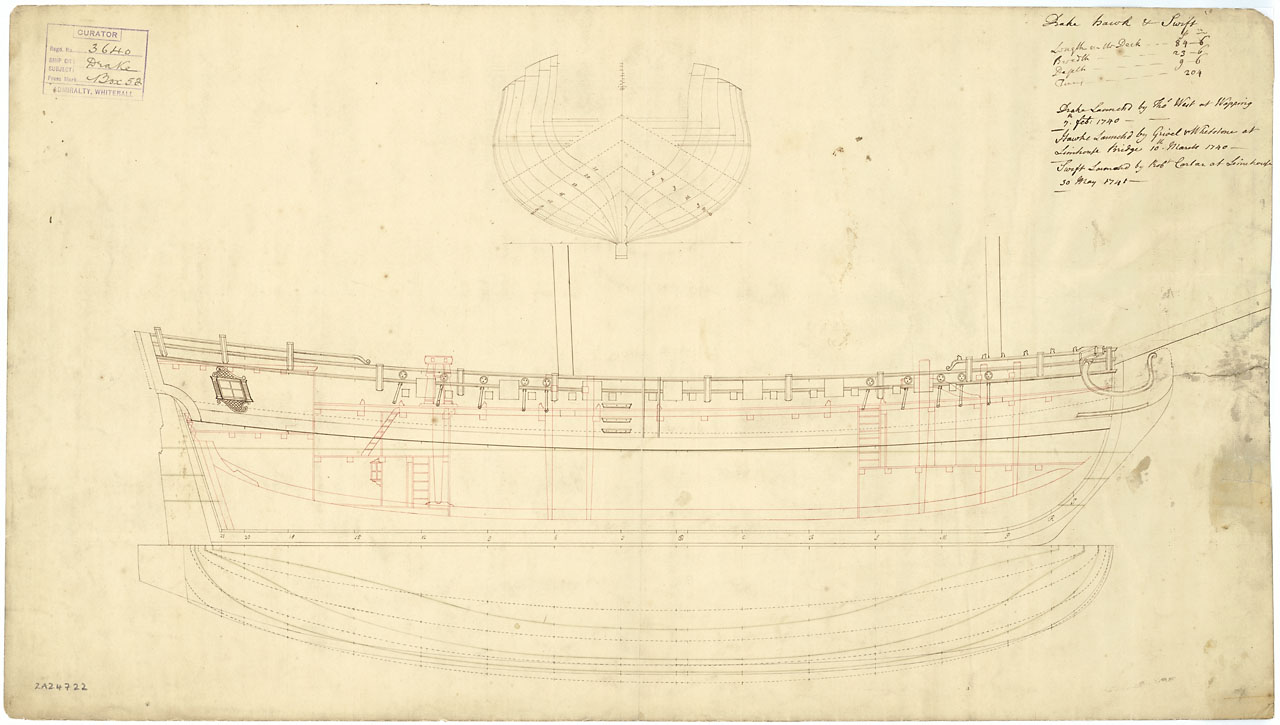

History

Great Britain
- Name: HMS Drake
- Ordered: 24 June 1740
- Builder: Thomas West, Wapping
- Laid down: 25 September 1740
- Launched: 19 February 1741
- Completed: 4 April 1741 at Deptford Dockyard
- Commissioned: February 1741
- Out of service: 22 November 1742
- Fate: Wrecked in Gibraltar harbour

General characteristics
- Class & type: 8-gun Drake-class snow sloop
- Tons burthen: 206 43/94 (bm)
- Length: 85 ft 1.5 in (25.9 m) (overall); 68 ft 8.6 in (20.9 m) (keel)
- Beam: 23 ft 9.25 in (7.2 m)
- Draught: 9 ft 6 in (2.9 m)
- Propulsion: Sails
- Sail plan: Snow-rigged sloop
- Complement: 80
- Armament: 8 × 4-pdrs; 12 × 1/2-pdr swivels

HMS Drake was an 8-gun snow-rigged sloop of the Royal Navy, launched in 1741 as the first of three Drake-class sloops constructed for convoy duty during the Anglo-Spanish War of Jenkins' Ear from 1739 to 1742. After limited service off the Channel Islands, she was sailed to Gibraltar, where she was wrecked in 1742 while under the temporary command of her first lieutenant.

== Construction ==
Drake was the first of three small, fast vessels designed by Surveyor of the Navy Jacob Acworth to guard merchant convoys in British home waters after the declaration of war against Spain in 1739. (Note: Other Drake-class vessels were HMS Hawk and HMS Swift) She was ordered in June 1740, to be constructed by shipwright Thomas West in the civilian dockyard at Deptford. Her dimensions were in keeping with other vessels of her class with an overall length of 85 ft 1.5 in (25.9 m), a beam of 23 ft 9.25 in (7.2 m) and measuring 206 43/94 tons burthen.

She had two masts, square-rigged and supported by a trysail mast aft of the main mast. Although fitted with seven pairs of gunports along her upper deck, she was armed with only eight four-pounder cannons with the remaining ports left unused. Twelve lightweight half-pounder swivel guns were also mounted on the deck, and her complement was 80 men.

== Active service ==
Drake was commissioned in February 1741 under Commander Frederick Rogers. She assisted convoys in waters surrounding the Channel Islands for the remainder of that year, then sailed for Gibraltar in December. There the captaincy was transferred to Commander John Pitman, and six months later to Commander John Stringer who continued her convoy duties in the Channel and off Gibraltar itself.

== Wreck ==
On 22 November 1742, Drake was under the temporary command of Lieutenant Nathaniel Stephens when she was wrecked in Gibraltar harbour and left in an unsalvageable condition. The wreck lay abandoned on the Gibraltar shore for several years; it was finally sold out of service on 13 October 1748.

== Bibliography ==
- McLaughlan, Ian. The Sloop of War 1650-1763. Seaforth Publishing, 2014. ISBN 978-1-84832-187-8.
- Winfield, Rif (2007). British Warships of the Age of Sail 1714–1792: Design, Construction, Careers and Fates. Seaforth. ISBN 9781844157006.
