= Jacob Ackworth =

English shipbuilder and ship designer (1668–1749)

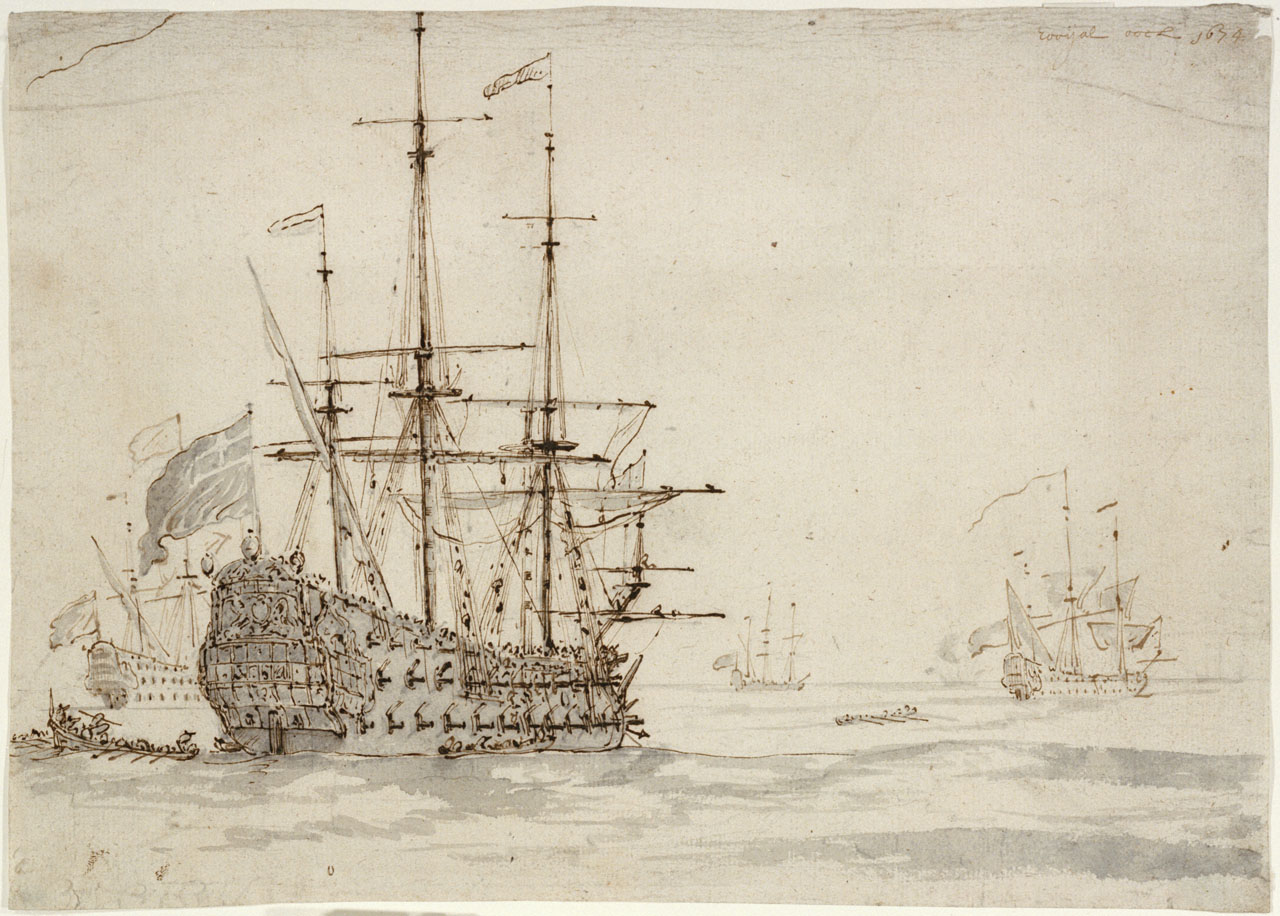
HMS Royal Oak, which Ackworth redesigned

Sir Jacob Ackworth or Acworth (1668–1749) was an English shipwright and ship designer employed by the Royal Navy. As a designer he adopted Newtonian theories to create lighter and faster ships but this approach marginalised him with the very traditional dockyards and he spent his final years on the Navy Board as an advisor.

== Life ==
He was born in 1668 in Chatham, Kent the son of John Ackworth (1641-1690) and his wife Sarah Boyce (1643-1717). He was probably apprenticed as a ship surveyor in the Royal Navy in 1682 aged 14. He served time on HMS Hope probably as apprentice ship's carpenter under Captain John Moore. He quickly showed a flair for design. He was possibly still on the ship during the Battle of Beachy Head (1690).

In July 1690 (two weeks after the battle) he transferred to the much smaller HMS Salamander (1687). As part of the crew of only 35 he was certainly the only Ship's Carpenter on board. He then moved successively to larger and larger ships as Ship's Carpenter: HMS Play Prize, 30-gun, 130 crew under Captain James Buck, 1691 to 1693; HMS Bonaventure, 52-gun crew around 300, from 1693 to 1696; HMS Swiftsure mainly involved in its break up at Harwich 1696 to 1698. In December 1698 he moved wholly to land-based roles, becoming Master Mastmaker at Chatham Dockyard. In February 1705 he became Master Shipwright at Harwich Dockyard and in November 1705 became Master Shipwright at Sheerness. From this date the Royal Navy lists ships launched in his name.

In August 1709 he became Master of Woolwich Dockyard. From 1711 he became involved in ship design, beginning with the sloops HMS Happy and HMS Hazard. In 1715 he was appointed Surveyor of the Royal Navy, a post which he held until his death in 1749 (although from 1745 his colleague Joseph Allin was appointed to share the post). From this point he appears involved in both design and build, beginning with the redesign of HMS Cambridge (1715). For the next 30 years he remained as sole Surveyor responsible for overseeing all of the designs produced by the Master Shipwrights in the individual Royal Dockyards, and for the following four years (until his death) shared that responsibility with Allin. Among other ships, he designed the sloops Hound and Trial in 1732, the Drake-class sloop in 1740; in 1741 he designed the standard 20-gun frigate for the 1741 Establishment (later modified in 1745); the yacht HMS Portsmouth designed 1740/41; the Merlin-class sloop in 1743 (to which design 21 sloops were built between 1743 and 1748); and the 24-gun frigate HMS Seahorse designed 1748.

Ackworth was knighted in 1722 by King George I. Non-naval works as Surveyor included the design of Putney Bridge.

== Ships built ==
- HMS Sorlings (1706) 42-gun ship at Sheerness
- HMS Ludlow Castle (1707) 42-gun frigate at Sheerness
- HMS Adventure (1709) 42-gun frigate at Sheerness
- HMS Delight (1709) 14-gun ship at Woolwich Dockyard
- HMS Devonshire (1710) his first major commission: an 80-gun ship of the line launched at Woolwich with a crew of 520
- HMS Happy (1711) 6 gun sloop at Woolwich
- HMS Hazard (1711) 6 gun sloop at Woolwich
- HMS Ormonde (1711) 54 gun ship of the line at Woolwich
- HMS Hind (1711) 24 gun ship at Woolwich
- HMS Greyhound (1712) 42 gun ship at Woolwich
- HMS Royal Oak (1674) rebuilding of the 70-gun ship of the line at Woolwich
- HMS Cambridge (1715) rebuilding of 80-gun ship of the line at Woolwich

== Family ==
He was married twice: in 1696 at Chatham, Kent he married Elizabeth Slater; following her death (c.1709) he married Esther Loton (1682-1752). He had six children by his first marriage and two by his second, including the unusually named Avice Ackworth who married a Mr Wheate.
