= List of shipwrecks in 1747 =

The List of shipwrecks in 1747 includes some ships sunk, wrecked or otherwise lost during 1747.

table of contents
1747
Jan	Feb	Mar	Apr
May	Jun	Jul	Aug
Sep	Oct	Nov	Dec
Unknown date

== April ==
1747 did not begin on 1 January!^{[Note 1]}

=== Unknown date ===
List of shipwrecks: Unknown date 1747
Ship	State	Description
Fredericksburg	Denmark	The ship foundered in Mount's Bay. before 7 April
Jane	Great Britain	The ship was lost near Wexford, Ireland before 7 April. She was on a voyage from Dartmouth, Devon, to Newfoundland, British America.

== May ==
=== Unknown date ===
List of shipwrecks: Unknown date 1747
Ship	State	Description
Blanchard's Adventure	Great Britain	The ship was lost near Dungeness, Kent, before 8 May. She was on a voyage from Hamburg to Cowes, Isle of Wight.
Ghent Packet	Dutch Republic	The ship foundered in the North Sea before 22 May. She was on a voyage from Dort, South Holland, to London, Great Britain.
Neptune	Great Britain	The ship was lost near Figueira, Portugal, before 12 May. She was on a voyage from Carolina, British America, to Lisbon, Portugal.

== June ==
=== 21 June ===
List of shipwrecks: 21 June 1747
Ship	State	Description
L'Étoile	French Navy	The 46-gun Man-of-war ran aground near Cape Finisterre. She was set afire and scuttled to prevent her being captured by HMS Ambuscade, HMS Monmouth and HMS Portland (all (Kingdom of Great Britain) Royal Navy).

=== 26 June ===
List of shipwrecks: 26 June 1747
Ship	State	Description
HMS Maidstone	(Kingdom of Great Britain) Royal Navy	The fourth rate ship of the line ran aground off Saint-Malo, Finistère, France, and was wrecked.

=== Unknown date ===
List of shipwrecks: Unknown date 1747
Ship	State	Description
Duke of Cumberland	Great Britain	The privateer was lost on the French coast before 19 June with some loss of life.
Jenny	Great Britain	The ship was lost in the Tagus before 19 June. She was on a voyage from Carolina, British America, to Lisbon, Portugal.
L'Orient	Portugal	The ship was lost at Peniche before 23 June. She was on a voyage from Hamburg to Lisbon.

== July ==
=== 5 July ===
List of shipwrecks: 5 July 1747
Ship	State	Description
Le Grand Grenon alt. Grenot	Kingdom of France	The privateer was wrecked.

=== Unknown date ===
List of shipwrecks: Unknown date 1747
Ship	State	Description
Expedition	Great Britain	The ship was lost on the Goodwin Sands, Kent, before 24 July. She was on a voyage from Saint Petersburg, Russia, to London
Reginald & Jacob	Great Britain	The ship was lost on the Goodwin Sands before 24 July. She was on a voyage from Bergen, Norway, to a French port.
Saint Esprit	France	The ship was lost on the Goodwin Sands before 14 July.

== August ==
=== Unknown date ===
List of shipwrecks: Unknown date 1747
Ship	State	Description
Liefde	Hamburg	The ship foundered in the English Channel off Dover, Kent, Great Britain before 28 August. She was on a voyage from Hamburg to Lisbon, Portugal.
HMS Whitehaven	(Kingdom of Great Britain) Royal Navy	The Man-of-war was destroyed by an explosion about 8 leagues (24 nautical miles (44 km) north west of Tory Island, County Donegal, Ireland before 21 August with the loss of seventeen of her crew.

== September ==
=== 15 September ===
List of shipwrecks: 15 September 1747
Ship	State	Description
Horner	Great Britain	The ship foundered in the Atlantic Ocean with the loss of all hands. She was on a voyage from Barbados to Liverpool, Lancashire.
John and Martha	Great Britain	The ship foundered in the Atlantic Ocean. Her crew were rescued. She was on a voyage from Saint Kitts to London.
Katherine	Great Britain	The ship foundered in the Atlantic Ocean. Her crew were rescued. She was on a voyage from Saint Kitts to London.
HMS Lyme	(Kingdom of Great Britain) Royal Navy	The Man-of-war capsized in the Atlantic Ocean with the loss of all but four of her crew.
Polly	Great Britain	The ship foundered in the Atlantic Ocean. Her crew were rescued. She was on a voyage from Saint Kitts to Liverpool.
Scroupe	Great Britain	The ship foundered in the Atlantic Ocean. Her crew were rescued. SHe was on a voyage from Saint Kitts to London.
Unicorn	Great Britain	The ship foundered in the Atlantic Ocean. Her crew were rescued. She was on a voyage from Saint Kitts to London.
William & Anne	Great Britain	The ship foundered in the Atlantic Ocean. Her crew were rescued. She was on a voyage from Saint Kitts to London.
William & Jane	Great Britain	The ship foundered in the Atlantic Ocean. She was on a voyage from Barbados to Falmouth, Cornwall.

=== 21 September ===
List of shipwrecks: 21 September 1747
Ship	State	Description
Cornwally	Great Britain	The ship was lost in a storm at Saint Kitts.
Duke of Marlborough	Great Britain	The ship was lost in a storm at Saint Kitts.
Emra	Great Britain	The ship was lost in a storm at Saint Kitts.
Friend's Goodwill	Great Britain	The ship was lost in a storm at Montserrat.
Imperial Anne	Great Britain	The ship was lost in a storm at Montserrat.
Mary	Great Britain	The ship was lost in a storm at Nevis.
Mary	Great Britain	The ship was lost in a storm at Saint Kitts.
Owen	Great Britain	The galley was lost in a storm at Saint Kitts.
Pretty Patsey	Great Britain	The ship was lost in a storm at Saint Kitts.
Rising Sun	Great Britain	The ship was lost in a storm at Saint Kitts.
Rowlandson	Great Britain	The ship was lost in a storm at Saint Kitts.
Swallow	Great Britain	The ship was lost in a storm at Saint Kitts.

== October ==
=== 8 October ===
List of shipwrecks: 8 October 1747
Ship	State	Description
HMS Dartmouth	(Kingdom of Great Britain) Royal Navy	HMS Dartmouth. War of the Austrian Succession, Voyage of the Glorioso: The fourth rate ship of the line was sunk by Glorioso (Spanish Navy) off Cape Finisterre with the loss of most of her crew.

=== 24 October ===
List of shipwrecks: 24 October 1747
Ship	State	Description
Daniel	Great Britain	The ship was lost in a storm at Saint Kitts.
Defire	Great Britain	The ship was lost in a storm at Saint Kitts.
Bowell	Great Britain	The ship was lost in a storm at Saint Kitts.
Happy	Great Britain	The ship was lost in a storm at Saint Kitts.
Hope	Great Britain	The ship was lost in a storm at Saint Kitts.
King David	France	The ship was lost in a storm at Saint Kitts.
Little George	Great Britain	The ship was lost in a storm at Saint Kitts.
LOndon Pcket	Great Britain	The ship was lost in a storm at Montserrat.
Nisbitt	Great Britain	The ship was lost in a storm at Saint Kitts.
Otley	Great Britain	The ship was lost in a storm at Saint Kitts.
Parham	Great Britain	The pink was lost in a storm at Saint Kitts.
Pearl	Great Britain	The ship was lost in a storm at Saint Kitts.
Planter	Great Britain	The ship was lost in a storm at Saint Kitts.

=== 25 October ===
List of shipwrecks: 25 October 1747
Ship	State	Description
Reijgersdaal	Dutch East India Company	The East Indiaman foundered between Robben Island and Dassen Island, Cape Colony with the loss of 277 of her 297 crew.

=== 28 October ===
List of shipwrecks: 28 October 1747
Ship	State	Description
Royal Hunter	Great Britain	The privateer was wrecked on the Nass Sand, in the Bristol Channel with the loss of 110 lives.

=== Unknown date ===
List of shipwrecks: Unknown date 1747
Ship	State	Description
Concord	Great Britain	The ship foundered in the North Sea off the mouth of the River Humber before 9 October. She was on a voyage from Hull, Yorkshire, to London.
Speedwell	Ireland	The ship was lost on the Isle of Lewis, Outer Hebrides, Great Britain before 6 October. She was on a voyage from Narva, Russia, to Dublin.

== November ==
=== 19 November ===
List of shipwrecks: 19 November 1747
Ship	State	Description
Sheerwater	Great Britain	The ship was driven ashore at Hylake, Lancashire. She was on a voyage from Tortola to Liverpool, Lancashire.

=== 20 November ===
List of shipwrecks: 20 November 1747
Ship	State	Description
Little Benjamin	Hamburg	The ship was driven ashore and wrecked near Dover, Kent Great Britain. She was on a voyage from Hamburg to Dover.

=== 29 November ===
List of shipwrecks: 29 November 1747
Ship	State	Description
Nymphs Prize	Great Britain	Also known as Nympha Americana, she was lost near Beachy Head, on the coast of Sussex on 29 November.

=== Unknown date ===
List of shipwrecks: Unknown date 1747
Ship	State	Description
Elizabeth	Great Britain	The ship was lost on the coast of Norfolk before 1 December. She was on a voyage from Dunbar, Lothian, to London.
Francis	Ireland	The ship was lost on the coast of County Kerry before 1 December. She was on a voyage from Newfoundland, British America, to Cork.
Gilpin	Great Britain	The ship was driven ashore in the Orkney Islands before 24 November.
Nasthaniel and John	Great Britain	The ship was lost on the coast of Ireland before 1 December. She was on a voyage from Saint Petersburg, Russia, to London.

== December ==
=== 1 December ===
List of shipwrecks: 1 December 1747
Ship	State	Description
Blessing	Great Britain	The ship foundered in The Downs. Her crew were rescued.
Elizabeth and Sarah	Great Britain	The ship foundered in the North Sea. She was on a voyage from Bergen, Norway, to Wells-next-the-Sea, Norfolk.
Expedition	Great Britain	The ship foundered in the North Sea. She was on a voyage from Hull, Yorkshire, to London.
Friendship	Great Britain	The ship foundered in the North Sea. She was on a voyage from London to Vlissingen, South Holland, Dutch Republic.
God's Help	Great Britain	The ship foundered in the North Sea. She was on a voyage from Great Yarmouth. to Livorno, Grand Duchy of Tuscany.
Hetty	Great Britain	The ship was driven ashore at Ramsgate, Kent.
King George	Great Britain	The ship foundered whilst on a voyage from London to Lisbon, Portugal.
Mary	Great Britain	The ship foundered in the North Sea. She was on a voyage from London to Amsterdam, North Holland, Dutch Republic.
Patriarch	Lübeck	The ship foundered. She was on a voyage from Lübeck to "Northcopen".
Postbrook	Great Britain	The ship was driven ashore at Ramsgate.
Susannah	Danzig	The ship foundered off Great Yarmouth, Norfolk. She was on a voyage from Danzig to Liverpool, Lancashire, Great Britain.
Trial	Great Britain	The ship foundered in the English Channel. She was on a voyage from Southampton, Hampshire, to Lisbon, Portugal.
Virginia Packet	(Kingdom of Great Britain) British America	The ship foundered in the English Channel off Margate, Kent.

=== Unknown date ===
List of shipwrecks: Unknown date 1747
Ship	State	Description
Britannia	Great Britain	The ship was lost near Milford Haven, Pembrokeshire, before 22 December. She was on a voyage from Bristol, Gloucestershire, to Dublin, Ireland.
Buck	Great Britain	The ship was lost near Great Yarmouth, Norfolk, before 11 December. She was on a voyage from a Baltic port to London.
Friendship	Great Britain	The ship foundered in the English Channel off Beachy Head, Sussex, before 11 December. She was on a voyage from Southampton, Hampshire, to London.
Golden Sarah	Great Britain	The ship foundered before 22 December with the loss of nine of her crew. She was on a voyage from Saint Petersburg, Russia, to London.
Good Intent	Great Britain	The ship was driven ashore and wrecked on Texel, North Holland, Dutch Republic before 15 December She was on a voyage from London to Rotterdam, South Holland, Dutch Republic.
Hammond	Great Britain	The ship foundered in the North Sea off Scarborough, Yorkshire, before 15 December. She was on a voyage from Narva, Russia, to London.
Hannah	Great Britain	The ship capsized off Lowestoft, Suffolk, before 15 December. She was on a voyage from a Baltic port to London.
Hope	Great Britain	The ship foundered in the North Sea before 22 December. She was on a voyage from London to Zierikzee, Zeeland, Dutch Republic.
Love	Great Britain	The galley was driven ashore and sank near The Needles, Isle of Wight, before 22 December. She was on a voyage from Maryland, British America, to London.
Loyal Jane	Great Britain	The ship was lost at Vlissingen, South Holland, before 15 December.
Mayflower	Great Britain	The ship capsized at King's Lynn, Norfolk, before 8 December.
Phenix	Great Britain	The ship was wrecked in the Isles of Scilly before 22 December. She was on a voyage from London to Dublin.

== January ==
=== 25 January ===
List of shipwrecks: 25 January 1747
Ship	State	Description
Cerf	France	Frigate constructed and based in Saint Malo (Brittany, France). Probably privateer. Sank in the mist at the Minquiers, Channel Islands.

=== Unknown date ===
List of shipwrecks: Unknown date 1747
Ship	State	Description
Cranbury	Great Britain	The ship foundered in the Bay of Biscay before 29 January. She was on a voyage from Southampton, Hampshire, to Lisbon, Portugal
Hannah	Ireland	The ship was lost near Limerick before 22 January. She was on a voyage from Newfoundland, British America, to Limerick

== February ==
=== 20 February ===
List of shipwrecks: 20 February 1747
Ship	State	Description
Matthew	Great Britain	The ship foundered in the Atlantic Ocean 38 leagues (114 nautical miles (211 km)) west of Cape Finisterre, Spain. Her crew were rescued by a Dutch vessel. She was on a voyage from Lisbon, Portugal, to an English port.

=== 23 February ===
List of shipwrecks: 23 February 1747
Ship	State	Description
Betty	Great Britain	The ship foundered in The Downs. She was on a voyage from London to Jamaica.

=== Unknown date ===
List of shipwrecks: Unknown date 1747
Ship	State	Description
Friendship	Great Britain	The ship was wrecked on Coll, Inner Hebrides. She was on a voyage from Maryland, British America, to London.
HMS Lizard	(Kingdom of Great Britain) Royal Navy	The sloop-of-war was lost off the Isles of Scilly with the loss of all hands
Recovery	Great Britain	The ship was driven ashore south of Porto, Portugal, by a Spanish privateer before 16 February and was wrecked. She was on a voyage from London to Porto.
Sarah	Great Britain	The ship was driven ashore near Dundrum, County Down, Ireland before 5 February. She was on a voyage from Liverpool, Lancashire, to the West Indies.
Swarthe	Great Britain	The ship foundered in Dundrum Bay before 9 February. She was on a voyage from Liverpool to Tortola.

== March ==
=== Unknown date ===
List of shipwrecks: Unknown date 1747
Ship	State	Description
Caledonia	Great Britain	The ship was destroyed by fire at Livorno, Grand Duchy of Tuscany, before 29 March 1748.
John and Mary	Great Britain	The ship was lost near Tory Island, County Donegal, Ireland before 4 March. She was on a voyage from Maryland, British America, to Liverpool, Lancashire.
Marshall	Great Britain	The ship was lost near Rye, Sussex, before 8 March. She was on a voyage from Maryland to London.
Nuestra Señora Domonte e San Joseph	Spain	The ship was lost on the coast of Galicia before 22 March. She was on a voyage from Dublin, Ireland, to Viana do Bolo.
Speedwell	Great Britain	The ship foundered before 11 March. Her crew were rescued. She was on a voyage from London to Lisbon, Portugal.

== Unknown date ==
List of shipwrecks: Unknown date 1747
Ship	State	Description
Adventure	Great Britain	The ship was lost before 22 December.
Content	Great Britain	The ship was chased ashore by a privateer and wrecked on Barbados before 16 October.
Culloden	Great Britain	The ship was lost at Port Morant, Jamaica, before 25 August She was on a voyage from Jamaica to London.
Dolphin	(Kingdom of Great Britain) British America	The ship was lost on the coast of Florida before 19 January. She was on a voyage from Carolina to Antigua.
Dolphin	Great Britain	The ship foundered near Livorno. Grand Duchy of Tuscany before 15 March.
Dorothy & Elizabeth	(Kingdom of Great Britain) British America	The ship was lost on a reef off Bermuda before 19 June. She was on a voyage from Boston, Massachusetts, to the Leeward Islands.
Duke of Cumberland	Great Britain	The snow was lost in Withywood Bay before 25 August. She was on a voyage from Jamaica to London.
Earl of Derby	Great Britain	The ship was lost at Jamaica before 22 December.
George	Great Britain	The ship foundered in the Atlantic Ocean 350 leagues (1,050 nautical miles (1,940 km) west of The Lizard, Cornwall, before 22 December. She was on a voyage from Newfoundland, British America, to Pool, Dorset.
Greyhound	Great Britain	The ship was chased ashore near Cape Morant, Jamaica, by two Spanish privateers before 29 March 1748 and was lost. She was on a voyage from Jamaica to London.
Heathcote	Great Britain	The ship was lost near "Mocha" before 15 March. She was on a voyage from London to a port in the east of India.
Industry	Great Britain	The ship foundered off the coast of Ireland some time before 24 November. She was on a voyage from Montserrat to London.
John and William	Great Britain	The ship was captured by a French privateer before 5 March but was subsequently lost before 4 March. She was on a voyage from Cape Fare to London.
King William	Great Britain	The ship was lost at Twillingate, British America, before 22 December.
Kitty	Ireland	The ship was captured by the privateer Greyhound (Spain) before 4 September. After being plundered of her cargo, she was sunk by the privateer. Kitty was on a voyage from Cork to Cape Fare.
Lapwing	Great Britain	The ship was driven ashore in the Elbe before 4 December.
Leed's Merchant	Great Britain	The ship was driven ashore in the Elbe before 4 December.
Lewis	Great Britain	The ship was lost off Newfoundland before 8 December.
Margaret	Great Britain	The ship foundered before 5 April 1748. She was om a voyage from London to Mahón, Menorca.
Massonia del Rosario	Republic of Venice	The ship exploded whilst fighting an Algerine cruiser off Gibraltar before 1 March.
Merchant Adventure	Great Britain	The ship was driven ashore in the Elbe before 4 December.
Ogden	Great Britain	The ship was captured by a Spanish privateer east of Jamaica before 23 June. She sank shortly after being captured, with nine survivors. Ogden was on a voyage from an African port to Jamaica.
Pemberton	Great Britain	The ship was lost at Port Morant before 6 October. She was on a voyage from Jamaica to London.
Pepperel	Great Britain	The ship foundered in the Atlantic Ocean before 5 March. She was on a voyage from Southampton, Hampshire, to Maryland, British America
Pilchard	Great Britain	The ship foundered in the Atlantic Ocean off Newfoundland, British America, before 23 October. She was on a voyage from Biddiford, Devon, to Boston, Massachusetts, British America.
Prince Arthur	Great Britain	The ship foundered in the Gulf of Florida before 8 April 1748. She was on a voyage from Jamaica to London.
Priscilla	Great Britain	The ship capsized in the Atlantic Ocean before 22 January. Her crew were rescued. She was on a voyage from Cape Fare to London
Rose	Great Britain	The ship was lost before 26 May. She was on a voyage from Jamaica to London.
Scarborough	Great Britain	The ship was lost on the coast of New England, British America, before 1 April 1748. She was on a voyage from Newcastle upon Tyne, Northumberland, to Boston, Massachusetts.
Success	Great Britain	The ship was lost at Antigua before 5 May.
Tryton	Great Britain	The ship was lost near Bermuda before 12 May. She was on a voyage from Carolina, British America, to London.
Vlissingen	Dutch East India Company	The East Indiaman foundered in Meob Bay, off what is now Namibia, Africa, with the loss of all hands.
William & Mary	(Kingdom of Great Britain) British America	The ship foundered before 26 June. She was on a voyage from Philadelphia, Pennsylvania, to Jamaica.
Willis	Great Britain	The ship was lost on the coast of New England, British America, before 27 November. She was on a voyage from Virginia, British America, to London.
Unnamed	France	The privateer was wrecked on the Goodwin Sands, Kent, Great Britain whilst in pursuit of Fanny (Great Britain). There were thirteen survivors.
Unnamed	France	The privateer sank at Morlaix.

== Notes ==
1. Until 1752, the year began on Lady Day (25 March) Thus 24 March 1746 was followed by 25 March 1747. 31 December 1747 was followed by 1 January 1747.
