= Baltimore-class sloop =

Class overview
- Operators: Royal Navy
- Preceded by: Wolf class
- Succeeded by: Merlin class
- Built: 1742-1743
- In commission: 1742-1762
- Completed: 3
- Lost: 2

General characteristics (common design)
- Type: Sloop-of-war
- Tons burthen: 248 48/94 bm
- Length: 88 ft 0 in (26.8 m) (gundeck); 74 ft 0 in (22.6 m) (keel)
- Beam: 25 ft 1 in (7.6 m)
- Depth of hold: 10 ft 6 in (3.20 m) (Baltimore and Saltash); 11 ft 0 in (3.35 m) (Drake)
- Sail plan: Snow
- Complement: 110 (raised to 125 when armament increased)
- Armament: 10 × 4-pounder guns (in 1744 increased to 14 guns); also 12/14 x ½-pounder swivel guns

The Baltimore class was a class of three sloops of wooden construction built for the Royal Navy during 1742-43. Two were ordered in 1742 and a third in 1743, and - following on from the Wolf class of the previous year - constituted a small further increase in size from the 200 burthen tons which had been the normal size from 1728 to 1739. The hulls of all three were built by contract by commercial shipbuilders on the River Thames, each at a fixed price of £1,677.10.0d (a rate of £6.15.0d per burthen ton); they were then fitted out at Deptford Dockyard for a sum of £1,781.1.9d for Baltimore, £1,737.3.1d for Saltash, and £1,726.10.11d for Drake.

Baltimore and Saltash were built to a design by Charles Calvert, 5th Baron Baltimore, one of the members of the Admiralty Board at that time; the design featured a narrow or "pink" stern, and the two masts carried a snow rig; it is uncertain whether the third ship was built to the same design, or to the same overall dimensions but to a design prepared by Jacob Allin, the Surveyor of the Navy, where the depth in hold (the height of the underside of the lower deck above the floor of the hold) was deepened by 6in more than in the other two sloops.

Although initially armed with ten 4-pounder guns, this class was built with nine pairs of gunports on the upper deck (each port flanked by two pairs of row-ports), and the sloops in 1744 had their ordnance increased to fourteen guns. Baltimore, the only one of the three to survive beyond 1748, was converted into a bomb vessel in 1758.

== Vessels ==
Name	Ordered	Builder	Laid down	Launched	Completed	Fate
Baltimore	7 July 1742	Thomas West, Deptford	12 August 1742	30 December 1742	7 February 1743	Sold 16 December 1762
Saltash	19 July 1742	John Quallett, Rotherhithe	6 August 1742	30 December 1742	7 February 1743	Sunk 24 June 1746 off Beachy Head.
Drake	5 February 1743	John Buxton, Jnr., Deptford	11 February 1743	28 September 1743	17 August 1743	Sold 18 October 1748 at Deptford
