= Drake-class sloop =

Class overview
- Operators: Royal Navy
- Preceded by: Bonetta group
- Succeeded by: Wolf class
- Built: 1740-1741
- In commission: 1741-1756
- Completed: 3
- Lost: 2

General characteristics (common design)
- Type: Sloop-of-war
- Tons burthen: 201 66/94 bm
- Length: 85 ft 0 in (25.9 m) (gundeck); 68 ft 8 in (20.9 m) (keel)
- Beam: 23 ft 6 in (7.2 m)
- Depth of hold: 9 ft 6 in (2.90 m) (vessels without platform in hold)
- Sail plan: Snow
- Complement: 80 (100 from 1744)
- Armament: 8 (later 10) × 4-pounder guns; also 14 x ½-pounder swivel guns

The Drake class was a class of three sloops of wooden construction built for the Royal Navy during 1741. All were ordered in 1740, and were the first to be built by contract with commercial builders, although they were to a common design prepared by Jacob Acworth, the Surveyor of the Navy. They were the first new sloops to be built since the previous batch of eight in 1732 (which had all been built in the Royal Dockyards), but they closely followed the characteristics of their predecessors.

Although initially armed with eight 4-pounder guns, this class was built with seven pairs of gunports on the upper deck (each port flanked by two pairs of row-ports), and the two survivors in 1744 had their ordnance increased to ten guns.

== Construction ==
At the start of the War of Jenkins' Ear in 1739, the Royal Navy had a shortage of small combatant vessels to undertake the patrol and escort role; basically their only suitable vessels were the twelve 200-ton sloops built in the period from 1728 to 1732 in the Royal Dockyards, each armed with eight 3-pounder or 4-pounder guns. A large expansion in the number of sloops was urgently needed to cope with the requirements of convoy duties. Initially, three more sloops of 200 tons were ordered in 1740 as replacements for earlier sloops of the same names. A design was produced by the Surveyor of the Navy, and contracts were offered to merchant builders in the River Thames area. The first two were contracted at a price of £7-15-0d per ton (or £1,550 for 200 tons) and the third at a price of £7-7-6d per ton (or £1,475 for 200 tons). After launching all three vessels were taken to Deptford Dockyard for completion and fitting out there, at an additional cost of £1,593-8-8d for Drake, £1,505-11-11d for Hawk, and £1,626-15-6d for Swift.

== Vessels ==
Name	Ordered	Builder	Begun (keel laid)	Launched	Completed	Fate
Drake	24 June 1740	Thomas West, Wapping	25 September 1740	19 February 1741	4 April 1741	Wrecked 22 November 1742 in Gibraltar harbour.
Hawk	25 August 1740	Grevill & Whetstone, Limehouse	20 October 1740	10 March 1741	26 April 1741	Taken to pieces October 1747 at Deptford.
Swift	6 December 1740	Robert Carter, Limehouse	26 January 1741	30 May 1741	10 July 1741	Lost 31 October 1756
