= Wolf-class sloop =

Class overview
- Operators: Royal Navy
- Preceded by: Drake class
- Succeeded by: Baltimore class
- Built: 1741–1743
- In commission: 1742–1763
- Completed: 3
- Lost: 2

General characteristics (common design)
- Type: Sloop-of-war
- Tons burthen: 243 74/94 bm
- Length: 87 ft 6 in (26.7 m) (gundeck); 73 ft 4.75 in (22.4 m) (keel)
- Beam: 25 ft 0 in (7.6 m)
- Depth of hold: 10 ft 6 in (3.20 m) (Wolf); 11 ft 0 in (3.35 m) (Otter and Grampus)
- Sail plan: Snow
- Complement: 110
- Armament: 10 (later 14) × 4-pounder guns; also 12/14 x ½-pounder swivel guns

The Wolf class was a class of three sloops of wooden construction built for the Royal Navy during 1741–43. They were ordered in 1741, 1742 and 1743 respectively, and were the first to increase significantly in size from the 200 burthen tons which had been the normal size from 1728, to a larger 244 tons; they were to a common design prepared by Jacob Allin, the Master Shipwright at Deptford Dockyard (who was subsequently appointed in 1745 to share the post of Surveyor of the Navy).

These were all built by contract with Thames-side shipbuilders, each at a fixed price of £1,793.8.0d (or £7.7.0d per ton for a nominal 244 burthen tons). After launching, each was fitted out at a Royal Dockyards - Wolf at Deptford at a cost of ££1,653.12.2d, Otter also at Deptford at a cost of £1,582.8.7d, and Grampus at Woolwich Dockyard at a cost of £1,838.13.10d. They were two-masted vessels carrying a snow rig. For the latter two vessels, the design was modified by the addition of 6 inches to their depth in hold.

Although initially armed with ten 4-pounder guns, this class was built with eight pairs of gunports on the upper deck (each port flanked by two pairs of row-ports), and the two survivors in 1744 had their ordnance increased to fourteen guns.

== Vessels ==
Name	Ordered	Builder	Laid down	Launched	Completed	Fate
Wolf	21 July 1741	Thomas West, Deptford	31 July 1741	27 February 1742	15 April 1742	Wrecked 31 December 1748 in Dundrum Bay (with 109 men drowned).
Otter	23 January 1742	John Buxton, Jnr., Rotherhithe	February 1742	19 August 1742	13 September 1742	Sold 16 June 1763 at Deptford to break up.
Grampus	5 February 1743	Philemon Perry, Blackwall	15 February 1743	27 July 1743	8 September 1743	Captured by the French 30 September 1744 in the Bay of Biscay.
