= Trysail =

Small sail for high winds

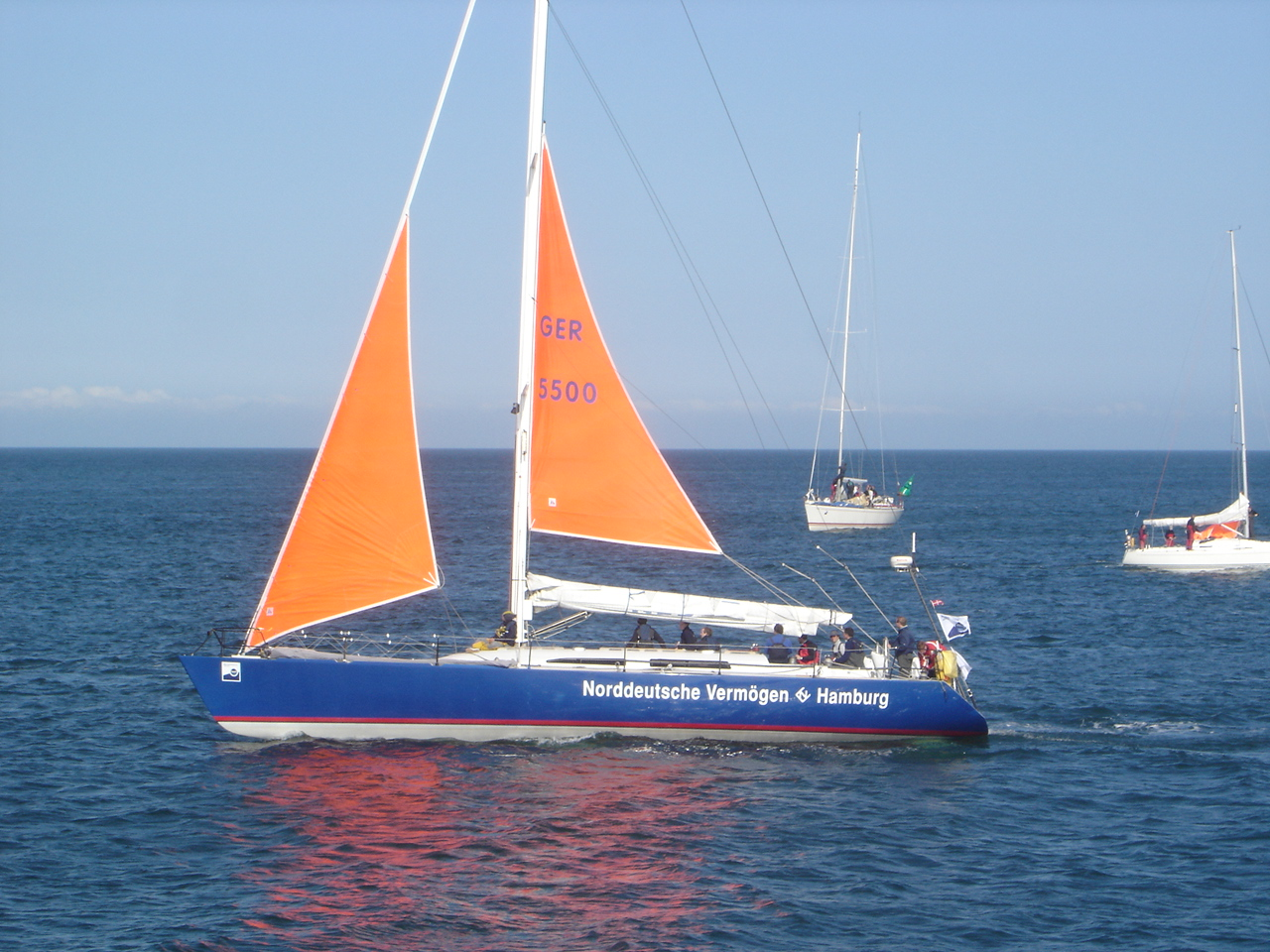
A modern yacht with a trysail set

A trysail is a small triangular or gaff rigged sail hoisted in place of a larger mainsail when winds are very high. The trysail provides enough thrust to maintain control of the ship, e.g. to avoid ship damage, and to keep the bow to the wind. It is hoisted abaft (i.e., directly behind) the mainmast (taking the place of the much larger mainsail) or, on a brig, abaft the foremast. A trysail is analogous to a storm jib. A related fore-and-aft sail known as a spencer was adopted on the foremast of brigs in place of a main staysail, a development first noted during the 1830s.

== Royal Navy usage ==
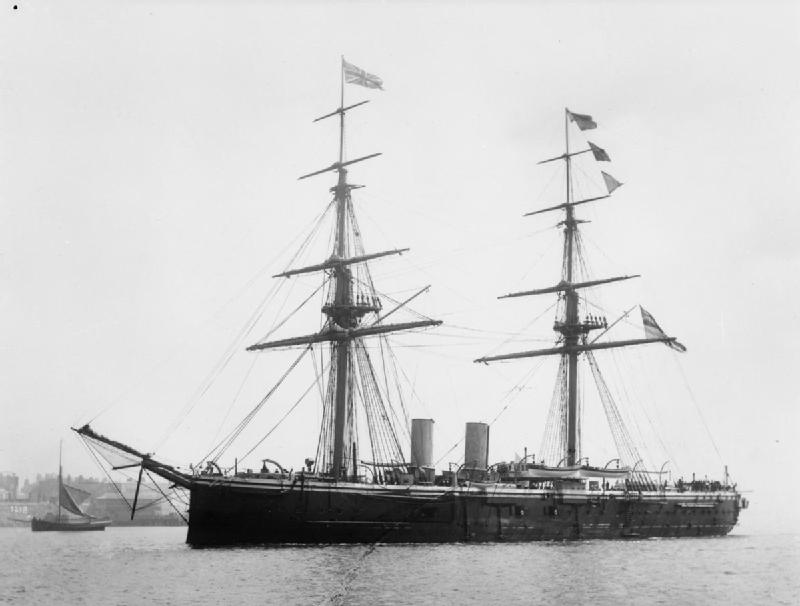
The ironclad HMS Temeraire; her trysail yards can be seen behind the masts.

In the Royal Navy in the late nineteenth century, the term 'trysail' came to denote the main fore-and-aft sail on any mast. This included the mainsail of the 'great brig' HMS Temeraire, the largest fore-and-aft sail ever used by a warship. Naval trysails were usually gaff-rigged and 'loose-footed', with a spar along the head but no boom, and small auxiliary trysails continued in intermittent use into the 1920s for seakeeping and station-keeping.

== Sources ==
- Sleight, Steve (1999). The Complete Sailing Manual. ISBN 0-7894-4606-5.
- Ballard, G.A. (1943). The Great Brig. HMS Temeraire, 1875 (The Mariner's Mirror ed.). pp. 149–162.
