= List of ship launches in 1777 =

The list of ship launches in 1777 includes a chronological list of some ships launched in 1777.

Date	Ship	Class	Builder	Location	Country	Notes
1 January	Swift	Swan-class ship sloop	Edward Hunt	Portsmouth Dockyard	Great Britain	For Royal Navy.
10 February	Dispatch	Swan-class ship sloop	John Williams	Deptford Dockyard	Great Britain	For Royal Navy.
25 March	Ceres	Sloop of war	Nicholas Phillips	Woolwich Dockyard	Great Britain	For Royal Navy.
26 March	Cameleon	Swan-class ship sloop	John Randall	Rotherhithe	Great Britain	For Royal Navy.
2 April	Sedmoi	Platyi-class frigate	S. I. Afanaseyev	Novokhoperskaya	Russia	For Imperial Russian Navy.
7 April	Argus	Galley	Samuel Robins	Pennsylvania	United States	For Pennsylvania State Navy.
8 April	Zebra	Swan-class ship sloop	John Barnard	Ipswich	Great Britain	For Royal Navy.
24 April	Pelican	Porcupine-class post ship	Adams & Barnard	Deptford	Great Britain	For Royal Navy.
8 May	Harpy	Sloop of war	John Fisher	Liverpool	Great Britain	For Royal Navy.
10 May	Ranger	Sloop-of-war	James Hackett	Kittery, Maine	United States	For Continental Navy.
23 May	Vestal	Sphinx-class ship sloop	John Henslow	Plymouth Dockyard	Great Britain	For Royal Navy.
7 June	Aurora	Enterprise-class frigate	John Perry & Co.	Blackwall Yard	Great Britain	For Royal Navy.
7 June	Rattlesnake	Alert-class Cutter (boat)	Thomas Farley	Folkestone	Great Britain	For Royal Navy.
24 June	Alert	Alert-class Cutter (boat)	Henry Ladd	Dover	Great Britain	For Royal Navy.
5 July	Caton	Third rate	Joseph-Marie Blaise Coulomb	Toulon	Kingdom of France	For French Navy.
7 July	Ariel	Sphinx-class post ship	John Perry & Co.	Blackwall Yard	Great Britain	For Royal Navy.
7 July	Proserpine	Enterprise-class frigate	John Barnard	Harwich	Great Britain	For Royal Navy.
4 August	Sprightly	Sprightly-class Cutter (boat)	Thomas King	Dover	Great Britain	For Royal Navy.
5 August	America	Intrepid-class ship of the line	Adam Hayes	Deptford Dockyard	Great Britain	For Royal Navy.
18 August	Nymphe	Nymphe-class frigate	Pierre-Augustin Lamothe Kercaradec	Brest	Kingdom of France	For French Navy.
20 August	Formidable	Barfleur-class ship of the line		Chatham Dockyard	Great Britain	For Royal Navy.
30 August	Charmante	Charmante-class frigate		Brest	Kingdom of France	For French Navy.
1 September	Sibylle	Sibylle-class frigate	Jacques-Noël Sané	Brest	Kingdom of France	For French Navy.
2 September	Justitia	Prindsesse Sophia Frederica-class ship of the line	Henrik Gerner	Copenhagen	Denmark-Norway	For Dano-Norwegian Navy.
3 September	Concorde	Fifth rate		Rochefort	Kingdom of France	For French Navy.
3 September	Lion	Worcester-class ship of the line	Edward Hunt	Portsmouth Dockyard	Great Britain	For Royal Navy.
16 October	Iphigénie	Iphigénie-class frigate	Gilles Cambry	Lorient	Kingdom of France	For French Navy.
18 October	Duke	Duke-class ship of the line		Plymouth Dockyard	Great Britain	For Royal Navy.
21 October	Destin	César-class ship of the line	La Frete Bernard	Toulon	Kingdom of France	For French Navy.
23 October	Santa Monica	Sixth rate		Cartagena	Spain	For Spanish Navy.
October	Royal George	East Indiaman	Randall, Gray & Brent	Rotherhithe	Great Britain	For British East India Company.
18 November	Andromeda	Enterprise-class frigate	Robert Fabian	East Cowes	Great Britain	For Royal Navy.
November	Indien	Indien-class frigate	Jacques Boux	Amsterdam	Dutch Republic	For French Navy.
17 December	Porcupine	Porcupine-class post ship	Edward Greaves	Limehouse	Great Britain	For Royal Navy.
17 December	Romulus	Roebuck-class ship	Adams	Bucklers Hard	Great Britain	For Royal Navy.
24 December	Andromaque	Nymphe-class frigate	Pierre-Augustin Lamothe Kercaradec	Brest, France	Kingdom of France	For French Navy.
Unknown date	Aggie	Merchantman		Liverpool	Great Britain	For R. Wicksted.
Unknown date	Baltimore	Brigantine		Baltimore, Maryland	United States	For Continental Navy.
Unknown date	Brazil	East Indiaman		Bombay	India	For British East India Company.
Unknown date	Bulloch	Galley			United States	For Georgia State Navy.
Unknown date	Champion	Xebec			United States	For Continental Navy.
Unknown date	Chapman	Merchantman	Thomas Fishburn	Whitby	Great Britain	For Abel Chapman.
Unknown date	Feyz-i Hüda	Fourth rate		Constantinople	Ottoman Empire	For Ottoman Navy.
Unknown date	General Nash	Privateer		North Carolina	United States	For John Wright Stanley.
Unknown date	Governor Trumbull	Privateer		Norwich, Connecticut	United States	For Howland, Coit, et al.
Unknown date	Grosvenor	East Indiaman	John Wells	Deptford	Great Britain	For British East India Company.
Unknown date	Hediyyetü Müluk	Fourth rate		Thassos	Ottoman Greece	For Ottoman Navy.
Unknown date	Hercules	West Indiaman			Province of Georgia	For private owner.
Unknown date	Lady Juliana	Merchantman	Stephenson & Co.	Whitby	Great Britain	For private owner.
Unknown date	Lark	Cutter	Nicholas Bools	Bridport	Great Britain	For Arlot & Co.
Unknown date	Laurel	Cutter	Nicholas Bools	Bridport	Great Britain	For Bravell Friend.
Unknown date	Lee	Galley			United States	For Georgia State Navy.
Unknown date	Lynx	sloop of war	John Randall	Rotherhithe	Great Britain	For Royal Navy.
Unknown date	Musquito	Gunboat		Michigan	(Kingdom of Great Britain) Province of Quebec	For Royal Navy.
Unknown date	Pocahontas	Privateer		Rappahannock River	United States	For private owner.
Unknown date	Rainbow	Merchantman			United States	For private owner.
Unknown date	Peleng-i Bahri	Third rate		Sinop	Ottoman Empire	For Ottoman Navy.
Unknown date	Royal Admiral	East Indiaman	William Barnard	Deptford	Great Britain	For British East India Company.
Unknown date	Santa Ammonica	Frigate		Carthagena	Spain	For Spanish Navy.
Unknown date	Swallow	East Indiaman		Bombay	India	For British East India Company.
Unknown date	Swallow	Cutter	Nicholas Bools	Bridport	Great Britain	For Carter & Co.
Unknown date	Tromp	Fourth rate	P. van Zwijndregt	Rotterdam	Dutch Republic	For Dutch Navy.
Unknown date	Name unknown	Merchantman			Kingdom of France	For private owner.
Unknown date	Name unknown	Merchantman			United States	For private owner.
