= HMS Cygnet (1776) =

Sloop of the Royal Navy

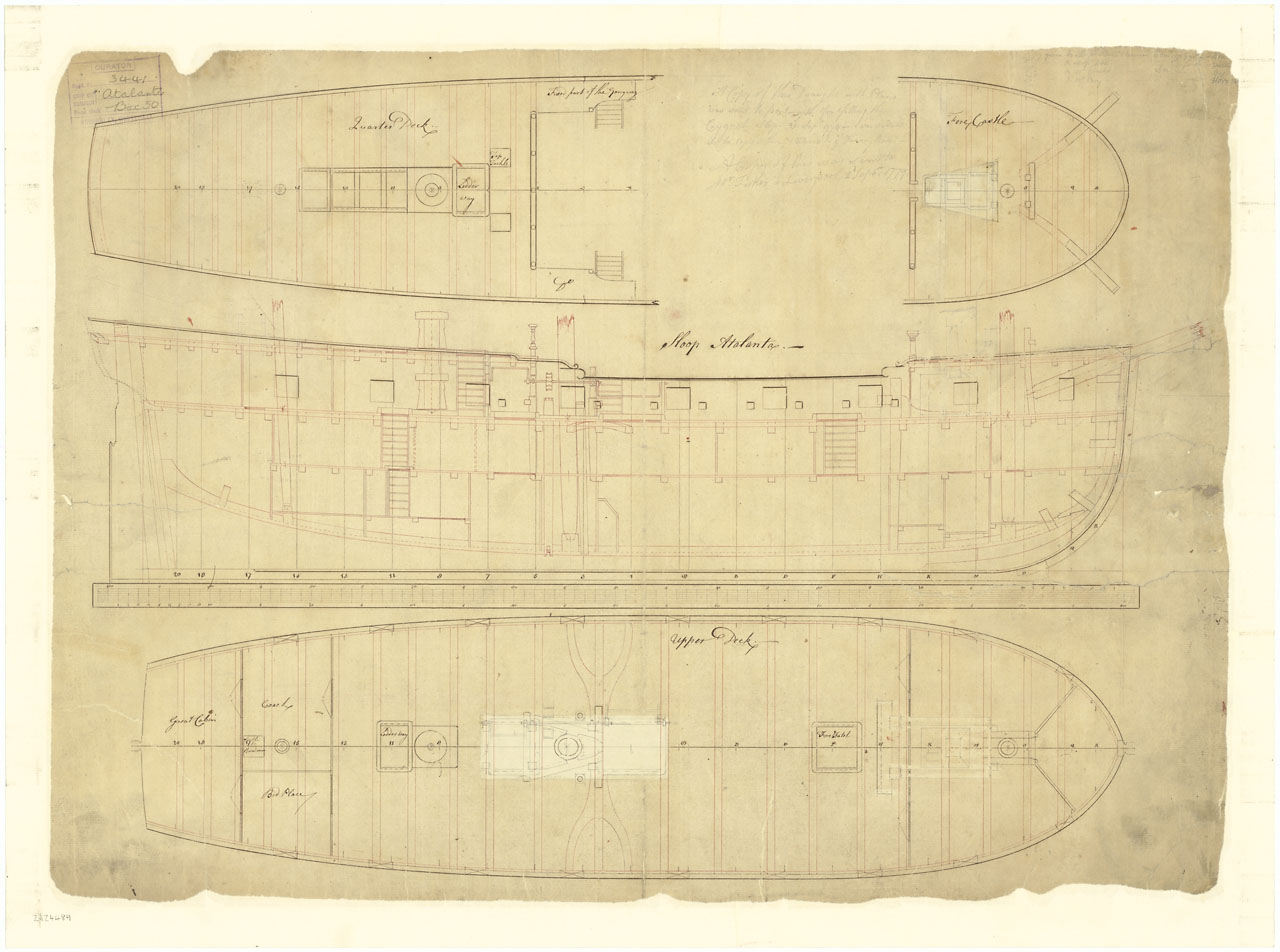
- Cygnet

History

Great Britain
- Name: HMS Cygnet
- Ordered: 15 April 1773
- Builder: Portsmouth Dockyard
- Laid down: November 1773
- Launched: 24 January 1776
- Commissioned: December 1775
- Fate: Sold August 1802

General characteristics
- Class & type: Swan-class ship-sloop
- Tons burthen: 301 50/94 bm
- Length: 96 ft 7 in (29.4 m) (gundeck); 78 ft 8.75 in (24.0 m) (keel)
- Beam: 26 ft 10 in (8.2 m)
- Depth of hold: 12 ft 10 in (3.91 m)
- Complement: 125
- Armament: 14 × 6-pounder guns; 2 more added ca. 1780

HMS Cygnet was a 14-gun ship-sloop of the Royal Navy's Swan class, launched on 24 January 1776. She served during both the American Revolutionary War and the French Revolutionary War before being sold for disposal in 1802.
