= HMS Amazon (1773) =

British naval frigate (1773–1794)

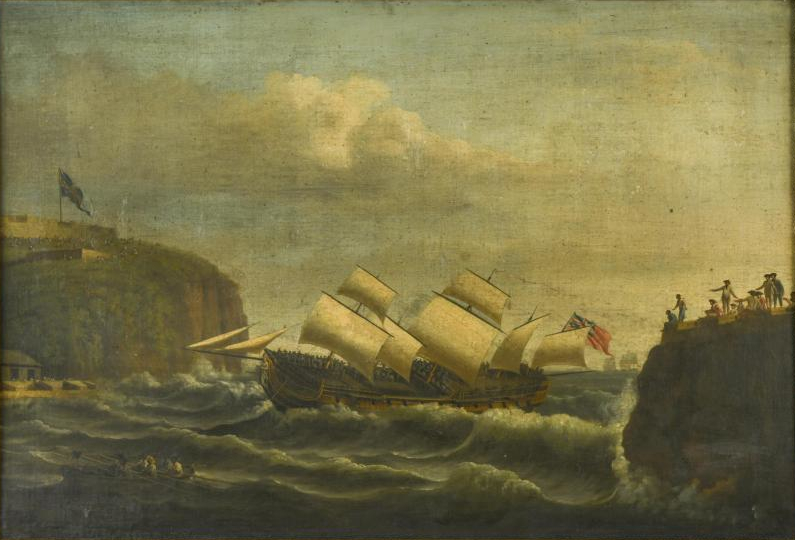
- The Amazon entering the Harbour of St Lucia, a painting by John Thomas Serres

History

Great Britain
- Name: HMS Amazon
- Ordered: 25 December 1770
- Builder: Rotherhithe
- Laid down: 1771
- Launched: 1773
- Commissioned: 1777
- Fate: Broken up 1794

General characteristics as built
- Class & type: 32-gun fifth-rate Amazon-class frigate (1773) frigate
- Length: 126 ft 4 in (38.51 m) (gundeck); 104 ft 6 in (31.85 m) (keel)
- Beam: 35 ft 2 in (10.72 m)
- Draught: 8 ft 8 in (2.64 m) (forwards); 12 ft 10 in (3.91 m) (aft)
- Depth of hold: 12 ft 2 1/2 in (3.721 m)
- Sail plan: Full-rigged ship
- Complement: 220
- Armament: Upper deck: 26 × 12-pounder guns; QD: 4 × 6-pounder guns + 4 × 18-pounder carronades; Fc: 2 × 6-pounder guns + 2 × 18-pounder carronades

HMS Amazon was a 32-gun fifth-rate frigate of the Royal Navy, armed with a main battery of twenty-six 12 pounders (5.4 kilograms) and launched at Rotherhithe shipyard in 1773. She was first commissioned in February 1776 for war in America where she took part in operations against New York. Returning to England in February 1779, Amazon underwent a refit before serving in the English Channel and North Sea. In April 1780, she sailed to the Leeward Islands where, in October, she was almost wrecked in a hurricane.

Amazon was in Samuel Hood's squadron on 29 April 1781, when it engaged the French fleet under François Joseph Paul de Grasse at the Battle of Fort Royal. In May 1781, she was part of a squadron under Francis Samuel Drake, which arrived too late to prevent the capture of Tobago. After further service in the Leeward Islands and North American waters, Amazon sailed to England, reaching Portsmouth in February 1782, where she paid off. Taken to Plymouth in 1784, Amazon was fitted for ordinary. She was used there as a receiving ship in 1791 and was broken up in June 1794.

== Design, construction and armament ==
HMS Amazon was one of the first series of three Amazon-class sailing frigate constructed for the Royal Navy between 1771 and 1773, from a design by John Williams. Built by John and William Wells & Co., Amazon was ordered on 25 December 1770 and her keel was laid down in April 1771 at Rotherhithe shipyard.

Launched on 2 November 1773, her dimensions were: 126 feet 4 inches (38.5 metres) along the gun deck, 104 ft 6 in (31.9 m) at the keel, with a beam of 35 ft 2 in (10.7 m) and a depth in hold of 12 ft 2 1/2 in (3.7 m). This made her 687 39/94 tons (bm). She would carry a complement of 220 men when fully manned.

Classed as a 32-gun fifth rate, Amazon was armed with a main battery of twenty-six 12 pounders (5.4 kilograms) on her gun deck, four 6 pdr (2.7 kg) on the quarterdeck and two on the forecastle. She also carried 6 18 pdr (8.16 kg) carronades, short lightweight guns with a large bore. They were cheaper to produce and much easier to handle than the equivalent long gun but lacked the accuracy and range. Four were carried on Amazon's quarterdeck and two on her forecastle. (Note: The gun-rating of a vessel was the number of long guns it was designed to carry and did not always match its actual armament. Before 1817, carronades were not counted at all unless they were direct replacements for long guns.)

== Service ==
Amazon was first commissioned in February 1776 under Captain Maximillian Jacobs. On 26 June, she left for North America where she took part in operations against New York. On 5 June 1777 she, HMS Juno, and HMS Orpheus recaptured privateer brig "Lucy" 15 Leagues off Nantucket. She returned home in February 1779 and paid off. Recommissioned under Captain William Finch in April, Amazon was refitted at Chatham. The work included the addition of copper sheathing to her hull and took until July. In mid-1799, she joined Admiral Sir Charles Hardy's fleet in the English Channel but by December, had transferred to the North Sea.

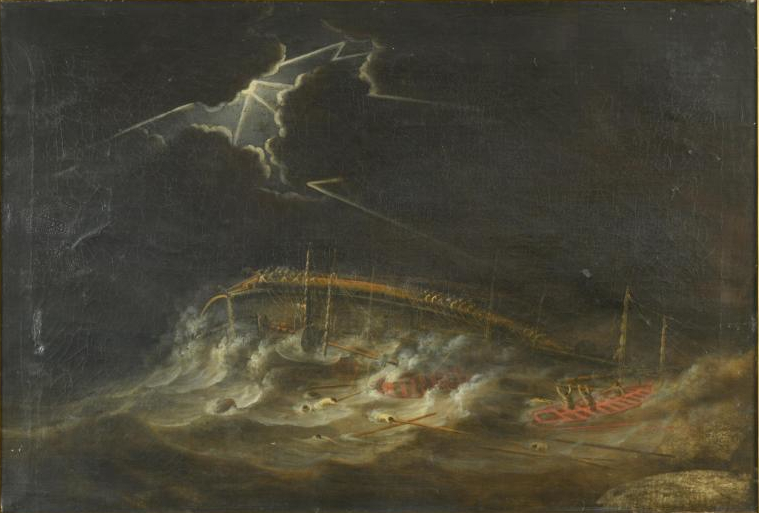
Amazon on her side during a hurricane in October 1780

Amazon sailed for the West Indies on 8 April 1780, where she joined Admiral George Rodney's fleet in July. In mid-October 1780, Amazon was caught in a hurricane off St. Lucia. She was blown onto her side and held there for several hours during which time a great deal of her crew, who were trapped below deck, drowned. Others were washed overboard. By cutting away the masts, she was saved from being wrecked and was sailed into English Harbour under a jury rig.

Amazon was in Samuel Hood's squadron on 29 April 1781, when it engaged the French fleet under François Joseph Paul de Grasse at the Battle of Fort Royal. The previous day, Amazon had spotted a superior enemy fleet comprising 19 ships-of-the-line, two two-deckers, several frigates and a large convoy of merchant ships off Point Salines, Grenada. She sent a signal, which was repeated by Russell, to Hood in Barfleur. In response, Hood had his ships form line of battle. Grasse ordered his fleet to prepare for action on the morning of 29 April, and sailed for Fort Royal. The French spotted Hood's fleet bearing towards them around 0800, but de Grasse held the weather gage and declined to engage. A long-range running battle ensued in which the French convoy escaped to Martinique. Freed from the responsibility to the ships he was escorting, and having now been joined by the previously blockaded ships-of-the-line off Fort de France, de Grasse made attempts to bring Hood's fleet to action but was prevented from doing so by the light winds. Several days of sporadic action, in which at one point Amazon was sent to tow Paccahunta out of range, proved indecisive and both fleets retired on 31 April.

Suspecting an attack on Tobago in May 1781, Rodney dispatched a squadron, which included Amazon, under Francis Samuel Drake to aid in its defence. Drake arrived on 30 May to be met by de Grasse's fleet. Drake refused to engage and retreated to Barbados. He arrived on 3 June, prompting Rodney to sail for Tobago with his entire fleet. The British arrived the following day to discover the island had been taken and so returned to Barbados.

Amazon spent some time in Jamaica before being recommissioned under captain Richard Bickerton in July 1781. After further service in the Leeward Islands and North American waters, Bickerton sailed Amazon to England. She arrived in Portsmouth in February 1782, where she paid off. Taken to Plymouth in 1784, Amazon was fitted for ordinary. She served there as a receiving ship in 1791 and was broken up in June 1794.

== Paintings by John Serres ==
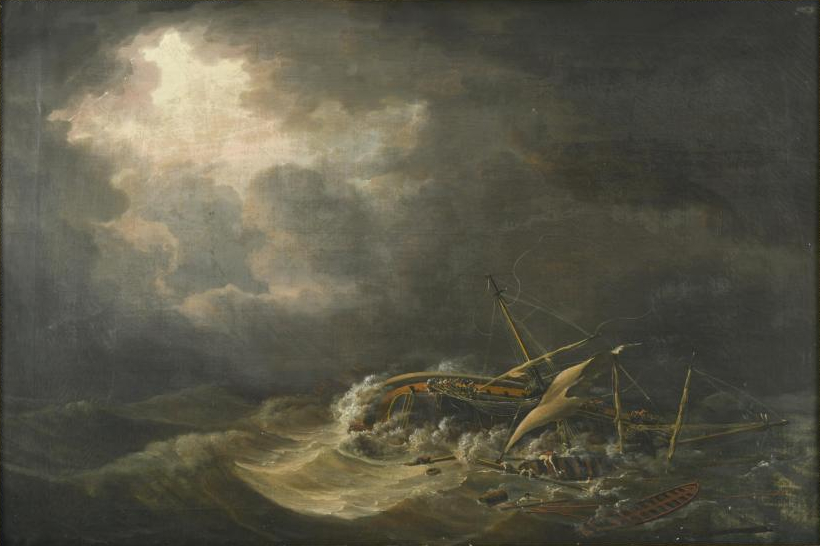
The Amazon in a hurricane

William Clement Finch, who commanded Amazon during the hurricane of 1780, commissioned John Thomas Serres to paint a set of three pictures recording the events in the Caribbean. Finch, the third son of Heneage Finch, 3rd Earl of Aylesford, would later end his career as a rear-admiral.
