= HMS Perseus (1776) =

Sphinx-class post-ship of the Royal Navy

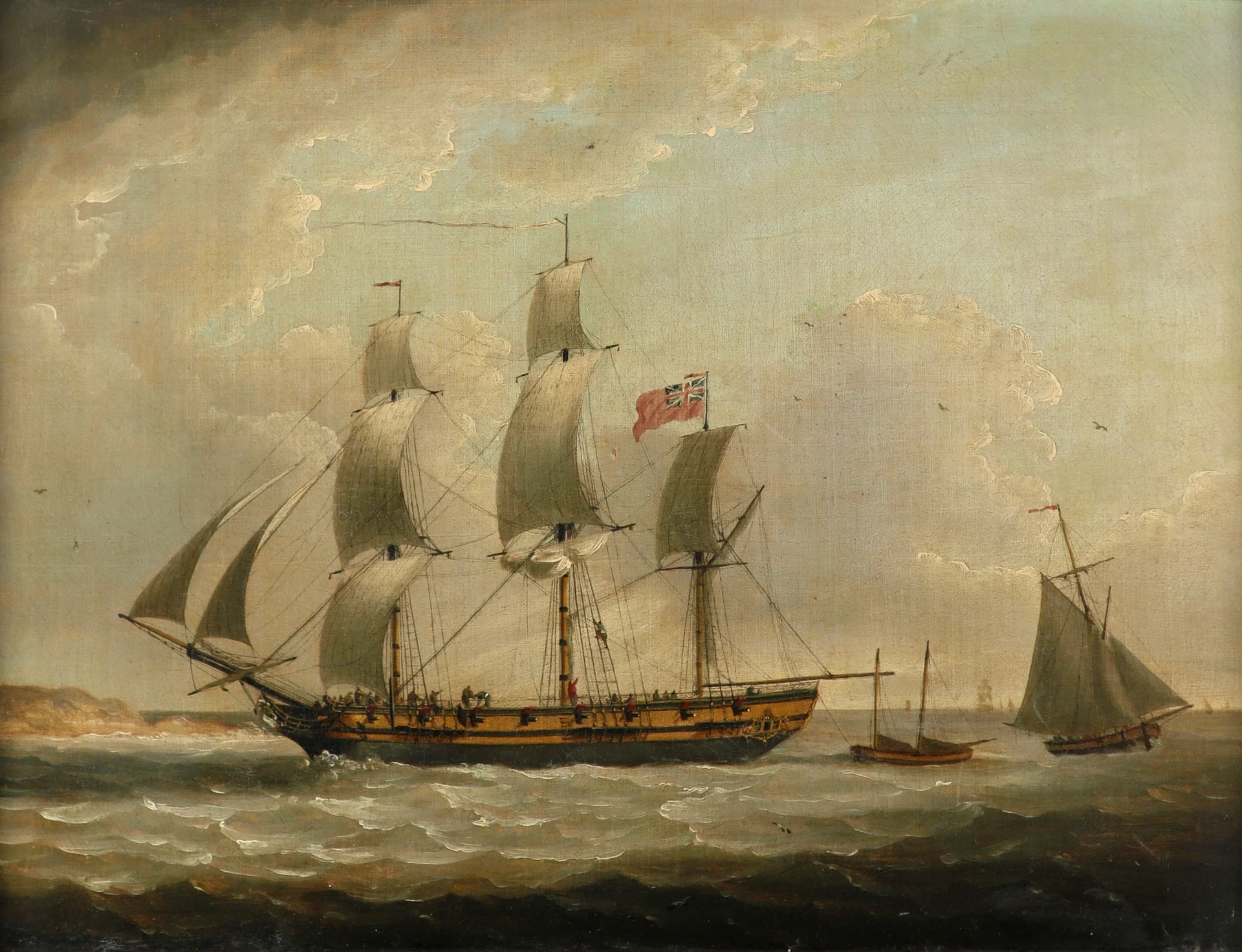
- Perseus' sister ship HMS Camilla

History

Great Britain
- Name: HMS Perseus
- Ordered: 30 October 1775
- Builder: John Randal and Company, Rotherhithe
- Laid down: November 1775
- Launched: 20 March 1776
- Completed: 26 May 1776 at Deptford Dockyard
- Commissioned: March 1776
- Decommissioned: September 1805
- Reclassified: Bomb vessel in 1798
- Honours and awards: Siege of Charleston, 1780
- Fate: Broken up at Sheerness Dockyard, September 1805

General characteristics
- Class & type: 20-gun sixth-rate Sphinx-class post ship
- Tons burthen: 43188/94 bm
- Length: 108 ft 1 in (32.9 m) (gun deck); 89 ft 6.5 in (27.3 m) (keel)
- Beam: 30 ft 1.5 in (9.2 m)
- Depth of hold: 9 ft 8 in (2.9 m)
- Sail plan: Full-rigged ship
- Complement: 140
- Armament: 20-26 guns comprising: Upper deck: 20 × 9-pounder guns; Quarterdeck: 4 × 12-pounder carronades (from 1794); Forecastle: 2 × 12-pounder carronades (from 1794)

HMS Perseus was a 20-gun Sphinx-class sixth-rate post ship of the Royal Navy. Commissioned in March 1776, she cruised against privateers during the American War of Independence and in 1794 was refitted as a bomb vessel, which increased her armament to 26 guns. In this role Perseus served in the French Revolutionary Wars from 1794 to 1801. Following the Peace of Amiens in 1802 she was decommissioned and subsequently broken up at Sheerness Dockyard in September 1805.

== Service ==
Launched and commissioned in March 1776, Perseus' early duties were as a hunter of American and French privateers which were disrupting British merchant trade off the coast of North America. In this role she secured five victories at sea over enemy vessels. on 16 June, 1778 she captured French snow "Bonite" (or "Bonette" or "Bonetta") 150 leagues of Charles Town, South Carolina, later recaptured by the French. In 1780 she was part of the British naval forces engaged in the six-week Siege of Charleston which culminated in the surrender of the American garrison. Returning to her previous role, Perseus secured another three victories over privateers before she was paid off and decommissioned at the conclusion of the War in 1782.

Recommissioned for peacetime service in 1783, Perseus assisted in protecting British merchant vessels in the English Channel and Irish Sea, but was repeatedly forced from service for refit and repair. In the lead up to the French Revolutionary Wars, Perseus was refitted as a bomb vessel capable to conducting naval bombardment of French ports. Despite her change of role, Perseus secured one further vitory at sea over an enemy privateer, capturing the 16-gun San Lion in 1798. A year later she was part of Royal Navy squadrons in action against land-based targets, off Alexandria during the British response to France's Egyptian Campaign, and against the French-aligned Parthenopean Republic in southern Italy. In 1803 she was also engaged in the Royal Navy's blockade and bombardment of the French port of Dieppe.

Decommissioned at the conclusion of the French Revolutionary Wars, she was broken up for scrap at Sheerness Dockyard in September 1805.

== Bibliography ==
- Winfield, Rif (2007). British Warships of the Age of Sail 1714–1792: Design, Construction, Careers and Fates. Seaforth. ISBN 9781844157006.
