= Edward Edwards (Royal Navy officer) =

Royal Navy Admiral (c. 1742–1815)

- Born: c. 1742; Walter Newton, England
- Died: 13 April 1815 (aged c. 73); Stamford, Lincolnshire
- Military career
- Allegiance: United Kingdom
- Branch: Royal Navy
- Service years: 1746–1815
- Rank: Admiral
- Commands: HMS Carcass; HMS Hornet; HMS Narcisuss; HMS Pandora
- Conflicts: Seven Years' War; American Revolutionary War; Battle of St. Lucia; French Revolutionary War

Edward Edwards (c. 1742 – 13 April 1815) was a British naval officer best known as the captain of HMS Pandora, the frigate which the Admiralty sent to the South Pacific in pursuit of the Bounty mutineers.

== Biography ==
=== Early years ===
The fifth of six children, Edward Edwards was born in Water Newton, a village near Peterborough, to Richard Edwards of Water Newton and Mary Fuller of Caldicot. He was born in about 1742 and christened in St Remegius' Church, Water Newton. He never married.

On 7 September 1759, age 17, he was commissioned as a lieutenant. To qualify for this commission he would have been required, in addition to passing a lieutenant's exam, to produce evidence of at least six years of sea time. No documents have been located to date which would establish exactly when, and under whose patronage, he started his naval career. It is likely he first went to sea as a captain's servant when about 10 years old and subsequently completed at least part of the required sea time as a midshipman. A signature, 'Edwd Edwards', inscribed on a document witnessing the Will of one Isaac Bishopbridge serving "on Board His Majestys Ship of Warr the Devonshire," suggests that Edwards may have sailed under Captain John Moore on HMS Devonshire in April 1756.

His naval career after he was commissioned included service in the following ships, before being appointed to Pandora:

- HMS Nassau, a 64-gun third rate, as fourth lieutenant
- HMS Lowestoffe, a 32-gun fifth rate, as second lieutenant
- HMS Zephyr, a 14-gun sloop, as first lieutenant, under Captain J. Inglis
- HMS Ferret, a 14-gun sloop, as first lieutenant
- HMS Active, a 28-gun sixth rate, as second lieutenant
- HMS Pembroke, a 60-gun fourth rate, as third lieutenant, later promoted to first lieutenant
- HMS Augusta, a 64-gun third rate, as first lieutenant, under Captain Francis Reynolds (later the Earl of Ducie)
- HMS Carcass, an 8-gun bomb vessel, 22 April 1778 – 5 December 1780, commanding officer
- HMS Hornet, a 14-gun sloop, commanding officer; service in the Caribbean. Promoted to post captain on 25 April 1781, and transferred to command HMS Narcissus
- HMS Narcissus, a 20-gun sixth rate, (25 May 1781), paid off on 27 March 1784

=== Pandora and the Bounty ===
He spent the following six years on half-pay after the end of the American Revolutionary war; until 6 August 1790, when he was appointed to take command of the frigate Pandora. He received new orders on 11 August to prepare his new command for a journey to "remote parts", on a mission in pursuit of the Bounty mutineers.

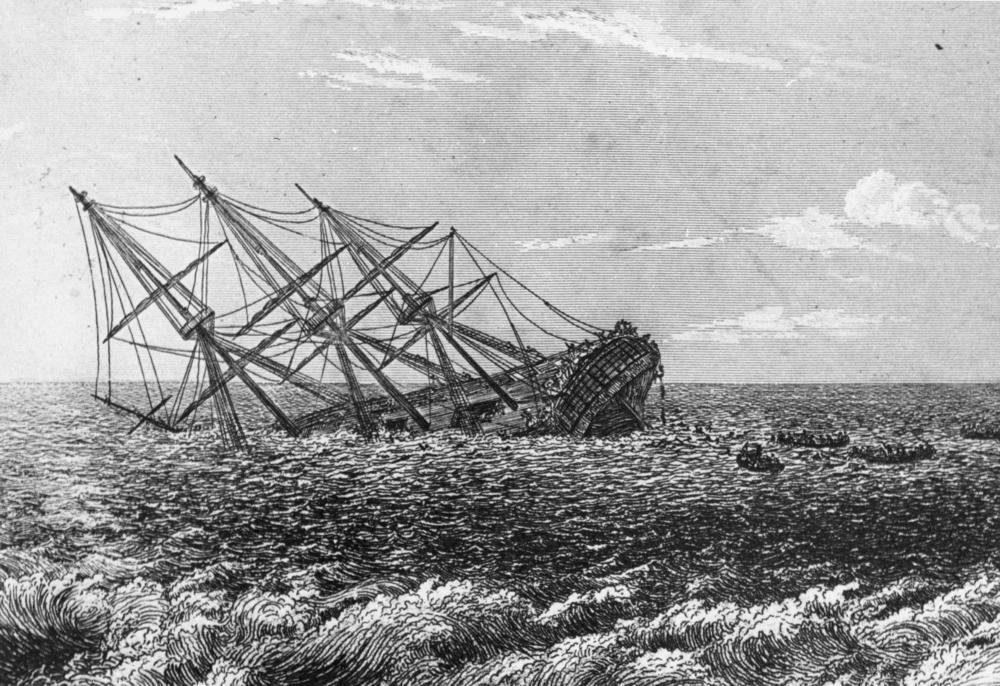
HMS Pandora foundering, 29 August 1791; 1831 etching by Robert Batty, from a sketch by Heywood

With the help of former Bounty midshipman Thomas Hayward - a Bligh loyalist recently returned to England from the South Pacific - Edwards succeeded in finding fourteen men (Bligh had stated that four of these were loyal but could not be accommodated on the over-full launch with the other loyal men; so Edwards found ten mutineers). The ship finally sailed on 8 May, to search for Christian and Bounty among the thousands of southern Pacific islands. At Tubai a Bounty anchor was recovered by Pandora. Apart from a few spars discovered at Palmerston Island, no traces of the fugitive vessel were found. Edwards continued the search until August, when he turned west and headed for the Dutch East Indies. Ironically, a set of islands the Pandora sailed to but did not land at were the Pitcairn Islands; had he checked his charts and found that this uncharted island was at the correct latitude but wrong longitude for Pitcairn Island, he could very well have fulfilled his mission of taking into custody the last nine Bounty mutineers.

The Pandora foundered on the Great Barrier Reef on 29 August 1791 during the journey home from the South Pacific. Four of the ten mutineers and 31 of Pandora's crew died in the destruction of the ship. After an arduous open boat voyage from the wreck to Timor and on to Batavia (Jakarta), only 78 men of Pandora's original 134-strong crew eventually reached England, accompanied by six mutineers and four loyalists. For Hayward this was the second time in as many years that he had found himself in an open boat making for a safe haven in the Dutch East Indies.

Edwards was court-martialed on 17 September 1792 for the loss of the Pandora. Immediately prior to the proceedings, he submitted to the Admiralty his account of the events leading up to the sinking. All of his officers supported Edwards' contention that the frigate had been lost due to circumstances beyond anyone's control.

The court-martial was attended by William Dillon, then a midshipman, who later became a vice-admiral in the Royal Navy and described Edwards in his memoirs as a "fine, venerable-looking officer. His appearance completely absorbed all my attention during the trial, and I felt an inward satisfaction at the result, after all the hardships and dangers he had overcome".

Captain Edwards and his officers were exonerated. Edwards subsequently served for a few years as a 'regulating' captain (recruiting officer) in Argyll and Hull and then resigned himself to inactivity on the half pay list. However, he was promoted to vice-admiral in 1809 and eventually ended his career as Admiral of the White, titularly the third most senior officer in the Royal Navy. He died in his native place - Stamford, Lincolnshire - aged 73, in 1815. Edwards was buried in St Remigius Church in Water Newton, a village in Huntingdonshire.

His reputation and character were effectively blackened by members of the Heywood family, who were unable to forgive him for what they perceived as excessively harsh treatment of their son, Bounty midshipman Peter Heywood, who was tried and convicted as a mutineer and pardoned. Yet Edwards had staunch supporters among other officers who had served under his command and he was also remembered by his niece as a "sweet old man", often out on a walk in the country lanes around his native Water Newton and Uppingham where he owned several farms. According to an obituary in the Lincoln, Stamford & Rutland Mercury (21 April 1815), he suffered for the rest of his life from the effects of the hardships he endured during the open boat voyage to Timor after the loss of the Pandora. This could be the reason the Admiralty never appointed him to a seagoing command after his court-martial in 1792.

== Legacy ==
Notwithstanding his niece's fond memories, Edwards' conduct on the Pandora has been regarded in some circles as every bit as cruel as popular opinion claims that William Bligh was on the Bounty. Edwards, as ordered, kept his captives in close confinement, as if they had already been convicted, in spite of the fact that four of them had been identified by Bligh as being innocent and were subsequently acquitted at the court martial in Portsmouth.

Edwards was accused of being excessively callous when it came to the captives' well-being - for instance by refusing to let them use an old sail to prevent them from being sunburned on a sand cay, and also by collectively referring to, and treating them all as mutineers and pirates. Indeed, one of his officers, Lieutenant John Larkan (1746–1830), is alleged to have been "brutal" to the prisoners, which Edwards allegedly condoned.

One of Edwards' main detractors was Commodore Sir Thomas Pasley, uncle of convicted mutineer Peter Heywood, whose measured tone in one of his letters to Heywood leaves no doubt about his disapproval of 'that fellow' Edwards; he was especially critical of the prisoners' confinement in 'Pandora's Box'. Pasley omits to mention how he would have handled the situation had command been his. Presumably he might have occasionally let the prisoners out of their captivity location; thus, midshipmen Stewart and Heywood might have been allowed to spend some time walking the quarterdeck, as Peter Heywood was permitted to do after his transhipment to HMS Gorgon in Cape Town during the last stage of his voyage home. Much was made of this by Heywood's friends and defenders during his court martial, as if to underscore their plea that Edwards' conduct towards the prisoners had been excessively harsh and that Heywood had already suffered disproportionately and therefore had, in fact, already been punished.

Most damningly, Edwards is often accused of excessive callousness towards the prisoners by keeping all of them locked up in the prison cell after the frigate had run aground. Moreover, besides the fact that three prisoners were immediately ordered out of the cell to help the crew man the pumps; while several hours later, after the decision had been made to abandon ship because she could not be saved, it is not certain that Edwards gave orders to release the remaining eleven prisoners. Some saved themselves only because Joseph Hodges, the armourer's mate, knocked off the prisoners irons, but he was not able to complete the job because the ship sank very quickly. Although the shuttle closing the cell had been taken off by one of the crewmen at the last minute as the ship was foundering, four prisoners were nevertheless drowned.

Even though six of the captives were found guilty of mutiny, only three of them – Millward, Burkitt and Ellison – were eventually executed; William Muspratt was acquitted on a legal technicality and the remaining two, Peter Heywood and James Morrison were subsequently pardoned by the King.

Edwards' search for the mutiny ringleaders ultimately proved fruitless, but his voyages might have provided clues to the fate of one of the 18th century's greatest mysteries, the fate of the Lapérouse expedition. When passing Vanikoro, Santa Cruz Islands in the Pacific Ocean on 13 August 1791, smoke signals were observed rising from the island. However Edwards, who was only interested in prisoners, reasoned that mutineers fearful of discovery would not be advertising their whereabouts, so he ignored the smoke and sailed on. Sven Wahlroos, in his 1989 book, Mutiny and Romance in the South Seas, suggests that the smoke signals were almost certainly a distress message sent by survivors of the Lapérouse expedition, which later evidence indicated were still alive on Vanikoro at that time; three years after the Boussole and Astrolabe had foundered in 1788.

An islet on Ducie Atoll, in the Pitcairn Islands, is named after him.

== The Bryant Escapees ==
On 5 June 1791 a small boat carrying Mary and William Bryant, their two children Charlotte (aged three) and Emanuel (aged 19 months) and seven fellow escaped convicts arrived in Koepang Timor after a gruelling 69 day voyage from Sydney. When they arrived, they told the Dutch Governor Mynheer Wanjon, that they were the survivors from a whaler, the Neptune, that had been wrecked in Torres Strait. For a while they were believed but at some point the Dutch realised they were escaped convicts and they were imprisoned, but treated humanely.

On 16 September Edwards arrived at Koepang with survivors of his crew and his captured mutineers in four small boats. He questioned the fugitives who admitted their escape from Port Jackson, but he did not take them in charge until 5 October when he was ready to sail to Batavia on the Rembang. Once on board the prisoners were put in chains and given only enough food to prevent starvation. The captain had offered to provide a cabin for Mary and the children but Edwards refused the offer. When the Rembang arrived in Batavia in November some of the convicts, including William Bryant and Emanuel, were already suffering from fever and were moved ashore to the Dutch East India Company Hospital where Emanuel died on 1 December followed by William three weeks later. In Batavia the crew were divided into four groups under lieutenants Larkan, Corner and Hayward, each travelling back to England via Holland on one of three VOC ships-Horssen, Zwaan and Hoornweg. Captain Edwards, several warrant officers, the escaped convicts and the 10 Bounty prisoners embarked with the fourth group on the Vredenburg for Cape Town.

On this voyage one escaped convict went overboard in Sunda Strait and two died at sea. At the Cape, Mary, her daughter Charlotte and the four surviving convicts were handed over to Commander John Parker of HMS Gorgon. Mary’s daughter Charlotte died at sea during the voyage from Cape Town to England on 5 May 1792.

== Later life ==
Edwards is said to have retired to Cornwall; according to a story linking him to the 'Pandora Inn' along Restronguet Creek near Mylor, which he is alleged to have owned and renamed after retiring from the Navy. However, there is no documentary evidence to support this claim. Rather, together with a story about a figurehead adorning the Inn's stairwell, said to be based on an 18th-century original from the Pandora; this claim can be confidently refuted and relegated to the realm of creative copy-writing to advertise the inn, which according to cadastral records was called 'The Passage House' until 1851, following the death of Alexander Luben, tenant and Restronguet Passage boatman from 1823 until his death in 1848.

Edwards died on 13 April 1815 and was buried in a vault in the chancel of St Remigius church, Water Newton, near Peterborough, Cambridgeshire. The inscription reads:-

Also the Remains of

EDWARD EDWARDS ESQ

Admiral of the White Squadron

in his Majesty's Navy

third son of the said

Richard and Mary Edwards

He died 13th April 1815 Aged 73 Years
