= HMS Fury (1779) =

Sloop of the Royal Navy

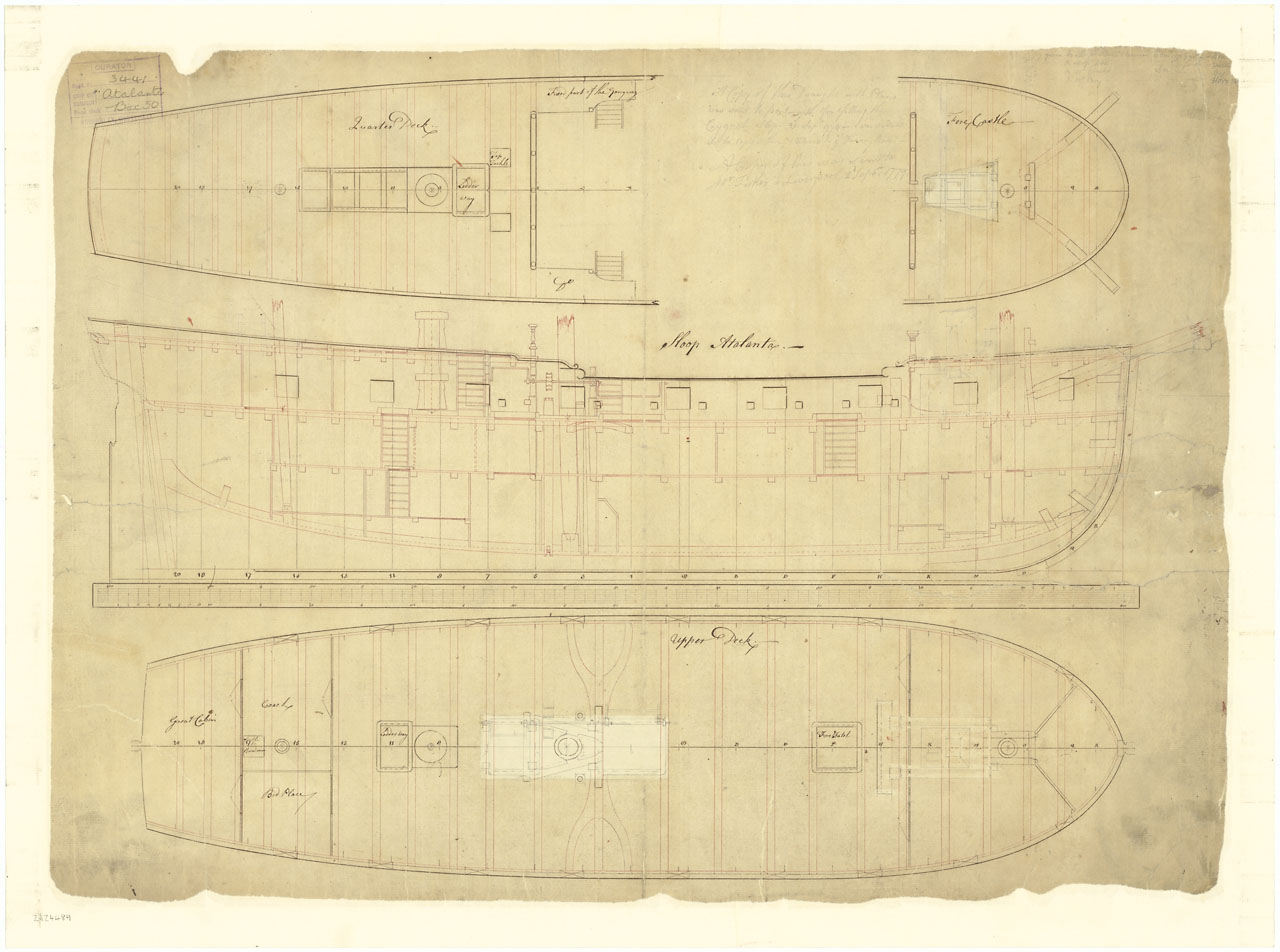
- Plans for sister ship Atalanta

History

Great Britain
- Name: HMS Fury
- Builder: John Sime & Son, North Leith
- Laid down: August 1777
- Launched: 18 March 1779
- Commissioned: June 1779
- Decommissioned: 25 November 1784
- In service: 1779–1784
- Fate: Broken up at Woolwich, April 1787

General characteristics
- Class & type: Swan-class ship sloop
- Tons burthen: 30050/94 (bm)
- Length: 96 ft 7 in (29.4 m) (gundeck); 78 ft 11 1/2 in (24.1 m) (keel)
- Beam: 26 ft 9 in (8.2 m)
- Draught: 6 ft 9 in (2.1 m) (unladen); 10 ft 9 in (3.3 m) (laden)
- Depth of hold: 12 ft 10 in (3.9 m)
- Complement: 125
- Armament: 16 × 6-pounder guns + 16 × 1/2-pounder swivel guns

HMS Fury was a Swan class ship sloop of the Royal Navy and was launched in March 1779. She performed mainly anti-privateering duties during the American War of Independence, both in the English Channel and later the Caribbean Sea. She had a short service life, being paid off after less than 5 years service and broken up 3 years after that, but did have notable commanders.

== Design ==
Between 1766 and 1780 the Admiralty had 25 vessels of her class built to a design by Sir John Williams. She is notable for being the first only Royal Navy warship constructed in both Leith and Scotland during the 18th century. Her builders, John Sime & Son, had never built a warship and had no dock big enough so a new yard was laid out at the Sandport. The site lies opposite the Shore on the west bank of the Water of Leith and was reclaimed for the building of Leith Custom House in 1812.

In February 1779, the Admiralty ordered her to be fitted out for service in the English Channel, to be based at the Nore. A failure to correctly remove the supporting timbers on her launch caused her to become stuck fast and a carpenter lost his life. The Navy's overseer reported in a letter to the Admiralty "she moved 4 feet then burst the ways because the dog shores were not knocked away in time. She is now upright and shored on the ground ways and has been surveyed but not damaged. She will have to remain on the slip until the next spring tide." She was finally floated out on the high tide on 19 March. A dispute between the overseer and her builders saw some finishing work completed under contract to other carpenters, and it was not until May of that year that her rigging was being undertaken by a James Patton.

== Service ==
=== Under Alexander Agnew ===
Commander Alexander Agnew of the Hazard was appointed as her commander in February 1779 while she was still not yet launched. In July 1779 it was reported in the Adam's Weekly Courant newspaper of Chester that the Fury had impressed the entire crew of a whaling ship in Whitby Roads and on 31st of that month the St. James Chronicle reported that she left Leith Roads with the tenders Africa and Swan carrying 300 impressed men, the majority of whom were for the new 74-gun ship HMS Edgar. On 4 October, Fury was back off Leith, having conducted a fruitless search on the east coast for the American John Paul Jones, reported in the Public Advertiser of London.

=== Action of 30 April 1780 ===
On 30 April 1780, Fury was part of a small Royal Navy squadron conducting operations against privateers in the English channel when three French ships were encountered off of Flamborough Head. The squadron was led by Captain Matthew Squire of the 20-gun sloop HMS Ariadne and also included the armed ships Queen (20 guns) under Richard Trotten and Louden (24 guns) under Stephen Rains. When ordered to engage the French, only Queen followed Ariadne and the enemy escaped by "taking to their sweeps" (using long oars called sweeps to out-pace their pursuers). Queen took substantial damage during this encounter.

A court martial was subsequently called into the events aboard the frigate Santa Margarita at the Nore under Vice Admiral Robert Roddam, commander-in-chief at the Nore, on 29 May 1781. Captain Squire was exonerated, the court noting he was "spirited, great, and highly to be recommended" and that he was "acquitted of every aspersion thrown upon his conduct on that day". Commander Agnew and Rains of the Louden on the other hand were found guilty of ignoring their orders and failing to "do their utmost", and were dismissed from the Navy.

=== Later Service ===
After Agnew's dismissal, Commander Thomas Totty was appointed to Fury on 3 June 1781. The London Gazette reported on 28 June 1783, that Totty took a French Privateer, Union Americaine, in July 1781 in company with the fifth-rate HMS Iphigenia and the cutter HMS Monkey and were awarded their share of the prize money. Totty would later rise to the rank of rear admiral and commander of the Leeward Islands Station, where he would die from Yellow Fever in 1802. Totty took Fury to the Barbados and the Leeward Islands Station in March 1782. The London Chronicle would report that on 27 May of that year, Fury took the French brig Mercury, "laden with coffee, cotton and sugar, in 14 days from Port-au-Prince bound for Philadelphia" as a prize and in December returned to Port Royal with a French Polacca as a prize.

From January to May 1783 her captain was Commander Thomas Wells who would later rise to vice admiral and commander-in-chief at the Nore and would be one of the pallbearers at the funeral of Lord Nelson.

Wells was replaced by Commander William Sidney Smith.. Smith would rise to the rank of admiral and fought extensively in the American Revolutionary Wars, the Russo-Swedish War of 1788–1790 and the Napoleonic Campaign in Egypt and Syria.

Her captain from May to August 1783 was Commander William Bentinck and after that was Commander William Smith (no relation to William Sidney Smith). The latter would be the final captain of the Fury.

== Fate ==
On 25 November 1784, the Admiralty ordered that Fury be paid off and on 29 March 1787 ordered her to be broken up. This commenced at Woolwich in April of that year. No other Royal Navy warships would be built in Leith until the Earnest – a 12 gun sloop – and the Woodlark – a 12 gun brig – both of 1805.
