= HMS Narcissus (1781) =

18th century ship

History

Great Britain
- Name: HMS Narcissus
- Ordered: 8 August 1777
- Builder: Plymouth Dockyard
- Laid down: 13 June 1777
- Launched: 9 May 1781
- Completed: By 20 June 1781
- Fate: Wrecked on 3 October 1796

General characteristics
- Class & type: Sphinx-class 20-gun sixth-rate post ship
- Tons burthen: 429 80/94 (bm)
- Length: 108 ft (33 m) (overall); 89 ft 8 in (27.33 m)
- Beam: 30 ft 0 1/2 in (9.157 m)
- Depth of hold: 9 ft 8.5 in (2.959 m)
- Propulsion: Sails
- Sail plan: Full-rigged ship
- Complement: 140 (134 from 1794)
- Armament: GD: 20 × 9-pounder guns; QD (from 1794): 4 × 12-pounder carronades; Fc (1794): 2 × 12-pounder carronades

HMS Narcissus was a Sphinx-class 20-gun sixth-rate post ship of the Royal Navy launched in 1781. Most notably in 1782, while she was under the command of Captain Edward Edwards, a mutiny occurred aboard the vessel that resulted in the hanging of six men, and the flogging of an additional 14. Captain Edwards went on to command HMS Pandora, which was assigned to carry the Bounty mutineers back to England.

== Fate ==
Narcissus was wrecked in 1796.
