= HMS Vestal (1777) =

Royal Navy sixth-rate post ship

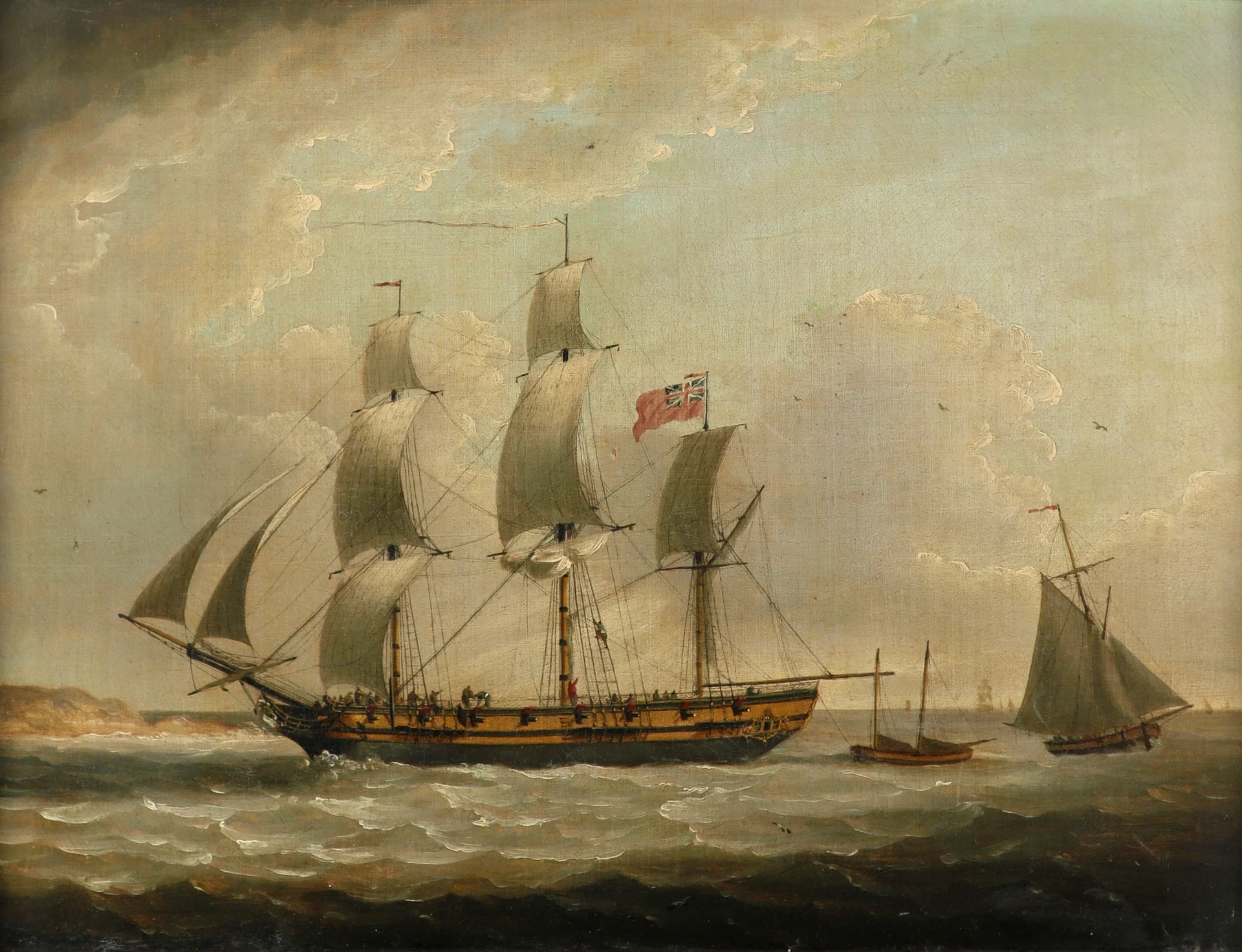
- 1796 painting of Vestal's sister ship HMS Camilla by John Thomas Serres

History

United Kingdom
- Name: Vestal
- Namesake: Vestal Virgin
- Ordered: 1 August 1775
- Builder: Henslow, Plymouth
- Laid down: February 1776
- Launched: 23 May 1777
- Completed: 9 July 1777
- Commissioned: 1777
- Fate: Lost, c.31 October 1777

General characteristics
- Class & type: Sixth-rate Sphinx-class post ship
- Tons burthen: 43160/94 (bm)
- Length: 108 ft (32.9 m) (upper deck); 89 ft 8 in (27.3 m) (keel)
- Beam: 30 ft 1 in (9.2 m)
- Depth of hold: 9 ft 8 in (2.9 m)
- Propulsion: Sails
- Complement: 140
- Armament: UD: 20 × 9-pounder guns

HMS Vestal was a 20-gun sixth-rate Sphinx-class post ship of the Royal Navy. Commissioned by Captain James Shirley, Vestal escorted a convoy to Newfoundland in August 1777 and began service on the Newfoundland station. On about 31 October the same year the ship disappeared off the coast. It was presumed that she had been lost with all hands in a gale.

== Design and construction ==
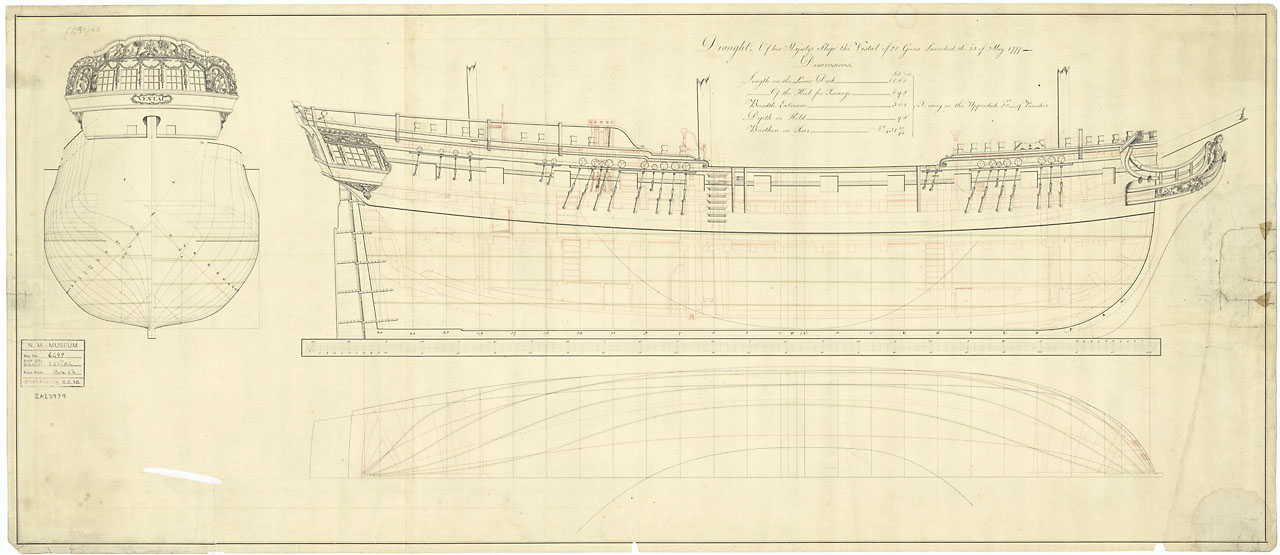
The lines of Vestal from May 1777

Vestal was a 20-gun, 9-pounder Sphinx-class post ship. The class was designed in 1773 by Surveyor of the Navy John Williams. A new class of post ship had not been implemented by the Royal Navy for almost twenty years, and Williams' changes were minor. The Sphinx-class ships were similar to those of the Gibraltar, Seaford, and Squirrel classes of the 1750s, but with finer lines. Ten vessels were ordered to the new design between 1773 and 1776. Following peacetime practice, the first six ships of the class were ordered to Royal Dockyards, but in late 1775 wartime strategy came into place for the American Revolutionary War, and three of the last four Sphinx-class ships were contracted out to civilian dockyards.

Vestal, the sixth ship of the class, was ordered on 1 August 1775 to be built at Plymouth Dockyard by the shipwright John Henslow. Vestal was laid down in February the following year, and launched on 23 May 1777 with the following dimensions: 108 feet (32.9 m) along the upper deck, 89 feet 8 inches (27.3 m) at the keel, with a beam of 30 feet 1 inch (9.2 m) and a depth in the hold of 9 feet 8 inches (2.9 m). The ship measured 43160/94 tons burthen. She was named after the Vestal Virgin priestesses of the goddess Vesta, being the second Royal Navy vessel to hold the name.

The fitting out process for Vestal was completed on 9 July, with the ship having cost a total of £11,991 to construct. With a crew complement of 140, the post ship held twenty 9-pounder long guns on her upper deck. With the carronade subsequently introduced to British warships, in 1794 Sphinx-class post ships received four 12-pounder carronades on their quarterdeck, and another two on their forecastle. Vestal did not survive long enough in service to receive these updates.

== Service ==
Vestal was commissioned under the command of Captain James Shirley about the time of her launching, before the ship had been coppered. The post ship sailed to join the Newfoundland station in about July the same year, departing Plymouth as escort to a large convoy on 18 July. The ship arrived at St Johns with her convoy on 26 August and was then sent out by Vice-Admiral John Montagu on a cruise. While subsequently sailing off the coast of Newfoundland Vestal disappeared. It was presumed that she had foundered with all hands in a gale on about 31 October. The 14-gun ship sloop HMS Pegasus also disappeared off Newfoundland in October, and was similarly thought to have been lost in a storm as she attempted to make shore.
