= HMS Atalanta (1775) =

Sloop of the Royal Navy

Coordinates: 39.578°N 74.300°W

- Drawing of the Atalanta, 1775

History

Great Britain
- Name: HMS Atalanta
- Ordered: 1 December 1773
- Builder: Sheerness Dockyard
- Laid down: 9 April 1774
- Launched: 12 August 1775
- Commissioned: August 1775
- Renamed: HMS Helena in March 1797
- Fate: Sold August 1802

General characteristics
- Class & type: Swan class ship sloop
- Tons burthen: 300 4/94 bm
- Length: 96 ft 7 in (29.4 m) (gundeck); 78 ft 10 in (24.0 m) (keel)
- Beam: 26 ft 9 in (8.2 m)
- Depth of hold: 12 ft 10 in (3.9 m)
- Complement: 125
- Armament: 14 × 6-pounder guns; 2 more added ca. 1780

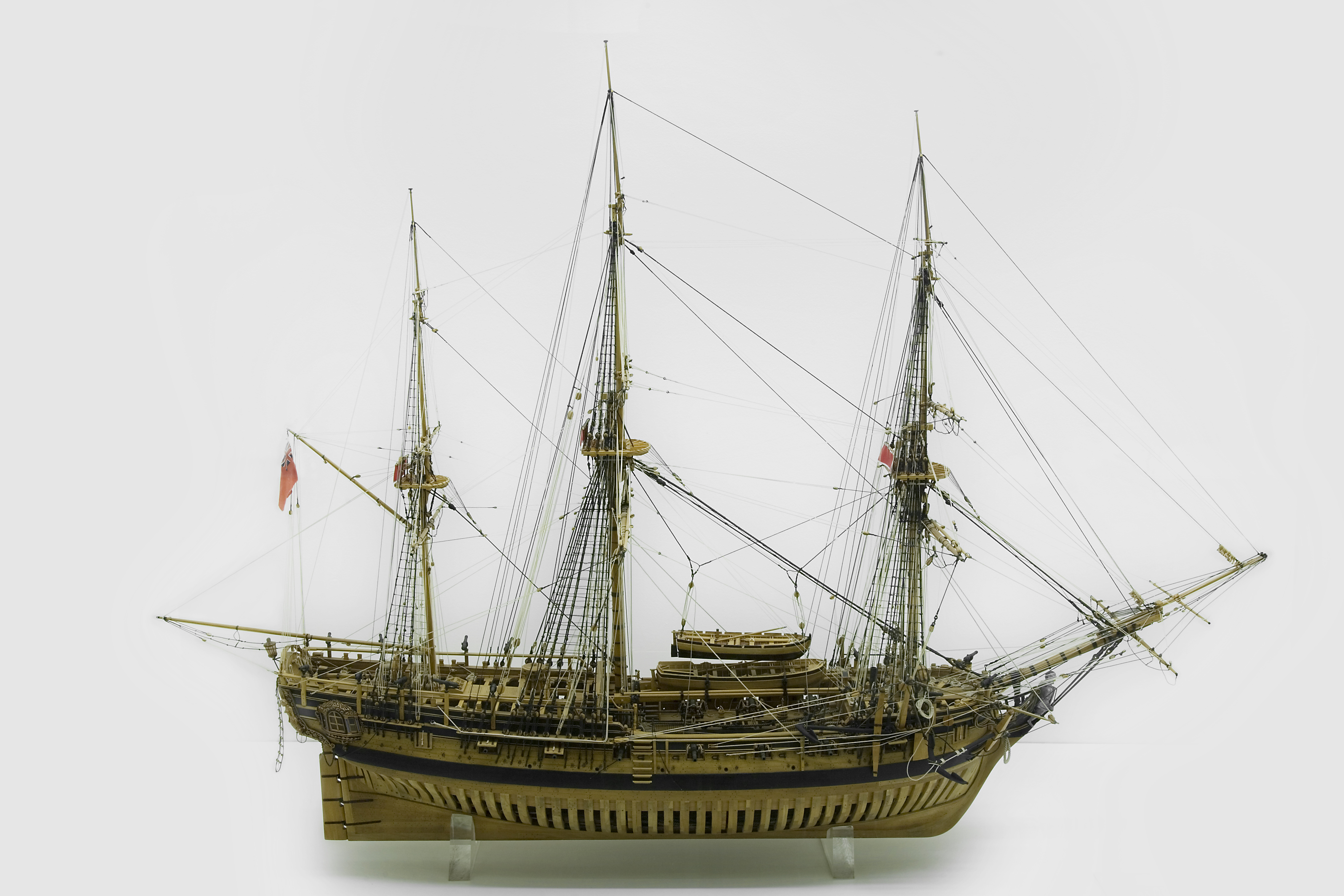
Scale model

HMS Atalanta was a 14-gun Swan class ship-sloop of the Royal Navy launched on 12 August 1775. She served during the American Revolutionary War. On 28 May 1781, Atalanta was captured by the privateer Alliance, in which 24 of her crew were killed or wounded. She was recaptured three days later. In May 1782, under the command of Brett, she destroyed an American privateer (6 guns, 25 men), under then command of Ayret, near Cape d'Or. Privateers from Cumberland (including Samuel Rogers) were on board. The privateers escaped to the woods leaving their provisions, which Captain Brett took to Cumberland.

She also served in the French Revolutionary War, and was then renamed HMS Helena in March 1797 before being sold for disposal in 1802.
