= Hercules (1777 ship) =

British merchant ship 1777–1792

History

Province of Georgia
- Launched: 1777 Georgia
- Fate: Transfer to British registry c.1782

Great Britain
- Name: Hercules
- Namesake: Hercules
- Owner: 1782:Lang; 1783:Crawford; 1786:Miles Barber; 1789:James Baillie, William Taylor, and William Clay; 1791:John Dawson
- Acquired: c.1782
- Captured: Wrecked 1792

General characteristics
- Tons burthen: 300, or 305, or 326, or 367, or 386 (bm)
- Armament: 20 × 6-pounder guns
- Notes: Built of live oak and pine

Hercules was launched at the Province of Georgia in 1777. She appeared in Lloyd's Register in 1782 as a West Indiaman. From 1786 she made three voyages from London as a slave ship in the triangular trade in enslaved people. She was lost in 1792 as she was returning to England after having delivered captives at Jamaica.

== Career ==
Hercules appeared in Lloyd's Register in 1782 with Jn Lang, master and owner, and trade Tortola–London. In 1783 her master was J. Lang, her owner Crawford, and her trade London–Antigua.

In 1786 Lloyd's Register showed Hercules with Ar[thur] Bold, master, Barber & Co., owner, and trade London–Africa. she had undergone repairs in 1783.

1st voyage transporting enslaved people (1786–1788): Captain Arthur Bold sailed from London on 26 April 1786. Hercules started acquiring captives on 13 July 1786, first at Anomabu, then at Cape Coast Castle, and finally at Dixcove. She left Africa on 26 March 1788 arrived at Dominica on 26 May. There she landed 370 captives, having embarked 400, for a death rate of 7%. She left Dominica on 28 June, and arrived back at London on 20 August.

2nd voyage transporting enslaved people(1789–1791): Hercules underwent repairs in 1789. Captain John Knox sailed from London on 23 July 1789 and acquired captives at Iles de Los. She arrived at Dominica 25 February 1791, where she landed 445 captives. She sailed from Dominica on 28 April and arrived at Liverpool on 5 June.

3rd voyage transporting enslaved people (1791–Loss): Hercules underwent repairs in 1791. Captain William Forbes sailed from Liverpool on 17 December 1791. (Note: William Forbes made six voyages as master of a ship transporting enslaved people. Five of these voyages were for the firm of Baker & Dawson, Liverpool's largest firm in the triangular trade.) Hercules stopped at Glasgow, and then acquired captives at Bonny. She arrived at Jamaica on 18 September 1792, and there landed 276 captives. At some point Captain John Brelsford replaced Forbes. She had left London with 38 crew members and had suffered 12 crew deaths on her voyage.

== Loss ==
Lloyd's List reported on 5 February 1793 that Hercules had been lost on the island of Cuba as she was sailing from Jamaica. In 1792, at least six British vessels were lost in the triangular trade in enslaved people. The source for this data does not report and losses as having occurred on the homeward-bound leg of the voyage, but newspaper accounts of losses rarely noted that a vessel lost on her way from the West Indies back to Britain might have been a Guineaman.
