= Swan-class ship-sloop =

1767 class of British warships

Class overview
- Name: Swan class
- Operators: Royal Navy
- Built: 1766–1780
- In service: 1767–1815
- Completed: 25

General characteristics (design details)
- Type: Ship sloop
- Tons burthen: 300 4/94 bm
- Length: 96 ft 7 in (29 m) (gundeck); 78 ft 10 in (24 m) (keel)
- Beam: 26 ft 9 in (8 m)
- Depth of hold: 12 ft 6 in (3.81 m)
- Sail plan: Full-rigged ship
- Complement: 125 (121 from 1794)
- Armament: As built: Fourteen 6-pdr long guns; 1780 onwards: Sixteen 6-pdr long guns

The Swan class were built as a 14-gun class of ship sloops for the Royal Navy, although an extra two guns were added soon after completion.

== Design ==
The class was designed by the Surveyor of the Navy, John Williams, and two vessels to this design (Swan and Kingfisher) were ordered in January 1766. Twenty-three more were ordered to the same design between 1773 and 1779; they formed the 'standard' ship sloop design of the British Navy during the American Revolutionary War, during which eleven of them were lost. Surviving vessels went on to serve during the French Revolutionary War and Napoleonic War.

The design provided for 16 gunports (8 per side, excluding the bridle-ports) but one pair was initially left unoccupied, and the ships were always rated at 14 guns. However an eighth pair of guns was added from 1780 onwards to utilise the vacant ports, without any change in the nominal rating.

The Swan class sloops were unusually attractive for the type of vessel. Not only did they have sleek hull lines but they also carried an unusual amount of decoration for their size. They were built just before the Admiralty issued orders that all vessels (especially lesser rates and unrated vessels) should have minimal decoration and carvings to save on costs, due to the seemingly ever-continuing war with France and other nations.

== Construction ==
Following the initial 1766 order for two ships, a second pair was ordered in 1773 (Cygnet and Atalanta) and a further five in 1775 (Pegasus in April, Fly in August, and Swift, Dispatch and Fortune in October); all these were built in the Royal Dockyards. Another five were contracted in November 1775 to be built by commercial shipbuilders (Hound, Hornet, Vulture, Spy and Cormorant), and a further pair during 1776 (Zebra and Cameleon). Another two were ordered from the Royal Dockyards in January 1777 (Fairy and Nymph) and a final seven from commercial constructors over the following 30 months (Savage, Fury, Delight and Thorn during 1777, Bonetta and Shark during 1778, and Alligator in 1779).

== Ships ==
Name	Ordered	Builder	Launched	Notes
Swan	18 January 1766	Plymouth Dockyard	21 November 1767	Sold 1 September 1814
Kingfisher	18 January 1766	Chatham Dockyard	13 July 1770	Burnt to avoid capture 7 August 1778
Cygnet	15 April 1773	Portsmouth Dockyard	21 January 1776	Sold August 1802
Atalanta	1 December 1773	Sheerness Dockyard	12 August 1775	Sold August 1802
Pegasus	10 April 1775	Chatham Dockyard	27 December 1776	Lost, presumed foundered October 1777
Fly	1 August 1775	Sheerness Dockyard	14 September 1776	Lost, presumed foundered January 1802
Swift	16 October 1775	Portsmouth Dockyard	1 January 1777	Burnt to avoid capture 22 November 1778
Dispatch	16 October 1775	Deptford Dockyard	10 February 1777	Lost, foundered 8 December 1778
Fortune	16 October 1775	Woolwich Dockyard	28 July 1778	Captured by the French 26 April 1780
Hound	30 October 1775	Adams & Barnard, Deptford	8 March 1776	Taken to pieces at Woolwich in November 1784
Hornet	30 October 1775	John Perry and Co, Blackwall	19 March 1776	Laid up in October 1783, and sold in July 1793
Vulture	30 October 1775	John & William Wells, Deptford	18 March 1776	Sold in August 1802
Spy	30 October 1775	Edward Greaves, Limehouse	6 April 1776	Wrecked off Newfoundland on 16 June 1778
Cormorant	30 October 1775	John Barnard, Ipswich	21 May 1776	Taken by the French 24 August 1781
Zebra	24 May 1776	John Barnard, Ipswich	8 April 1777	Wrecked off New Jersey 18 October 1778
Cameleon	21 June 1776	John Randall, Gray & Brent, Rotherhithe	26 March 1777	Wrecked off St Lucia 12 October 1780
Fairy	8 January 1777	Sheerness Dockyard	24 October 1778	Taken to pieces at Plymouth in July 1811
Nymph	8 January 1777	Chatham Dockyard	27 May 1778	Burnt by accident at Tortola, Virgin Islands 28 June 1783
Savage	12 March 1777	John Barnard, Ipswich	28 April 1778	Sold at Woolwich 31 August 1815
Fury	16 July 1777	Sime & Mackenzie, Leith	18 March 1779	Taken to pieces at Woolwich in April 1787
Delight	30 September 1777	Edward Greaves, Limehouse	7 November 1778	Lost, presumed foundered in September 1781
Thorn	30 September 1777	James Betts, Mistleythorn	17 February 1779	Sold 28 August 1816
Bonetta	16 April 1778	Perry & Hankey, Blackwall	29 April 1779	Taken to pieces at Sheerness in October 1797
Shark	20 November 1778	Thomas & Nicholas Walton, Hull	26 November 1779	Foundered at Port Royal 13 January 1818
Alligator	22 June 1779	John Fisher, Liverpool	11 November 1780	Taken by the French 26 June 1782
