= HMS Jane =

Sloop of the Royal Navy

History

North Carolina
- Name: General Nash
- Namesake: Francis Nash
- Owner: John Wright Stanly (or Stanley),
- Launched: 1777
- Captured: 14 February 1781

Great Britain
- Name: HMS Jane
- Acquired: 7 March 1781 by purchase of a prize
- Captured: February 1782

General characteristics
- Tons burthen: 140 (bm)
- Sail plan: Sloop
- Complement: 80 (North Carolina privateer)
- Armament: North Carolina:20 guns; RN: 10, or 16 guns

HMS Jane was the North Carolina ship General Nash. In September–October 1780 General Nash operated as a privateer and captured several British merchant vessels. The British captured General Nash when they took St Eustatius on 14 February 1781. The Royal Navy took General Nash into service as HMS Jane. In 1782 the American privateer Tartar captured Jane.

== North Carolina ship ==
In September 1780 Captain Daniel Deshon and General Nash captured two brigs and brought them into the Cape Fear River. One brig was carrying rum and sugar from St Kitts; the other was from Scotland. Together, the brigs and their cargoes were worth £50,800.

In October General Nash captured three British brigs and brought them into New Bern, North Carolina: Agie (or Aggie), Prince of Wales, and Kitty (or Kattie). Lloyd's List reported on 26 December 1780 that Aggy, Brown, master, from Clyde to Charleston, had been taken and sent into North Carolina. Her first and second mates escaped into Charleston. (Note: Aggie, J. Brown, master, Esdale & Co., owners, of 140 tons (bm), had been launched at Scotland in 1768.) Kitty, Provand, master, sailing from Jamaica to London, was taken into "Newburn".

Captain Deshon captured Kitty on 2 October. He appealed the subsequent decision of the Court of Admiralty at Beaufort, South Carolina, on 28 October. On 5 April 1781 his appeal was (probably) affirmed.

On 14 February the British captured Sint Eustatius. There they captured some 130 vessels. Among them were 14 vessels belonging to Stanly, General Nash's owner, loading at Oranjestad, Netherlands Antilles, and including General Nash.

== Royal Navy service ==
The Royal Navy purchased General Nash on 7 March 1781 and renamed her HMS Jane. Lieutenant John Davall Burr, who had transferred from Pocahontas, commissioned her.

The American 24-gun privateer Tartar captured Jane off the south coast of Haiti on 6 February 1782. Jane had been sailing between St Kitts and Jamaica when she sprang the head of her mainmast. She anchored in the lee of the Île-à-Vache to effect repairs. When Burr sighted a strange vessel he made sail, but his pursuer quickly caught up. Jane fired a broadside but two of her guns came off their carriages, and another came loose from its securing bolts. Water was also coming in through Jane's gun ports. Unable to resist effectively, Burr struck.

The subsequent court martial exonerated Burr for the loss of his ship. The court martial discovered that when Jane had been fitted out locally she had had to take whatever stores and equipment she could get. In particular, apparently her guns and their carriages were ancient and had been condemned.
