= HMS Zebra (1777) =

Sloop of the Royal Navy

Coordinates: 39.578°N 74.300°W

History

Great Britain
- Name: HMS Zebra
- Ordered: 24 May 1776
- Builder: John Barnard, Nova Scotia Yard, Ipswich
- Laid down: July 1776
- Launched: 8 April 1777
- Commissioned: April 1777
- Fate: Wrecked 18 October 1778

General characteristics
- Tons burthen: 306 35/94 bm
- Length: 97 ft 0 in (29.6 m) (gundeck); 79 ft 6 in (24.2 m) (keel)
- Beam: 26 ft 11 in (8.2 m)
- Depth of hold: 12 ft 10.5 in (3.92 m)
- Complement: 125
- Armament: 14 × 6-pounder guns

HMS Zebra was the first ship to bear the name in the British Navy. She was a 14 gun ship sloop of the Swan class, launched on 8 April 1777.

Lieutenant Sir John Orde of HMS Eagle was appointed Captain in 1777 after her Captain, Henry Colins died the night of his arrival at New York, 25 September, with its convoy.

She was abandoned and blown up after going aground on 22 October 1778 at Little Egg Harbor, New Jersey, during the American Revolutionary War after only one year in service.
