= HMS Swift (1777) =

Sloop of the Royal Navy

Coordinates: 39.578°N 74.300°W

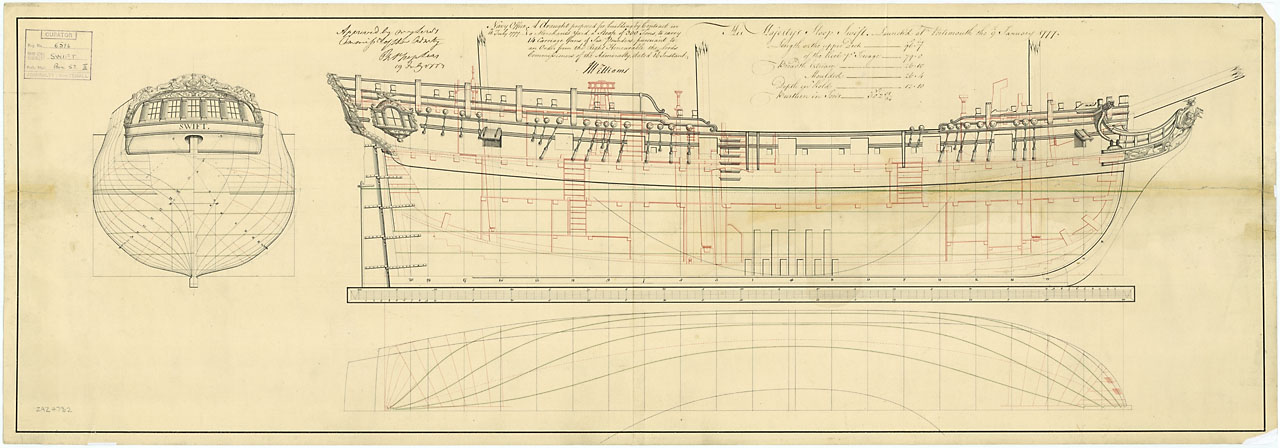
- Swift

History

Great Britain
- Name: HMS Swift
- Ordered: 16 October 1775
- Builder: Portsmouth Dockyard
- Laid down: January 1776
- Launched: 1 January 1777
- Commissioned: January 1777
- Fate: Burnt to avoid capture 22 November 1778

General characteristics
- Class & type: Swan-class ship-sloop
- Tons burthen: 302 53/94 bm
- Length: 96 ft 7 in (29.4 m) (gundeck); 79 ft 0 in (24.1 m) (keel)
- Beam: 26 ft 10 in (8.2 m)
- Depth of hold: 12 ft 10 in (3.91 m)
- Complement: 125
- Armament: 14 × 6-pounder guns

HMS Swift was a 14-gun Swan-class ship-sloop, launched on 1 January 1777. She was commissioned that month under Lieutenant George Keppel and sailed for North America on 27 March. Command later passed to Thomas Lennox Frederick, who captained her in operations on the Delaware River. On 22 November 1778, she was in pursuit of an American privateer, Rattlesnake, off Cape Henry in Chesapeake Bay. During the action Swift grounded on Middle Ground and she was burnt by her crew to prevent her from falling into enemy hands. Rattlesnake was wrecked also.
