= Sphinx-class post ship =

Class overview
- Name: Sphinx-class post ships
- Operators: Royal Navy
- Completed: 10

General characteristics
- Type: Sixth-rate post ship
- Tons burthen: 431 37/94 (as designed)
- Length: 108 ft (33 m) (gundeck); 89 ft 7.375 in (27.31453 m) (keel)
- Beam: 30 ft 1 in (9.17 m)
- Depth of hold: 9 ft 8 in (2.95 m)
- Propulsion: Sail
- Sail plan: Full-rigged ship
- Complement: 140 (reduced to 134 in 1794).
- Armament: UD: 20 × 9-pounder guns; QD (added 1794): 4 × 12-pounder carronades; FC (added 1794): 2 × 12-pounder carronades

The Sphinx-class sailing sixth rates were a series of ten post ships built to a 1773 design by John Williams. Although smaller than true frigates, post ships were often referred to incorrectly as frigates by sea officers, but not by the Admiralty or Navy Board.

The first vessel in the class was launched in 1775, six more in 1776, two in 1777 and the last in 1781. The vessels of the class served in the Royal Navy during the American Revolutionary War. Three of them - Sphinx and Ariel in September 1779, and Unicorn in September 1780 - were captured by the French Navy, but Sphinx was recovered in December 1779 and Unicorn in April 1781. Some survived to see service in the French Revolutionary and Napoleonic Wars.

== Ships in class ==
Name	Ordered	Builder	Begun	Launched	Completed	Fate
Sphinx	15 April 1773	Portsmouth Dockyard	November 1773	25 October 1775	29 December 1775	Broken up at Portsmouth in June 1811.
Camilla	15 April 1773	Chatham Dockyard	May 1774	20 April 1776	9 July 1776	Sold to be broken up in April 1831.
Daphne	15 April 1773	Woolwich Dockyard	August 1774	21 March 1776	25 May 1776	Sold at Sheerness in May 1802.
Galatea	15 April 1773	Deptford Dockyard	October 1774	21 March 1776	26 May 1776	Broken up at Sheerness in April 1783.
Ariadne	10 April 1775	Chatham Dockyard	May 1775	27 December 1776	23 February 1777	Sold at Chatham in August 1814.
Vestal	1 August 1775	Plymouth Dockyard	February 1776	23 May 1777	9 July 1777	Lost with all hands in a gale off Newfoundland in October 1777.
Perseus	30 October 1775	John Randall, Rotherhithe	November 1775	20 March 1776	26 May 1776 at Deptford Dockyard	Broken up at Sheerness in September 1805.
Unicorn	30 October 1775	John Randall, Rotherhithe	November 1775	23 March 1776	25 May 1776 at Woolwich Dockyard	Broken up at Deptford in August 1787.
Ariel	3 July 1776	John Perry, Blackwall	July 1776	7 July 1777	12 August 1777 at Woolwich Dockyard	Taken by the French Navy on 10 September 1779.
Narcissus	8 January 1777	Plymouth Dockyard	13 June 1777	9 May 1781	20 June 1781	Wrecked off the Bahamas in October 1796.
