= HMS Pocahontas =

Sloop of the Royal Navy

History

Virginia
- Name: Pocahontas
- Namesake: Pocahontas
- Builder: Rappahannock
- Launched: 1777
- Captured: 1780

Great Britain
- Acquired: 1780 by purchase of a prize
- Renamed: HMS Pacahunta (May 1781)
- Fate: Sold 1782

General characteristics
- Tons burthen: 242 (283 by calculation) (bm)
- Length: Overall:98 ft 0 in (29.9 m); Keel:82 ft 10 1/2 in (25.3 m)
- Beam: 25 ft 4 in (7.7 m)
- Depth of hold: 10 ft 10 in (3.3 m)
- Complement: 120
- Armament: 14 × 6-pounder guns + 12 × ½-pounder swivel guns

HMS Pochahontas was the Virginia letter of marque Pocahontas, launched in 1777. The British Royal Navy captured her in 1780. She participated in the battle of Fort Royal, Martinique, in April 1781. In May she was renamed Pachahunta (or Packahunter). The Navy sold her at Jamaica in 1782.

== Capture ==
Pocahontas was built on the Rappahanock in 1777 and fitted out at Fredericksburg.

Captain Eleazer Callender of the Virginia Navy ship Dragon resigned his commission on 20 July 1779 to take command of Pocahontas. He brought with him John Hamilton, his First lieutenant on Dragon. At the time, "Virginia's naval vessels were poorly armed, incompetently manned and ill-fitted for service."

The 74-gun ship HMS Alcide captured Pocahontas on 12 September 1780.

== Royal Navy service ==
The Royal Navy purchased Pocahontas on 2 October 1780. On 29–30 April 1781 Pochahontas, Commander Edward Tyrell Smith, was at the inconclusive battle of Fort Royal. On 1 May, as Rear Admiral Samuel Hood and his squadron sailed from Martinique, the French followed. HMS Torbay and Pocahontas were lagging and within range of the enemy guns. The French directed their fire at Torbay which sustained damage to her masts and rigging. Hood sent HMS Amazon to tow Pocahontas out of range. The French then broke off their pursuit. Hood transferred Smith to command HMS Centaur, Captain Nott having been killed in the battle, and placed John Davall Burr in command of Pocahontas.

Burr commissioned her and on 28 May she was renamed Pacahunta. (Note: A key source gives the date of renaming as 28 May 1780, which must be typo as that would have the renaming preceding the capture.) Admiral Rodney did not confirm Burr's appointment and Burr transferred to the sloop HMS Jane.

Commander Alexander Inglis Cochrane replaced Burr.

In December Commander Isaac Coffin, of HMS Avenger exchanged ships with Cochrane and took command of Pacahunter in New York. He then sailed her to Barbados, where her arrived in January 1782. There he joined Rear Admiral Hood in HMS Barfleur. Coffin participated in the battle of St Kitts (25-26 January) and then returned to Pochahontas.

Some accounts placed Coffin in Barfleur at the battle of the Saintes, but it is not possible to confirm that.

Coffin and the crew of Pacahunta helped in fighting a great fire in St. John's. His service earned him the thanks of the House of Assembly.

After HMS Santa Mónica wrecked on Tortola on 1 April, Pacahunta helped convey part of her crew to Jamaica. At Jamaica Coffin was appointed to command of the 74-gun HMS Shrewsbury. He was confirmed in the rank of captain on 13 June.

== Fate ==
Commander David Gould succeeded Coffin in command of Pachahunta. The Navy sold her at Jamaica on 26 July 1782.
