= HMS Pegasus (1776) =

14-gun ship sloop of UK navy

Coordinates: 39.578°N 74.300°W

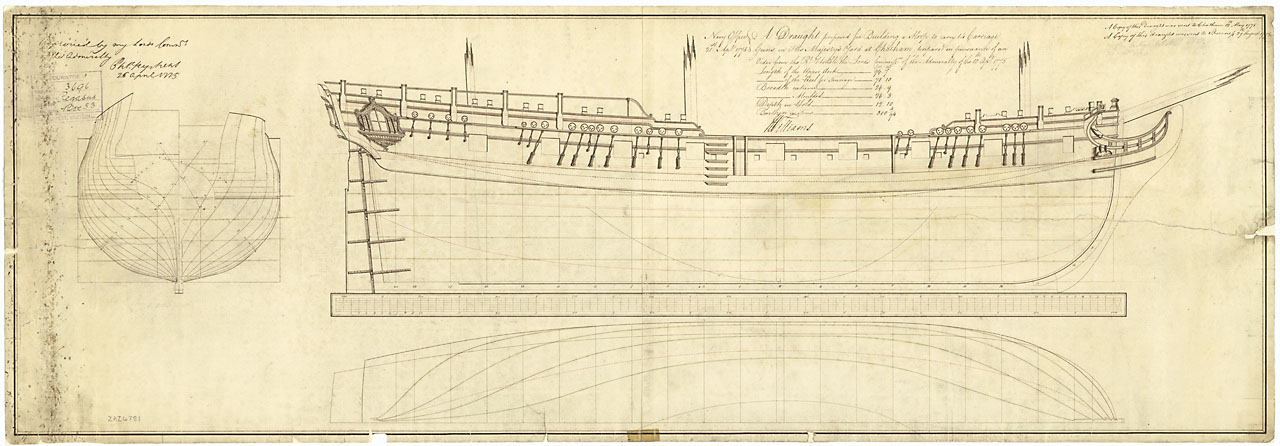
- A drawing of Pegasus, 1775

History

Great Britain
- Name: HMS Pegasus
- Ordered: 10 April 1775
- Builder: Chatham Dockyard
- Laid down: May 1775
- Launched: 27 December 1776
- Commissioned: December 1776
- Fate: Lost, presumed foundered in a storm in October 1777

General characteristics
- Class & type: Swan-class ship-sloop
- Tons burthen: 301 87/94 bm
- Length: 96 ft 7 in (29.4 m) (gundeck); 78 ft 10 in (24.0 m) (keel)
- Beam: 26 ft 10 in (8.2 m)
- Depth of hold: 12 ft 10 in (3.91 m)
- Complement: 125
- Armament: 14 × 6-pounder guns

HMS Pegasus was a 14-gun ship sloop of the Swan class, launched on 27 December 1776. She was commissioned the same month under Commander John Hamilton Gore and - after completing on 3 March 1777 - sailed for Newfoundland on 3 April. She was lost with all hands in a storm off Newfoundland in October.
