= HMS Fox =

Sixteen ships and two shore establishments of the Royal Navy have been named HMS Fox, after the fox.

== Ships ==
- HMS Fox (1650) was a 22-gun ship captured from the French in 1650 and expended as a fireship in 1656.
- HMS Fox (1658) was a 14-gun ship captured in 1658 and expended as a fireship in 1666.
- HMS Fox (1690) was an 8-gun fireship launched in 1690 and expended in 1692 at La Hougue.
- HMS Fox (1699) was a 6-gun sloop launched in 1699 and wrecked later that year.
- HMS Fox was a 24-gun sixth rate captured in 1705 and wrecked the following year.
- HMS Fox was a 24-gun sixth rate launched in 1702 as HMS Nightingale. She was captured by the French in 1707, was recaptured later that year and renamed HMS Fox, rebuilt in 1727 and broken up in 1737.
- HMS Fox (1740) was a 20-gun sixth rate launched in 1740 and foundered in 1745.
- HMS Fox (1746) was a 24-gun sixth rate launched in 1746 and foundered in a hurricane in 1751.
- HMS Fox (1766) was an 8-gun ketch launched in 1766, and still in the records in 1772.
- HMS Fox (1773) was a 28-gun sixth rate launched in 1773, captured by the Americans in 1777, recaptured a month later, then captured by the French in 1778. She ran aground in March 1779 on Pointe St Jacques on Rhuys Peninsula and could not be refloated.
- HMS Fox (1780) was a 32-gun fifth rate launched in 1780 and broken up in 1816.
- HM hired armed cutter Fox, of twelve 9-pounder guns, was hired on 27 March 1793 and sunk in action at the Battle of Santa Cruz de Tenerife (1797).
- HMS Fox (1799) was a 14-gun schooner purchased in 1799 and wrecked later that year off Dog Island, Apalachee Bay, Florida. There were no lives lost despite the fact that the crew had to wait for 33 days with little food and water before they were rescued.
- HMS Fox (1829) was a 46-gun fifth rate launched in 1829, converted to a screw frigate in 1856, and broken up in 1882.
- HMS Fox (1893) was an Astraea-class second class cruiser launched in 1893 and sold in 1920.
- HMS Fox (A320) was a survey vessel launched in 1967 and sold in 1989.

== Shore establishments ==
- HMS Fox (shore establishment) was the Navy's base at Lerwick, Shetland between 1939 and 1945.
- HMS Fox II was the Coastal Forces Base at Lerwick between 1942 and 1944.

== Battle honours ==
Ships named Fox have earned the following battle honours: (Note: In the Royal Navy, and other Commonwealth navies that follow the traditions of the RN, battle honours awarded to a ship are inherited by subsequent ships to bear the same name, and are displayed on the ship's honours board.)

- Gabbard, 1653
- Orfordness, 1666
- Barfleur, 1692
- Genoa, 1795
- St Vincent, 1797
- Egypt, 1801
- Burma, 1852–3

== See also ==
- HMS Foxglove
- HMS Foxhound
- HMS Flying Fox
- Fox (ship), Arctic exploration vessel.
