= List of shipwrecks in 1799 =

The list of shipwrecks in 1799 includes ships sunk, foundered, grounded, wrecked or otherwise lost during 1799.

table of contents
1799
Jan	Feb	Mar	Apr
May	Jun	Jul	Aug
Sep	Oct	Nov	Dec
Unknown date

== January ==
=== 1 January ===
List of shipwrecks: 1 January 1799
Ship	State	Description
Barbadoes Friends	Great Britain	War of the Second Coalition: The ship was captured and destroyed in the Atlantic Ocean (26°30′N 25°00′W) by four Spanish frigates. She was on a voyage from London to Trinidad.
Darlington	Great Britain	War of the Second Coalition: The ship was captured and destroyed in the Atlantic Ocean (26°30′N 25°00′W) by four Spanish frigates. She was on a voyage from London to Dominica.
Friends	Great Britain	War of the Second Coalition: The ship was captured and destroyed in the Atlantic Ocean (26°30′N 25°00′W) by four Spanish frigates. She was on a voyage from London to Martinique.
Swan	Great Britain	War of the Second Coalition: The ship was captured and destroyed in the Atlantic Ocean (26°30′N 25°00′W) by four Spanish Frigates. She was on a voyage from London to Jamaica.

=== 2 January ===
List of shipwrecks: 2 January 1799
Ship	State	Description
Hired armed lugger Duke of York	(Kingdom of Great Britain) Royal Navy	The hired armed lugger foundered in the North Sea.

=== 3 January ===
List of shipwrecks: 3 January 1799
Ship	State	Description
Devon	Great Britain	The ship was abandoned in the Atlantic Ocean. She was on a voyage from Newfoundland, British North America to an English port.

=== 4 January ===
List of shipwrecks: 4 January 1799
Ship	State	Description
Ontario	Great Britain	The ship was lost in the Strait of Billiton. She was on a voyage from China to New York, United States.

=== 7 January ===
List of shipwrecks: 7 January 1799
Ship	State	Description
HMS Apollo	(Kingdom of Great Britain) Royal Navy	The Artois-class frigate was wrecked on the Haak Sands, in the North Sea off the Dutch coast. Her crew were rescued by a Prussian hoy.

=== 8 January ===
List of shipwrecks: 8 January 1799
Ship	State	Description
Lucy	United States	The ship foundered in the Atlantic Ocean. She was on a voyage from Baltimore, Maryland to Figueira da Foz, Portugal.

=== 10 January ===
List of shipwrecks: 10 January 1799
Ship	State	Description
"Henry"	United States	The sloop was captured by packet/privateer "St. Rosalia" (Spain). She was run aground and wrecked 7 Leagues leeward of Cape Maize. Whole crew, less Captain, Mate and apprentice, plus all, except 27, slaves perished.

=== 11 January ===
List of shipwrecks: 11 January 1799
Ship	State	Description
Ganges	British East India Company	The brig caught fire in Saugar Roads in the Ganges Delta and exploded with the loss of eight lives after the fllames spread to her gunpowder magazine. The vessel Laurel (Flag unknown) rescued her 99 survivors. Some sources place this incident on 11 January 1797.

=== 12 January ===
List of shipwrecks: 12 January 1799
Ship	State	Description
Patrick	Ireland	War of the Second Coalition: The ship was captured by the French whilst on a voyage from Dublin to Porto, Portugal. She was set afire and sunk.

=== 15 January ===
List of shipwrecks: 15 January 1799
Ship	State	Description
Pigou	Great Britain	War of the Second Coalition: The ship was captured by the privateer Vengeance (France). She was subsequently lost on The Olives, off the mouth of the Gironde.

=== 19 January ===
List of shipwrecks: 19 January 1799
Ship	State	Description
HMS Grampus	(Kingdom of Great Britain) Royal Navy	The 54-gun ship was lost in the River Thames at Woolwich, Kent, England. Her crew were saved.

=== 20 January ===
List of shipwrecks: 20 January 1799
Ship	State	Description
Princess Amelia	Great Britain	War of the Second Coalition: The ship was captured by Spartiate (France). She was set afire and sunk. Princess Amelia was on a voyage from Halifax, Nova Scotia, British America to Madeira.

=== 25 January ===
List of shipwrecks: 25 January 1799
Ship	State	Description
Jane & Betty	Great Britain	The ship was run down and sunk off Cromer, Norfolk. Her crew were rescued. She was on a voyage from King's Lynn, Norfolk to Rye, Sussex.

=== 30 January ===
List of shipwrecks: 30 January 1799
Ship	State	Description
Unnamed	France	The privateer capsized and sank with all hand in a squall while pursuing "Essequebo Packet" (United States) windward of Martinique.

=== 31 January ===
List of shipwrecks: 31 January 1799
Ship	State	Description
HMS Eagle	(Kingdom of Great Britain) Royal Navy	The gunboat was driven ashore in Studland Bay.
Unnamed	Flag unknown	The cutter was driven ashore in Studland Bay.

=== Unknown date ===
List of shipwrecks: Unknown date in January 1799
Ship	State	Description
Acasto	Great Britain	The ship was run down and sunk with the loss of all on board. She was on a voyage from Jamaica to Liverpool, Lancashire.
Active	Great Britain	The ship was lost near Lisbon, Portugal. She was on a voyage from London to Venice.
America	United States	The ship was driven ashore on the coast of Lincolnshire, Great Britain. Her crew were rescued. She was on a voyage from Philadelphia, Pennsylvania, to Hamburg.
Barbara and Ann	Great Britain	The ship was driven ashore at Lowestoft, Suffolk.
Comet Isaacks	United States	The ship was driven ashore near Emden, Hanover. She was on a voyage from Baltimore, Maryland to Emden.
Diana	Hanover	The ship was driven ashore near Emden. She was on a voyage from Emden to Batavia, Dutch East Indies.
Fanny	Great Britain	The ship was wrecked on Öland, Sweden. her crew were rescued. She was on a voyage from Memel, Prussia to London. Her crew were rescued.
Fortuna	Great Britain	The ship was destroyed by fire at Pwllheli, Caernarfonshire. She was on a voyage from Lisbon, Portugal to Liverpool.
Fourage	Hanover	The ship was driven ashore near Emden. She was on a voyage from Emden to Guernsey, Channel Islands.
Gemini	Great Britain	The ship ran aground on the Arklow Bank, in the Irish Sea off County Wicklow. She was on a voyage from Porto, Portugal to Dublin.
Hane	Hamburg	The ship was wrecked in the Orkney Islands, Great Britain whilst on a voyage from Hamburg to New York.
John	Great Britain	The ship was driven ashore at Hull, Yorkshire. She was on a voyage from Hamburg to Guernsey, Channel Islands.
Juffrow Anna Bosma	Hanover	The ship was wrecked near Dunkirk, Nord, France. She was on a voyage from Emden to London.
Lavinia	Ireland	The ship was driven ashore near Wexford. She was on a voyage from Porto to Belfast, County Antrim.
Louisa Charlotta	Sweden	The ship was wrecked near Gothenburg. She was on a voyage from Stockholm to Great Yarmouth, Norfolk, Great Britain.
Louisa Dorothea	Prussia	The ship was driven ashore at Memel. She was on a voyage from Königsburg to Memel and Ireland.
Neutrality	Great Britain	The ship was driven ashore near Emden. She was on a voyage from London to Emden.
O Verdadeiro Brittanico	Portugal	The ship was driven ashore in Gibraltar Bay.
Roper	Great Britain	The ship was driven ashore near Stralsund, Sweden.
Samuel	Great Britain	The ship was lost on Eigg. She was on a voyage from Saint Petersburg, Russia to Liverpool.
Shadwell	Great Britain	The ship was driven ashore at Tralee, County Kerry, Ireland. She was on a voyage from Naples, Kingdom of Sicily to Hamburg.
Vigilant	Great Britain	The ship was wrecked in Dungarvan Bay. Her crew were rescued. She was on a voyage from Newfoundland, British North America to Bristol, Gloucestershire.
Vrow Sara	Hanover	The ship was driven ashore at Emden. She was on a voyage from London to Emden.
Welvaaren van Rheedery	Danzig	The ship was driven ashore on Bornholm, Denmark. She was on a voyage from Danzig to Liverpool.
Unnamed	Flag unknown	The ship was wrecked at Figueira da Foz, Portugal with the loss of the majority of her crew.
Unnamed	Great Britain	The ship was run down and sunk with the loss of all on board. She was on a voyage from Jamaica to London.

== February ==
=== 1 February ===
List of shipwrecks: 1 February 1799
Ship	State	Description
Fanny	Great Britain	The ship was wrecked at Dublin, Ireland. She was on a voyage from Liverpool, Lancashire to Dublin.
General Prescott	Great Britain	The ship was wrecked at Dublin. She was on a voyage from the Clyde to the West Indies.
Hero	Great Britain	Captain Fleek's ship was wrecked at Dublin. She was on a voyage from the Clyde to the West Indies.
Hero	Great Britain	Captain Wood's ship was wrecked at Dublin. She was on a voyage from the Clyde to the West Indies.
Lowther	Great Britain	The ship was wrecked at Dublin. She was on a voyage from Liverpool to Dublin.
Prince of Wales	Great Britain	The Packet was wrecked in the Elbe River by a Gale with a snowstorm and driven ashore by ice flows.
HMS Proserpine	(Kingdom of Great Britain) Royal Navy	HMS Proserpine. The Enterprise-class frigate was wrecked in ice on Neuwerk, or 6 nautical miles (11 km) north west of Scharhörn, with the loss of eighteen of the 187 people originally on board. She drifted off again in a storm on the night of the 10th with a party of six that had re-boarded her, drifting onto a rock 1 1/2 nautical miles (2.8 km) off Baltrum on 12 February.

=== 2 February ===
List of shipwrecks: 2 February 1799
Ship	State	Description
Three Brothers	Great Britain	The ship was wrecked on the Haisborough Sands, in the North Sea off the coast of Norfolk with the loss of all but two of her crew.
Three unnamed vessels	Flags unknown	The ships were wrecked on the North Bull, off the coast of County Dublin, Ireland with the loss of all hands.

=== 3 February ===
List of shipwrecks: 3 February 1799
Ship	State	Description
HMS Nautilus	(Kingdom of Great Britain) Royal Navy	The sloop-of-war was driven ashore and wrecked near Scarborough, Yorkshire. Her crew were rescued.
10 or 12 unnamed vessels	Flags unknown	The ships were driven ashore near Scarborough.

=== 7 February ===
List of shipwrecks: 7 February 1799
Ship	State	Description
Unnamed	Great Britain	The ship was wrecked at Dublin, Ireland with the loss of all hands.

=== 8 February ===
List of shipwrecks: 8 February 1799
Ship	State	Description
Martinus	Sweden	The brig struck The Manacles and foundered. Her crew were rescued. She was on a voyage from Gothenburg to Cork, Ireland.
Unnamed	Sweden	The ship ran aground on the Haisborough Sands, in the North Sea off the coast of Norfolk, Great Britain and sank with the loss of all but one of her crew.

=== 10 February ===
List of shipwrecks: 10 February 1799
Ship	State	Description
HMS Weazel	(Kingdom of Great Britain) Royal Navy	The brig-sloop was wrecked off Braunton, Devon with the loss of all but one of her 106 crew.

=== 11 February ===
List of shipwrecks: 11 February 1799
Ship	State	Description
Beckford	Great Britain	The ship was driven ashore in St Ives Bay. She was on a voyage from Faro, Portugal to London.
Mary	Great Britain	The ship was lost near Truro, Cornwall. She was on a voyage from Waterford, Ireland to London.

=== 15 February ===
List of shipwrecks: 15 February 1799
Ship	State	Description
"Rencountre"	France	The privateer was burned by her crew in the Watenamo River, off Cumberland Bay, to prevent capture.

=== 18 February ===
List of shipwrecks: 23 February 1799
Ship	State	Description
Espiegle	Great Britain	The brig was wrecked north of Great Yarmouth, Norfolk. Some of her crew were rescued.

=== 23 February ===
List of shipwrecks: 23 February 1799
Ship	State	Description
Earl Fitzwilliam	British East India Company	The East Indiaman was destroyed by fire at Bengal, India with some loss of life.

=== Unknown date ===
List of shipwrecks: Unknown date in February 1799
Ship	State	Description
Adventure	United States	The ship struck an anchor and sank at Dublin, Ireland.
Alligator	United States	The ship was driven ashore at Kinsale, County Cork, Ireland. She was on a voyage from Portsmouth, New Hampshire to Cork.
Amity	Great Britain	The ship was lost on the coast of Cornwall. She was on a voyage from Liverpool, Lancashire to London.
Apollo	Hamburg	War of the Second Coalition The ship was captured and was subsequently lost. She was on a voyage from Lisbon, Portugal to Hamburg.
Arabella	Great Britain	The ship was driven ashore at Scarborough, Yorkshire.
Beaver	Great Britain	The ship was wrecked near Cork, Ireland before 22 February. Her crew were rescued. She was on a voyage from Limerick, Ireland to Hull, Yorkshire.
Bee	Great Britain	The ship was driven ashore and wrecked at Poole, Dorset. She was on a voyage from London to the West Indies.
Betsey	Great Britain	The ship was lost with all hands. She was on a voyage from Rhuddlan, Denbighshire to Liverpool.
Brooks	Great Britain	The ship was driven ashore and wrecked on the coast of Cheshire. She was on a voyage from Liverpool to Africa.
Captain Cook	Great Britain	The ship was lost near Copenhagen, Denmark. She was on a voyage from London to a Baltic port.
Catherine	Great Britain	The ship was driven ashore near Bridlington, Yorkshire.
Dennis	Great Britain	The ship was driven ashore in Dungarvan Bay.
Diana	Great Britain	The ship was driven ashore at Margate, Kent. She was on a voyage from Cork to London.
Dove	Great Britain	The ship was driven ashore at Great Yarmouth, Norfolk and was wrecked. She was on a voyage from Wisbech, Cambridgeshire to Whitstable, Kent.
Eaglesbrush	Great Britain	The ship was driven ashore near Padstow, Cornwall. She was on a voyage from London to Padstow.
Fame	Great Britain	The ship was driven ashore and wrecked near Weymouth, Dorset. She was on a voyage from Newcastle upon Tyne, Northumberland to Weymouth.
Fortune	Great Britain	The ship was wrecked near Scarborough with the loss of all hands.
Glory	Great Britain	The ship was lost near Scarborough. She was on a voyage from Königsberg, Prussia to London.
Goodintent	Great Britain	The ship was lost near Portpatrick, Wigtownshire. She was on a voyage from London to Newry, County Antrim, Ireland.
Grand Duke	Great Britain	The ship was driven ashore at Margate. She was on a voyage from Jamaica to London. Grand Duke was later refloated.
Hope	Great Britain	The ship was driven ashore near St Bees, Cumberland. She was on a voyage from Liverpool to the Bahamas and West Indies.
Ingeberg	Great Britain	The ship was abandoned by her crew. She was on a voyage from London to Dover, Kent. Ingeberg was later taken in to Margate.
John	Great Britain	The ship was wrecked on the Casquets, Channel Islands with the loss of all hands.
John	Great Britain	The ship was driven ashore and wrecked at Portland, Dorset. She was on a voyage from the Baltic to Bridport, Dorset.
Kitty	Great Britain	The ship was driven ashore at Great Yarmouth and was wrecked. She was on a voyage from Leith, Lothian to Livorno.
Kitty	Great Britain	The ship was wrecked with the loss of 24 of her crew. She was on a voyage from Liverpool to Africa.
Lark	Great Britain	The ship was driven ashore near Bridlington.
Lark	Great Britain	The ship was wrecked in the Isles of Scilly. She was on a voyage from Waterford, Ireland to Portsmouth, Hampshire.
Liebe & Hoffnung	Stettin	The ship was lost off Rye, Sussex, Great Britain. She was on a voyage from Stettin to Dover and Liverpool.
Little Falmouth	Great Britain	The ship was driven ashore in Wexford Bay. She was on a voyage from Falmouth, Cornwall to Liverpool.
London Packet	Great Britain	The ship foundered in Tramore Bay with the loss of all but one of her crew. She was on a voyage from London to Newry.
Mary	Great Britain	The ship was lost near Blakeney, Norfolk. She was on a voyage from Guernsey, Channel Islands to King's Lynn, Norfolk.
Mary Ann	Great Britain	The ship was lost on the coast of Ireland. She was on a voyage from Liverpool to Drogheda, County Louth, Ireland.
Mayflower	Great Britain	The ship was lost near Flamborough Head, Yorkshire. She was on a voyage from Riga, Russia to London.
HMS Musquito	(Kingdom of Great Britain) Royal Navy	The 6-gun schooner was captured off Cuba by two Spanish frigates.
HMS Nautilus	(Kingdom of Great Britain) Royal Navy	The Sloop-of-War was driven ashore and wrecked near Scarborough.
Recovery	Great Britain	The ship was driven ashore at Weymouth, Dorset. She was on a voyage from Weymouth to King's Lynn.
Resolution	Ireland	The ship was lost in Dublin Bay.
Rose in June	Ireland	The ship was wrecked off Youghal, County Cork with the loss of all but her captain. This was on 7 or 14 February. She was on a voyage from Newry, County Antrim to London.
Sally	Great Britain	The ship was driven ashore and wrecked at Milford, Pembrokeshire. She was on a voyage from Liverpool to Bristol, Gloucestershire.
Thetis	Great Britain	The ship was driven ashore and wrecked near Sandown Castle, Kent. She was on a voyage from Hull to Lisbon.
Thetis	Great Britain	The ship foundered in the Atlantic Ocean off Porto, Portugal. Her crew were rescued. She was on a voyage from Newfoundland, British North America to Lisbon and Porto.
Three Brothers	Great Britain	The ship foundered in Tramore Bay whilst on a voyage from Cork, Ireland to Liverpool, Lancashire.
Three Sisters	Great Britain	The ship was lost in Orchard's Bay, Isle of Wight with the loss of three of her crew. She was on a voyage from London to Barbados.
Union	Great Britain	The ship was lost on the coast of Ireland. She was on a voyage from Liverpool to Londonderry, Ireland.
Uxbridge	Great Britain	The ship was lost in Dublin Bay.
Venus	Great Britain	The ship was lost at Porto. She was on a voyage from Newfoundland to Porto.
Wakefield	Great Britain	The ship ran aground in The Swin. She was on a voyage from Danzig to London.
Wohlfarth	Hamburg	The ship was lost near Padstow She was on a voyage from Málaga, Spain to Hamburg.

== March ==
=== 7 March ===
List of shipwrecks: 7 March 1799
Ship	State	Description
Peace and Plenty	Ireland	The sloop foundered off the Saltee Islands, County Donegal. Her crew were rescued. She was on a voyage from Dublin to São Miguel Island, Azores.

=== 15 March ===
List of shipwrecks: 15 March 1799
Ship	State	Description
Harriot	Great Britain	War of the Second Coalition: The ship was captured by the privateer L'Eole (France) and was burnt. She was on a voyage from London to São Miguel Island, Azores.

=== 17 March ===
List of shipwrecks: 17 March 1799
Ship	State	Description
Vigilancia	Portugal	The ship foundered. She was on a voyage from Lisbon to London, Great Britain.

=== 27 March ===
List of shipwrecks: 27 March 1799
Ship	State	Description
Hope	Great Britain	The ship foundered whilst on a voyage from Plymouth, Devon to London.

=== 29 March ===
List of shipwrecks: 29 March 1799
Ship	State	Description
Fame	Great Britain	The ship departed from Plymouth, Devon to Liverpool, Lancashire. No further trace, presumed foundered with the loss of all hands.

=== 30 March ===
List of shipwrecks: 30 March 1799
Ship	State	Description
Several unnamed vessels	Flags unknown	The ships were driven ashore in Studland Bay.

=== 31 March ===
List of shipwrecks: 31 March 1799
Ship	State	Description
Betsey	Great Britain	The sloop was run down and sunk by HMS Mars ( (Kingdom of Great Britain) Royal Navy) in Cawsand Bay. Her six crew were rescued.

=== Unknown date ===
List of shipwrecks: Unknown date in March 1799
Ship	State	Description
Adeona	Great Britain	The ship was driven ashore near Ystad, Sweden. She was on a voyage from Memel, Prussia to London.
Amelia	Hamburg	The ship was driven ashore by ice at Cuxhaven and was abandoned by her crew. She was on a voyage from London to Hamburg.
Amelia	Bremen	The ship was sunk by ice off the mouth of the Weser. She was on a voyage from Lisbon, Portugal to Bremen.
Amelia and Eleanor	Great Britain	The ship was driven ashore at Waterford, Ireland and was wrecked. Her crew were rescued. She was on a voyage from Barbados to Liverpool, Lancashire.
Betsey & Peggy	Great Britain	War of the Second Coalition: The ship was captured and burnt.
Elizabeth and Margaret	United Kingdom	The ship was driven ashore near Portland, Dorset. She was on a voyage from Dublin, Ireland, to Guernsey, Channel Islands. Elizabeth and Margaret was later refloated and taken in to Weymouth, Dorset.
Fortune	Great Britain	The ship was driven ashore near Margate, Kent. She was on a voyage from Sandwich, Kent to London.
Happy Return	Great Britain	The ship was driven ashore near Whitby, Yorkshire. She was on a voyage from Berwick upon Tweed to London.
Hercules	Great Britain	The ship foundered off the coast of Ireland. She was on a voyage from Wiscasset, Maine, United States to Liverpool.
Jane	Great Britain	The sloop was lost on Filey Brigg, Yorkshire with the loss of all hands.
La Vutoire	Great Britain	War of the Second Coalition. The brig was captured by HMS Triton ( (Kingdom of Great Britain) Royal Navy). She was subsequently driven ashore at Plymouth, Devon, Great Britain.
Lydia	United States	Quasi-War: The ship was captured by the French. She was subsequently wrecked on The Olives rocks.
Maadsgoodhope	Hamburg	The ship was driven ashore and wrecked on Heligoland. She was on a voyage from Buenos Aires, Colonial Brazil to Hamburg.
Margaretta	Hamburg	The ship was lost in the Elbe. She was on a voyage from Hamburg to Tenerife, Canary Islands.
Mary	Great Britain	The ship was driven ashore at Great Yarmouth, Norfolk.
Maryana	Great Britain	The ship was driven ashore on Walcheren, Zeeland, Batavian Republic.
Phæton	Great Britain	The ship was lost at Guernsey. She was on voyage from London to Guernsey.
Princess Amelia	Great Britain	War of the Second Coalition: The ship was captured and burnt by the privateer Le Spartiate (France).
Rebecca	Bremen	The ship was holed by ice in the Weser and was abandoned by her crew. She was on a voyage from Lisbon to Bremen.
Robert & Jean	Great Britain	The ship was lost near Wexford, Ireland with the loss of all hands. She was on a voyage from Dundee, Perthshire to Dublin.
Tom	Great Britain	The ship was lost in Galway Bay. She was on a voyage from Liverpool to Limerick, Ireland.
Two Brothers	Great Britain	The ship was driven ashore near Margate. She was on a voyage from Sandwich to London.
Two Sisters	Great Britain	The ship ran aground on the Vogelsand. She was on a voyage from London to Bremen.
Vrow Christiana	Hanover	The ship was lost on the Haaks Bank, in the North Sea off Texel, North Holland, Batavian Republic. She was on a voyage from Surinam to Plymouth, Devon, Great Britain and Emden.
Vrow Heyla	Hanover	The ship was driven ashore in the Ems. She was on a voyage from London to Emden.
Vrow Jacoba	Hanover	The ship was wrecked on the Brouwers Plaat. She was on a voyage from London to Emden.
Vrow Maria Zeunisse	Batavian Republic	The ship was wrecked on the Western Bank, off Brielle, South Holland.
Vulture	Great Britain	War of the Second Coalition: The ship was captured and burnt by the privateer Le Spartiate (France).
West Indian	Great Britain	The ship foundered whilst on a voyage from Bristol, Gloucestershire to Antigua.
Worthy Ann	Great Britain	The ship was driven ashore and wrecked near "Kickhaven". She was on a voyage from Memel to London.

== April ==
=== 2 April ===
List of shipwrecks: 2 April 1799
Ship	State	Description
Betsy	United States	Quasi War:The schooner was captured on an unknown date by privateer "Prudent" (France), she was burned off Cuba.
Brilliant	United States	Quasi War:The sloop was captured by privateer "Prudent" (France), she was plundered and sunk off Cuba.

=== 5 April ===
List of shipwrecks: 5 April 1799
Ship	State	Description
Catherine	Great Britain	The ship foundered in the Firth of Forth off Inchcombe, Lothian whilst on a voyage from Liverpool, Lancashire to Hamburg. All fourteen crew were lost.
Molly	Great Britain	The ship was wrecked in the Bay of Luce. she was on a voyage from Liverpool to Hamburg.

=== 22 April ===
List of shipwrecks: 22 April 1799
Ship	State	Description
Hired armed cutter Brave	(Kingdom of Great Britain) Royal Navy	The 12-gun cutter was run down and sunk in the English Channel off Beachy Head, Sussex by Eclipse (Great Britain). Her crew were rescued.

=== Unknown date ===
List of shipwrecks: Unknown date in April 1799
Ship	State	Description
Active	Great Britain	The ship was lost on the north coast of England.
Allan	Great Britain	The ship was driven ashore and wrecked at Margate, Kent. She was on a voyage from London to Trinidada, Brazil.
Amity	Great Britain	The ship was wrecked on the coast of Ireland. She was on a voyage from London to Plymouth, Devon.
Ann	Great Britain	The ship foundered in the North Sea off Whitby, Yorkshire. Her crew were rescued.
Atlas	Great Britain	The ship was dismasted off the coast of Scotland and was abandoned. Her crew were rescued by the privateer Vigilant (France). Atlas was on a voyage from South Shields, County Durham to Gibraltar.
Auspicious	Great Britain	The ship was lost on the north coast of England.
Bacchus	Hamburg	War of the Second Coalition: The ship was captured by a privateer and was subsequently lost.
Bernard	Bremen	The ship was lost near Harlingen, Friesland, Batavian Republic. She was on a voyage from Bremen to Surinam.
Betsey	Great Britain	The ship was driven ashore and wrecked at Yarmouth, Isle of Wight. She was on a voyage from London to Lisbon, Portugal.
Blessing	Great Britain	The ship was lost on the north coast of England.
Britannia	Great Britain	The ship was driven ashore and wrecked at Yarmouth, Isle of Wight. She was on a voyage from Poole, Dorset to Lisbon.
Catherine	Great Britain	The ship struck a rock and foundered in the Firth of Forth off Leith, Lothian with the loss of all fourteen crew. She was on a voyage from Liverpool, Lancashire to Hamburg.
Charming Harriot	Great Britain	The ship was lost on the north coast of England.
Daphne	Great Britain	The ship was destroyed by fire off the coast of Scotland. She was on a voyage from Rotterdam, South Holland, Batavian Republic to a Scottish port.
Delight	Great Britain	The ship was wrecked on the Vineyard Sand. She was on a voyage from Gibraltar to Boston, Lincolnshire.
Die Gebroeders	Hamburg	The ship was driven ashore and wrecked in the Elbe. she was on a voyage from London to Hamburg.
Dolphin	Ireland	The ship ran aground on the North Bull, in the Irish Sea off Dublin. she was on a voyage from Boston to Dublin.
Elizabeth	Great Britain	The ship foundered in the North Sea.
Elizabeth and Margaret	Great Britain	The ship was lost on the north coast of England.
Experiment	Great Britain	The ship foundered in the Irish Sea off Dublin.
Francis	Great Britain	The ship was lost on the north coast of England.
Friendship	Great Britain	The ship was lost on the north coast of England.
Gemini	Great Britain	The ship was lost on the north coast of England.
George and Mary	Great Britain	The ship foundered in the North Sea.
Hambro' Commerce	Hamburg	The ship was wrecked in The Swin, in the Thames Estuary.
Handelsluft	Hamburg	The ship foundered in the North Sea off Texel, North Holland, Batavian Republic whilst on a voyage from Smyrna, Ottoman Empire to Hamburg.
Hans Falkenburg	Flag unknown	The ship was driven ashore near Aldeburgh, Suffolk, Great Britain.
Henrietta	Great Britain	The ship struck the pier at Ramsgate, Kent and sank. She was on a voyage from Ipswich, Suffolk to Aberdovey, Cardiganshire.
Jamaica	Great Britain	The ship was lost on the north coast of England.
John	Great Britain	The ship foundered in the North Sea.
Joseph and Mary	Great Britain	The ship was lost on the north coast of England.
Lord Loughborough	Great Britain	The ship was wrecked on the Haisborough Sands, in the North Sea off the coast of Norfolk. Her crew were rescued. She was on a voyage from South Shields to London.
HM hired armed ship Lord Mulgrave	(Kingdom of Great Britain) Royal Navy	The ship was wrecked on the Arklow Bank, in the Irish Sea.
Maria	Great Britain	The ship foundered in the North Sea.
Minerva	United States	The whaler was wrecked on the coast of South Georgia.
Neptunus	Hanover	The ship was wrecked on the Goodwin Sands, Kent. Her crew were rescued.
Ocean	Great Britain	The ship was lost on the north coast of England.
Oromocto	Great Britain	The ship foundered whilst on a voyage from Liverpool to New Brunswick, British North America. Her crew were rescued.
Pomona	Great Britain	The ship was driven ashore near Arklow, County Wicklow, Ireland. She was on a voyage from Liverpool to Tortola.
Prince of Wales	Great Britain	The ship foundered in the Irish Sea. Her crew were rescued by HMS Penguin ( (Kingdom of Great Britain) Royal Navy). Prince of Wales was on a voyage from Galway to Cork, Ireland.
Ranger	Great Britain	The ship foundered in the North Sea.
Spring Vale	Great Britain	The ship foundered in the Irish Sea off Dublin.
Stasette	Great Britain	The ship was lost near Stralsund. She was on a voyage from Elbing to London.
Susannah	Great Britain	The ship was wrecked near Donaghadee, County Down, Ireland with the loss of four of her crew. She was on a voyage from London to Liverpool.
Swallow	Great Britain	The brigantine foundered in the Atlantic Ocean 8 leagues (24 nautical miles (44 km) off Padstow, Cornwall whilst on a voyage from Swansea, Glamorgan to Falmouth, Cornwall. Her crew were rescued by London Packet (Great Britain).
Tagus	Great Britain	The ship was lost on the north coast of England.
Thetis	Great Britain	The ship was lost on the north coast of England.
Thomas and Mary	Great Britain	The ship foundered off São Miguel Island, Azores. She was on a voyage from Topsham, Devon to São Miguel Island.
Vrouw Metta	Hanover	The ship was wrecked on the coast of Holland. Her crew were rescued. She was on a voyage from London to Emden.
Unnamed	Great Britain	The ship foundered in the North Sea.

== May ==
=== 8 May ===
List of shipwrecks: May 1807
Ship	State	Description
HMS Dame de Grace	(Kingdom of Great Britain) Royal Navy	The gun-brig was captured and scuttled by Salamine (French Navy).

=== 18 May ===
List of shipwrecks: 18 May 1799
Ship	State	Description
Peggy	Great Britain	The whaler foundered off the coast of Greenland. Her crew were rescued.

=== 21 May ===
List of shipwrecks: 21 May 1799
Ship	State	Description
Martha and Ann	Great Britain	The ship was wrecked on the Kentish Knock Sands in the North Sea whilst on a voyage from King's Lynn, Norfolk to Emsworth, Hampshire. Her crew were rescued by the collier brig Palladium (Great Britain).
Unnamed	Great Britain	The collier brig was wrecked on the Kentish Knock with the loss of all hands.

=== 23 May ===
List of shipwrecks: 23 May 1799
Ship	State	Description
HMS Deux Amis	(Kingdom of Great Britain) Royal Navy	The ship foundered in the English Channel off the Isle of Wight. Her crew were rescued.

=== Unknown date ===
List of shipwrecks: Unknown date in May 1799
Ship	State	Description
Angermanland	Flag unknown	The ship struck the Conger Rocks and was severely damaged. She was on a voyage from Bristol, Gloucestershire, Great Britain to St. Andero, Spain. She put back to Bristol.
Caroline	Great Britain	The ship was lost in the Isles of Scilly. Her crew were rescued. She was on a voyage from São Miguel Island, Azores to London.
Chance	Great Britain	War of the Second Coalition: The East Indiaman, which had been previously captured by Forte (French Navy) and later recaptured by HMS Jupiter ( (Kingdom of Great Britain) Royal Navy), was wrecked in St. Mary's Bay, Madagascar.
Charles & Henry	Great Britain	The ship was lost on the coast of Holland. She was on a voyage from Plymouth, Devon to Hamburg.
Elizabeth	Great Britain	The ship, which had been capgured by a French privateer in the Bay of Bengal, was captured by HMS Star (Royal Navy) on 7 May. She subsequently foundered.
George	Great Britain	The ship foundered in the North Sea. Her crew were rescued.
Lark	Great Britain	War of the Second Coalition: The ship was captured and burnt by the privateer Mars (France). She was on a voyage from Poole, Dorset to Newfoundland, British North America.
Le Creseur	French Navy	The ship foundered in the Mediterranean Sea off Toulon, Var. There were only 24 survivors.
Pearl	Great Britain	The ship was driven ashore in Bootle Bay. She was on a voyage from Liverpool, Lancashire to Smyrna, Ottoman Empire.
Phoenix	Russian-American Company	The ship foundered in the Pacific Ocean off the coast of Russian America around 21–23 May with the loss of at least three lives, including that of Joasaph Bolotov, Auxiliary Bishop of Kodiak.
Success	Great Britain	The ship was lost in Mount's Bay. She was on a voyage from Plymouth to Liverpool.
Vrow Clazina	Flag unknown	War of the Second Coalition: The ship was captured by a privateer. She was subsequently lost at Figueira da Foz, Portugal. Vrow Clazina was on a voyage from Dover, Kent, Great Britain to Lisbon, Portugal.

== June ==
=== 2 June ===
List of shipwrecks: 2 June 1799
Ship	State	Description
Neptune	Great Britain	The ship departed from Savannah, Georgia, United States for Stromness, Orkney Islands and Leith, Lothian. No further trace, presumed foundered in the Atlantic Ocean with the loss of all hands.

=== 13 June ===
List of shipwrecks: 13 June 1799
Ship	State	Description
Hoeffnang	Batavian Republic	The ship was wrecked on the Goodwin Sands, Kent, Great Britain. There were twenty survivors. She was on a voyage from Hamburg to Málaga, Spain,

=== Unknown date ===
List of shipwrecks: Unknown date in June 1799
Ship	State	Description
Adolphus Frederick	Flag unknown	The ship was destroyed by fire at Málaga, Spain.
Dorothea	Bremen	The ship was abandoned off Málaga. Her crew were rescued by Withywood (Great Britain). Dorothea was on a voyage from Livorno, Grand Duchy of Tuscany to Bremen.
Embden Packet	Hanover	The ship was lost in the Elbe. She was on a voyage from London, Great Britain to Hamburg.
Europa	Great Britain	The ship was driven ashore in the Deptford Creek. She was on a voyage from London to Menorca, Spain.
Flora	(Sweden) Swedish Pomerania	The ship was lost near Great Yarmouth, Norfolk, Great Britain.
Hercules	Great Britain	The ship was driven ashore at Málaga.
Hoffnung	Hamburg	The ship was wrecked on the Goodwin Sands, Kent, Great Britain. Her crew were rescued. She was on a voyage from Hamburg to Málaga.
Mary	Great Britain	The ship was lost in the Orkney Islands. She was on a voyage from Liverpool, Lancashire to Saint Petersburg, Russia.
William	Great Britain	The ship was driven ashore and wrecked on Saltholm, Denmark. She was on a voyage from London to Memel, Prussia.

== July ==
=== 6 July ===
List of shipwrecks: 6 July 1799
Ship	State	Description
Mary	Ireland	The ship was abandoned on the Atlantic Ocean (40°N 12°W). She was on a voyage from Porto, Portugal to Galway.

=== 7 July ===
List of shipwrecks: 7 July 1799
Ship	State	Description
Fortitude	United States	The ship struck rocks at Ascension Island and was severely damaged. Seventeen of her 38 crew abandoned ship. The other 21 were presumed to have been lost when the ship foundered. Fortitude was on a voyage from India to New York.

=== 10 July ===
List of shipwrecks: 10 July 1799
Ship	State	Description
John	United States	Quasi-War: The ship was captured and burnt by the French at Porto Praya, Cape Verde Islands.

=== 11 July ===
List of shipwrecks: 11 July 1799
Ship	State	Description
Betsey	Great Britain	The ship departed from British Honduras. No further trace, presumed foundered in the Atlantic Ocean with the loss of all hands.

=== 14 July ===
List of shipwrecks: 14 July 1799
Ship	State	Description
Britta Margarita (Бритта Маргарита)	Imperial Russian Navy	The transport ship was driven ashore and wrecked on Zapadny Beryozovy of Beryozovye Islands in the Gulf of Finland with the loss of one crew member.

=== Unknown date ===
List of shipwrecks: Unknown date in July 1799
Ship	State	Description
Ceres	Great Britain	War of the Second Coalition: The ship was captured and sunk by the privateer Resolu (France). She was on a voyage from Whitehaven, Cumberland to Hull, Yorkshire.
HMS Contest	(Kingdom of Great Britain) Royal Navy	The 14-gun gun-vessel foundered in the North Sea off the Dutch coast. Her crew were rescued.
USS Connecticut	United States Navy	During fitting out, probably on or just before 7 July the unfinished frigate foundered. She was refloated and finished.
Frau Helena Hindreig	Hanover	The ship was driven ashore and wrecked at Lowestoft, Suffolk, Great Britain. She was on a voyage from Leer, Hanover to London, Great Britain.
Hoffnung	Stettin	The ship was driven ashore at Skagen, Denmark. She was on a voyage from Stettin to London, Great Britain.
Juno	Great Britain	The ship was driven ashore and wrecked at Liverpool, Lancashire. She was on a voyage from Antigua to Liverpool.
Langley's Increase	Great Britain	War of the Second Coalition: The ship was captured and burnt. She was on a voyage from Lisbon to Porto, Portugal.
Mary Ann	Great Britain	The ship was driven ashore and wrecked at Liverpool. She was on a voyage from Demerara to Liverpool.
Navigator	Great Britain	The ship was lost near The Lizard, Cornwall. She was on a voyage from Tobago to London.
Sophia	United States	The ship was lost off Texel, North Holland, Batavian Republic. She was on a voyage from Hamburg to Baltimore, Maryland.
Surcheance	Batavian Republic	The ship foudered in the Atlantic Ocean. She was on a voyage from Saint Helena to Cork, Ireland with the loss of a crew member.

== August ==
=== 6 August ===
List of shipwrecks: 6 August 1799
Ship	State	Description
Seaforth	United States	Quasi-War: The ship was attacked by a French privateer. She was subsequently wrecked on Barbuda. She was on a voyage from New York, United States to Barbuda.

=== 7 August ===
List of shipwrecks: 7 August 1799
Ship	State	Description
Carolina	Ireland	The ship capsized in the English Channel off Poole, Dorset, Great Britain. Her crew were rescued by HMS Tickler ( (Kingdom of Great Britain) Royal Navy). Carolina was on a voyage from Ystad, Sweden to Dublin. She was later taken in to Portsmouth, Hampshire, Great Britain.

=== 21 August ===
List of shipwrecks: 21 August 1799
Ship	State	Description
Bee	Great Britain	The ship foundered in the English Channel off the Deadman. Her crew were rescued. She was on a voyage from Falmouth, Cornwall to Guernsey, Channel Islands.

=== 27 August ===
List of shipwrecks: 27 August 1799
Ship	State	Description
Retvizan (Ретвизан, 'Rättvisan')	Imperial Russian Navy	Vlieter incident: The ship of the line ran aground off Texel, North Holland, Batavian Republic. She was refloated.

=== 30 August ===
List of shipwrecks: 30 August 1799
Ship	State	Description
HMS America	Royal Navy	Vlieter incident: The Intrepid-class ship of the line ran aground off Texel, North Holland, Batavian Republic. She was refloated, but ran aground again.
HMS Latona	Royal Navy	Vlieter incident: The fifth rate ran aground off Texel.

=== Unknown date ===
List of shipwrecks: Unknown date in August 1799
Ship	State	Description
Maria Carolina	Portugal	The ship sank at the mouth of the River Liffey. She was on a voyage from Porto to Dublin, Ireland.
Morning Star	Great Britain	The ship was driven ashore at Portsmouth, Hampshire. She was on a voyage from London to Jamaica.
Resolution	Ireland	War of the Second Coalition: The ship was captured and sunk by the French. She was on a voyage from Guernsey, Channel Islands to Gibraltar.

== September ==
=== 1 September ===
List of shipwrecks: 1 September 1799
Ship	State	Description
Hiram	Great Britain	The ship was driven ashore at the mouth of the River Dee. She was on a voyage from Boston to Liverpool, Lancashire.

=== 10 September ===
List of shipwrecks: 10 September 1799
Ship	State	Description
Nymph	(Kingdom of Great Britain) Sierra Leone Company	The brig foundered with the loss of one of her sixteen crew. The survivors were rescued by HMS Penelope ( (Kingdom of Great Britain) Royal Navy). She was on a voyage from London to Sierral Leone.
Three unnamed vessels	Flags unknown	The ships foundered or capsized.

=== 11 September ===
List of shipwrecks: 11 September 1799
Ship	State	Description
Lucy	Great Britain	The ship was wrecked on the coast of Labrador, British North America. She was on a voyage from Quebec City, Lower Canada, British North America to Greenock, Renfrewshire.
Neptune	Great Britain	The ship foundered whilst on a voyage from Gosport, Hampshire to Demerara.

=== 14 September ===
List of shipwrecks: 14 September 1799
Ship	State	Description
Fynn, or Phyn	Great Britain	The ship foundered. Her crew were rescued. She was on a voyage from Palermo, Sicily to London.

=== 16 September ===
List of shipwrecks: 16 September 1799
Ship	State	Description
Violet	United States	The schooner was capsized and sunk by a waterspout at (27°30′N 62°00′W). 14 days later the survivors were rescued by HMS Carnatic (Royal Navy). Four perished during the ordeal.

=== 18 September ===
List of shipwrecks: 18 September 1799
Ship	State	Description
Wilhelmina Catharina	Hamburg	The ship was driven ashore near Cayenne, French Guiana.

=== 22 September ===
List of shipwrecks: 22 September 1799
Ship	State	Description
Concord	Great Britain	The ship was lost in the English Channel off Abbotsbury, Dorset.
De Trende Sodikend	Flag unknown	The ship was beached at Abbotsbury.
Queen	Great Britain	The ship ran onto the South Bull entering Dublin harbour, Ireland. Fourteen passengers were washed overboard and twelve of them were lost.
Rodney	Great Britain	The ship was beached at Abbotsbury.
Unnamed	Flag unknown	The collier foundered off Howth, County Dublin, Ireland with the loss of all hands.

=== 28 September ===
List of shipwrecks: 28 September 1799
Ship	State	Description
HMS Blanche	(Kingdom of Great Britain) Royal Navy	The Hermione-class frigate ran aground off Texel, North Holland, Batavian Republic. She was declared a constructive total loss.
HMS Fox	(Kingdom of Great Britain) Royal Navy	The schooner was wrecked in the Gulf of Mexico. Her crew were rescued.
Wilhelmina Catherina	Hamburg	The ship was driven ashore and wrecked near Cayenne, French Guiana.

=== Unknown date ===
List of shipwrecks: Unknown date in September 1799
Ship	State	Description
Ann and Sally	Great Britain	The ship was lost in Ramsay Sound. She was on a voyage from Liverpool, Lancashire to St. Ives, Cornwall.
Argo	Great Britain	The ship was driven ashore at Plymouth, Devon.
Argus	Great Britain	The ship was driven ashore at Liverpool. She was on a voyage from Quebec City, Lower Canada, British North America to Liverpool.
Bangalore	Great Britain	War of the Second Coalition: The ship was captured and sunk in the North Sea by two French privateers.
Betsey	United States	The ship ran aground off Hogland, Russia. Her crew were rescued.
Concord	Great Britain	The ship was lost at Portland, Dorset. Her crew were rescued.
Dorothea Elizabeth	Stettin	The ship was wrecked on the south coast of the Isle of Wight, Great Britain. She was on a voyage from Stettin to Liverpool.
Fortune	Great Britain	The ship was abandoned in the Baltic Sea.
Friends	Great Britain	The ship was driven ashore at Great Yarmouth, Norfolk. She was on a voyage from Hull, Yorkshire to London.
Goodintent	Ireland	The ship was driven ashore near Penzance, Cornwall Great Britain. She was on a voyage from Cork to Guernsey, Channel Islands.
Mary	Great Britain	War of the Second Coalition: The ship was captured and sunk in the North Sea by two French privateers.
Mary	Great Britain	The ship was lost in the Humber with the loss of all but one of her crew. She was on a voyage from Saint Petersburg, Russia to Hull.
May	Great Britain	War of the Second Coalition: The ship was captured and sunk in the North Sea by two French privateers.
Moor	Hamburg	The ship was detained by HMS Eurydice ( (Kingdom of Great Britain) Royal Navy). She was subsequently lost off the Isle of Wight. Moor was on a voyage from Havana, Cuba to Hamburg.
Nancy	Great Britain	War of the Second Coalition: The ship was captured in the Mediterranean Sea. She was subsequently driven ashore and wrecked near Estepona, Spain whilst evading HMS Pallas ( (Kingdom of Great Britain) Royal Navy). Nancy was on a voyage from Messina, Sicily to Liverpool.
Norfolk	Great Britain	The ship struck the pier at Ramsgate, Kent and sank. She was on a voyage from King's Lynn, Norfolk to Bridport, Dorset.
Rodney	Great Britain	The ship was lost at Portland. Her crew were rescued She was on a voyage from Topsham, Devon to Sunderland, County Durham.
Sally	United States	Quasi War:The schooner was captured on 9 September by privateer "Le Importe" (France) off Suriname, she was burned sometime on/after the 15th.
Sarah	Great Britain	The ship was wrecked on The Manacles. She was on a voyage from Falmouth, Cornwall to the West Indies.
Three Relations	Ireland	The ship was lost at Portland. Her crew were rescued. She was on a voyage from Cork to Norway.
Tyron	Great Britain	War of the Second Coalition: The ship was captured and sunk in the North Sea by two French privateers.
Venus	Great Britain	The ship was run down and sunk in the Baltic Sea off Gothenburg, Sweden. She was on a voyage from Dysart, Fife to a Baltic port.

== October ==
=== 1 October ===
List of shipwrecks: 1 October 1799
Ship	State	Description
Norfolk	Great Britain	The ship struck the pier at Ramsgate, Kent and sank. She was on a voyage from King's Lynn, Norfolk to Bridport, Dorset.

=== 2 September ===
List of shipwrecks: 2 September 1799
Ship	State	Description
Unnamed	France	Quasi War:The privateer schooner blew up and sank in a battle with merchantman "Chesapeake" (United States) 37 miles north of Havana, Cuba, lost with all hands.

=== 3 October ===
List of shipwrecks: 3 October 1799
Ship	State	Description
Grange	Great Britain	The ship was abandoned whilst on a voyage from Jamaica to London. Her crew were rescued by Seaflower (Great Britain).
Mairton Hall	Great Britain	The ship was wrecked on the Barbary Coast. Her crew were rescued.

=== 9 October ===
List of shipwrecks: 9 October 1799
Ship	State	Description
HMS Lutine	(Kingdom of Great Britain) Royal Navy	HMS Lutine. The Magicienne-class frigate was wrecked off Vlieland, Friesland, Batavian Republic with the loss of about 240 lives. There was one survivor.

=== 10 October ===
List of shipwrecks: 10 October 1799
Ship	State	Description
Nelly & Ann	Great Britain	The ship departed from Grenada for Liverpool, Lancashire. No further trace, presumed foundered in the Atlantic Ocean with the loss of all hands.

=== 14 October ===
List of shipwrecks: 14 October 1799
Ship	State	Description
HMS Nassau	(Kingdom of Great Britain) Royal Navy	The troopship was wrecked on the Kicks sandbar off Texel, North Holland, Batavian Republic with the loss of about 100 lives, including 42 of her crew. There were 205 survivors.

=== 16 October ===
List of shipwrecks: 16 October 1799
Ship	State	Description
Venus	Royal Navy	The Venus-class frigate ran aground on the Thrumb Cop Rock, 9 nautical miles (17 km) off Halifax, Nova Scotia, British America. She was on a voyage from an English port to Halifax. She was refloated and taken in to Halifax in a severely leaky condition. She was placed under repair.

=== 17 October ===
List of shipwrecks: 17 October 1799
Ship	State	Description
Frances	Great Britain	The ship departed from Falmouth, Cornwall for Halifax, Nova Scotia, British North America. She parted from the convoy three days later. No further trace, presumed foundered with the loss of all hands.

=== 18 October ===
List of shipwrecks: 18 October 1799
Ship	State	Description
HMS Impregnable	(Kingdom of Great Britain) Royal Navy	The second rate ship-of-the-line was wrecked off Langstone, Hampshire. Her crew were rescued.

=== 22 October ===
List of shipwrecks: 22 October 1799
Ship	State	Description
Royal Admiral	Great Britain	The East Indiaman was driven ashore at Woodbridge, Suffolk. She was refloated with assistance and taken in to Harwich, Essex.

=== 23 October ===
List of shipwrecks: 23 October 1799
Ship	State	Description
Washington	Great Britain	The ship was destroyed by fire at Falmouth, Cornwall. She was on a voyage from Lisbon, Portugal to Liverpool, Lancashire.

=== 25 October ===
List of shipwrecks: 25 October 1799
Ship	State	Description
HMS Amaranthe	(Kingdom of Great Britain) Royal Navy	The brig-sloop foundered in the Atlantic Ocean off Cape Canaveral, Florida.

=== 31 October ===
List of shipwrecks: 31 October 1799
Ship	State	Description
Charente	French Navy	The Capricieuse-class frigate ran aground at the mouth of the river Blavet on the Brittany coast of France and was wrecked.

=== Unknown date ===
List of shipwrecks: Unknown date in October 1799
Ship	State	Description
Adamant	Great Britain	The ship was lost at Falster, Denmark. Her crew were rescued.
Ann	Great Britain	The ship was wrecked at the mouth of the Humber whilst on a voyage from Hamburg to Lisbon, Portugal.
Black Ey'd Susan	Ireland	War of the Second Coalition: The ship was captured and burnt by Thetis (Spanish Navy). Black Ey'd Susan was on a voyage from Cork to Lisbon.
Ceres	United States	The ship was wrecked on Anguna Island. Her crew survived.
Conqueror	Great Britain	The ship foundered whilst on a voyage from Portsmouth, Hampshire to Lisbon, Portugal.
Countess of Caithness	Great Britain	The ship was wrecked on the Burbo Bank, in Liverpool Bay. she was on a voyage from Londonderry, Ireland to Liverpool, Lancashire.
Euphemia	Great Britain	The ship was driven ashore on Öland, Sweden. She was on a voyage from Leith, Lothian to Saint Petersburg, Russia.
Europa	Prussia	The ship was driven ashore on Bornholm, Denmark. She was on a voyage from Königsburg to London, Great Britain.
Happy Chance	Great Britain	The ship foundered.
Hope	Great Britain	The ship foundered in the North Sea off the mouth of the Humber. She was on a voyage from Sunderland, County Durham to London.
Isabella	Great Britain	The ship was driven ashore near "Hornbeck".
Jannet & Peggy	Great Britain	The ship was driven ashore in Bootle Bay. She was on a voyage from Hamburg to Liverpool.
Jonge Zeelust	Batavian Republic	The ship sank off Texel, North Holland whilst on a voyage from London to Den Helder, North Holland.
Peggy	Great Britain	The ship was lost near Montrose, Forfarshire. She was on a voyage from Danzig to Montrose.
Polly	Ireland	The ship foundered in the Irish Sea off Coleraine, County Antrim whilst on a voyage from Belfast, County Antrim to the United States.
Quintillon	Great Britain	The ship was wrecked on the Herd Sand, in the North Sea off the coast of County Durham. She was on a voyage from Saint Petersburg to South Shields, County Durham.
San Joseph	Kingdom of Sicily	The ship was driven ashore at Whitstable, Kent, Great Britain. She was on a voyage from Palermo to London, Great Britain.

== November ==
=== 1 November ===
List of shipwrecks: 1 November 1799
Ship	State	Description
Guernsey Lily	Great Britain	The transport ship struck the Cross Sand, in the North Sea off the coast of Norfolk and consequently foundered. All on board were rescued.

=== 2 November ===
List of shipwrecks: 2 November 1799
Ship	State	Description
No. 1	Imperial Russian Navy	The brigantine was driven ashore and wrecked at Yevpatoria. Her crew were rescued.

=== 4 November ===
List of shipwrecks: 4 November 1799
Ship	State	Description
Betsey	Great Britain	The ship was struck by lightning and foundered with the loss of a crew member. She was on a voyage from New Providence, New Jersey, United States to London.

=== 5 November ===
List of shipwrecks: 5 November 1799
Ship	State	Description
Annubrus	United States	The ship was driven ashore and wrecked in Table Bay, Africa. She was on a voyage from India to Boston, Massachusetts.
Hannah	United States	The ship was driven ashore in Table Bay. She was on a voyage from India to Boston, Massachusetts.
HDMS Oldenburg	Royal Dano-Norwegian Navy	The fourth rate ship of the line was driven ashore and wrecked in Table Bay. Her crew were rescued.
HMS Sceptre	(Kingdom of Great Britain) Royal Navy	The third rate ship-of-the-line was driven ashore in Table Bay and was wrecked with the loss of about 350 lives. There were 42 survivors.
Sierra Leone	Great Britain	The whaler was driven ashore and wrecked in Table Bay. She was on a voyage from the South Seas to London.

=== 6 November ===
List of shipwrecks: 6 November 1799
Ship	State	Description
Unamed	Great Britain	The transport ship ran aground and sank on Scroby Sands, Norfolk with the loss of 74 of the 79 people on board.

=== 12 November ===
List of shipwrecks: 12 November 1799
Ship	State	Description
Bhavani	Great Britain	War of the Second Coalition: The full-rigged ship of 650 tons (bm) was wrecked on the coast of France 3 nautical miles (5.6 km) west of Boulogne-sur-Mer, Pas-de-Calais, during a gale with the loss of 24 lives. Her survivors were taken prisoner by the French. She was on a voyage from Calcutta, India, to London.
Henrietta	United States	The ship sprang a leak off the Grand Banks of Newfoundland and was abandoned by her crew. She was on a voyage from Baltimore, Maryland to Hamburg.

=== 15 November ===
List of shipwrecks: 15 November 1799
Ship	State	Description
Unnamed	France	Quasi War:The piratical armed barge, captured on 7 November by USS Boston (United States Navy), was scuttled on orders of Capt. Silas Talbot, of USS Constitution (United States Navy) 6 leagues south west of Cape Francois.

=== 17 November ===
List of shipwrecks: 17 November 1799
Ship	State	Description
HMS Espion	(Kingdom of Great Britain) Royal Navy	The 38-gun frigate was wrecked on the Goodwin Sands, Kent. All on board were rescued.

=== 21 November ===
List of shipwrecks: 21 November 1799
Ship	State	Description
Lovely Mary	Great Britain	The ship departed Burin, Newfoundland, British North America for Portugal. No further trace, presumed foundered in the Atlantic Ocean with the loss of all hands.
Otter	Great Britain	The ship foundered in Cardigan Bay. Her crew survived. She was on a voyage from Liverpool, Lancashire to London.

=== 27 November ===
List of shipwrecks: 27 November 1799
Ship	State	Description
No. 1	Imperial Russian Navy	The transport ship was driven ashore and wrecked on sv:Långön Island with the loss of nine of her fifteen crew. Another source gives the date as 27 October.

=== Unknown date ===
List of shipwrecks: Unknown date in November 1799
Ship	State	Description
Admiral Nelson	Great Britain	The ship was driven ashore at Gunthorpe, Lincolnshire. She was on a voyage from Palermo, Sicily to Hull, Yorkshire.
Adroit	Great Britain	The ship was wrecked at Padstow, Cornwall with the loss of three of her crew. She was on a voyage from Glasgow, Renfrewshire to the West Indies.
Aid	Great Britain	The ship ran aground on The Needing, Isle of Wight and was wrecked. She was on a voyage from Riga, Russia to Lisbon, Portugal.
Amity	Great Britain	The ship was wrecked on Islay. She was on a voyage from Saint Petersburg, Russia to Liverpool, Lancashire.
Ann	Great Britain	The ship ran aground on the Sandhammer Reef. She was on a voyage from Saint Petersburg to London.
Aurora	Great Britain	The ship was driven ashore near Saltcoats, Ayrshire. She was on a voyage from Lancaster, Lancashire to Saint Thomas, Virgin Islands.
Belfast	Ireland	The ship foundered in the Irish Sea with the loss of all hands. She was on a voyage from Liverpool to Belfast, County Antrim.
Camelia	Great Britain	The transport ship was driven ashore at Great Yarmouth, Norfolk. All on board were rescued.
Defiance	Great Britain	The ship was lost at Den Helder, North Holland, Batavian Republic. All on board were rescued.
Dragon	Great Britain	War of the Second Coalition: The ship was captured. She was recaptured but was subsequently lost on the coast of Ireland. Dragon was on a voyage from Poole, Dorset to Newfoundland, British North America.
Ellis	Great Britain	The ship was driven ashore in Bootle Bay. She was on a voyage from Liverpool to Africa.
Endracht	Hamburg	The ship was lost whilst on a voyage from Hamburg to London.
Endside	Great Britain	The ship was driven ashore and wrecked at Blackpool, County Cork, Ireland with the loss of all hands. She was on a voyage from Liverpool to Newry, County Armagh, Ireland.
Fame	Great Britain	The ship was lost on the Little Wrangol. She was on a voyage from Saint Petersburg to Dundee, Perthshire.
Fanny	Ireland	The ship was driven ashore and wrecked at Pwllheli, Caernarfonshire whilst on a voyage from Martinique to Liverpool.
Fanny	Great Britain	The ship was driven ashore near Saint Petersburg. She was on a voyage from Saint Petersburg to Chester, Cheshire.
Federal George	United States	Quasi-War The ship was captured and recaptured but was subsequently lost on the coast of France. Her crew were rescued. She was on a voyage from Bristol, Gloucestershire, Great Britain to New York.
Frederick Julius Kaas	(Denmark) Norway	The ship was lost near Plymouth, Devon, Great Britain. Her crew were rescued. She was on a voyage from Plymouth to Norway.
Friendship	Great Britain	The ship was driven ashore at Liverpool. She was on a voyage from Jamaica to Liverpool.
Friendship	Great Britain	The ship ran aground on the Burbo Bank, in Liverpool Bay. She was on a voyage from Virginia, United States to Liverpool.
Hannah	Ireland	The ship was driven ashore on Saaremaa, Russia. She was on a voyage from Saint Petersburg to Dublin.
Hero	Great Britain	The ship was lost at Barmouth, Merionethshire. She was on a voyage from Lisbon to Liverpool.
Hope	Great Britain	The ship was lost with all hands. She was on a voyage from Liverpool to Belfast.
Jane	Great Britain	The ship was driven ashore and wrecked near Reval, Russia. She was on a voyage from Saint Petersburg to London.
Lord Nelson	Great Britain	The ship was driven ashore on Colonsay. She was on a voyage from Saint Petersburg to Liverpool.
Malvina	Portugal	The ship caught fire at Portsmouth, Hampshire, Great Britain and was scuttled. She was on a voyage from Riga to Lisbon.
Melcombe	Great Britain	The ship was driven ashore in St Brides Bay. She was on a voyage from Porto, Portugal to Bristol.
Mentor	Great Britain	The ship ran aground on The Needing and was wrecked. She was on a voyage from Saint Petersburg to Liverpool.
Minerva	Great Britain	The ship was wrecked at Dundalk, County Louth, Ireland whilst on a voyage from Chester to Newry, County Down. Her crew were rescued.
Nautilus	Great Britain	The ship was lost at Great Yarmouth. She was on a voyage from Sunderland, County Durham to Weymouth, Dorset.
Nostra Senora di Rosario	Trieste	The ship sank at Ramsgate, Kent, Great Britain. She was on a voyage from Trieste to Hamburg.
HMS Orestes	(Kingdom of Great Britain) Royal Navy	The brig-sloop foundered in the Indian Ocean on or about 5 November with the loss of all hands.
Otter	Great Britain	The ship foundered in the Irish Sea off Cardigan whilst on a voyage from Liverpool to London. Her crew were rescued.
St. Tammany	Great Britain	The ship was wrecked on the coast of County Antrim. She was on a voyage from Liverpool to Savannah, Georgia, United States.
Swallow	Great Britain	The ship was abandoned at sea. She was on a voyage from Liverpool to Guernsey, Channel Islands. She was subsequently taken in to Falmouth, Cornwall.
Union	Great Britain	The ship was driven ashore at Falmouth. She was on a voyage from Lisbon to Bristol.
William & Elizabeth	Great Britain	The ship was lost near Arundal, Norway. She was on a voyage from Leith, Lothian to Danzig.
Williamson	Great Britain	The ship ran aground on The Shingles, Isle of Wight.
Unnamed	France	On 7 November the French barge, of piratical nature, was captured by USS Boston. Being too small to be sent to the U.S. for adjudication, the Captains of USS Boston and USS Norfolk decided to scuttle it, date probably on or about 7 Nov.

== December ==
=== 2 December ===
List of shipwrecks: 2 December 1799
Ship	State	Description
Flora	Great Britain	The brig was wrecked on Butt of Lewis with the loss of all hands. She was on a voyage from Saint Petersburg, Russia to Dublin, Ireland.
Syren	Great Britain	The ship was lost at Porto, Portugal.

=== 6 December ===
List of shipwrecks: 6 December 1799
Ship	State	Description
John Brickwood	Great Britain	The ship departed from The Downs for Baltimore, Maryland, United States. No further trace, presumed foundered with the loss of all hands.

=== 10 December ===
List of shipwrecks: 10 December 1799
Ship	State	Description
Alexander	Great Britain	The ship was driven ashore at Gibraltar. She was on a voyage from Bristol, Gloucestershire to Livorno.
Friendship	Great Britain	The ship was lost off Gibraltar. She was on a voyage from Poole, Dorset to Livorno.
Mary	Great Britain	The ship was driven ashore at Gibraltar. She was on a voyage from Dartmouth, Devon to Naples, Kingdom of Sicily
Paragon	Great Britain	The brig foundered off Gibraltar whilst on a voyage from London to Gibraltar.
Minerva	Great Britain	The ship was driven ashore at Gibraltar.
Riches, or Rikhes	Portugal	The ship was driven ashore at Gibraltar and wrecked.
Robert	Great Britain	The ship was driven ashore at Gibraltar. She was on a voyage from London to Livorno. She was later refloated.

=== 12 December ===
List of shipwrecks: 14 December 1799
Ship	State	Description
Union	Great Britain	The ship was damaged by fire at Leith, Lothian.

=== 14 December ===
List of shipwrecks: 14 December 1799
Ship	State	Description
Robina	Great Britain	The ship was departed Leith, Lothian for the Orkney Islands. No further trace, presumed foundered with the loss of all hands.

=== 16 December ===
List of shipwrecks: 16 December 1799
Ship	State	Description
Minerva	Great Britain	The ship was driven ashore at Gibraltar and wrecked.
Rachel	Great Britain	The ship was driven ashore at Gibraltar and wrecked.

=== 18 December ===
List of shipwrecks: 18 December 1799
Ship	State	Description
Charlotte	Sweden	The ship was wrecked at Great Yarmouth, Norfolk, Great Britain.

=== 19 December ===
List of shipwrecks: 19 December 1799
Ship	State	Description
Mildred	Great Britain	The ship departed from Jamaica for Savannah, Georgia, United States. No further trace, presumed foundered in the Atlantic Ocean with the loss of all hands.

=== 23 December ===
List of shipwrecks: 23 December 1799
Ship	State	Description
Mary	Great Britain	The ship was abandoned in the Atlantic Ocean (approximately 52°N 27°W) whilst on a voyage from Tortola to London. Her crew were rescued by General Washington (United States).

=== 25 December ===
List of shipwrecks: 25 December 1799
Ship	State	Description
HMS Ethalion	(Kingdom of Great Britain) Royal Navy	The Artois-class frigate ran aground off the Penmarks, Finistère, France and was wrecked. HMS Danae, HMS Sylph, and the hired armed cutter Nimrod (all (Kingdom of Great Britain) Royal Navy), rescued her crew.

=== 26 December ===
List of shipwrecks: 26 December 1799
Ship	State	Description
Collins	Great Britain	The collier was driven ashore at Hartlepool, County Durham and wrecked. Her crew were rescued.

=== 27 December ===
List of shipwrecks: 27 December 1799
Ship	State	Description
Ajax	Great Britain	The ship was driven ashore at Sunderland, County Durham and wrecked with the loss of a crew member. She was on her maiden voyage.
Brothers	Great Britain	The ship sprang a leak and was abandoned by her crew. She was on a voyage from Jamaica to the Clyde.
Three unnamed vessels	Great Britain	The fishing vessels capsized off Filey, Yorkshire with the loss of all nine crew.

=== 28 December ===
List of shipwrecks: 28 December 1799
Ship	State	Description
Polly	United States	Quasi War:The captured American schooner was engaged by USS Connecticut (United States Navy). The prize crew then ran her ashore a League west of Point Chateaux, after a fight with the prize crew, who were on shore, it was found to be impossible to refloat her and she was burned.

=== 29 December ===
List of shipwrecks: 29 December 1799
Ship	State	Description
Brothers	Great Britain	The ship foundered in the Atlantic Ocean. Her crew were rescued. she was on a voyage from Jamaica to the Clyde.
HDMS Hvide Ørn	Royal Dano-Norwegian Navy	The frigate foundered off Corsica, France with the loss of all hands.

=== 30 December ===
List of shipwrecks: 30 December 1799
Ship	State	Description
Mary	Great Britain	The ship was abandoned in the Atlantic Ocean (52°N 27°W). Her crew were rescued by General Washington (United States). Mary was on a voyage from Tortola to Liverpool, Lancashire.

=== Unknown date ===
List of shipwrecks: Unknown date in December 1799
Ship	State	Description
Alexander	Great Britain	The ship was driven ashore at Gibraltar. She was on a voyage from Gibraltar to Livorno, Grand Duchy of Tuscany.
Amphitrite	Great Britain	The ship capsized at New Calabar, Africa.
Ann	Great Britain	War of the Second Coalition: The ship was captured and destroyed by the privateer La Revenge (France. She was on a voyage from Virginia, United States to London.
Aurora	Great Britain	The ship was [erroneously] reported lost near Kronstadt, Russia. She was on a voyage from Saint Petersburg, Russia to London.
Bella	Great Britain	The ship was lost on the Nore, in the Thames Estuary. She was on a voyage from Gainsborough, Lincolnshire to London.
Bee	Great Britain	The ship was driven ashore at Great Yarmouth, Norfolk.
Campigniet	(Denmark) Norway	The brig was driven ashore and wrecked at Pakefield, Suffolk, Great Britain with the loss of all but two of her crew. She was on a voyage from Dram to Marazion, Cornwall, Great Britain.
Caroline	Great Britain	The ship, a cartel, was driven ashore and wrecked at Weymouth, Dorset.
Collins	Great Britain	The ship was driven ashore and wrecked near Hartlepool, County Durham. Her crew were rescued. She was on a voyage from Newcastle upon Tyne, Northumberland to London.
Eliza	Great Britain	The ship was wrecked near Boulogne, Pas-de-Calais, France. She was on a voyage from Savannah, Georgia, United States to London.
Florentina	Prussia	The ship was lost near Libava, Courland Governorate. She was on a voyage from Dublin, Ireland to Memel.
Foxhole	Great Britain	The schooner was destroyed by fire at Denbigh.
Friendship	Great Britain	The ship was driven ashore at Gibraltar. She was on a voyage from Gibraltar to Livorno.
Governor Milne	Great Britain	The ship ran aground on the Last Sand and was abandoned by her crew. She was later refloated and taken in to Whitstable, Kent. Governor Milne was on a voyage from London to Africa.
Harmony	United States	The ship was driven ashore and wrecked near Chichester, Sussex, Great Britain. She was on a voyage from Baltimore, Maryland to Hamburg.
Hippolytus	Great Britain	The ship sailed from Gibraltar. No further trace, presumed foundered with the loss of all hands.
Industry	Great Britain	The ship was lost at Porto, Portugal. She was on a voyage from Newfoundland to Porto.
Jupiter	Great Britain	War of the Second Coalition: The ship was captured and destroyed by the privateer La Revenge (France. She was on a voyage from Jamaica to Newcastle upon Tyne.
Maria	Great Britain	The ship was wrecked near Winterton-on-Sea, Norfolk with the loss of two of her crew. She was on a voyage from Danzig to London.
Mary	Great Britain	The ship was driven ashore at Gibraltar. She was on a voyage from Gibraltar to Naples, Kingdom of Sicily.
Minerva	Great Britain	The ship was driven ashore at Gibraltar. She was on a voyage from Gibraltar to London.
Newport	Great Britain	The ship was driven ashore on Saltholm, Denmark.
Orion	Great Britain	The ship foundered in The Swin. She was on a voyage from Saint Petersburg to London.
Providence	Great Britain	The ship was wrecked on Scroby Sands, Norfolk. Her crew were rescued. She was on a voyage from Saint Petersburg to London.
Riches	Great Britain	The ship was driven ashore at Gibraltar. She was on a voyage from Lisbon to Venice.
Robert	Great Britain	The ship was driven ashore at Gibraltar. She was on a voyage from London to Fiume, Hungary.
Somerset	Great Britain	War of the Second Coalition: The ship was captured and destroyed by the privateer La Revenge (France. She was on a voyage from Jamaica to London.
St Joseph	Great Britain	The ship was lost at Gibraltar. She was on a voyage from Gibraltar to London.
William	Great Britain	The ship was in collision with a Russian Man-of-War and sank at Sheerness, Kent.

== Unknown date ==
List of shipwrecks: Unknown date in 1799
Ship	State	Description
60 unnamed vessels	Flags unknown	The bidarkas were caught in a storm off Hinchinbrook Island on the south-central coast of Russian America. Two hundred men aboard the bidarkas lost their lives.
Albion	Great Britain	The ship was destroyed by fire at Jamaica.
Benjamin	Great Britain	The ship foundered in the Atlantic Ocean. Her crew were rescued by Suffolk (Great Britain). Benjamin was on a voyage from Martinique to Liverpool, Lancashire.
Cecilia	Great Britain	The ship was lost on the Hogsty Reef. Her crew were rescued. She was on a voyage from Jamaica to Liverpool.
Charlotte	Great Britain	The ship was destroyed by fire at Bengal, India.
Christian	Bremen	The ship was lost near Cape Lookout, North Carolina, United States. Her crew were rescued. She was on a voyage from Bremen to Baltimore, Maryland, United States.
HMS Deux Freres	(Kingdom of Great Britain) Royal Navy	War of the Second Coalition, Siege of Acre: The tartane was captured during the siege. She was commissioned into Royal Navy service but was lost in a gale.
Edwards	Great Britain	The ship was lost on the Cobler's Rock, off Barbados. She was on a voyage from Liverpool, Lancashire to the West Indies.
Eliza	United States	The ship foundered in the Atlantic Ocean. Her crew were rescued. She was on a voyage from New York to Saint Thomas, Virgin Islands and Jamaica.
Empress of Russia	Great Britain	The ship foundered in the Atlantic Ocean. Her crew were rescued. She was on a voyage from Jamaica to Virginia, United States.
HMS Fox	(Kingdom of Great Britain) Royal Navy	The schooner foundered in the Gulf of Mexico.
Friends	Great Britain	The ship was run down and sunk in the Grand Banks of Newfoundland.
Genius	United States	The privateer brig capsized and sank sometime after mid-February.
Hamburgh Ship	Flag unknown	The ship foundered at sea.
Hamilton	United States	The ship was lost on the Cancasus. She was on a voyage from Savannah, Georgia to Jamaica.
Hellen	Great Britain	The ship foundered in the Atlantic Ocean. She was on a voyage from Bristol, Gloucestershire to Newfoundland, British North America.
Henrietta	Great Britain	The ship sprang a leak and was abandoned by her crew in the Atlantic Ocean off the Grand Banks of Newfoundland.
Hibernia	Ireland	The ship was lost on the American coast. She was on a voyage from St. Ubes, Portugal to Baltimore, Maryland.
Hope	Great Britain	The ship was lost whilst on a voyage from New Brunswick, British North America to Jamaica.
Josiah Collins	United States	The ship went aground on the bar at Ocracoke Inlet.
Lightning	Great Britain	The ship foundered off "Cape Paderoon".
Maria	United States	The ship was lost whilst on a voyage from Philadelphia, Pennsylvania, to Charleston, South Carolina.
Mary	Great Britain	The ship was wrecked on the Cobler's Rock. She was on a voyage from Liverpool to the West Indies.
Mondona Calamiota	Ottoman Empire	The ship foundered whilst on a voyage from Constantinople to "Tagamock".
Pacific	United States	Quasi-War: The ship was captured by the privateer La Clarisse (France) in March. She was run ashore at Île de France, Mauritius to prevent recapture by British ships and wrecked. She was burned by the British the next day after being stripped.
Peggy	Great Britain	The ship foundered. Her crew were rescued. She was on a voyage from Dartmouth, Devon to Newfoundland.
Polly	Great Britain	The ship was driven ashore in New Brunswick. She was on a voyage from Greenock, Renfrewshire to Quebec City, Lower Canada, British North America.
Prince Edward	Great Britain	The whaler was lost on the coast of Brazil. She was on a voyage from South Georgia to London.
Queen Charlotte	Great Britain	The ship foundered whilst on a voyage from the Black River to Port Antonio, Jamaica.
Rebecca	Great Britain	War of the Second Coalition: The ship was captured and burnt in the Atlantic Ocean.
Regulator	(Kingdom of Great Britain) British North America	The ship was wrecked on Langley Island whilst on a voyage from Newfoundland to Sydney, Nova Scotia.
Richard	United States	The ship foundered in the Atlantic Ocean whilst on a voyage from Baltimore, Maryland to London, Great Britain.
Sally	Great Britain	The ship was driven ashore and wrecked at Smyrna, Ottoman Empire. She was on a voyage from Smyrna to London.
Seaflower	Great Britain	The ship was lost at George Town, Bahamas. She was on a voyage from Jamaica to Charleston, South Carolina.
Severnyi Orel	Russia	During a voyage in Russian America from Yakutat to Pavlovskaya Gavan (now Kodiak) carrying a cargo of furs, the schooner was blown onto rocks and wrecked in Prince William Sound with the loss of six crewmen.
Success	Great Britain	The ship foundered whilst on a voyage from Newfoundland to Portugal. Her crew were rescued by HMS Brilliant (Kingdom of Great Britain) Royal Navy.
Sussex	Great Britain	The ship was lost whilst on a voyage from Port Morant to Lucea, Jamaica.
Svyatoy Aleksandr	Russia	During a voyage from Russian Alaska to Okhotsk in the Russian Empire with a cargo of furs, the vessel was lost with all hands somewhere between Alaska and Siberia.
Tartar	Great Britain	The ship ran aground at Demerara and was declared a total loss. She was on a voyage from Demerara to London.
Trident	Great Britain	The ship foundered whilst on a voyage from London to Bermuda.
Turk	Great Britain	The ship foundered in the Grand Banks of Newfoundland. She was on a voyage from Bristol to Newfoundland.
Union	Great Britain	The ship foundered in the Atlantic Ocean. Her crew were rescued. She was on a voyage from Jamaica to London.
Venus	Great Britain	War of the Second Coalition: The ship was captured by the privateer Bournonville (France) and was subsequently lost. She was on a voyage from Newfoundland to Poole, Dorset.
Vigilant	United States	The private armed vessel was sunk by commissioned armed private vessel "Chesapeake" (United States).
West Indian	Great Britain	The ship was lost whilst on a voyage from Bristol to Antigua.
William	United States	The schooner foundered at sea sometime before mid-June.
