= HMS Nightingale (1702) =

History

England
- Name: HMS Nightingale
- Ordered: 4 August 1702
- Builder: Royal Dockyard, Chatham
- Launched: 16 December 1702
- Commissioned: 28 December 1702
- Out of service: 2 March 1724
- Renamed: Fox 16 January 1708
- Fate: Breaking completed January 1738
- Notes: Ship rebuilt at Deptford Dockyard 1727

General characteristics
- Type: 24-gun Sixth Rate
- Tons burthen: 251 40/94 bm
- Length: 93 ft 0 in (28.3 m) gundeck; 78 ft 9 in (24.0 m) keel for tonnage
- Beam: 24 ft 6 in (7.5 m) for tonnage
- Depth of hold: 10 ft 8 in (3.3 m)
- Sail plan: ship-rigged
- Armament: 20 × 6-pdrs on wooden trucks (UD); 4 × 3-pdr on wooden trucks (QD)

General characteristics As Rebuilt 1727
- Class & type: 20-gun, Sixth Rate
- Tons burthen: 37466/94 bm
- Length: 106 ft 0 in (32.31 m) gundeck; 87 ft 9 in (26.75 m) keel for tonnage
- Beam: 28 ft 4 in (8.64 m) maximum
- Depth of hold: 9 ft 2 in (2.79 m)
- Sail plan: ship-rigged
- Armament: 20 × 6-pdrs on upper deck

HMS Nightingale was a development of the standardize 20-gun sixth rates and were built at the beginning of the 18th Century. After she was captured by French privateer galleys in 1707 then recaptured four months later. She was renamed HMS Fox and continued service until she was rebuilt at Deptford. Her breaking was completed in January 1738.

Nightingale was the third named ship since it was used for a vessel captured in1626 and listed until 1628.

Fox was the sixth named vessel since it was used for a 22-gun French ship captured in 1650 and expended as a fireship in 1656 at Malaga.

== Construction ==
She was ordered on 4 August 1702 from Chatham Dockyard to be built under the guidance of their Master Shipwright, Robert Shortiss. She was launched on 16 December 1702.

== Commissioned service ==
She was commissioned on 28 December 1702 under the command of Commander Seth Jermy, RN for service in the North Sea. She was taken by six French privateer galleys off Harwich on 25 August 1707. She was commissioned into the French Navy as Le Rossignol. She was recaptured by HMS Ludlow Castle on 31 December 1707. She was renamed HMS Fox and recommissioned in January 1708 under Commander John Pepys, RN, in 1709 under Commander Ralph Saunderson, RN then 1710 under Commander George Colt, RN all for service in the North Sea. In 1712 Commander Edward Nurse, RN (promoted Captain in January 1713) for a voyage to Newfoundland then to Ireland in 1712. She underwent a large repair at Chatham at a cost of 1,339.34d (Note: A total cost accounting for inflation of approximately £237,700 in today's money.) between September and December 1713. She was paid off in December 1714. In 1715 she was under the command of Captain Hercules Baker, RN for service in the Mediterranean.

== Rebuild at Deptford 1727 ==
She was docked at Deptford for dismantling on 2 March 1727. She was ordered to be rebuilt as a 374 ton (builder's measure) 20 gun sixth rate under the guidance of the Deptford Master Shipwright, Robert Shortiss on 3 March 1727. She was relaunched on 18 November 1727. Her dimensions were now gundeck of 106 feet 0 inches (32.3 metres) with her keel 87 feet 9 inches (26.7 metres) reported for tonnage. Her breadth was 28 feet 4 inches (8.6 metres). Her depth of hold was 9 feet 2 inches (2.8 metres). Her builder's Measure tonnage was 37466/94 tons. She carried a standardize armament of twenty 6-pounders on the upper deck (UD). She was a full rigged ship. She was completed for sea on 28 December 1727 at a total cost of £6,426.4.8d (Note: A total cost accounting for inflation of approximately £1,002,000 in today's money.) for building.

== Commissioned Service after Rebuild ==
She was commissioned in September 1727 under the command of Captain Thomas Arnold, RN for service at South Carolina in the Americas. She returned home in 1730 then sailed back to South Carolina. She returned home and paid off on 10 August 1732. She recommissioned in 1733 under Captain Henry Reddish, RN for service at Barbados. She was ordered home and paid off on 11 August 1736. She underwent a survey on 1 February 1737.

== Disposition ==
Her breaking was completed at Deptford in January 1738.
