= HMS Fox Prize (1705) =

History

England
- Name: HMS Fox Prize
- Acquired: 19 May 1705
- Commissioned: 1705
- Fate: Wrecked 28 August 1706

General characteristics
- Type: 30-gun Sixth Rate
- Tons burthen: 273 bm
- Length: 76 ft 0 in (23.2 m) keel for tonnage
- Beam: 26 ft 0 in (7.9 m) for tonnage
- Armament: 20 × 6-pdr guns on wooden trucks (UD); 4 × 4-pdr guns on wooden trucks (QD)

HMS Fox Prize was a 24-gun French privateer, Le Behringhen taken by HMS Triton on 2 May 1705. She was purchased on 19 May 1705. She was commissioned into the Royal Navy in 1705 for service in Ireland. She was wrecked in Holyhead Bay in 1706.

Fox Prize (actually only listed as Fox) was the fifth named ship since it was used for a 22-gun French ship captured in 1650 and expended as a fireship at Malaga in 1656.

== Specifications ==
She was captured on 2 May and purchased on 19 May 1705. Her keel for tonnage calculation of 76 feet 0 inches (23.2 metres). Her breadth for tonnage was 26 feet 0 inches (7.9 metres). Her tonnage calculation was 273 tons. Her armament was twenty 6-pounders on the upper deck with and four 4-pounders on the quarterdeck all on wooden trucks.

== Commissioned service ==
She was commissioned in 1705 under the command of Commander Henry Roach, RN for service in Ireland.

== Disposition ==
She was wrecked in Holyhead Bay on 28 August 1706 with a great loss of life including her commander.
