= HMS Fox (1799) =

History

Great Britain
- Name: HMS Fox
- Acquired: 1799
- Fate: Wrecked 1799

General characteristics
- Tons burthen: 150 (bm)
- Sail plan: Schooner
- Armament: 14 guns

HMS Fox was a schooner that the Royal Navy purchased in 1799; she may have been a French prize. Lieutenant James Woolridge commissioned her in Jamaica.

Fox left Jamaica on 5 September 1799 to land General Bowles, the chief of the Creek Indians, on the Gulf of Mexico. Fox touched at the Isle of Providence on her way but was unable to get a pilot. On the 28th., while the master was taking soundings, she struck a reef off Dog Island, Apalachee Bay, Florida about 9 miles from the shore. The reef pierced the bottom, she filled rapidly with water, and fell over on her larboard side. The boats were all stove in so officers, crew, and General Bowles spent the night in the rigging expecting her to go to pieces at any moment. At daybreak they managed to get some casks of pork on to the reef and by noon they were all safe there when the schooner rolled over and broke up.

They were 32 days on the reef with only the pittance of pork and such water as they could dig out of the sand. On the thirty-third day they sighted a vessel that responded to their distress signals. She was the Jamaican privateer Providence, and she took all the survivors on board. She met HMS Thunderer in the Gulf and transferred to her all the rescued men. Thunderer landed them at Port Royal on 1 December. The subsequent court martial acquitted Woolridge, his officers, and men of all blame.
