= Rear admiral (Royal Navy) =

Flag officer rank of the Royal Navy

Rear-admiral
- Shoulder board and sleeve lace

- Distinguishing flag

- Motor car star plate
- Country: United Kingdom
- Service branch: Royal Navy
- Abbreviation: RAdm
- Rank group: Officers of flag rank
- Rank: Two-star rank
- NATO rank code: OF-7
- Next higher rank: Vice-admiral
- Next lower rank: Commodore
- Equivalent ranks: Major general (RM/British Army); Air vice marshal (RAF)

Rear admiral (RAdm) is a flag officer rank of the Royal Navy. It is immediately superior to commodore and is subordinate to vice admiral. It is a two-star rank and has a NATO ranking code of OF-7.

The equivalent rank in the British Army and Royal Marines is major-general; and in the Royal Air Force it is air vice-marshal.

== History ==
The rank originated in the 17th century, in the days of naval sailing squadrons when each naval squadron would be assigned an admiral as its head. The admiral would command from the centre vessel and direct the activities of the squadron.

The admiral would in turn be assisted by a vice admiral, who commanded the lead ships which would bear the brunt of a naval battle. In the rear of the naval squadron, a third admiral would command the remaining ships and, as this section of the squadron was considered to be in the least danger, the admiral in command of the rear would typically be the most junior of the squadron admirals. This has survived into the modern age, with the rank of rear admiral the most junior of the admiralty ranks of many navies.

Prior to 1864 the Royal Navy was divided into coloured squadrons which determined career path. The command flags flown by a rear-admiral changed a number of times during this period.

The Royal Navy rank of rear admiral should be distinguished from the office of Rear-Admiral of the United Kingdom, which is an Admiralty position usually held by a senior (and possibly retired) "full" admiral.

== Rank insignia and personal flag ==
Royal Navy rear admiral sleeve insignia

Royal Navy rear admiral shoulder board

Royal Navy rear admiral command flag, 1864–present

Royal Navy rear admiral shoulder board prior to 2001

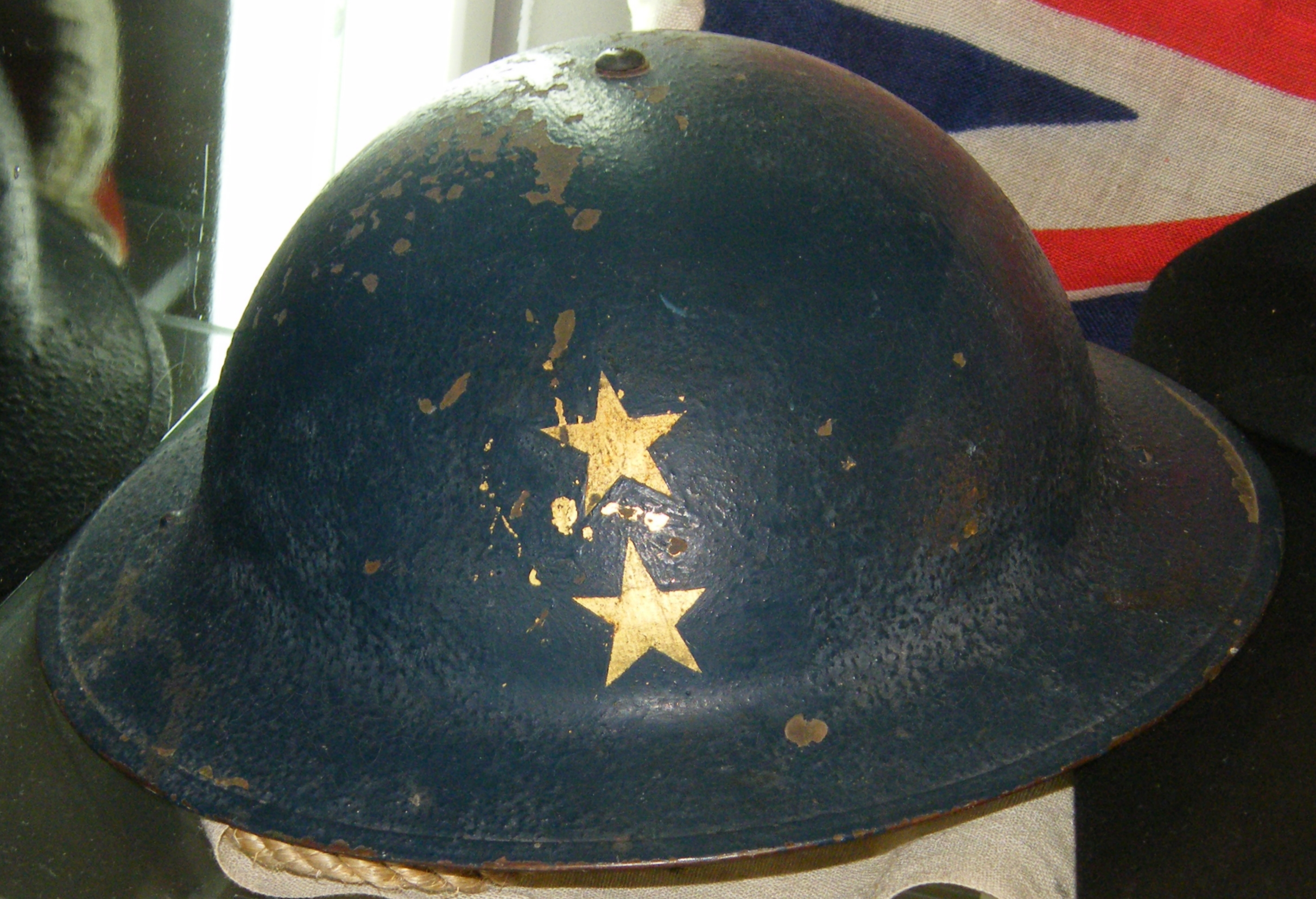
World War II Royal Navy rear admiral's steel helmet with two-star insignia

== See also ==
- British and U.S. military ranks compared
- Coloured squadrons of the Royal Navy
- Comparative military ranks
- Rear-Admiral of the Blue
- Rear-Admiral of the White
- Rear-Admiral of the Red
- Royal Navy officer rank insignia
- List of Royal Navy rear admirals
