= Coloured squadrons of the Royal Navy =

Former divisions of the British Royal Navy

Coloured squadrons of the Royal Navy were first introduced in the Tudor Period during the reign of Queen Elizabeth I of England (1558–1603). The purpose was to separate the English fleet into three squadrons for better command and control, though in 1596 there were four squadrons. In 1620, as the fleet was expanding, the system was changed to include three squadrons but also three sub-divisions. Assigned to each of these squadrons were flag officers who were separated in terms of their seniority by the use of coloured flags; in effect, the squadrons provided a system of designating the nine or ten most senior admirals of the Royal Navy until the system was abolished in 1864. Squadrons and divisions continued to be used as the system of managing large formations when the British navy consisted of more than one fleet for most of the twentieth century, until 1971.

== History ==
Historically, the English fleet was first divided into three squadrons distinguished by colour in 1558, the Admiral of the English fleet, the Lord Admiral of England's squadron, flew a plain red flag as its ensign. The Vice-Admiral of the fleet, or Vice-Admiral of England, flew a plain blue flag, and the Rear-Admiral of the fleet flew a plain white flag. The order of precedence until May 1596 was red; blue; and white.

In June 1596 the English fleet was divided into four squadrons for the expedition for the capture of Cádiz. The fleet during this expedition had joint commanders-in-chief styled as "Joint Generalls of the Armies by Sea and Land". Naval forces were under the command of the Lord Admiral of England, Charles Howard, 1st Earl of Nottingham, whose squadron was in the centre, whilst land forces were under the command of the General of the Army, Robert Devereux, 2nd Earl of Essex, whose squadron was also in the centre. The van squadron, or front, was commanded by the Vice Admiral of the Fleet (Vice-Admiral of England). The rear squadron (called the wyng) was commanded by the Rear-Admiral of the Fleet. After this expedition the system returned to a three squadron fleet.

In 1620 these squadrons had grown to the point where they could not be managed effectively by one admiral alone. This led to the introduction of a new system whereby squadrons were further subdivided into three subdivisions, each then led by three admirals of different ranks. Admiral was the senior rank, followed by Vice-Admiral and Rear-Admiral. In 1620 flag ranks were formally established in terms of promotion. From 1620 until 1652 the order of precedence of the squadrons was Red, Blue and White, until 1653, when the order of precedence was changed to red, white, and blue. In 1688 the permanent rank of Admiral of the Fleet was created, replacing the Lord High Admiral England operationally as commander-in-chief.

In 1805, after the Battle of Trafalgar, the rank of Admiral of the Red was introduced. It became the highest rank that an Admiral could attain until 1862, when an allowance was made for more than one Admiral of the Fleet to be appointed. In 1864 the colour squadron organisation was abolished and the Royal Navy adopted the White Ensign of the former White Squadron. The Red Ensign of the Red Squadron became the ensign of the British Merchant Navy, and the Blue Ensign of the Blue Squadron became the ensign of the Auxiliary Fleet.

== Squadron colours (1558–1596) ==
Included:

Flag of the English fleet 1545–1558

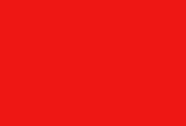
Flag of the Red Squadron (centre) 1558–1596

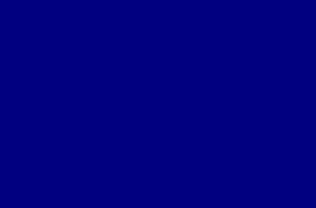
Flag of the Blue Squadron (van) 1558–1596

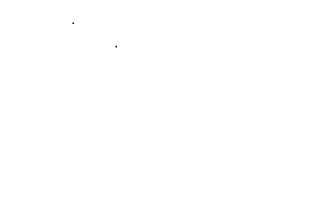
Flag of the White Squadron (rear) 1558–1596

== Squadron colours (1596) ==
During expedition to capture Cadiz with the aid of the Dutch (in 1 squadron) in June 1596 the English fleet was divided into four squadrons which had joint commanders in chief. Naval forces were commanded by the Lord Admiral whilst land forces were commander by the General of the Army each allocated corresponding flags to differentiate them as shown below.

=== Lord Admirals squadron (centre) ===
Included:

Flag of the Lord Admiral

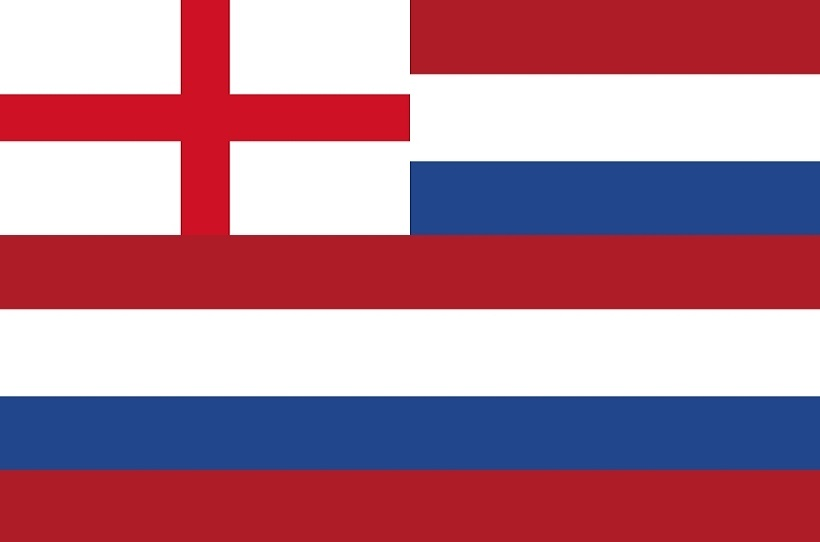
Flag of the Vice and Rear Admirals in this squadron

=== General of the Army's squadron (centre) ===
Included:

Flag of the General of the Army

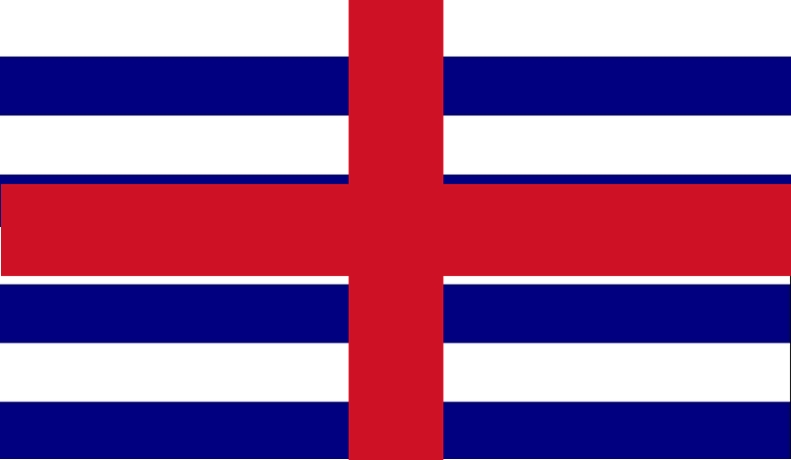
Flag of the Vice and Rear Admirals in this squadron

=== Vice-Admiral of England's squadron (van/front) ===
Included:

Flag of the Vice-Admiral of England

Flag of the Vice and Rear Admirals in this squadron

=== Rear-Admiral of the Fleet's squadron (wyng/rear) ===
Included:

Flag of the Vice-Admiral of England

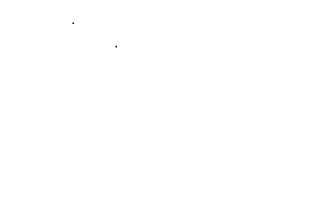
Flag of the Vice and Rear Admirals in this squadron

== Red squadron centre (1596-1864) ==
Included:

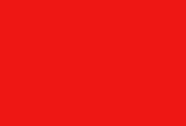
Flag of the Red Squadron 1558–1595, 1596–1603

Flag of the Red Squadron 1620–1707

Flag of the Red Squadron 1707–1800

Flag of the Red Squadron 1801–1864

The senior (red) squadron was usually placed in the centre of the line of battle, and always led by the commander-in-chief of the fleet, initially the Admiral of England, later called Lord Admiral until the creation of the rank of Admiral of the Fleet in 1688. During this period his van division was led by the Vice Admiral England (Red) and his rear division by the Rear Admiral of England (Red). From 1688 the Admiral of the Fleet's van division was led by the Vice Admiral of the Red and his rear division by the Rear Admiral of the Red. In 1805 the rank of Admiral of Red was created; the van and rear commands remained the same.

Flag officers in order of precedence
#	Flag officer	Notes
1	Lord Admiral of England	Commanded red squadron until 1688
2	Admiral of the Fleet	Commanded red squadron from 1688 to 1804
3	Admiral of the Red	Commanded red squadron from 1805 to 1864
6	Vice-Admiral of the Red	Second in command red squadron 1620–1864
9	Rear-Admiral of the Red	Third in command red squadron 1620–1864

== White squadron van/front (1596–1864) ==
Included:

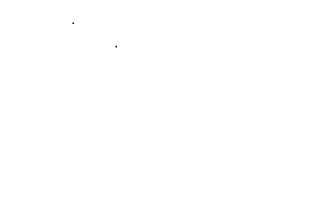
Flag of the White Squadron 1558–1595, 1596–1603

Flag of the White Squadron 1620–1702

Flag of the White Squadron 1702–1707

Flag of the White Squadron 1707–1800

Flag of the White Squadron 1801–1864

The white squadron, ranked second and generally placed in the van, would be commanded by the Admiral of the White, and its subdivisions would be led by a Vice Admiral of the White (van), and a Rear Admiral of the White (rear).

Flag officers in order of precedence
#	Flag officer	Notes
4	Admiral of the White	Commanded white squadron from 1620 to 1864
7	Vice-Admiral of the White	Second in command white squadron from 1620 to 1864
10	Rear-Admiral of the White	Third in command white squadron from 1620 to 1864

== Blue squadron wyng/rear (1596–1864) ==
Included:

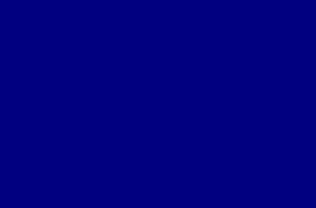
Flag of the Blue Squadron 1558–1596, 1596–1603

Flag of the Blue Squadron 1620–1707

Flag of the Blue Squadron 1707–1800

Flag of the Blue Squadron 1801–1864

The blue squadron, ranked third or junior, was similarly commanded with an Admiral, Vice Admiral and Rear Admiral of the Blue, each flying a blue ensign.

Flag officers in order of precedence
#	Flag officer	Notes
5	Admiral of the Blue	Commanded blue squadron from 1620 to 1864
8	Vice-Admiral of the Blue	Second in command blue squadron from 1620 to 1864
11	Rear-Admiral of the Blue	Third in command blue squadron from 1620 to 1864

== Flag officers and commodores promotion pathway within squadrons ==
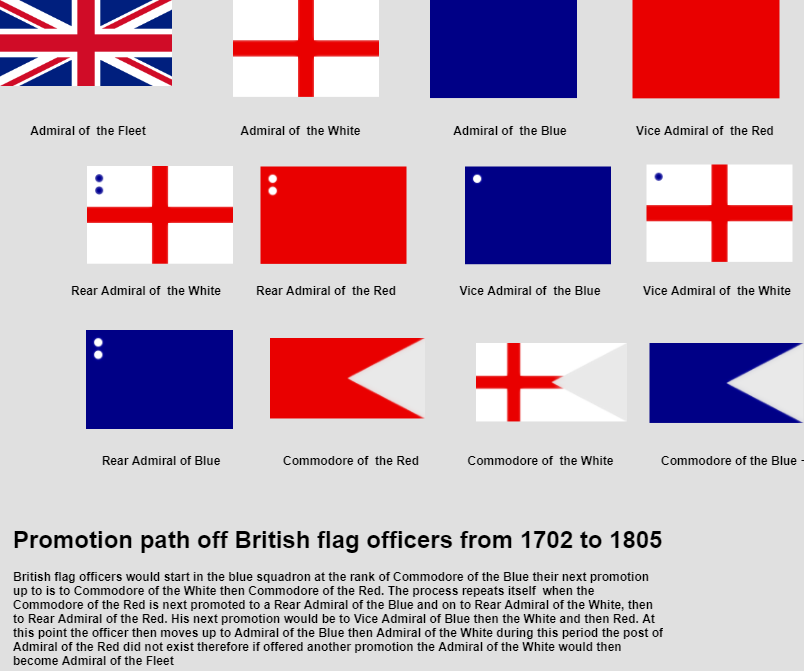
English then British flag officers promotion path from 1702 to 1805. Beginning with Commodore of the Blue through to Admiral of the Fleet the officers command flags are shown for the period

Promotion path of British flag officers from 1805 to 1864 the flags shown are the coloured squadrons naval ensigns

Promotion of Admirals also took place in this order - a Rear-Admiral of the Blue on promotion became a Rear-Admiral of the White as his first flag promotion. Once he had reached Rear-Admiral of the Red, on his next promotion he became a Vice-Admiral of the Blue and so on, until he finally became an Admiral of the White. It was only in the Red squadron that the hierarchy was not followed. There was no Admiral of the Red since this would be deemed as being in overall command of the whole fleet until the rank was introduced in 1805. Until 1862 there could only be one Admiral of the Fleet.

- Rear-Admiral of the Blue became Rear-Admiral of the White as his next promotion
- Rear-Admiral of the White became Rear-Admiral of the Red as his next promotion
- Rear-Admiral of the Red became Vice-Admiral of the Blue as his next promotion
- Vice-Admiral of the Blue became Vice-Admiral of the White as his next promotion
- Vice-Admiral of the White became Vice-Admiral of the Red as his next promotion
- Vice-Admiral of the Red became Admiral of the Blue as his next promotion
- Admiral of the Blue became Admiral of the White as his next promotion
- Admiral of the White became Admiral of the Fleet as his next promotion up to 1804, then Admiral of the Red as his next promotion (from 1805)
- Admiral of the Red became Admiral of the Fleet as his next promotion (from 1805 up to 1864)

== See also ==
- List of command flags of the Royal Navy

== Bibliography ==
1. Heathcote, T. A. (2002). British Admirals of the Fleet: 1734–1995. Barnsley, England: Pen and Sword. ISBN 9781473812703.
2. Information sheet no 55 Squadron Colours" (PDF). National Museum of the Royal Navy. 2014. Retrieved 26 February 2019.
3. "Naval Ranks". www.nmrn-portsmouth.org.uk. National Museum of the Royal Navy. 2015. Retrieved 26 February 2019.
4. Perrin, W. G. (William Gordon) (1922). "Flags of Command". British flags, their early history, and their development at sea; with an account of the origin of the flag as a national device. Cambridge, England: Cambridge : The University Press.
5. The National Archives:Trafalgar Ancestors, Glossary, Admiral. www.nationalarchives.gov.uk. Kew, London, England: The National Archives UK.
6. The Orders in Council for the Regulation of the Naval Service. (1864). London, England: Harrison and Sons.
7. Wragg, David (2012). "National Entries". The World Sea Power Guide. Barnsley, England: Pen and Sword. ISBN 9781783035588.
