= Commodore (Royal Navy) =

Senior officer rank of the Royal Navy

- Shoulder board and sleeve lace

- Distinguishing broad pennant

- Motor car star plate
- Country: United Kingdom
- Service branch: Royal Navy
- Abbreviation: Cdre
- Rank group: Senior officers
- Rank: One-star rank
- NATO rank code: OF-6
- Formation: 1674
- Next higher rank: Rear-admiral
- Next lower rank: Captain
- Equivalent ranks: Brigadier (RM/British Army); Air commodore (RAF)

Commodore (Cdre) is a rank of the Royal Navy above captain and below rear admiral. It has a NATO ranking code of OF-6. The rank is equivalent to brigadier in the British Army and the Royal Marines and to air commodore in the Royal Air Force. Commodore has been a substantive rank in the Royal Navy since only 1997. Until then the term denoted a functional position rather than a formal rank, being the title bestowed on the senior officer of a fleet of at least two naval vessels comprising an independent (usually ad hoc and short-term) command. (In this case, for instance, a lieutenant in substantive rank could be a commodore for the term of the command.)

== History ==
The rank of commodore was introduced in November 1674 (though not legally established until 1806). In 1684 the navy introduced two classes of commodore, the first known as a Commodore Distinction and the other a Commodore Ordinary; these would later evolve into commodores first and second class. In 1734 the title of commodore was formally approved by an order in council. They were formally separated into first class (those with subordinate line captains) and second class (those commanding ships themselves) in 1826. The previous broad red and blue pennants were abolished in 1864 along with the coloured squadrons, the commodore of the white's broad pennant with the Cross of St George remained as the command flag for commodores first class, who wore the same sleeve lace as rear admirals. The white broad pennant with a red ball was introduced as the command flag for commodores second class. The appointment of commodore first class has been in abeyance since 1958, leaving the pennant with a single red ball to cover all Royal Navy commodores.

Modern commodores wear the sleeve lace previously worn by commodores second class. Commodore has only been a substantive rank in the Royal Navy since 1997. Before then it continued to be an appointment conferred on senior captains holding certain positions. For example, the senior commander of destroyers within a fleet in the Royal Navy could carry the title of "Commodore (D)", while the fleet's senior commander of submarines could carry the title of "Commodore (S)", although in both cases as an appointment rather than a rank. During World War I the title of "Commodore (T)" was the officer who commanded torpedo boat flotillas.

== Promotion path ==
From 1570 to 1864 the Royal Navy was divided into coloured squadrons which determined an officer's career path.

== Rank insignia and personal flag ==
Commodore's command flag

Commodore's sleeve lace

A modern commodore's rank insignia consists of a 45-millimetre-wide band of gold lace, with a circle of 13-millimetre-wide lace 45 millimetres in diameter above.

== See also ==
- British and U.S. military ranks compared
- Air commodore
- Commodore-in-Chief
- Comparative military ranks
- Royal Navy officer rank insignia
- United States one-star rank
