= Admiral of the Red =

Rank of the navy of the United Kingdom

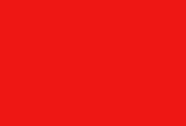
- Command flag (1805–1864)
- Country: United Kingdom
- Service branch: Royal Navy
- Abbreviation: AR
- Next higher rank: Admiral of the Fleet
- Next lower rank: Admiral of the White

Admiral of the Red was a senior rank of the Royal Navy of the United Kingdom, immediately outranked by the rank Admiral of the Fleet (see order of precedence below). The rank did not exist prior to 1805, as the admiral commanding the Red squadron was called Admiral of the Fleet. When the duties of Admiral of the Fleet were separated from Red squadron in 1805, the Admiral of the Red was created, and until 1864 this rank was the second highest rank in order of precedence. In 1864 it was abolished as a promotional rank (pictured opposite is the command flag for an Admiral of the Red).

== History ==
The Royal Navy inaugurated squadron colours during the reign of Elizabeth I (1558-1603) to subdivide the English fleet into three squadrons. There were three classes of admirals and differentiated by using coloured flags. In 1620 the official Flag ranks of Admiral, Vice Admiral, and Rear Admiral were legally established that arose directly out of the organisation of the fleet into three parts. The rank of Admiral of the Fleet was formally enacted in 1688.

The Admiral of the Red was a senior rank of the Royal Navy of the United Kingdom, immediately outranked by the rank Admiral of the Fleet (see order of precedence below). From 1805 to 1864 this rank was the second highest rank. In 1864 it was abolished as a promotional rank.

The rank was achieved by seniority among Admirals of the White. Today Royal Navy officers currently holding the ranks of commodore, rear admiral, vice admiral and admiral of the fleet are sometimes considered generically to be admirals.

== Order of precedence Admirals of the Colour ==
The Navy was divided into three squadrons: Red, White, and Blue, in order of seniority. Admirals were appointed to these squadrons and therefore their rank and squadron split the seniority into nine bands with ‘Admiral of the Fleet' forming a tenth senior to all others.

Seniority was therefore from 1805 to 1864:

1. Admiral of the Fleet
2. Admiral of the Red Squadron (rank created in 1805)
3. Admiral of the White Squadron
4. Admiral of the Blue Squadron
5. Vice-Admiral of the Red Squadron
6. Vice-Admiral of the White Squadron
7. Vice-Admiral of the Blue Squadron
8. Rear-Admiral of the Red Squadron
9. Rear-Admiral of the White Squadron
10. Rear-Admiral of the Blue Squadron

Seniority was therefore from 1688 to 1805:

1. Admiral of the Fleet (rank created in 1688)
2. Admiral of the White Squadron
3. Admiral of the Blue Squadron
4. Vice-Admiral of the Red Squadron
5. Vice-Admiral of the White Squadron
6. Vice-Admiral of the Blue Squadron
7. Rear-Admiral of the Red Squadron
8. Rear-Admiral of the White Squadron
9. Rear-Admiral of the Blue Squadron

Admirals without an appointment were colloquially referred to as Yellow Admirals. Ships of the Royal Navy flew the Ensign that coincided with the squadron of their commanding officer.

== See also ==
- List of command flags of the Royal Navy

== Sources ==
- Perrin, W. G. (William Gordon) (1922). "Flags of Command: Admirals Flags". British flags, their early history, and their development at sea; with an account of the origin of the flag as a national device. Cambridge, England: Cambridge : The University Press.
- Squadron Colours" (2014), (PDF). National Museum of the Royal Navy.
