= Distinguishing flags and broad pennants of the Royal Navy =

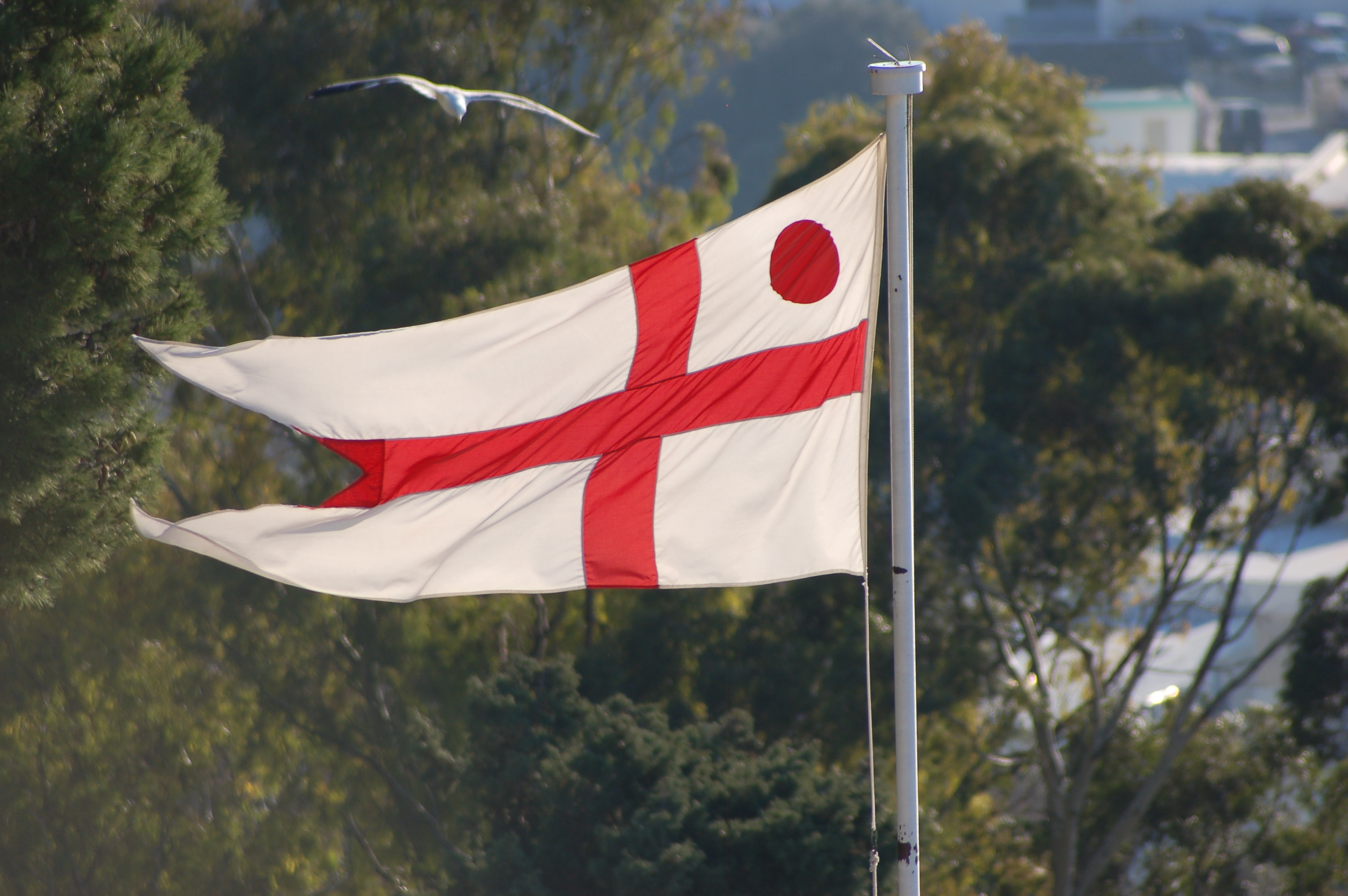
The broad pennant of a commodore, flying in Gibraltar

The distinguishing flags and broad pennants of the Royal Navy are flags flown from the ships and establishments of the Royal Navy to denote their commander.

Flags to denote the commander-in-chief of the English fleet and later Royal Navy were used from as early as 1189. Coloured squadrons of the Royal Navy were established during the Elizabethan era to subdivide the fleet into three squadrons or more. There were three classes of admirals and later a fourth that were differentiated by using coloured flags red, white and blue.

== Current distinguishing flags and broad pennants ==
When in command, flag officers (Note: When in a command appointment, these officers are known as 'flag officers'. When not in a command appointment, they are known as 'officers of flag rank'.) are to fly the distinguishing flag appropriate to their rank, whilst commodores in command are to fly a broad pennant. Officers entitled to fly such a flag afloat are also to fly their flag ashore at their headquarters or another designated location. Flag officers may hoist their flag whilst aboard any of His Majesty's Ships, whilst commodores may only fly their broad pennant aboard the ship to which they have been appointed.

Admirals of the fleet, former first sea lords and admirals who are or have been chief of the defence staff fly the Union Jack as their distinguishing flag whilst aboard one of His Majesty's Ships or establishments, even when not in a command appointment. The incumbent First Sea Lord flies the flag of an admiral, whilst the Second Sea Lord flies the flag appropriate to their rank.

Royal Navy distinguishing flags and broad pennants
| Admiral of the Fleet (Note: Admirals of the fleet; Former First Sea Lords; Admirals who are or have been Chief of the Defence Staff) | Admiral (Note: Admirals; The First Sea Lord) | Vice Admiral | Rear Admiral | Commodore |

General officers and brigadiers of the Royal Marines in a command appointment may fly a royal blue flag or pennant accorded to their rank when afloat in a small boat.

Royal Marines distinguishing flags and pennants
| Commandant-general | General or lieutenant-general | Major-general | Brigadier |

These officers of the Royal Navy and the Royal Marines may also fly a small car flag in a 2:3 ratio, sized 9 in × 6 in (230 mm × 150 mm), from the front of the bonnet of their car when on official duties and it is necessary for the car or its occupant to be recognised. The flag is not normally used on long journeys but may be hoisted when close to the destination. Officers below the rank of commodore and in command of a Royal Navy or Royal Marine training establishment may use the White Ensign as a car flag. Certain officers abroad, such as naval attachés, may also use the White Ensign as a car flag with the permission of the country's British ambassador or high commissioner.

When travelling in a small boat, officers who do not wish to receive full ceremonial honours may display a flag disc instead of a distinguishing flag.

== History ==
=== Origins ===
Arms of the Kingdom of England to 1198

Arms of the Kingdom of England to 1199–1340

Arms of the Kingdom of France

The earliest known usage of a command flag being used to denote the Commander-in-Chief of the English Fleet was during the reign of Richard I in 1189 that depicted a single gold lion on a red background. In 1198 it was changed to include three red lions against a red background which are still part of the royal coat arms of England till today. In January 1340 Edward III proclaimed himself King of France and adopted the arms of France then displaying (multiple fleur-de-lis or azure semi-of-fleur-de-lis) in the upper left and the lower right cantons with the arms of England in the upper right and lower left cantons to create a new Royal Standard. In 1411 Henry IV altered the French element of the standard to include just three fleur-de-lis.

In June 1340 Edward III commanded the English fleet at the Battle of Sluys where the king's standard was flown at top of the main masthead. This positioning of the only command flag used during that battle was later reserved for use by the monarch or his deputy commander the Lord Admiral. In 1495 Henry VII authorized the use of his standard during the expeditions of John Cabot. In 1530 Henry VIII instructed Sir Thomas Audley to create a set of instructions that made clear which command flags were to be flown on board ships and by whom (at this time a single command flag was to be used at the top of the masthead). Audley produced the book of instructions called the Book of Orders for the War by Sea and by Land. Between 1545 and 1547 Lord Lisle under instructions from the King altered Audley's instructions this time to denote three squadron commanders as follows.

The Lord Admiral shall fly the royal standard at the top of the main masthead and the flag of the cross of Saint George at the top of fore (front) masthead displaying two flags every ship in his squadron the captains were to fly a single Saint Georges flag at the top of the main masthead. The Admiral of the Van or (Vice-Admiral) of the front squadron flew two flags of Saint George one at the top of the main masthead centre and the other at the top of the front masthead. All captains of ships in his squadron fly a single cross of Saint George at the top of the fore masthead. The Admiral of the Wyng or (Rear-Admiral) of the rear squadron to display two flags of Saint George one at the top of the main masthead centre and the other at the top of the mizzenmast or rear mast head. All captains of ships in his squadron fly a single cross of Saint George at the top of the rear masthead.

From 1545, the Council of the Marine debated that it was necessary to identify which ship carried an admiral, and this achieved by flying the St. George Cross flag from the mizzen mast. When English fleets became larger, flags started to become used as signals of a squadron to which a particular ship belonged; this was initially done by flying a flag on either the foremast, or the mizzen mast or the top mast. The Royal Standards were used to identify which senior naval commander was on board. By 1588, only the royal arms, the national flags, and the squadron ensigns (by this time plain red, blue and white flags, for the first, second and third squadrons respectively) were used.

The Navy Royal inaugurated squadron colours during the reign of Elizabeth I (1558–1603) to subdivide the English fleet into three squadrons. There were three classes of admirals and differentiated by using coloured flags. In 1620 the official flag ranks of admiral, vice admiral, and rear admiral were legally established that arose directly out of the organisation of the fleet into three parts.

==== Royal Standard (1189–1627) ====
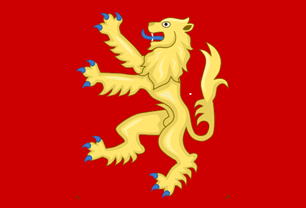
Command flag of Richard I as Commander in Chief English Fleet in 1189

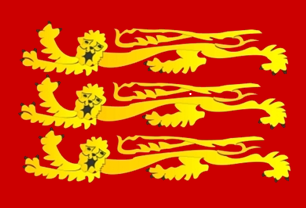
Command flag of monarchs of England as Commander in Chief English Fleet in 1199–1340

Royal Standard of England 1340–1411; it was also the command flag of the monarch or their deputy, the lord admiral, when on board ship at sea.

Royal Standard of England 1411–1553 and 1559–1603; it was also the command flag of the monarch or their deputy, the lord admiral, when on board ship at sea.

==== Admiralty flag (1588–1964) ====
Flag of the Lord High Admiral of the United Kingdom from 1922 and also called the Admiralty flag

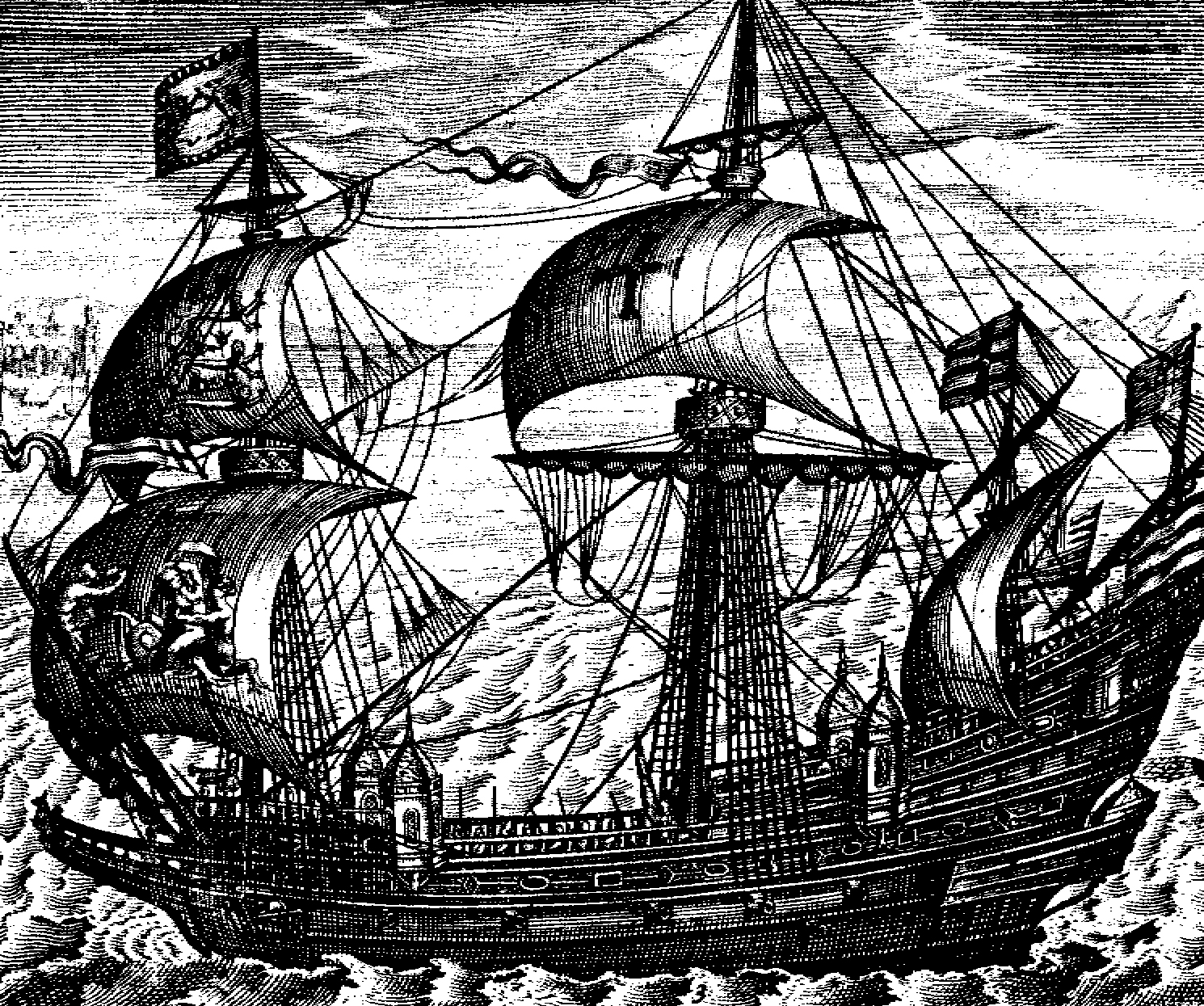
An image of the Ark Royal in (1587) by Claes Janszoon Visscher as Lord Admiral of England. His anchor flag can be seen at the top of the fore (front) mast. This flag evolved to become the admiralty flag

The Admiralty anchor flag first appears as a badge in the early 16th century that was mainly used for decorative purposes. The first time a specific flag was designed and flown was for the Lord Admiral of England Sir Lord Howard of Effingham on HMS Ark Royal as Commander-in-Chief of the English Fleet against the Spanish Armada in 1588. It would not be flown again until 1623 when the Lord Admiral the Duke of Buckingham was given an ensign depicting the admiralty anchor. However it was rarely used for as a command flag for naval operations instead it became the main flag to signify the Admiralty and Marine Affairs Office.

==== Lord Admiral's command flags (1545–1558) ====
Included:

First command Flag of the Lord Admiral of England under Henry VIII, Edward VI (1545–1553) when on board a ship

Second command Flag of the Lord Admiral of England (1547–1553) when on board a ship

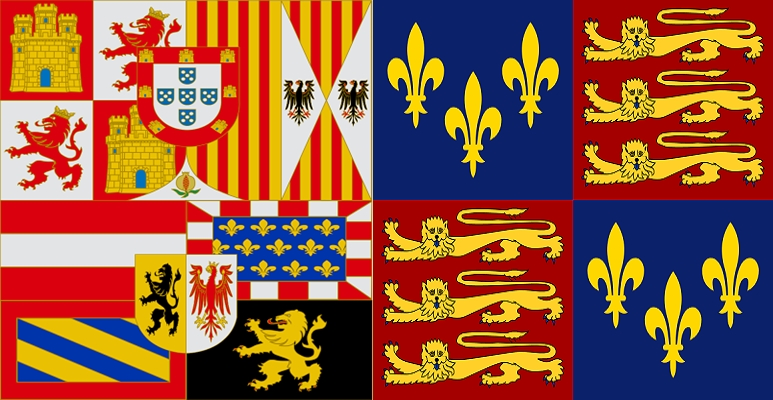
First command Flag of the Lord Admiral of England (1554–1558) under Mary I and Philip II when on board a ship

Second command Flag of the Lord Admiral of England (1554–1558) when on board a ship

==== Lord Admiral's command flags (1559–1625) ====
Included:

First command Flag of the Lord Admiral of England under Elizabeth I (1559–1596) when on board a ship

Second command Flag of the Lord Admiral of England (1545–1596) when on board a ship

First command Flag of the Lord Admiral of England (1603–1625) under James VI and I when on board a ship

Second command Flag of the Lord Admiral of England (1545–1625) when on board a ship

==== Vice and Rear Admiral's of England command flags (1545–1596) ====
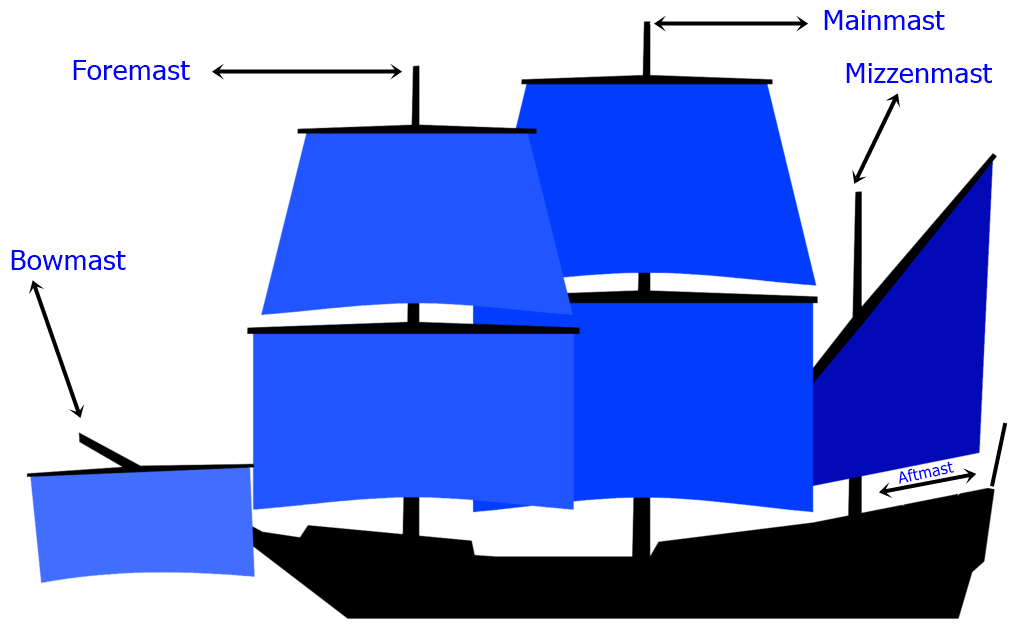
Diagram of mast names on a sailing ship

Included:

Vice Admiral of England command flag (1545–1596) when on board a ship

Rear Admiral of England command flag (1545–1596) when on board a ship
- Note:The Vice Admiral flies two flags of St George flown at the top of the main centre mast head the other at the top of the fore mast head.
- Note:The Rear Admiral flies two flags of St George flown at the top of the main centre mast head the other at the top of the mizzen (rear) mast head.

==== Captain's command flag in the Lord Admiral's Squadron (1545–1596) ====
Included:

Captain's command flag in the Lord Admiral's squadron(1545–1596) when on board a ship
- Note: A captain's ship in the Lord Admiral's centre squadron has the flag of St George flown at the top of the main centre masthead.
- Note: A captain's ship in the Van squadron (front) has the flag of St George flown at the top of the main fore masthead.
- Note: A captain's ship in the Wyng squadron (rear) has the flag of St George flown at the top of the mizzen masthead.

==== Illustration of squadron's flagships and captain's ships depicting position of command flags (1545–1596) ====
Included: Lord Admiral's squadron

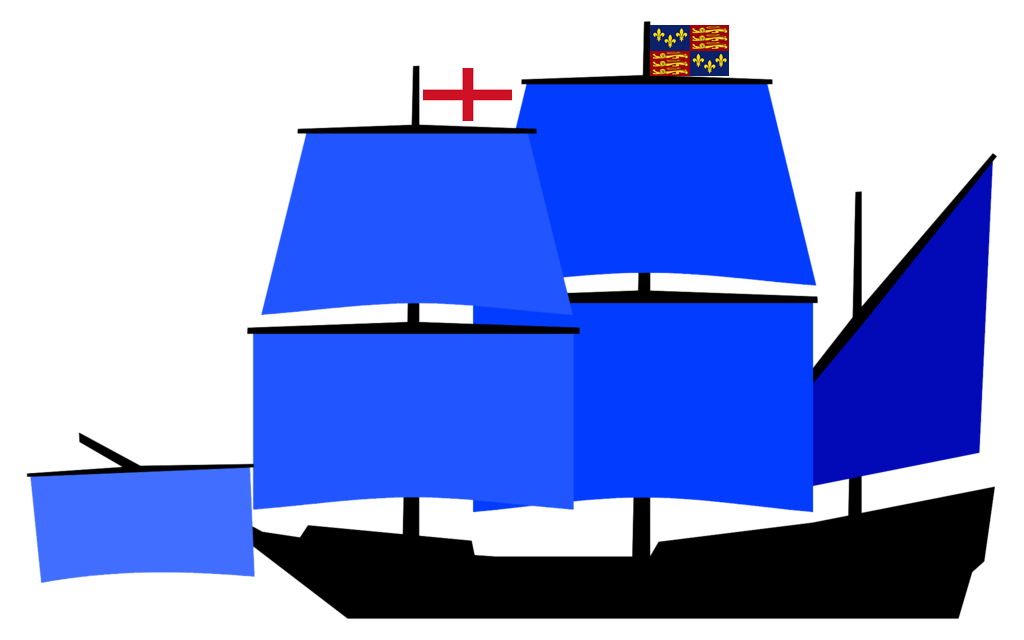
Position of command flags on Lord Admiral's flagship (1545–1596)

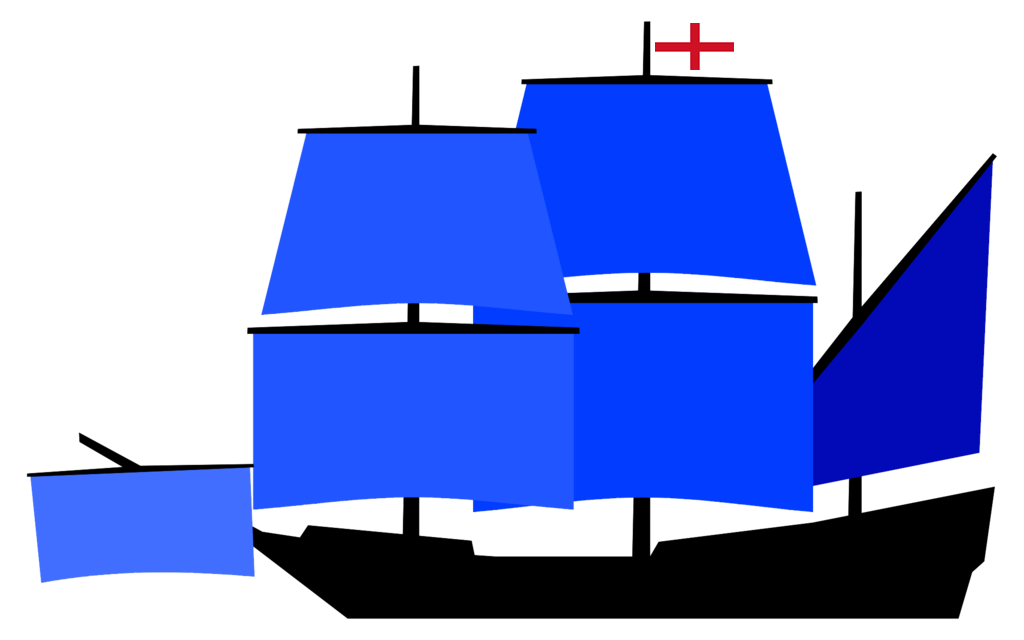
Position of captain's flag on ship in Lord Admiral's squadron (1545–1596)

Vice Admiral's squadron

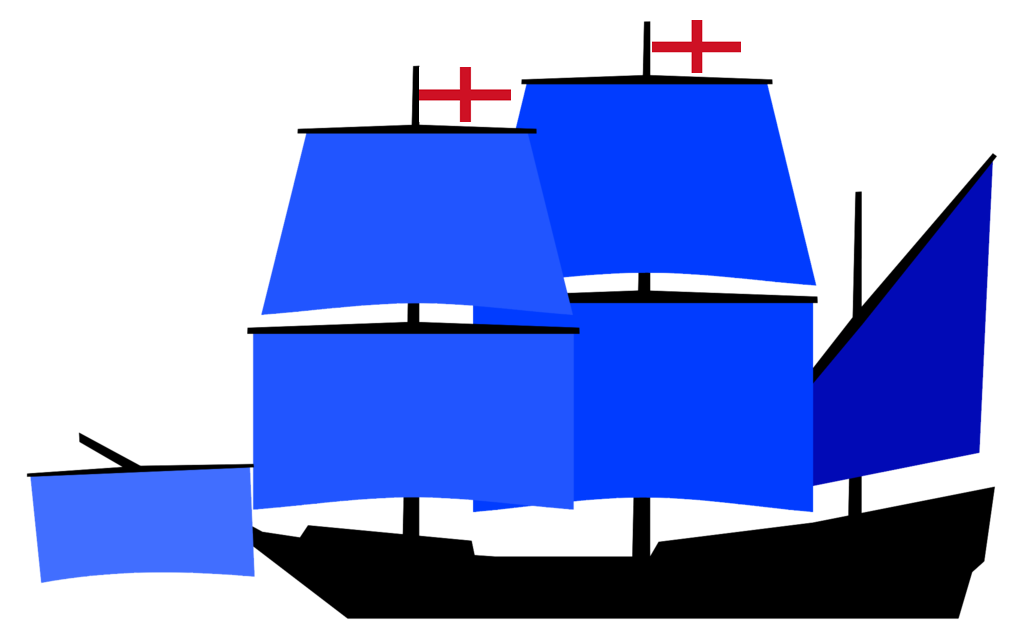
Position of command flags on Vice Admiral's flagship (1545–1596)

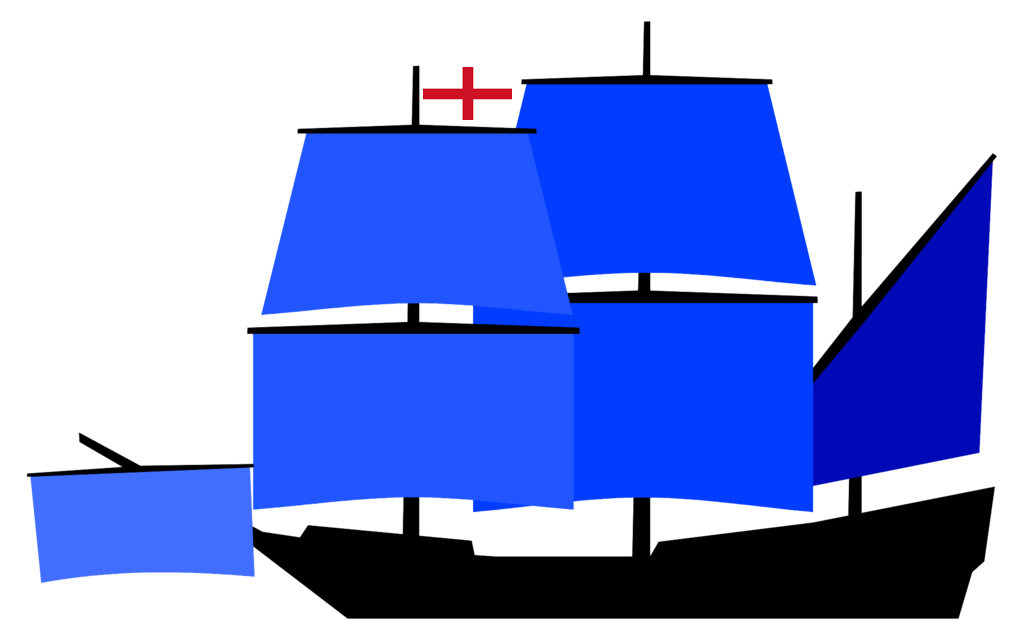
Position of Captain's flag on ship in Vice Admiral's squadron (1545–1596)

Rear Admiral's squadron

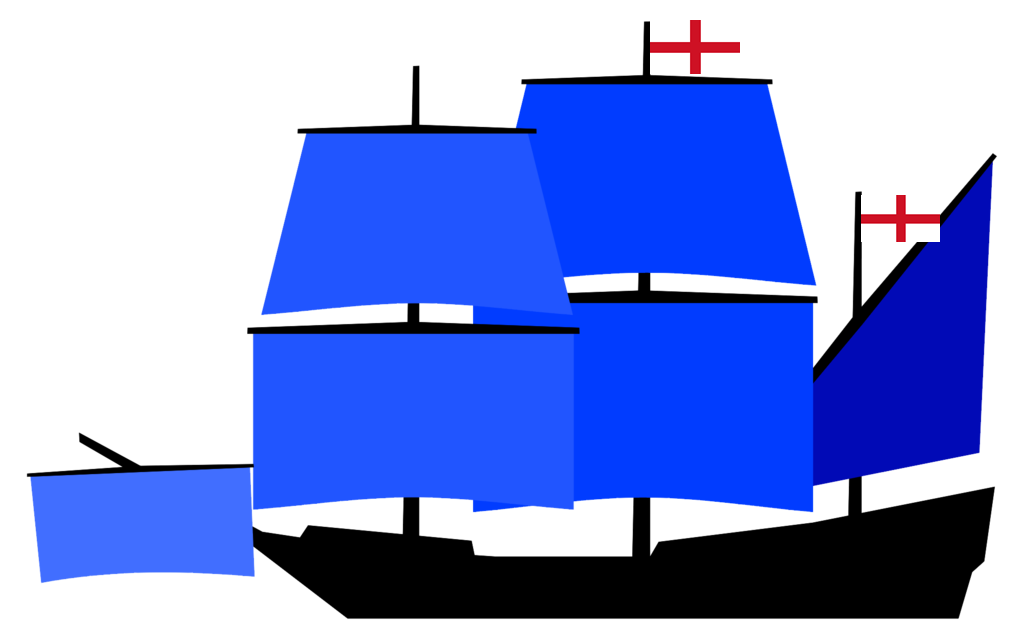
Position of command flags on Rear Admiral's flagship (1545–1596)

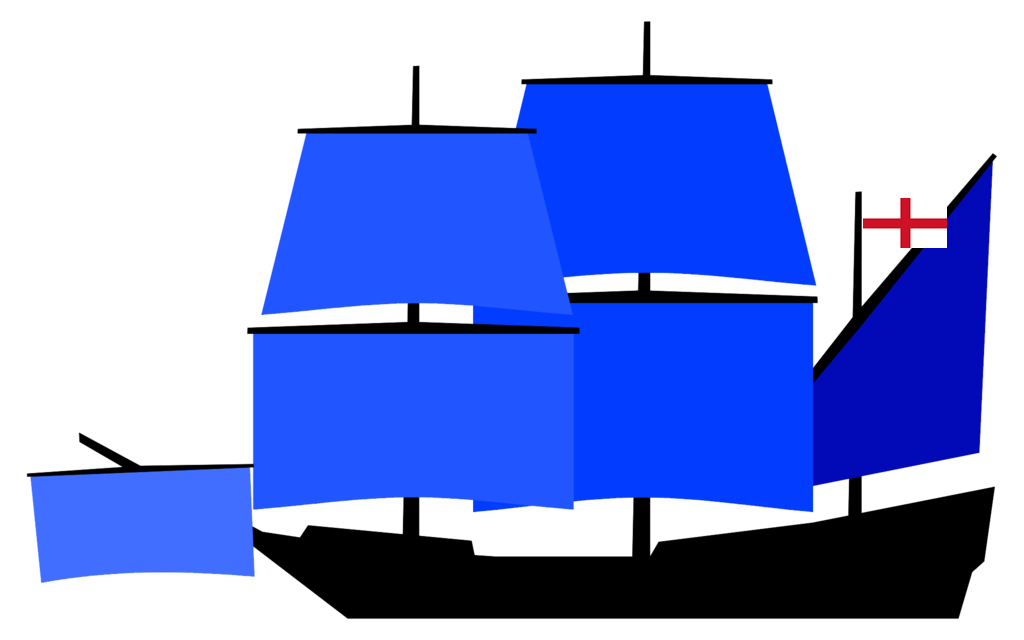
Position of Captain's flag on ship in Rear Admiral's squadron (1545–1596)

==== Squadron Admiral's command flags (1558–1596) ====
Command flags for other Vice or Rear Admirals that were not an Admiral, a Vice Admiral or a Rear Admiral of the Fleet (England)

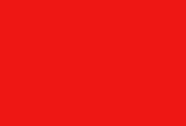
Vice and Rear Admiral's Red Squadron Kingdom of England

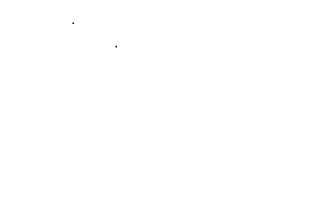
Vice and Rear Admiral's White Squadron Kingdom of England

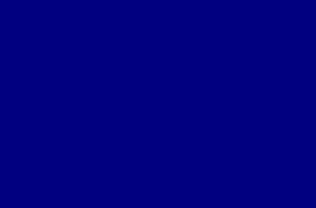
Vice and Rear Admiral's Blue Squadron Kingdom of England

==== Lord Admiral's and General of the Army's command flags (1596) ====
Included:

Lord Admiral

First command Flag of the Lord Admiral of England under Elizabeth I (1596) when on board a ship

Second command Flag of the Lord Admiral of England (1596) when on board a ship

==== General of the Army's command flag (1596) ====
Included:

Flag of the General of the Army's (1596) when on board a ship

In 1596 the expedition for Capture of Cádiz during the Anglo-Spanish War was led by joint commanders styled as "Generalls of the Armies by land and sea", Robert Devereux, 2nd Earl of Essex in command of land forces and Charles Howard, 1st Earl of Nottingham in command of naval forces, the English fleet consisted of four squadrons. Their immediate subordinates were Thomas Howard, 1st Earl of Suffolk as Vice Admiral of the Fleet and Sir Walter Raleigh as Rear Admiral of the Fleet. They both commanded a squadron and had a vice admiral (second-in-command) and rear admiral (third-in-command) subordinate to them. The command flags issued for that expedition are described as following.

The Lord Admiral flies the royal standard at the main masthead and the flag of the cross of Saint George at the fore (front). The Vice Admiral and Rear Admiral in the Lord Admiral's squadron fly at the front and rear mastheads a red, white and blue seven stripped horizontal flag with the cross of saint George in the upper left canton. The Earl of Essex flies only a single flag of the cross of saint George at the main, the Vice and Rear admiral in his squadron fly a saint George flag barred with blue stripes horizontal. The Vice Admiral of the Fleet to fly a green and white striped flag with the cross of saint George in the upper left canton main mast head and flag of saint George front mast head. The Vice and Rear Admirals in his squadron flew the same flags in their respective positions (proper masthead). The Rear Admiral of the Fleet to fly a green and white striped flag with the cross of saint George in the upper left canton main mast head and flag of saint George rear mast head. The Vice and Rear Admirals in his squadron flew plain white flags in their respective positions (main and front) and (main and Rear) mastheads.

Note: Originally discussions that took place before fleet was sent to Cadiz considered four colours to identify each squadron they were a plain flag tawny orange (orange squadron), a plain crimson flag (red) (crimson squadron), a plain blue flag (blue squadron) and a plain white flag (white squadron).

==== Vice and Rear Admirals' command flags in the Lord Admiral's squadron (1596) ====
Included:

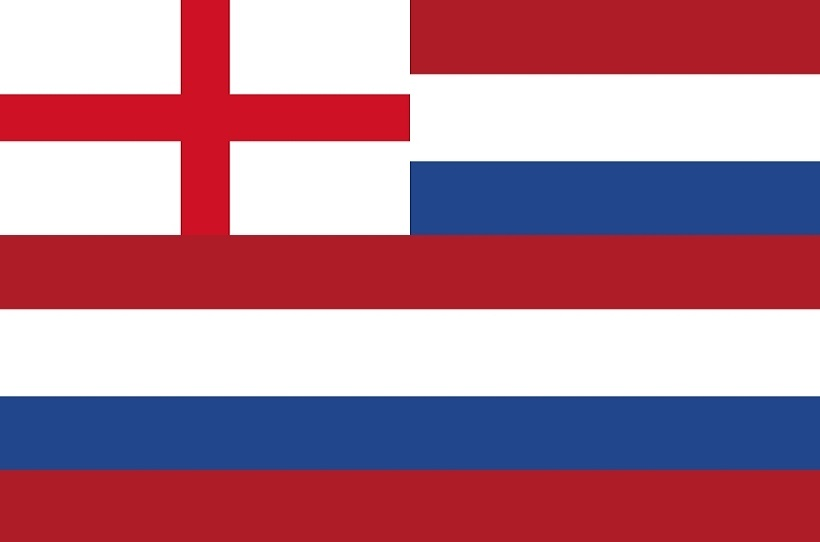
Vice Admiral's and Rear Admiral's of the Lord Admiral's squadron first command flag (1596) are flown in their respective positions on the masthead.

Vice Admiral's and Rear Admiral's of the Lord Admiral's squadron second command flag (1596) are flown in their respective positions on the masthead.

==== Vice and Rear Admirals' command flags in the General of the Army's (1596) ====
Included:

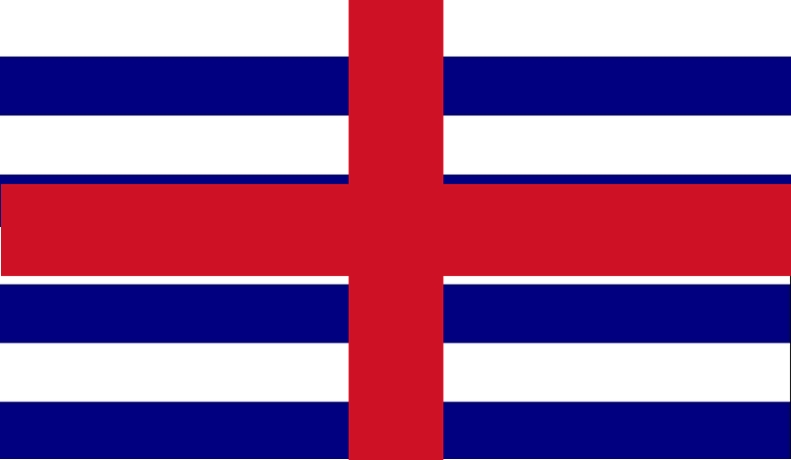
Vice and Rear Admirals' command flags in the General of the Army's squadron to Cadiz (1596) are flown in their respective positions.

==== Vice Admiral's and Rear Admiral's of the Fleet command flags (1596) ====
Included:

Vice Admiral's and Rear Admiral's of the Fleet first command flag (1596) that is flown in its respective position on the relevant masthead

Vice Admiral's and Rear Admiral's of the Fleet second command flag (1596) that is flown in its respective position on the relevant masthead

==== Vice and Rear Admirals' command flags in the Rear Admiral's of the fleet squadrons (1596) ====
Included:

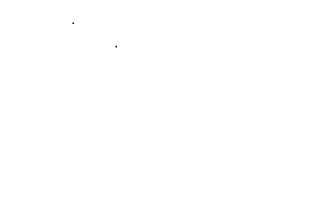
Vice Admirals in the Rear Admirals of Fleet squadron fly two plain white flags in their respective positions (1596).

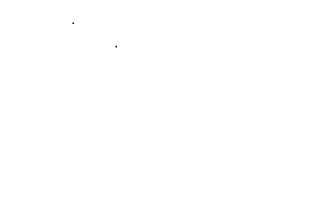
Rear Admirals in the Rear Admirals of the Fleet squadron fly two plain white flags in their respective positions (1596).

==== Illustration of squadrons flagships depicting position of command flags (1596) ====
Included: Lord Admiral's squadron

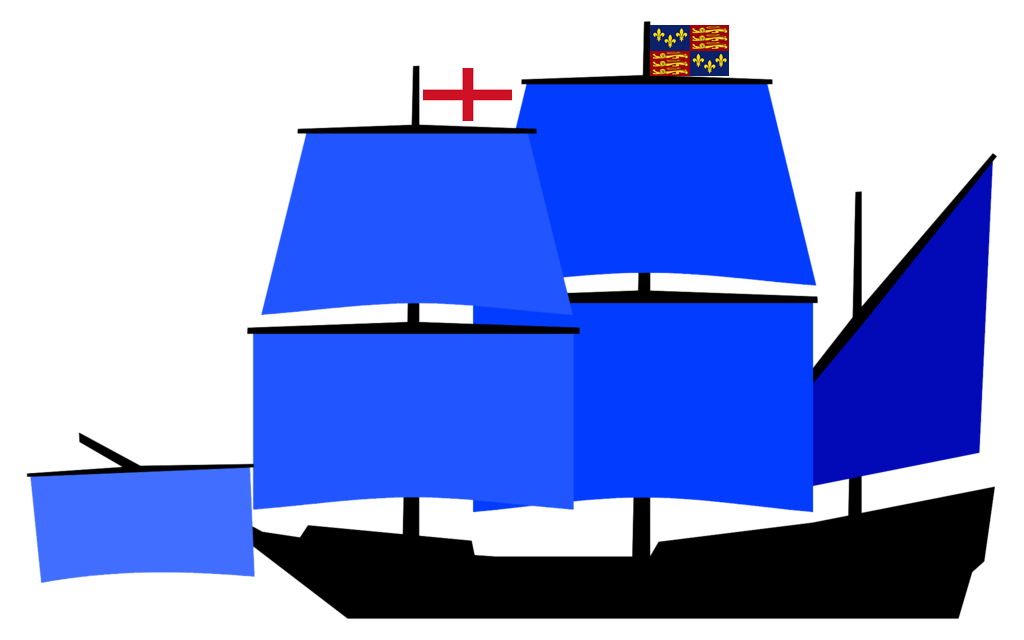
Position of command flags on Lord Admiral's flagship (1596)

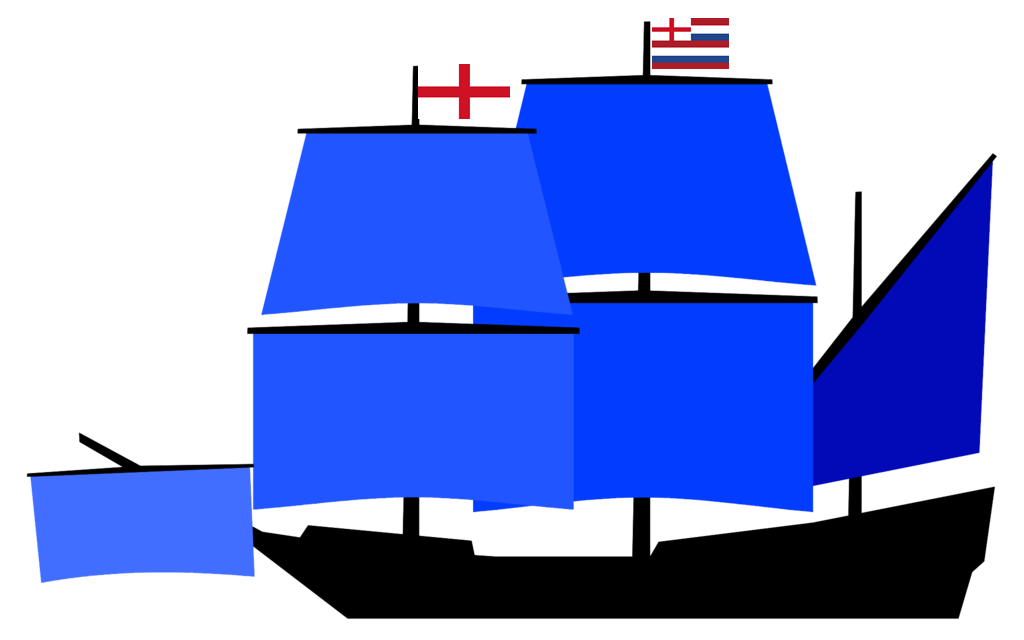
Position of command flags of Vice Admiral's flagship of Lord Admiral's Squadron English Navy (1596)

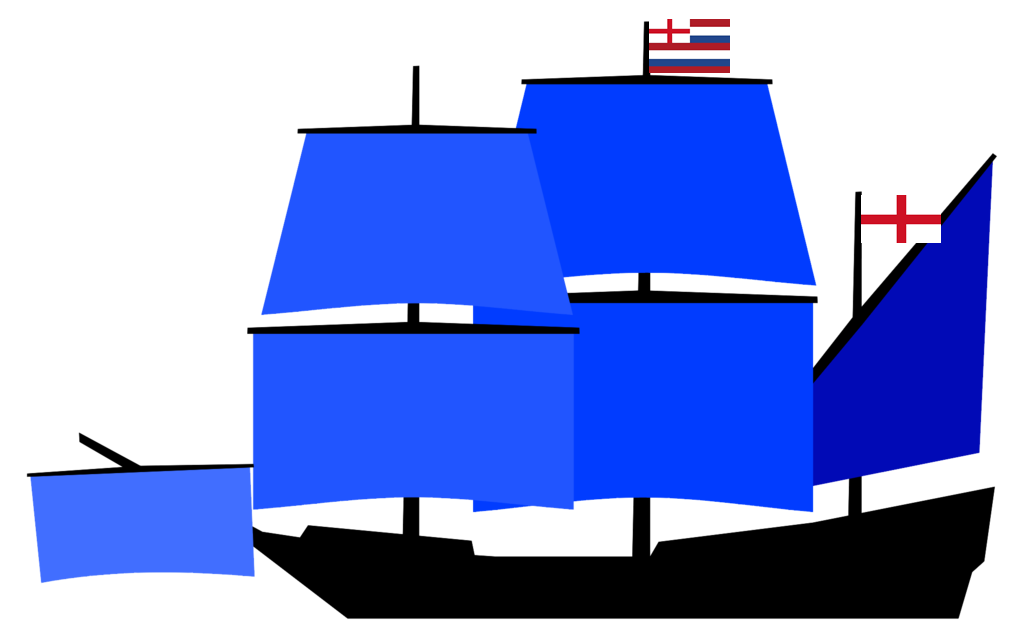
Position of command flags of Rear Admiral's flagship of Lord Admiral's Squadron English Navy (1596)

General of the Army's squadron

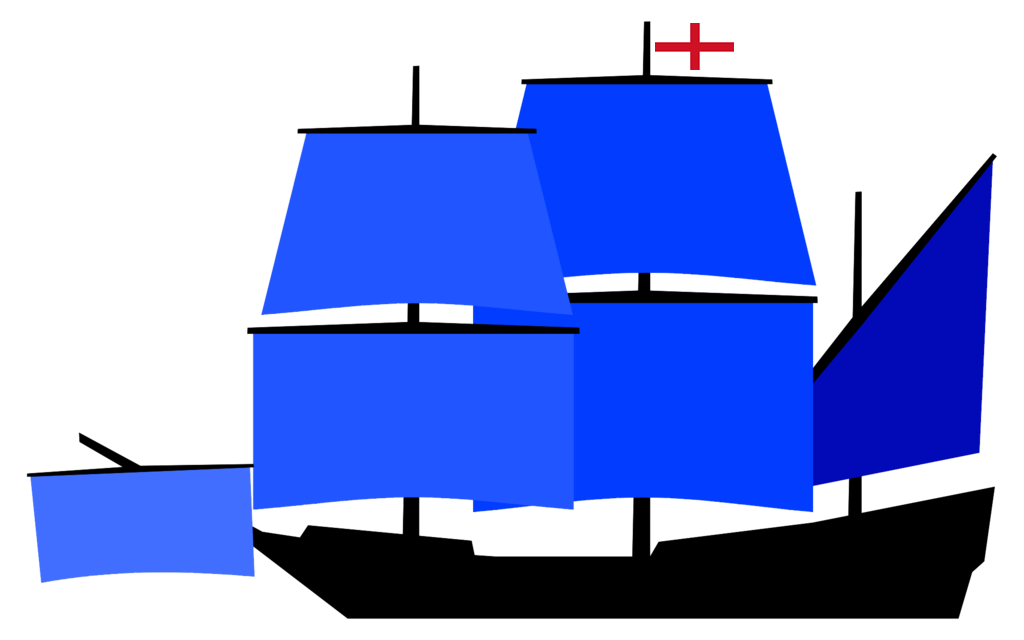
Position of command flags on General of the Army's flagship (1596)

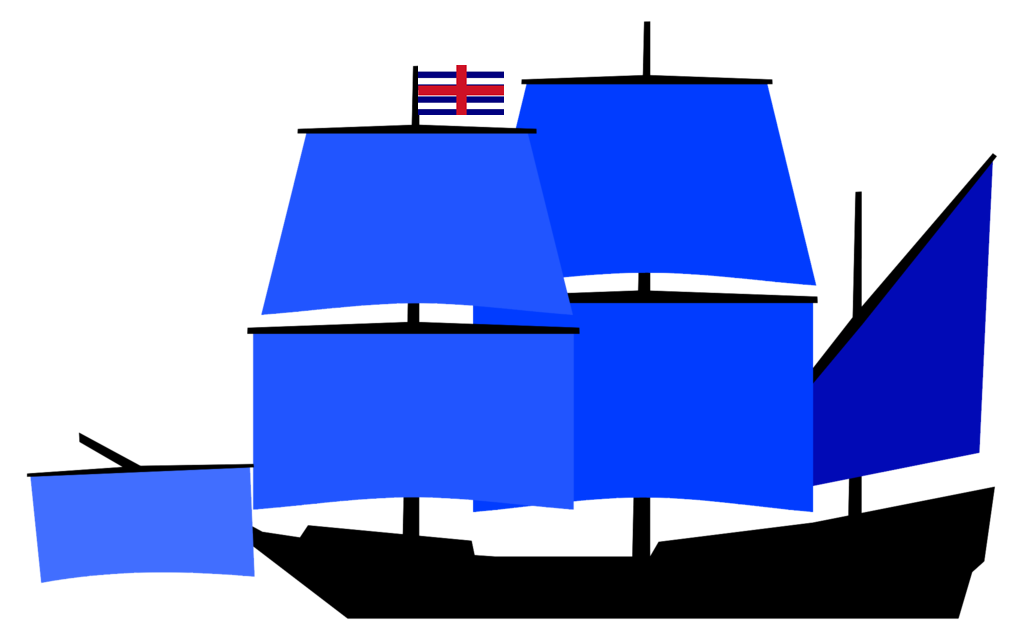
Position of command flag of Vice Admiral's flagship of General of the Army's squadron English Navy (1596)

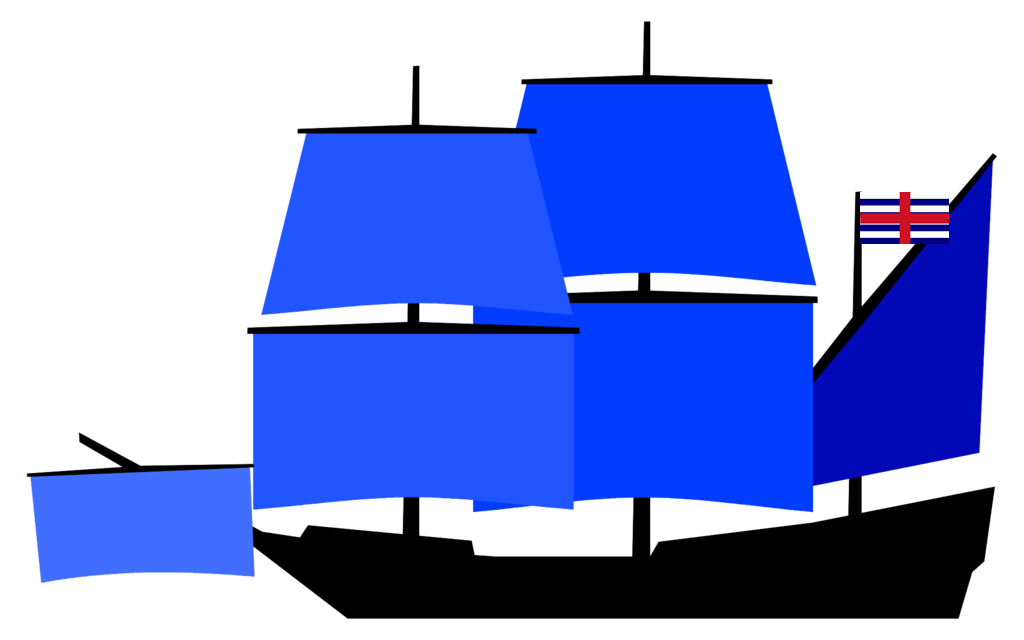
Position of command flag of Rear Admiral's flagship of General of the Army's English Navy (1596)

Vice Admiral's of the Fleet squadron

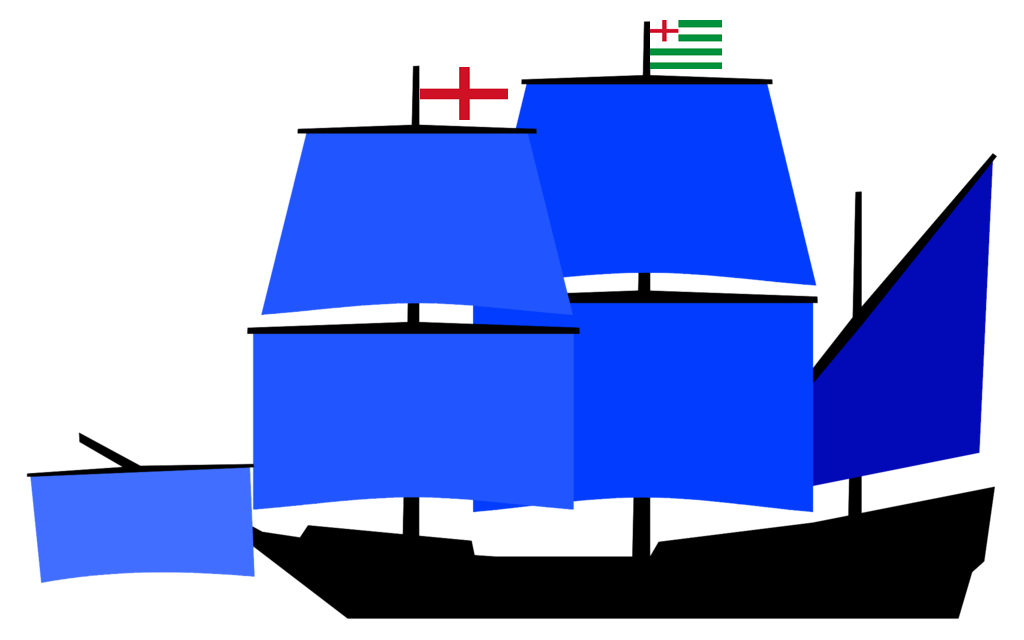
Vice Admiral's of the Fleet flagship English Navy (1596) and position of his command flags

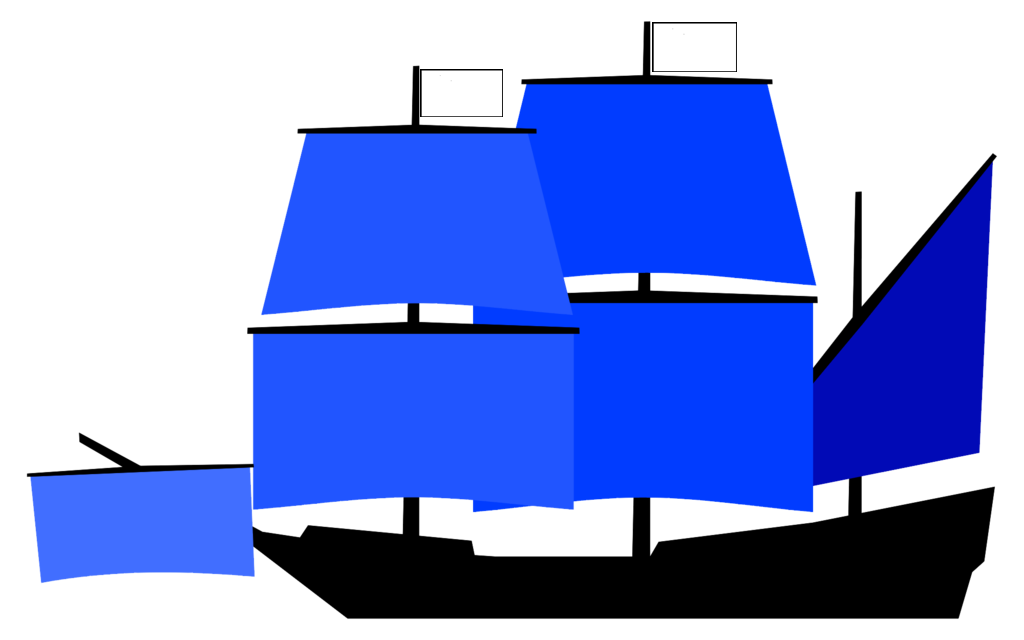
Vice Admiral's flagship in the Vice Admiral's of the Fleet Squadron English Navy (1596) and position of his command flags

Rear Admiral's of the Fleet squadron

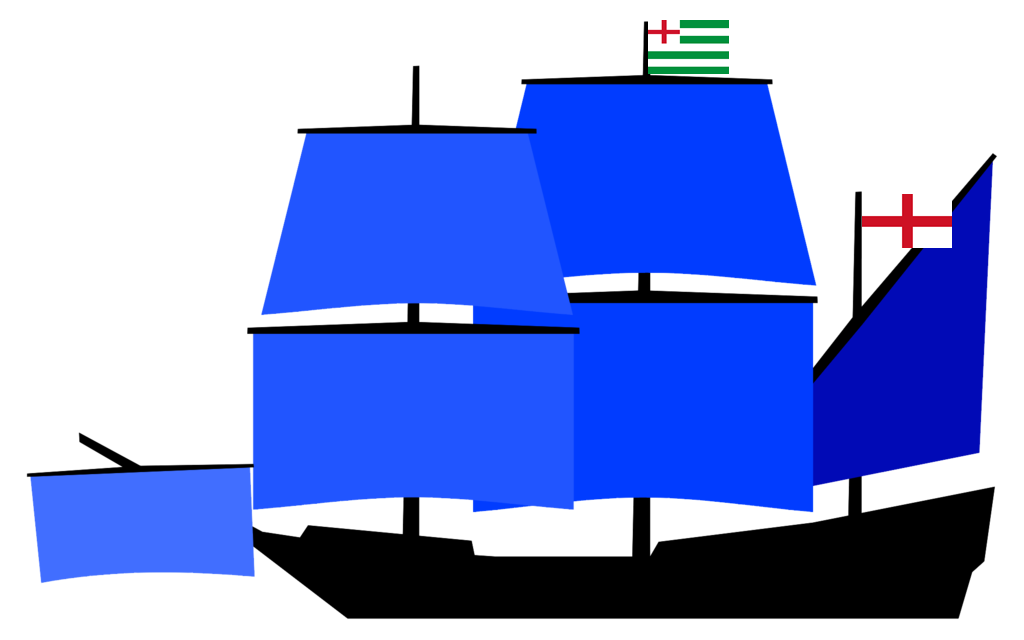
Rear Admiral's of the Fleet flagship English Navy (1596) and position of his command flags

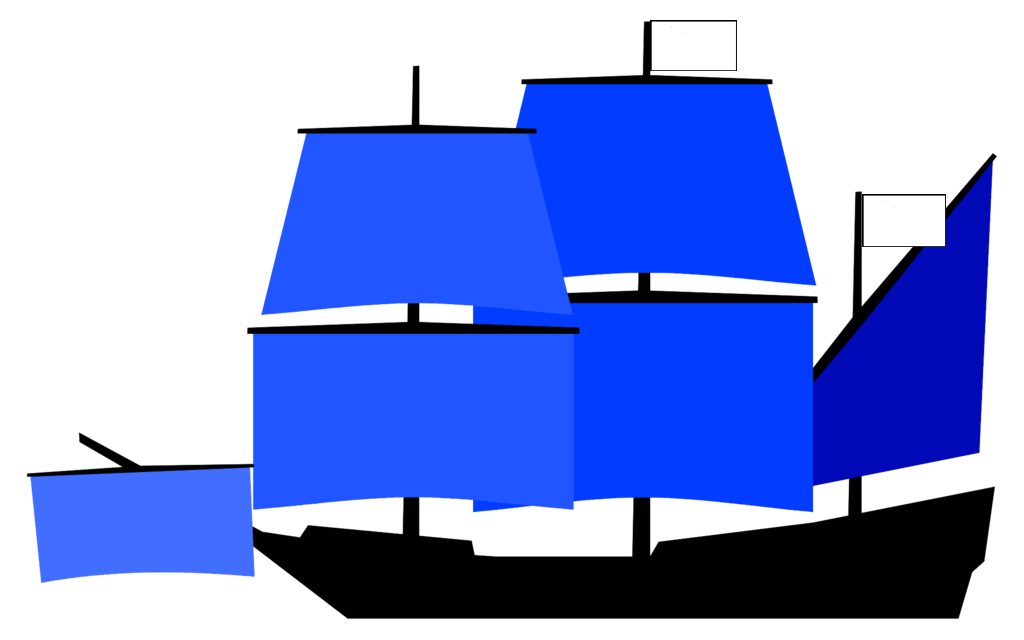
Rear Admiral's Flagship in the Rear Admiral's of the Fleet Squadron English Navy (1596) and position of his command flags

==== Admirals command flags expedition to Cadiz (1625) ====
Included:

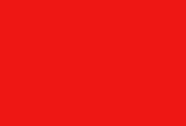
The Admiral's flag commanding red squadron for the expedition to Cadiz in (1625)

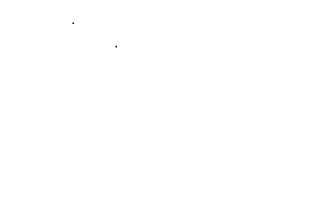
The Admiral's command flag commanding white squadron for the expedition to Cadiz in (1625)

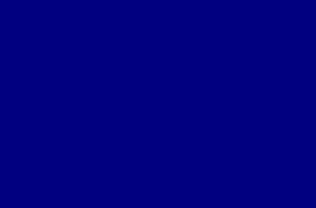
The Admiral's command flag commanding blue squadron for the expedition to Cadiz in (1625)

In 1625, there was a second Cádiz expedition in which the English fleet was divided into three coloured squadrons each commanded by an admiral of the red, white and blue. Perrin (1922) does note indicate what flag rank these officers were suffice to say there was no admiral of the red in existence until 1805 so we must assume they were vice admirals.

==== Admirals command flags expedition to attack Cadiz October (1625) ====
Included:

Admiral of the Fleet and Commander-in-Chief's squadron

Admiral and C-in-C attack on Cadiz in October/November (1625) was instructed to fly this command flag at the main mast though he was not Lord Admiral.

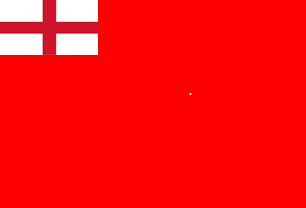
Vice Admiral's command flag in the commander in chief's squadron for the expedition to Cadiz in (1625) flown at the top of the main mast

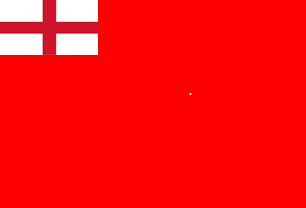
Rear Admiral's command flag in the commander in chief's squadron for the expedition to Cadiz in (1625) flown at the top of the main mast

Vice Admiral of the Fleets squadron

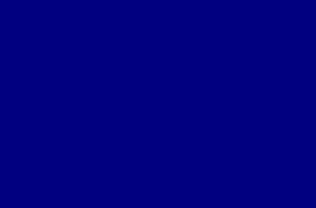
Plain blue command flag at the main mast

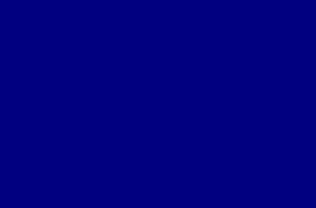
Vice and Rear Admirals in this squadron fly the same flag but at the fore and mizzen masts positions.

Rear Admiral of the Fleets squadron

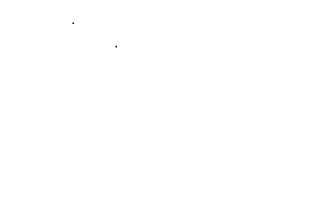
Plain white command flag at the main mast

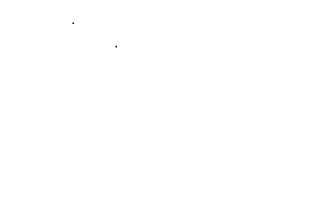
Vice and Rear Admirals in this squadron fly the same flag but at the fore and mizzen masts positions.

==== Admirals command flags at the Siege of Saint-Martin-de-Ré in (1627) ====
Included:

Admiral of the Fleet and Commander-in-Chief's squadron

Admiral and C-in-C attack on Cadiz in October/November (1625) was instructed to fly the royal standard as his command flag at the main mast though he was not Lord Admiral.

Vice Admiral of the Fleets squadron

Vice Admiral of the Fleet to fly Union Flag at the fore mast

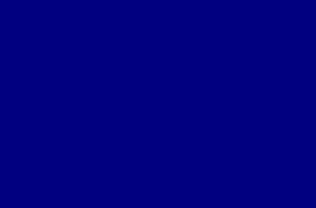
He also flew a plain blue command flag at the main mast.

Rear Admiral of the Fleets squadron

Vice Admiral of the Fleet to fly Union Flag at the mizzen or rear mast

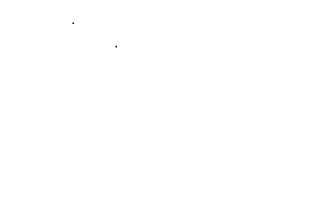
He also flew a plain white command flag at the main mast.

Additional squadrons in this expedition

Lord Denbigh's squadron

Flew the flag of England at the main mast

Sir John Pennington's squadron

Flew the flag of Scotland at the main mast

Of note: A fleet of 100 ships was assembled for the Siege of Saint-Martin-de-Ré, France in 1627, this was the only time an English admiral flew the Scottish saltire as his command flag.

=== Standardisation of command flags after (1627–1649) ===
From 1628 following the creation of the Board of Admiralty and the post of Lord Admiral placed in abeyance the Royal Standard was not used thereafter as the command flag at sea for a Commander-in-Chief of the English Navy. The Lord High Admiral's office was revived only two more times after this date in 1702 and in 1828 with the office holders functioning in an administrative capacity.

==== Flag officers small fleets ====
Included: (Note: The origins of the earlier flag of Great Britain date back to 1606. James VI of Scotland had inherited the English and Irish thrones in 1603 as James I, thereby uniting the crowns of England, Scotland, and Ireland in a personal union, although the three kingdoms remained separate states. On 12 April 1606, a new flag to represent this regal union between England and Scotland was specified in a royal decree, according to which the flag of England (a red cross on a white background, known as St George's Cross), and the flag of Scotland (a white saltire on a blue background, known as the Saltire or St Andrew's Cross), would be joined together, forming the flag of England and Scotland for maritime purposes. King James also began to refer to a "Kingdom of Great Britaine", although the union remained a personal one.)

The senior Admiral to fly the Union Flag main mast unless he was Lord Admiral, in which case the Royal Standard is flown. The second-in-command Vice Admiral to fly a Union Flag at the fore mast and third-in-command Rear Admiral a Union Flag flown at the mizzen mast

Note: Small fleets that consisted of three squadrons the admirals commanding were instructed to fly the above command flags in their correct positions.

==== Flag officers large fleets ====
Included:

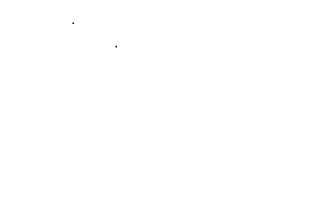
Admiral of the White Squadron command flag 1625–1649

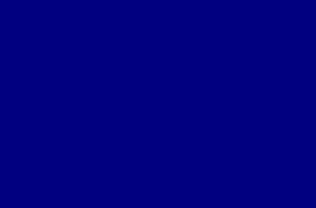
Admiral of the Blue Squadron command flag 1625–1649

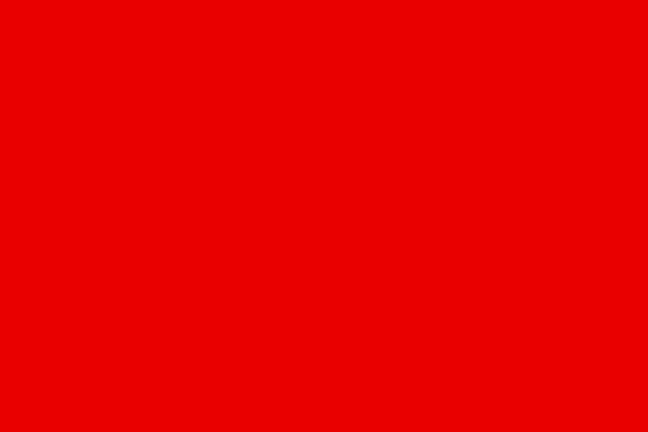
Vice Admiral of the Red Squadron command flag 1625–1649

Order of precedence The squadrons ranked in order red, white, and blue, with admirals ranked according to their squadron with their command flags flown in their respective positions

1. Admiral of the Fleet
2. Admiral of the White
3. Admiral of the Blue
4. Vice Admiral of the Red (no rank of admiral of the red until 1805)
5. Vice Admiral of the White
6. Vice Admiral of the Blue
7. Rear Admiral of the Red
8. Rear Admiral of the White
9. Rear Admiral of the Blue
10. Commodore of the Red
11. Commodore of the White
12. Commodore of the Blue

=== Changes in command flags Commonwealth of England (1649–1660) ===
Following the execution of Charles I of England, the royal standard was replaced by the Commonwealth standard, with the cross and harp this was used as the main command flag for the General's at Sea together with a designated squadron ensign.

Included:

Generals at Sea in command of the red squadron

Flag of the Commonwealth flown at the main mast

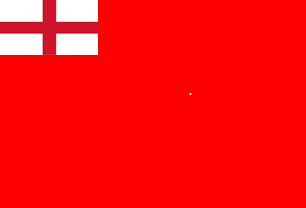
Red ensign flown at the aft mast

Flag dating to 1652–54, currently held by the Royal Museums Greenwich.

Generals at Sea in command of the white squadron

Flag of the Commonwealth flown at the main mast

White ensign flown at the aft mast

Generals at Sea in command of the blue squadron

Flag of the Commonwealth flown at the main mast

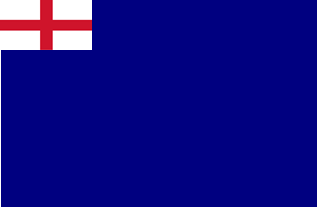
Blue ensign flown at the aft mast

Vice Admiral of the Fleets squadron

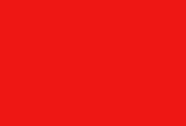
Plain red flag flown at the main mast

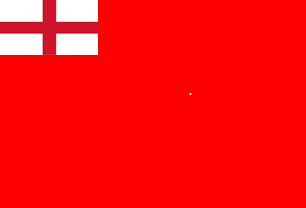
Red ensign flown at the aft mast

Vice Admiral of the Grand squadron

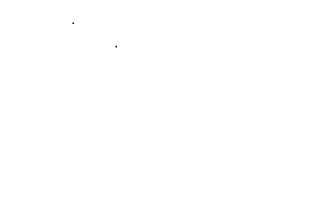
Plain white flag flown at the main mast

White ensign flown at the aft mast

Rear Admiral of the Fleet (Blue) acting as Vice Admiral of the Grand squadron

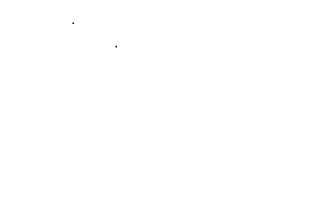
Plain white flag flown at the main mast

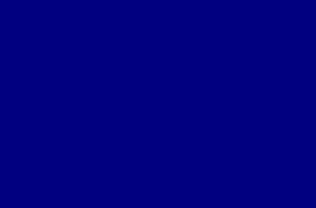
Plain blue flag flown at the fore mast

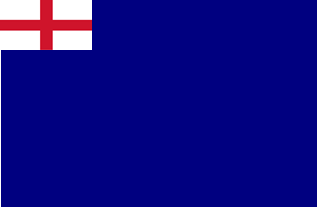
Blue ensign flown at the aft mast

Note: During this period, the rest of the Commonwealth fleet was divided into nine formations each assigned red, white and blue colours that included plain flags and the coloured ensigns.

=== Previous command flags re-established (1660–1702) ===
In 1660, all previous command flags used during the Commonwealth period were changed back to what they were from 1627 to 1649. However during this period we see the introduction of the post of Commodore being initially recognized (though not formally) in November 1674. The Board of Admiralty on the advice of the Navy Board approved the use of the first pendant (later known as a pennant) to denote the command flag of senior officer in charge of a small squadron under a captain as a plain red pendant. The use of the flag became known as The Distinction Pendant to denote a Commander-in-Chief who did not hold flag rank. In January 1684 a proposal was put forward to distinguish two senior officers in a small squadron based on their age difference and relevant naval experience it recommended the issuing of two pendants a plain red of distinction with a white cross for the officer of distinction and a smaller plain red for the officer of the ordinary this separating of two types of commodores would evolve into those of the first class and second class. In 1734 the title of commodore was formally approved by an Order in Council. In 1806 the temporary flag rank of Commodore was to be distinguished by a 'Broad Plain Pennant' of either red, white or blue. The ordinary commodore commanding a ship themselves would have the same coloured pennants but with a single large white ball near the staff. Below for illustrative purpose is what they might have looked like.

Note: Perrin (1922) in his descriptions of admirals command flags does not mention the commodore ordinary of the white squadrons pendant in relation to the 1805 changes thus we must assume that as the Red and Blue squadrons officers were changed to large white balls; the white squadron had to have a large red ball.

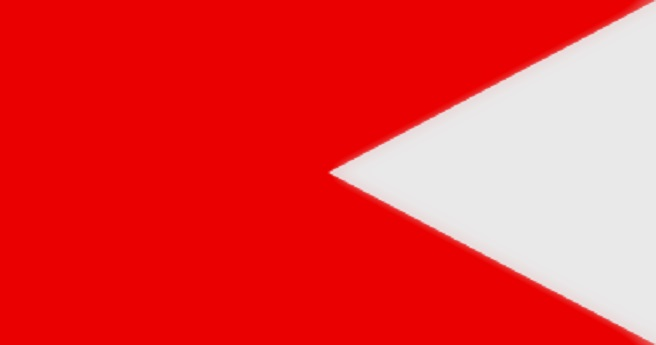
Commodore distinction red squadron 1674

Commodore distinction white squadron 1674

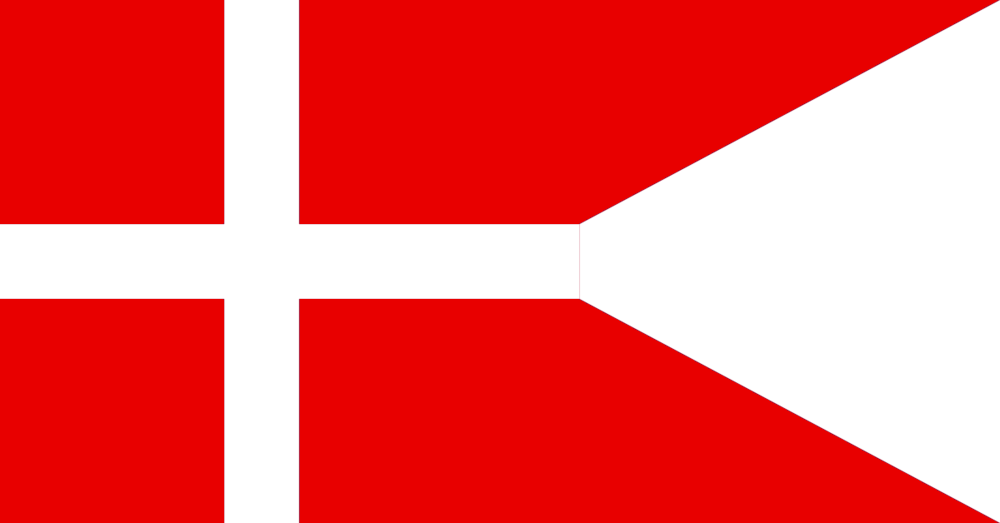
Commodore distinction pendant 1684

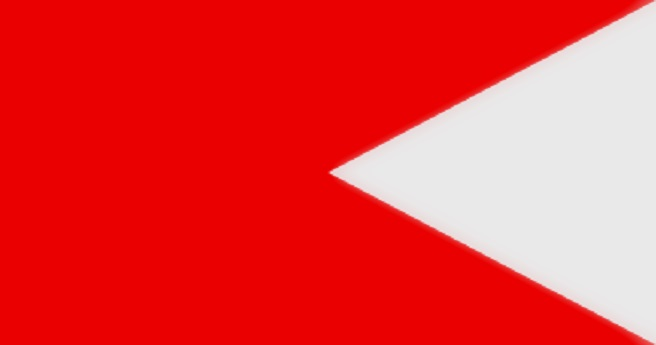
Commodore ordinary pendant 1684
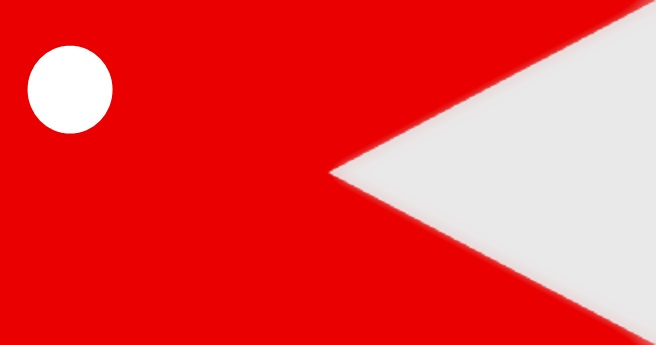
Commodore ordinary red squadron 1805.

Commodore ordinary white squadron 1805.

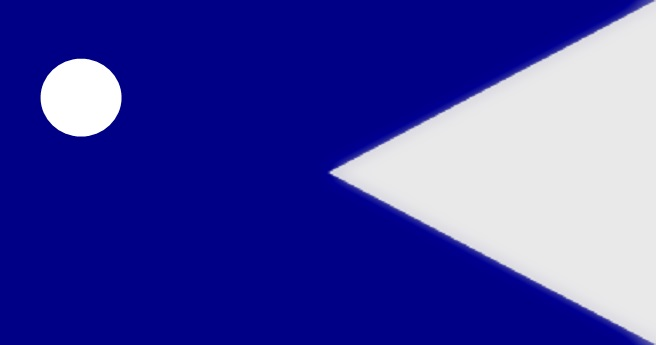
Commodore ordinary blue squadron 1805.

=== Changes in command flags in February (1702) ===
Included:

In February 1702 the Senior Naval Lord Sir George Rooke sent instructions to the Navy Board requesting a new structure for command flags to be flown.

Lord High Admiral

Lord Admiral the Royal standard flown at the main mast

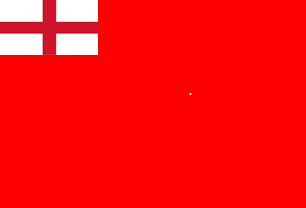
Red ensign flown at the aft mast

Vice and Rear Admirals in red squadron

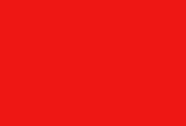
Vice and Rear Admiral's of the Lord Admiral's squadron fly plain red flags at the main mast

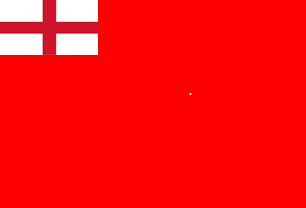
Red ensign flown at the aft mast

Admiral of the White

Flag of the Union at the main mast

White ensign flown at the aft mast

Vice and Rear Admirals in white squadron

Vice Admiral flies Union Flag at the fore mast and Rear Admiral of the squadron flies the Union Flag at the mizzen mast

Both flag officers fly the white ensign at the aft mast

Admiral of the Blue

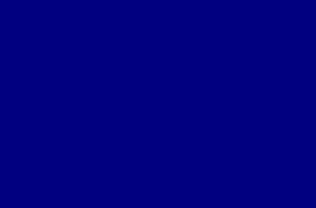
Plain blue flag flown at the fore mast

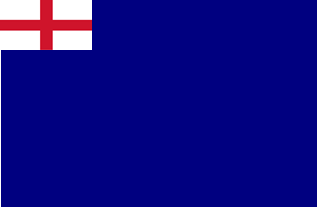
Blue ensign flown at the aft mast

=== Changes in command flags from March (1702–1864) ===
On 24 March 1702 the First Lord of the Admiralty instructed the Senior Naval Lord Admiral Sir George Rooke and Board of Admiralty to have designed new command flags for flag officers. These would remain in place with some minor changes until 1805 when the rank of Admiral of the Red is introduced and included the following:

==== Admiral of the Fleet ====
Flag of the union flown at main topgallant masthead as his proper flag. The Union Flag was used as a maritime flag in 1606 during the reign of James VI and I (of Scotland 1567–1625, of England and Ireland 1603–1625), the Union of the Crowns taking place in 1603.

Admiral of the Fleet to fly the Union Flag of the Union later Great Britain (1606–1801) as his proper flag

Admiral of the Fleet to fly the Union Flag of the United Kingdom (1801–current) as his proper flag

==== Admirals ====
Flags flown at main topgallant masthead as his proper flag

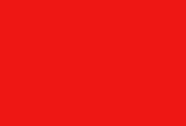
Admiral of the Red Squadron command flag 1805–1864 for use in the Kingdom of Great Britain and United Kingdom

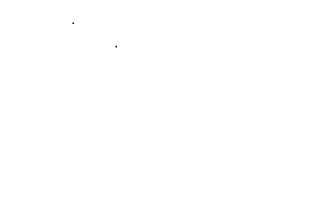
Admiral of the White Squadron command flag 1625–1702 for use in the Kingdom of England and Great Britain

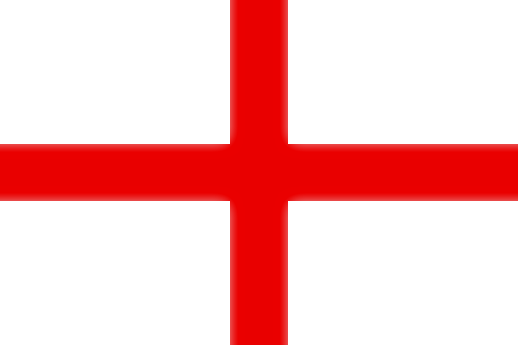
Admiral of the White Squadron command flag 1702–1864 for use in the Kingdom of England, Great Britain and the United Kingdom

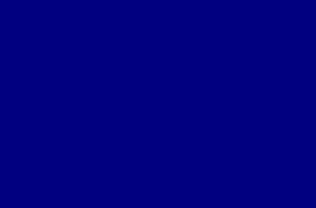
Admiral of the Blue Squadron command flag 1625–1864 for use in the Kingdom of England, Great Britain and the United Kingdom

==== Vice Admirals ====
Flags flown at the fore topgallant masthead as his proper flag

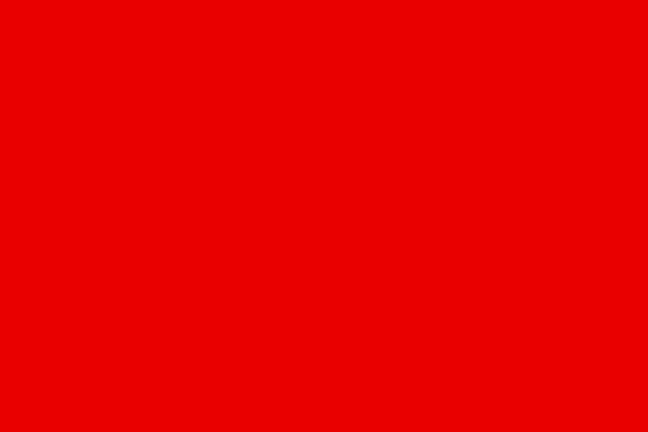
Vice Admiral of the Red Squadron command flag 1702–1805 for use in the Kingdom of Great Britain

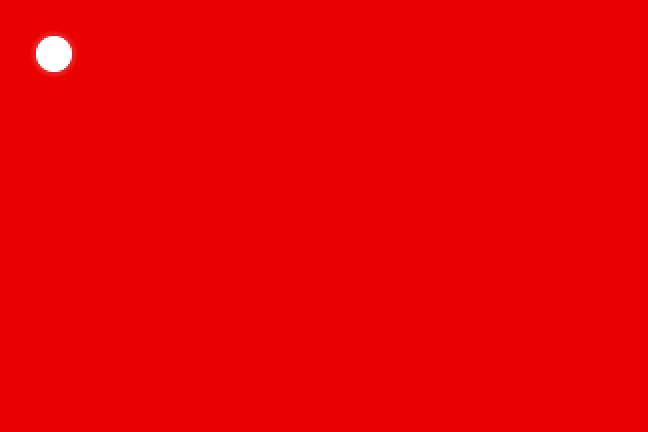
Vice Admiral of the Red Squadron command flag 1805–1864 for use in the Kingdom of Great Britain and the United Kingdom

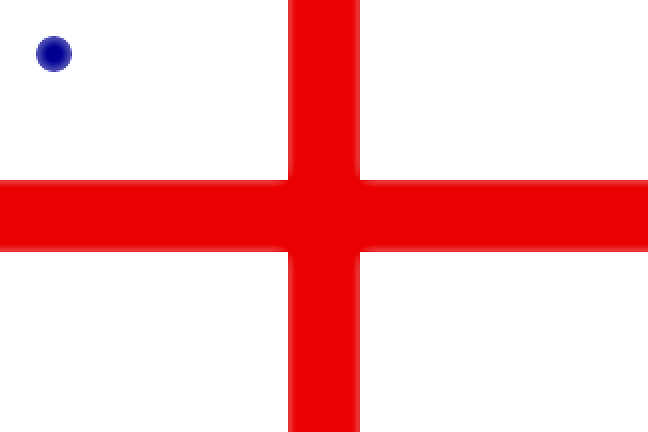
Vice Admiral of the White Squadron command flag 1702–1805 for use in the Kingdom of Great Britain

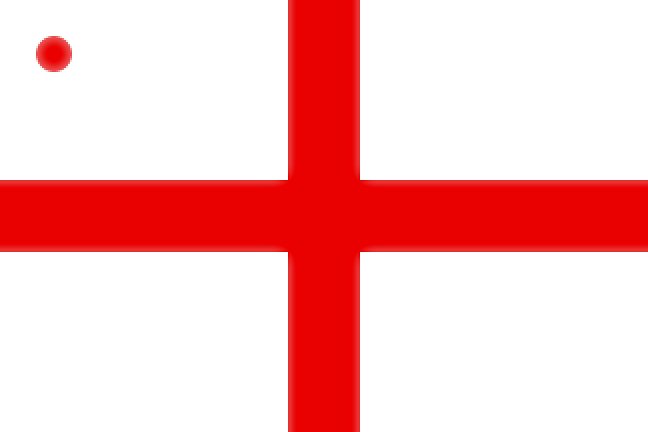
Vice Admiral of the White Squadron command flag 1805–1864 for use in the Kingdom of Great Britain and the United Kingdom

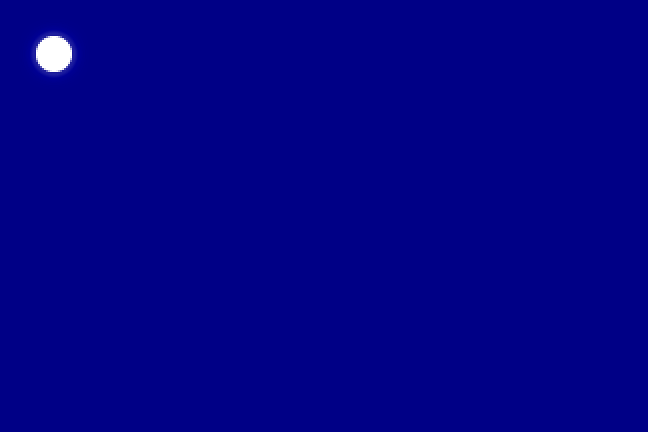
Vice Admiral of the Blue Squadron command flag 1702–1864 for use in the Kingdom of Great Britain and the United Kingdom

==== Rear Admirals ====
Flags flown at the mizzen topgallant masthead as his proper flag

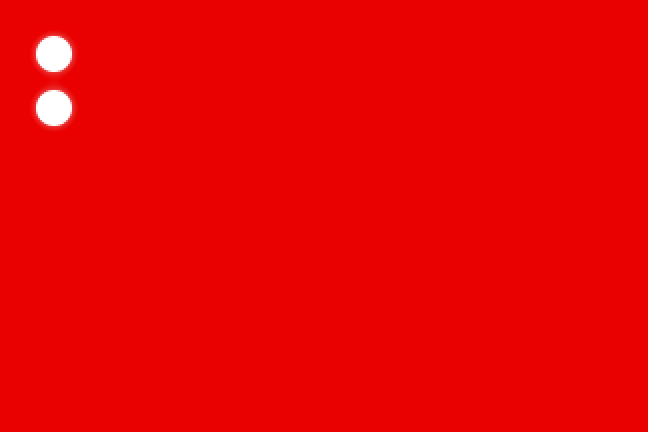
Rear Admiral of the Red Squadron command flag 1702–1864 for use in the Kingdom of Great Britain and the United Kingdom

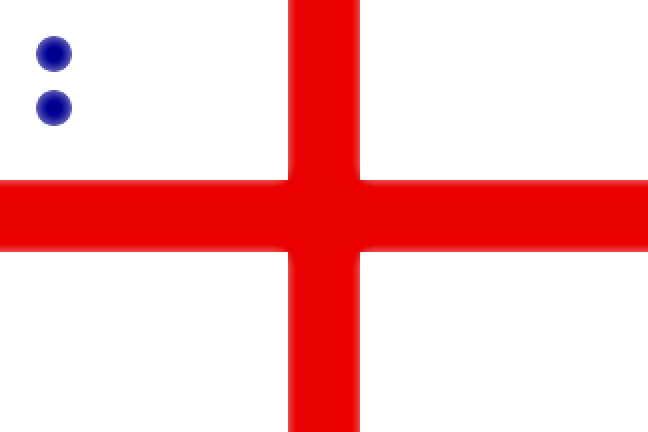
Rear Admiral of the White Squadron command flag 1702–1805 for use in the Kingdom of Great Britain and the United Kingdom

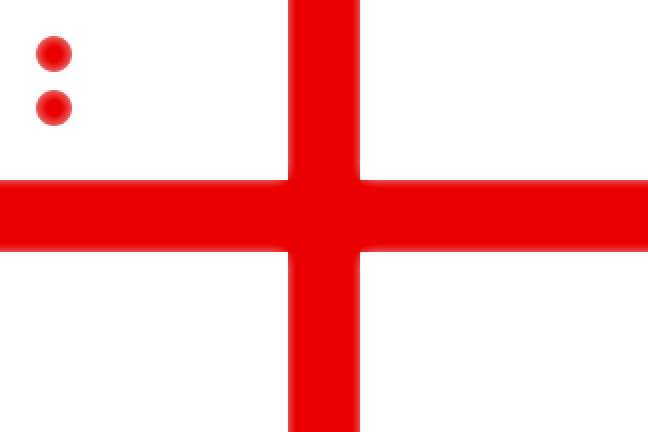
Rear Admiral of the White Squadron command flag 1805 to 1864 for use in the Kingdom of Great Britain and the United Kingdom

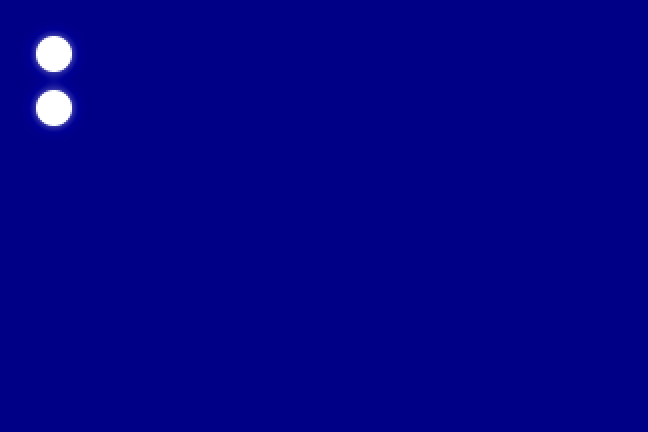
Rear Admiral of the Blue Squadron command flag 1702–1864 for use in the Kingdom of Great Britain and the United Kingdom

==== Commodores ====
Broad pennants flown at the mizzen topgallant masthead as his proper flag.

Included: (Note: The rank of commodore was introduced during the 17th century though not legally established until 1806. They were formally separated into first class (those with subordinate line captains) and second class (those commanding ships themselves) in 1826. The previous broad red and blue pennants were abolished in 1864 along with the coloured squadrons, the commodore of the white's broad pennant with the cross of St George remained as the command flag for a first class commodore. The white broad pennant with a red ball was introduced as the command flag for the second class commodore. These two flags existed until 1958 when the broad pennant without a ball was abolished leaving the pennant with a single red ball to cover all Royal Navy commodores.)

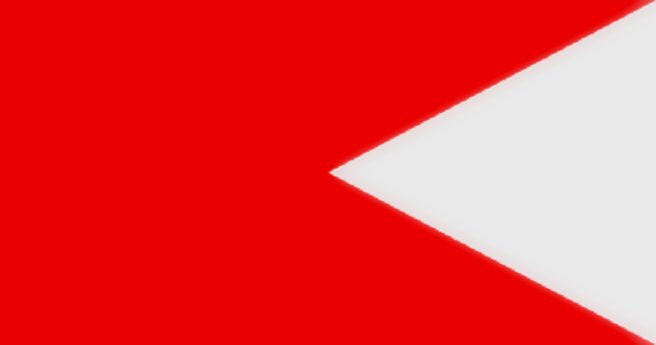
Commodore first class Red Squadron command flag 1826–1864 for use in the Kingdom of Great Britain and United Kingdom

Commodore first class White Squadron command flag 1826–1864 for use in the Kingdom of Great Britain and United Kingdom

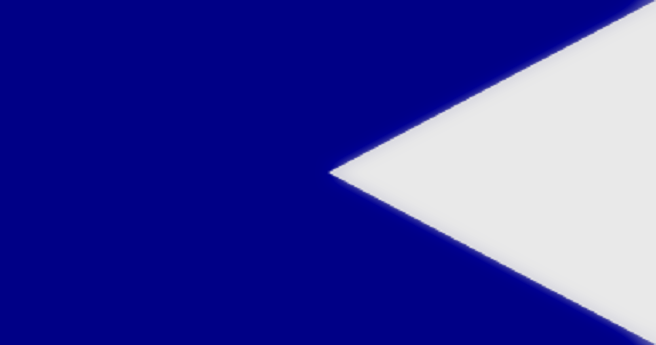
Commodore second class all squadrons a plain blue command flag 1826–1864 for use in the Kingdom of Great Britain and the United Kingdom

Order of precedence from 1805

The squadrons ranked in order red, white, and blue, with admirals ranked according to their squadron with their command flags flown in their respective positions:

1. Admiral of the Fleet
2. Admiral of the Red
3. Admiral of the White
4. Admiral of the Blue
5. Vice Admiral of the Red
6. Vice Admiral of the White
7. Vice Admiral of the Blue
8. Rear Admiral of the Red
9. Rear Admiral of the White
10. Rear Admiral of the Blue
11. Commodore of the Red
12. Commodore of the White
13. Commodore of the Blue

=== Changes in command flags and standardized from (1864–current) ===
==== Admirals of the Fleet ====
Admiral of the Fleet, Royal Navy command flag for use in the United Kingdom from 1864

==== Admirals ====
Admiral of the Royal Navy command flag for use in the United Kingdom from 1864

==== Vice Admirals ====
Vice Admiral of the Royal Navy command flag for use in the United Kingdom from 1864

==== Rear Admirals ====
Rear Admiral of the Royal Navy command flag for use in the United Kingdom from 1864

==== Commodores ====
Included:

Commodore first class of the Royal Navy command flag for use in the United Kingdom from 1864 to 1954

Commodore second class of the Royal Navy command flag for use in the United Kingdom from 1864 to 1954

Commodore of the Royal Navy command flag for use in the United Kingdom from 1954

== Standard squadron colours ==
Coloured squadrons were established as early as the 1580s. In 1864, after approximately 368 years, the designation of coloured squadrons and the promotion path of flag officers under this system were abolished.

=== Descriptions of flags of admirals of the colour ===
Included:

1. Lord Admiral and Lord High Admiral of England (royal standard, on three occasions the admiralty anchor flag to 1702)
2. Admiral of the Fleet (flag of England or Union Flag or Royal Standard if instructed to fly it or flag of the Commonwealth of England to 1864)
3. Admiral of the Red (plain red flag 1805–1864)
4. Admiral of the White (plain white flag 1625–1705)
5. Admiral of the White (St George flag 1702–1864)
6. Admiral of the Blue (plain blue flag 1625–1864)
7. Vice Admiral of the Red (plain red flag 1702–1805)
8. Vice Admiral of the Red (plain red flag with one white ball in the upper left canton from 1805 to 1864)
9. Vice Admiral of the White (Cross of St George with one blue ball in the upper left canton from 1702 to 1805)
10. Vice Admiral of the White (Cross of St George with one red ball in the upper left canton from 1805 to 1864)
11. Rear Admiral of the Blue (plain blue flag with one white ball in the upper left canton from 1702 to 1864)
12. Rear Admiral of the Red (plain red flag with two white balls in the upper left canton from 1702 to 1864)
13. Rear Admiral of the White (Cross of St George with two blue balls in the upper left canton from 1702 to 1805)
14. Rear Admiral of the White (Cross of St George with two white balls in the upper left canton from 1805 to 1864)
15. Rear Admiral of the Blue (plain blue flag with two white balls in the upper left canton from 1702 to 1864)
16. Commodore of the Red first class (plain red broad pennant from 1826 to 1864)
17. Commodore of the White first class (Cross of St George on a white broad pennant from 1826 to 1864)
18. Commodore of the White second class (Cross of St George with a red ball in the upper left canton on a white broad pennant from 1864 to 1954)
19. Commodore of the Blue second class all squadrons (plain blue broad pennant from 1826 to 1864)

Note:First and second class commodore ranks were introduced in 1826 the first class commodore commanded captains and ships the second class commodore flew a different broad pennant when on board a ship and in command himself.

Rank flags from 1864

1. Admiral of the Fleet (Union Flag 1864–present)
2. Admiral (Cross of St George 1864–present)
3. Vice Admiral (Cross of St George with a larger single red ball upper left canton)
4. Rear Admiral (Cross of t George with two larger red balls upper left canton)
5. Commodore (Cross of St George on a white broad pennant 1954–present)
6. Commodore first class (Cross of St George on a white broad pennant 1864–1954)
7. Commodore second class (Cross of St George with a red ball in the upper left canton on a white broad pennant 1864–1954)

== See also ==
- Maritime flag
- Glossary of flag terms
- William Gordon Perrin
