= Vice-Admiral of the Red =

Rank of the navy of the United Kingdom

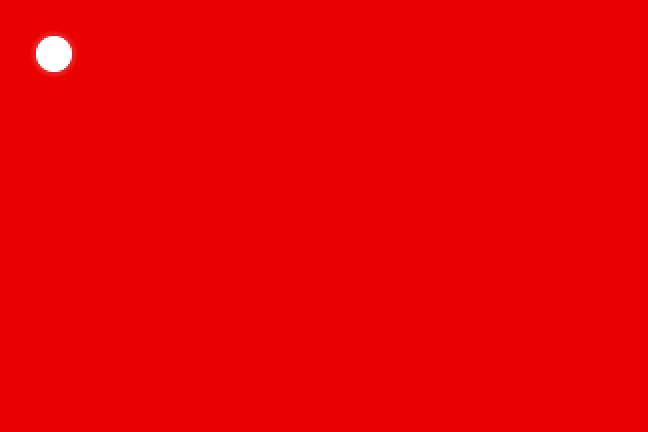
- Command flag (1805–1864)
- Country: United Kingdom
- Service branch: Royal Navy
- Abbreviation: VAR
- Next higher rank: Admiral of the Blue
- Next lower rank: Vice-Admiral of the White

Vice-Admiral of the Red was a senior rank of the Royal Navy of the United Kingdom, immediately outranked by the rank Admiral of the Blue (see order of precedence below). Royal Navy officers currently holding the ranks of commodore, rear admiral, vice admiral and admiral of the fleet are sometimes considered generically to be admirals. From 1688 to 1805 this rank was in order of precedence fourth; after 1805 it was the fifth. In 1864 it was abolished as a promotional rank. (pictured opposite is the command flag for a vice-admiral of the Red).

== History ==
The Royal Navy inaugurated squadron colours during the reign of Elizabeth I (1558-1603) to subdivide the English fleet into three squadrons. There were three classes of admirals and differentiated by using coloured flags. In 1620 the official flag ranks of Admiral, Vice Admiral, and Rear Admiral were legally established that arose directly out of the organisation of the fleet into three parts. The rank of Admiral of the Fleet was formally introduced in 1688.

The Vice-Admiral of the Red was a senior rank of the Royal Navy of the United Kingdom, immediately outranked by the rank Admiral of the Blue (see order of precedence below). Royal Navy officers currently holding the ranks of commodore, rear admiral, vice admiral and admiral of the fleet are sometimes considered generically to be admirals. From 1688 to 1805 this rank was in order of precedence fourth; after 1805 it was the fifth. In 1864 it was abolished as a promotional rank.

== Order of precedence Admirals of the Colour ==
The Navy was divided into three squadrons Red, White and Blue in order of seniority. Admirals were appointed to these squadrons and therefore their rank and squadron split the seniority originally into 9 bands then later 10 with ‘Admiral of the Fleet' as senior to all others.

Seniority was therefore from 1805 to 1864:

1. Admiral of the Fleet
2. Admiral of the Red squadron (rank created in 1805)
3. Admiral of the White squadron
4. Admiral of the Blue squadron
5. Vice-admiral of the Red squadron
6. Vice-admiral of the White squadron
7. Vice-admiral of the Blue squadron
8. Rear-admiral of the Red squadron
9. Rear-admiral of the White squadron
10. Rear-admiral of the Blue squadron

Seniority was therefore from 1688 to 1805:

1. Admiral of the Fleet, (rank created in 1688)
2. Admiral of the White squadron
3. Admiral of the Blue squadron
4. Vice-admiral of the Red squadron
5. Vice-admiral of the White squadron
6. Vice-admiral of the Blue squadron
7. Rear-admiral of the Red squadron
8. Rear-admiral of the White squadron
9. Rear-admiral of the Blue squadron

Admirals without an appointment were colloquially referred to as Yellow admirals. Ships of the Royal Navy flew the Ensign that coincided with the squadron of their commanding officer.

== Former command flag 1625 to 1805 ==
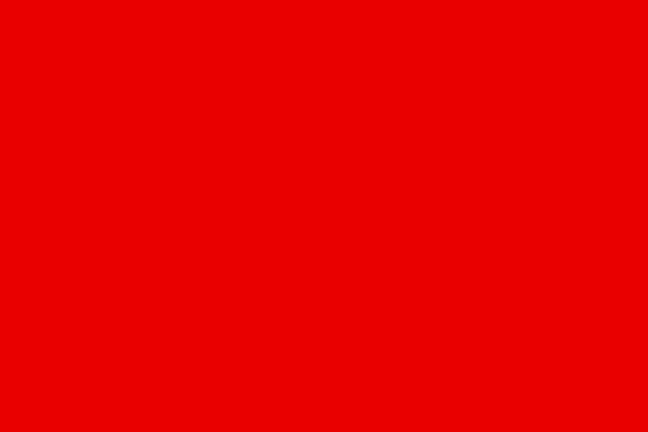
Vice-admiral of the Red squadron command flag 1625 to 1805.

== See also ==
1. List of command flags of the Royal Navy

== Sources ==
1. Perrin, W. G. (William Gordon) (1922). "Flags of Command: Admirals Flags". British flags, their early history, and their development at sea; with an account of the origin of the flag as a national device. Cambridge, England: Cambridge : The University Press.
2. Squadron Colours" (2014), (PDF). National Museum of the Royal Navy.
