= Battle of Toulon (1744) order of battle =

Order of Battle previously included in main article on Battle of Toulon 1744

The Battle of Toulon, also known as the Battle of Cape Sicié, took place between 21 and 22 February 1744 NS (Note: The dates of the battle were 21 to 22 February 1744 (New Style (NS)) according to the Gregorian calendar then used by France and Spain. The British still used the Julian calendar, which gave dates of 10–11 February 1744 (OS)) near the French Mediterranean port of Toulon. Although France was not yet at war with Great Britain, ships from their Levant Fleet combined with a Spanish force, which had been trapped in Toulon for two years, to break the blockade imposed by the British Mediterranean Fleet.

The initial engagement on 21 February was largely indecisive and the British continued their pursuit until midday on 22nd before their commander, Admiral Thomas Mathews, called off the chase. With several of his ships in need of repair, he withdrew to Menorca, which meant the Royal Navy temporarily lost control of the waters around Italy and allowed the Spanish to take the offensive against Savoy.

In his report, Mathews blamed his subordinate Richard Lestock for the failure and the issue was hotly debated in Parliament. At the subsequent court-martial, Mathews was held responsible and dismissed from the navy in June 1747, while Lestock's political connections meant he was cleared of all charges. Another seven captains were removed from command for failing to engage the enemy and the investigation led to changes that required individual captains to be far more aggressive.

== Order of battle ==
=== Franco-Spanish fleet ===
Franco-Spanish fleet
Ship	Rate	Guns	Commander	Notes
Van
Borée	Third-rate	64	Captain Marqueu	
Toulouse	Fourth-rate	60	Captain Dárton	
Tigre	Fourth-rate	50	Captain Saurin	
Éole	Third-rate	64	Captain D'Alver	
Alcyon	Fourth-rate	56	Captain Lancel	
Duc D'Orléans	Third-rate	68	Captain Dornés	
Espoir	Third-rate	74	Captain D'Hericourt (Ensign of Gavaret)	
Centre
Trident	Third-rate	64	Captain Caylus	
Heureux	Fourth-rate	60	Captain Gramier	
Achiléon	Fourth-rate	60	Captain Vaudevil	
Solide	Third-rate	64	Captain Chateauneuf	
Diamant	Fourth-rate	50	Captain Manak	
Ferme	Third-rate	70	Captain Gorgues	
Terrible	Third-rate	74	Vice-Admiral De Court; Captain Jonquiere	
Sancti Espiritus	Third-rate	68	Captain Poison	
Sérieux	Third-rate	64	Captain Cahyla	
Rear
Oriente	Fourth-rate	60	Captain Joaquín Villena	
América	Fourth-rate	60	Captain Aníbal Petrucci	
Neptuno	Fourth-rate	60	Captain Enrique Olivares †	
Poder	Fourth-rate	60	Captain Rodrigo de Urrutia (POW)	Captured by the British; Recaptured and scuttled by the French
Constante	Third-rate	70	Captain Agustín Iturriaga †	Badly damaged and taken under tow
Real Felipe	First-rate	110	Admiral Jose Navarro; Captain Nicolas Geraldino †	Badly damaged and taken under tow
Hércules	Third-rate	64	Captain Cosme Álvarez	
Brillante	Fourth-rate	60	Captain don Blas de la Barreda	
Alcón	Fourth-rate	60	Captain José Rentería	
San Fernando	Third-rate	64	Count of Vegaflorida	
Soberbio	Fourth-rate	50	Captain Juan Valdés	
Santa Isabel	Third-rate	80	Captain Ignacio Dautevil	

4 frigates, 4 fire ships

=== British fleet ===
British fleet
Ship	Rate	Guns	Commander	Notes
Van
HMS Nassau	Third-rate	70	Captain James Lloyd	
HMS Chichester	Third-rate	80	Captain William Dilkes	Dilkes court-martialled and dismissed, later restored
HMS Boyne	Third-rate	80	Captain Rowland Frogmore	Frogmore died before being court-martialled
HMS Barfleur	Second-rate	90	Rear-Admiral William Rowley (Red); Captain Meyrick de L'Angle	Damaged; 25 killed, 20 wounded
HMS Ranelagh	Third-rate	80	Captain Henry Osborn	
HMS Berwick	Third-rate	70	Captain Edward Hawke	17 members of the Prize crew taken prisoner when the French recaptured the Poder
HMS Stirling Castle	Third-rate	70	Captain Thomas Cooper	
HMS Bedford	Third-rate	70	Captain Hon. George Townshend	
HMS Feversham	Fifth-rate	40	Captain John Watkins	
HMS Winchelsea	Sixth-rate	20	Captain William Marsh	
Centre
HMS Dragon	Fourth-rate	60	Captain Charles Watson	
HMS Royal Oak	Third-rate	70	Captain Edmund Williams	Williams court-martialled and dismissed
HMS Princess	Third-rate	70	Captain Robert Pett	Damaged; 8 killed, 20 wounded
HMS Somerset	Third-rate	80	Captain George Slater	
HMS Norfolk	Third-rate	80	Captain Hon. John Forbes	Damaged; 12 killed, 25 wounded
HMS Marlborough	Second-rate	90	Captain James Cornewall †	Badly damaged; 53 killed, 138 wounded
HMS Dorsetshire	Third-rate	80	Captain George Burrish	Burrish court-martialled and dismissed
HMS Essex	Third-rate	70	Captain Richard Norris	Norris court-martialled and dismissed
HMS Rupert	Third-rate	60	Captain John Ambrose	Ambrose court-martialled and suspended for a year
HMS Namur (Flagship)	Second-rate	90	Admiral Thomas Mathews (Blue); Captain John Russell †	Damaged; 8 killed, 20 wounded
HMS Dursley Galley	Sixth-rate	20	Captain Giles Vanbrugh	
HMS Anne Galley	Fire ship	8	Commander James Mackie †	Blew up, 25 killed
HMS Sutherland	Hospital ship	18	Lieutenant Lord Colville	
Rear
HMS Salisbury	Fourth-rate	50	Captain Peter Osborne	
HMS Romney	Fourth-rate	50	Captain Henry Godsalve	
HMS Dunkirk	Third-rate	60	Captain Charles Wager Purvis	
HMS Swiftsure	Third-rate	70	Captain George Berkeley	
HMS Cambridge	Third-rate	80	Captain Charles Drummond	
HMS Neptune	Second-rate	90	Vice-Admiral Richard Lestock (White); Captain George Stepney	
HMS Torbay	Third-rate	80	Captain John Gascoigne	
HMS Russell	Third-rate	80	Captain Robert Long	
HMS Buckingham	Third-rate	70	Captain John Towry	
HMS Elizabeth	Third-rate	70	Captain Joshua Lingen	
HMS Kingston	Third-rate	60	Captain John Lovatt	
HMS Oxford	Fourth-rate	50	Captain Harry Powlett	
HMS Warwick	Third-rate	60	Captain Temple West	
HMS Mercury	Fire ship	8	Commander Moses Peadle	

== Sources ==
- Allen, Joseph (1842). "Admirals Mathews and Lestock". United Service Magazine.
- Baugh, Daniel (2004). "Mathews, Thomas (1676–1751)". Oxford Dictionary of National Biography (online ed.). Oxford University Press. doi:10.1093/ref:odnb/18332. (Subscription or UK public library membership required.)
- Dull, Jonathan R (2009). The Age of the Ship of the Line: The British and French Navies, 1650–1815 (Studies in War, Society, and the Military). University of Nebraska Press. ISBN 978-0803219304.
- Schomberg, Isaac (1802). Naval Chronology; or, an Historical Summary of Naval and Maritime Events from the Time of the Romans, to the Treaty of Peace 1802 (2015 ed.). Cambridge University Press. ISBN 978-1139878494.
