= Battle of Toulon (1744) =

1744 battle of the War of the Austrian Succession

Coordinates: 42°46′45″N 5°41′27″E

- Part of the War of the Austrian Succession
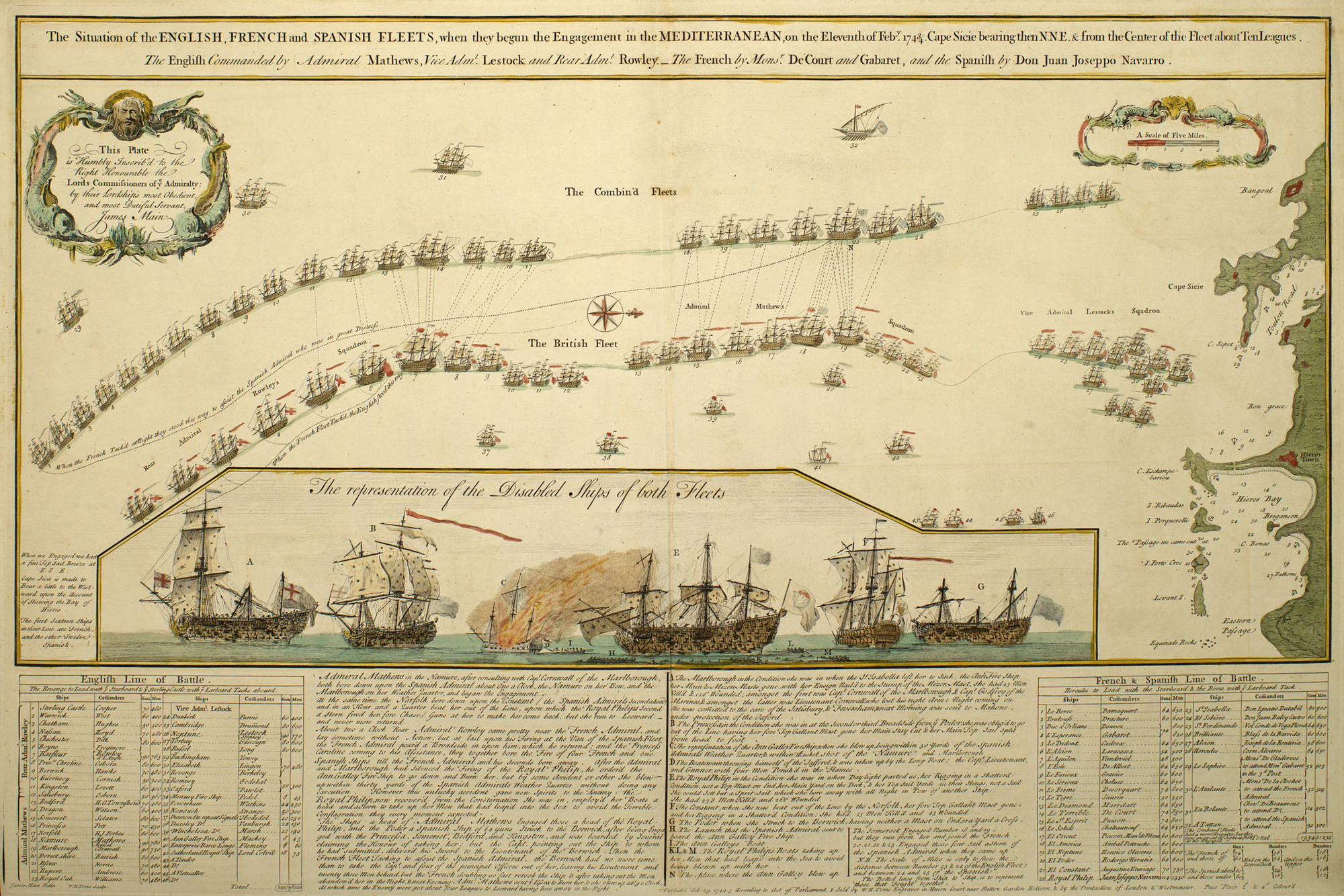
- British map of the battle
| Date | 21 to 22 February 1744 New Style; 11 to 12 February Old Style |
| Location | Off Toulon, Mediterranean Sea |
| Result | See Aftermath |

Belligerents
| Spain; France | Great Britain |

Commanders and leaders
| Juan José Navarro; Claude de La Bruyère | Thomas Mathews; Richard Lestock; William Rowley |

Strength
| 28 ships of the line 4 frigates 4 fireships | 32 ships of the line 2 frigates 2 fireships 1 hospital ship |

Casualties and losses
| 149 killed 467 wounded 1 ship of the line scuttled | 133 killed 223 wounded 17 captured 1 fireship destroyed |

The Battle of Toulon (Note: Also known as the Battle of Cape Sicié) took place on 21 and 22 February 1744 NS (Note: The dates of the battle were 21 to 22 February 1744 (New Style (NS)) according to the Gregorian calendar then used by France and Spain. The British still used the Julian calendar, which gave dates of 10–11 February 1744 (OS)) near the French Mediterranean port of Toulon. Although France was not yet at war with Britain, ships from their Levant Fleet supported an attempt by a Spanish force trapped in Toulon to break through the British Mediterranean Fleet.

The initial engagement on 21 February was indecisive, and the British continued their pursuit until midday on 22nd before their commander, Admiral of the Blue Thomas Mathews, called off the chase. With several of his ships in need of repair, he withdrew to Menorca, which meant the British Royal Navy temporarily lost control of the waters around Italy and allowed the Spanish to take the offensive against Savoy.

In his report, Mathews blamed his subordinate Vice-Admiral of the White Richard Lestock for the failure to secure victory, and the issue was hotly debated in Parliament. At the subsequent court-martial, Mathews was held responsible and dismissed from the navy in June 1747, while Lestock's political connections meant he was cleared of all charges. Another seven captains were removed from command for failing to engage the enemy and the investigation led to changes that required individual captains to be far more aggressive.

== Background ==
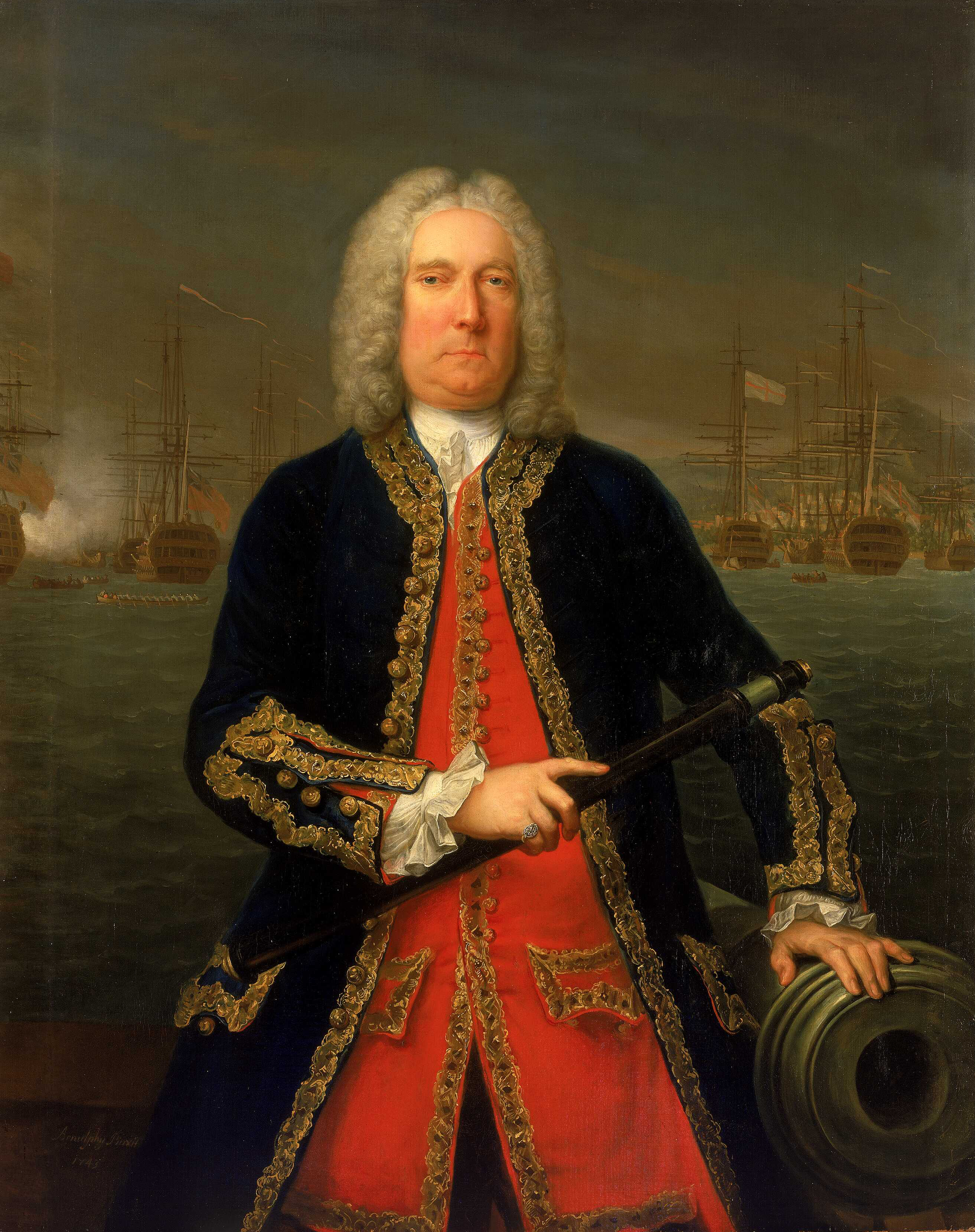
Thomas Mathews, whose poor relationship with his subordinate Richard Lestock affected the battle

The immediate cause of the War of the Austrian Succession was the death in 1740 of Emperor Charles VI, the last male Habsburg. This left his eldest daughter, Maria Theresa, as heir to the Habsburg monarchy, (Note: Often referred to as 'Austria', this included Austria, Hungary, Croatia, Bohemia, the Austrian Netherlands, and Parma) whose laws excluded women from the succession. The 1713 Pragmatic Sanction waived this and allowed her to inherit, but this was challenged by Charles Albert of Bavaria, the closest male heir.

While the House of Habsburg was the largest single component of the Holy Roman Empire, its pre-eminent position was challenged by rivals like Bavaria, Saxony and Prussia. With the help of France, these states turned a dynastic dispute into a European conflict and in January 1742 Charles of Bavaria became the first non-Habsburg Emperor in nearly 300 years. He was opposed by Maria Theresa and the so-called Pragmatic Allies, which in addition to Austria included Britain, Hanover and the Dutch Republic.

Although French and British troops fought against each other at Dettingen in June 1743, the two kingdoms were not yet formally at war. In contrast, Spain and Britain had been fighting the War of Jenkins' Ear since 1739, primarily in Spanish America, but also in the Mediterranean, where in 1742 a Spanish squadron led by Juan José Navarro took refuge in the French naval base of Toulon and were prevented from leaving by the British Mediterranean Fleet under Admiral of the Blue Thomas Mathews. In the 1743 Treaty of Fontainebleau, Louis XV of France and his uncle Philip V of Spain, agreed to a joint invasion of Britain and by late January 1744, more than 12,000 French troops and transports had been assembled at Dunkirk.

In an attempt to divert British naval resources from the invasion route, Navarro was ordered to force his way out of Toulon and make for the Atlantic, supported by the French Levant Fleet under Claude Bruyère. Their opponent, Mathews, had entered the Royal Navy in 1690 and enjoyed a solid if unspectacular career before being appointed Commander-in-chief of the Mediterranean in 1742. He had a poor relationship with his deputy Vice-Admiral of the White Richard Lestock, a fact recognised by both officers who had each separately requested that Lestock be reassigned, a request ignored by the Admiralty. The tension between the two men meant Mathews failed to properly discuss tactics with his subordinate prior to the battle, a factor which partially contributed to the later confusion over orders.

== Battle ==
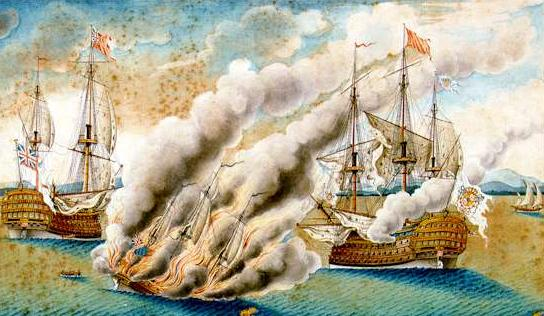
British fireship HMS Anne Galley, aflame and sinking short of her intended target, the Spanish flagship Real Felipe

On 21 February 1744, the combined Franco-Spanish fleet of twenty-seven ships of the line and three frigates put to sea with Mathews in pursuit. The British ships were generally larger and more heavily armed than their opponents, carrying over 25% more cannons overall. Both fleets adopted the traditional formation of vanguard, centre and rear, with Navarro and the Spanish ships in front, followed by two French squadrons. On the British side, Mathews led the van, William Rowley the centre, and Lestock the rear.

Light winds made manoeuvring difficult and caused the two fleets to become spread out but around 11:30 early in the evening of 21 February, the fleets began to approach each other and prepare for battle, with Mathews signalling his ships to form line of battle. Since the line had not been properly formed as night fell, Mathews hoisted the signal to come to or halt by turning into the wind, intending his ships to first finish forming the line. The van and centre squadrons complied with this instruction, but the rear under Lestock obeyed the order to halt immediately, without having formed the line.

By daybreak on 23 February, the rear of the British fleet was separated by a considerable distance from the van and centre. Mathews signalled Lestock to make more sail, reluctant to start the attack with his ships still disorganised, but the slowness of his response caused the Franco-Spanish force to start to slip away to the south. Mathews feared they would escape him and pass through the Strait of Gibraltar to join the French force gathered at Brest for the planned invasion of Britain.

Knowing his duty was to attack, Mathews hoisted the signal to engage the enemy aboard his flagship HMS Namur, and at 1:00 pm left the line to attack the Spanish rear, followed by Captain James Cornewall aboard HMS Marlborough. His earlier signal to form line of battle was still flying, causing confusion among his subordinates. Some followed Mathews, but others were either uncertain which orders to follow, or in Lestock's case, allegedly unwilling to do so.

Outnumbered and largely unsupported, Namur and Marlborough successfully engaged their opposite numbers, but suffered considerable damage. At the rear of the ships being attacked, five more Spanish ships followed, at some distance due to the slow speed of the one ahead: Brillante, San Fernando, Halcon, Soberbio and Santa Isabel. There was some exchange of fire between these and the lead ships of the British rear. Most of Lestock's ships in the rear remained inactive during the battle.

The main action was being fought around Real Felipe, Navarro's flagship. Marlborough purposefully crossed the Spanish line, but suffered such severe damage that she was deemed to be on the verge of sinking. The Hercules, astern of the Real Felipe, vigorously fought off three British ships. The Constante, immediately ahead of the flagship, repelled the attack of a British ship-of-the-line, which was promptly replaced by two more, with which she continued to fight for nearly three hours.

The French ships came about at 5:00 pm to aid the Spanish, a manoeuvre interpreted by some of the British commanders as an attempt to double the British line and surround them. The Spanish, still on the defensive, neglected to capture the defenceless Marlborough, though they did retake the Poder, which had previously surrendered to the British. The Franco-Spanish fleet then resumed their flight to the southwest, and it was not until 23 February that the British were able to regroup and resume the pursuit. They caught up with the enemy fleet again, which was hampered by towing damaged ships, and the unmanoeuvrable Poder was abandoned and scuttled by the French. By now the British had closed to within a few miles of the enemy fleet, but Mathews again signalled for the fleet to come to. The following day, 24 February, the Franco-Spanish fleet was almost out of sight, and Mathews returned to Hyères and sailed from there to Port Mahon, where he arrived in early March.

== Aftermath ==
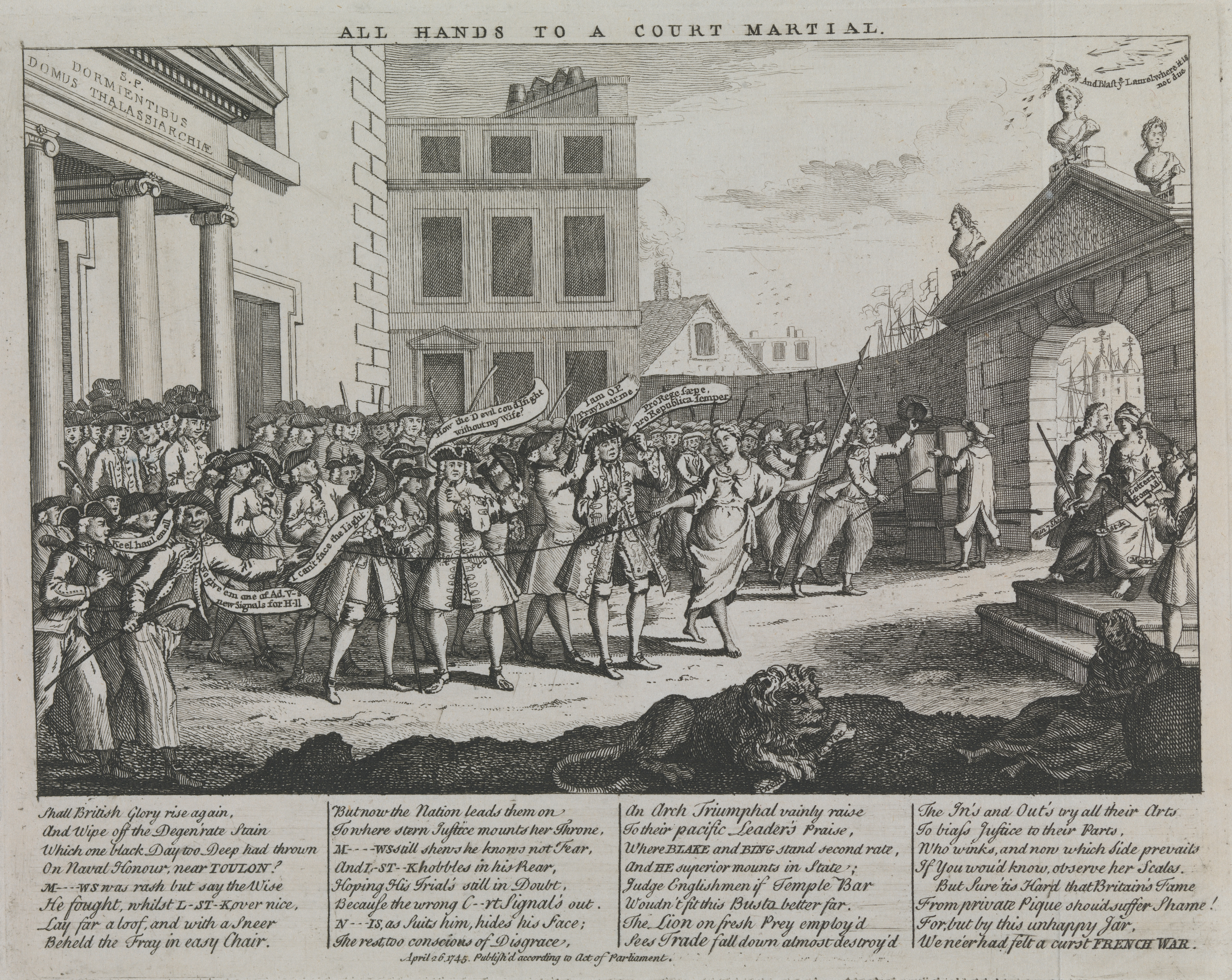
Royal Navy officers attending the post-battle court martial

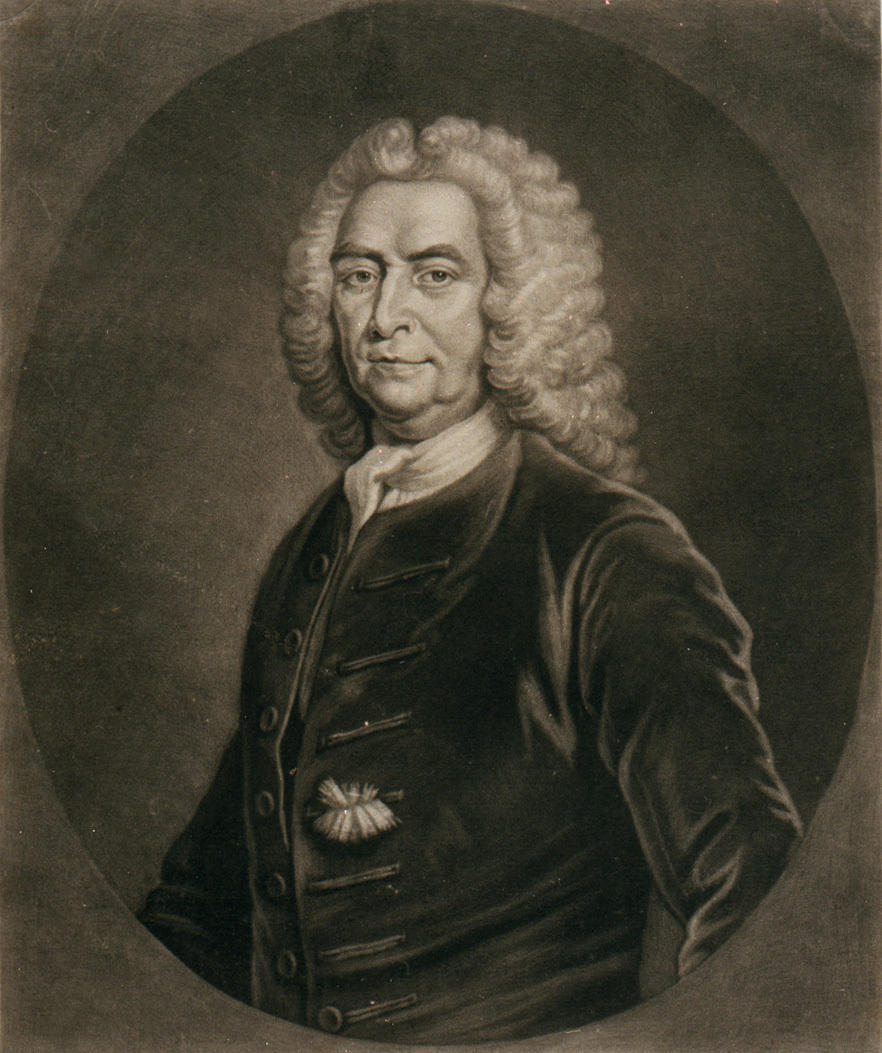
Richard Lestock, whose acquittal was widely criticised and led to changes in the "Fighting Instructions"

While the battle was tactically inconclusive, Mathews' withdrawal to Menorca temporarily lifted the British blockade of the Franco-Spanish army in Northern Italy, allowing them to take the offensive. However, it also led to recriminations among their opponents, with the Spanish viewing the battle as a near victory undone by the poor performance of the French. Navarro was given the title Marqués de la Victoria (Note: English: "Marquis of Victory") by Philip V of Spain, who insisted de la Bruyère be removed from command. The animosity generated by these actions minimised future co-operation between the Spanish and French. Navarro and his ships spent the rest of war trapped in Cartagena by Rowley, who succeeded Mathews as commander in the Mediterranean.

France declared war on Britain and Hanover in March, then invaded the Austrian Netherlands in May. These consequences were blamed on the alleged failure of the British fleet to defeat an inferior opponent, although modern historians argue they had been agreed in October 1743 and were unaffected by Toulon. Parliament demanded a public enquiry, and at the subsequent court-martial, seven captains were cashiered for failing to do their "utmost" to engage the enemy as required by the Articles of War, another two were acquitted, while one died before trial. (Note: These were; (1) George Burrish; HMS Dorsetshire (2) John Ambrose; HMS Rupert (3) Edmund Williams; HMS Royal Oak (4) Richard Norris; HMS Essex (5) Thomas Cooper; HMS Stirling Castle (later restored) (6) James Lloyd; HMS Nassau (7) William Dilkes; HMS Chichester)

Mathews was also court-martialled on charges of having brought the fleet into action in a disorganised manner and failing to attack the enemy when the conditions were advantageous. Although his personal courage was not in question, he was found guilty of failing to comply with the official "Fighting Instructions" which required him to engage in "Line of battle", and dismissed from the navy in June 1747. Despite ignoring his commander's orders, Lestock was acquitted because in doing so he followed the precise letter of the instructions and was promoted Admiral of the Blue, although he died shortly afterwards in December 1746.

The judgements were unpopular with the public, a contemporary declaring "The nation could not be persuaded...Lestock should be pardoned for not fighting, and Mathews cashiered for fighting". His acquittal was largely due to political connections, and Parliament responded in 1749 by enhancing the autonomy of the naval courts. At the same time, Article XII of the "Fighting Instructions" was amended to be far more specific in the penalty for not engaging the enemy, (Note: Every Person in the Fleet, who thro’ Cowardice, Negligence or Disaffection, shall in Time of Action withdrawn, or keep back, or not come into the Fight or Engagement, or shall not do his utmost to take or destroy every Ship which it shall be his Duty to engage, and to assist and relieve all and every of his Majesty's Ships, or those of his Allies, which it shall be his Duty to assist and relieve, every such Person so offending and being convicted thereof by the Sentence of a Court Martial, shall suffer Death.) a change that later resulted in the execution of Admiral Byng.

== Order of battle ==
=== Franco-Spanish ===
Franco-Spanish fleet
| Ship | Rate | Guns | Commander | Notes |
Van
| Borée | Third-rate | 64 | Captain Marqueu | |
| Toulouse | Fourth-rate | 60 | Captain Dárton | |
| Tigre | Fourth-rate | 50 | Captain Saurin | |
| Éole | Third-rate | 64 | Captain Charles d'Albert du Chesne | |
| Alcyon | Fourth-rate | 56 | Captain Lancel | |
| Duc D'Orléans | Third-rate | 68 | Captain Dornés | |
| Espoir | Third-rate | 74 | Captain D'Hericourt (Ensign of Gavaret) | |
Centre
| Trident | Third-rate | 64 | Captain Caylus | |
| Heureux | Fourth-rate | 60 | Captain Gramier | |
| Aquilon | Fourth-rate | 60 | Captain Louis-Philippe de Rigaud, Marquis de Vaudreuil | |
| Solide | Third-rate | 64 | Captain Chateauneuf | |
| Diamant | Fourth-rate | 50 | Captain Claude Louis d'Espinchal, Marquis de Massiac | |
| Ferme | Third-rate | 70 | Captain Gorgues | |
| Terrible | Third-rate | 74 | Vice-Admiral Claude-Élisée de Court de La Bruyère; Captain Jacques-Pierre de Taffanel de la Jonquière, Marquis de la Jonquière | |
| Saint Esprit | Third-rate | 68 | Captain Poison | |
| Sérieux | Third-rate | 64 | Captain Alexandre de Cheylus | |
Rear
| Oriente | Fourth-rate | 60 | Captain Joaquín Manuel de Villena y Guadalfajara | |
| América | Fourth-rate | 60 | Captain Aníbal Petrucci | |
| Neptuno | Fourth-rate | 60 | Captain Enrique Olivares † | |
| Poder | Fourth-rate | 60 | Captain Rodrigo de Urrutia y de la Rosa (POW) | Captured by the British; Recaptured and scuttled by the French |
| Constante | Third-rate | 70 | Captain Agustín de Iturriaga † | Badly damaged and taken under tow |
| Real Felipe | First-rate | 110 | Admiral Juan José Navarro; Captain Nicolas Geraldino † | Badly damaged and taken under tow |
| Hércules | Third-rate | 64 | Captain Cosme Álvarez | |
| Brillante | Fourth-rate | 60 | Captain Blas Clemente de Barreda y Campuzano | |
| Halcón | Fourth-rate | 60 | Captain José Rentería | |
| San Fernando | Third-rate | 64 | Captain Nicolas de la Rosa, Count de Vega Florida | |
| Soberbio | Fourth-rate | 50 | Captain Juan Valdés | |
| Santa Isabel | Third-rate | 80 | Captain Ignacio Dauteville | |

4 frigates
4 fire ships

=== British ===
British Fleet
| Ship | Rate | Guns | Commander | Notes |
Van
| HMS Nassau | Third-rate | 70 | Captain James Lloyd | |
| HMS Chichester | Third-rate | 80 | Captain William Dilkes | Dilkes court-martialled and dismissed, later restored |
| HMS Boyne | Third-rate | 80 | Captain Rowland Frogmore | Frogmore died before being court-martialled |
| HMS Barfleur | Second-rate | 90 | Rear-Admiral William Rowley; Captain Meyrick de L'Angle | Damaged; 25 killed, 20 wounded |
| HMS Ranelagh | Third-rate | 80 | Captain Henry Osborn | |
| HMS Berwick | Third-rate | 70 | Captain Edward Hawke | 17 members of the prize crew taken prisoner when the French recaptured the Poder |
| HMS Stirling Castle | Third-rate | 70 | Captain Thomas Cooper | |
| HMS Bedford | Third-rate | 70 | Captain Hon. George Townshend | |
| HMS Feversham | Fifth-rate | 40 | Captain John Watkins | |
| HMS Winchelsea | Sixth-rate | 20 | Captain William Marsh | |
Centre
| HMS Dragon | Fourth-rate | 60 | Captain Charles Watson | |
| HMS Royal Oak | Third-rate | 70 | Captain Edmund Williams | Williams court-martialled and dismissed |
| HMS Princess | Third-rate | 70 | Captain Robert Pett | Damaged; 8 killed, 20 wounded |
| HMS Somerset | Third-rate | 80 | Captain George Slater | |
| HMS Norfolk | Third-rate | 80 | Captain Hon. John Forbes | Damaged; 12 killed, 25 wounded |
| HMS Marlborough | Second-rate | 90 | Captain James Cornewall † | Badly damaged; 53 killed, 138 wounded |
| HMS Dorsetshire | Third-rate | 80 | Captain George Burrish | Burrish court-martialled and dismissed |
| HMS Essex | Third-rate | 70 | Captain Richard Norris | Norris court-martialled and dismissed |
| HMS Rupert | Third-rate | 60 | Captain John Ambrose | Ambrose court-martialled and suspended for a year |
| HMS Namur (Flagship) | Second-rate | 90 | Admiral Thomas Mathews; Captain John Russell † | Damaged; 8 killed, 20 wounded |
| HMS Dursley Galley | Sixth-rate | 20 | Captain Giles Vanbrugh | |
| HMS Anne Galley | Fire ship | 8 | Commander James Mackie † | Blew up, 25 killed |
| HMS Sutherland | Hospital ship | 18 | Lieutenant Lord Colville | |
Rear
| HMS Salisbury | Fourth-rate | 50 | Captain Peter Osborne | |
| HMS Romney | Fourth-rate | 50 | Captain Henry Godsalve | |
| HMS Dunkirk | Third-rate | 60 | Captain Charles Wager Purvis | |
| HMS Swiftsure | Third-rate | 70 | Captain George Berkeley | |
| HMS Cambridge | Third-rate | 80 | Captain Charles Drummond | |
| HMS Neptune | Second-rate | 90 | Vice-Admiral Richard Lestock; Captain George Stepney | |
| HMS Torbay | Third-rate | 80 | Captain John Gascoigne | |
| HMS Russell | Third-rate | 80 | Captain Robert Long | |
| HMS Buckingham | Third-rate | 70 | Captain John Towry | |
| HMS Elizabeth | Third-rate | 70 | Captain Joshua Lingen | |
| HMS Kingston | Third-rate | 60 | Captain John Lovatt | |
| HMS Oxford | Fourth-rate | 50 | Captain Harry Powlett | |
| HMS Warwick | Third-rate | 60 | Captain Temple West | |
| HMS Mercury | Fire ship | 8 | Commander Moses Peadle | |

== Sources ==
- Allen, Joseph (1842). "Admirals Mathews and Lestock". United Service Magazine.
- Anderson, M.S (1995). The War of the Austrian Succession 1740–1748. Longman. ISBN 978-0582059511.
- Baugh, Daniel (2004). "Mathews, Thomas (1676–1751)". Oxford Dictionary of National Biography (online ed.). Oxford University Press. doi:10.1093/ref:odnb/18332. (Subscription, Wikipedia Library access or UK public library membership required.)
- Beatson, Robert (1788). A political index to the histories of Great Britain and Ireland. J.J. Robinson.
- Black, Jeremy (1998). Britain as a military power 1688–1815. UCL Press. ISBN 978-0-203-17355-8.
- Black, Jeremy (1999). From Louis XIV to Napoleon: The Fate of a Great Power. Routledge. ISBN 978-1857289343.
- Browning, Reed (1995). The War of the Austrian Succession. Griffin. ISBN 978-0312125615.
- Bruce, Anthony (1998). An encyclopedia of naval history. Dearborn Press. ISBN 978-1579581091.
- Dull, Jonathan R (2009). The Age of the Ship of the Line: The British and French Navies, 1650–1815 (Studies in War, Society, and the Military). University of Nebraska Press. ISBN 978-0803219304.
- Harding, Richard (2013). The Emergence of Britain's Global Naval Supremacy: The War of 1739–1748. Boydell Press. ISBN 978-1843838234.
- Lindsay, J.O, ed. (1957). The New Cambridge Modern History, Vol VII; The Old Regime 1713–63. CUP. ISBN 0-521-04545-2.
- Hattendorf, John: Naval policy and strategy in the Mediterranean: past, present, and future. Taylor & Francis, 2000, ISBN 0-7146-8054-0
- Hervey, Frederick (2018) [1779]. The Naval, Commercial, and General History of Great Britain, Volume IV. Creative Media. ISBN 978-1385772720.
- Clowes, W. Laird (1897). The Royal Navy : a history from the earliest times to the present. Vol. III. S. Low, Marston and Company.
- Lecky, William Edward Hartpole (1892). A History of England in the Eighteenth Century. Longmans, Green.
- O'Donnell, Duque de Estrada y Conde de Lucena, Hugo (2004). El primer Marqués de La Victoria, personaje silenciado en la reforma dieciochesca de la Armada (in Spanish). Real Academia de la Historia. ISBN 84-96849-08-2.
- Ware, Chris (2009). Admiral Byng: His Rise and Execution. Pen and Sword Maritime. ISBN 978-1-84415-781-5.
- Wilson, Alastair; Callo, Joseph F (2004). Who's Who in Naval History, From 1550 to the present. Routledge. ISBN 978-0415308281.
