= HMS Somerset (1731) =

1731 Royal Navy third-rate ship of the line

History

Great Britain
- Name: HMS Somerset
- Ordered: 23 December 1725
- Builder: Woolwich Dockyard
- Launched: 21 October 1731
- Honours and awards: Participated in: Battle of Toulon (1744)
- Fate: Broken up, 1746

General characteristics
- Class & type: 1719 Establishment 80-gun third rate ship of the line
- Tons burthen: 1354 bm
- Length: 158 ft (48 m) (gundeck)
- Beam: 44 ft 6 in (13.56 m)
- Depth of hold: 18 ft 2 in (5.54 m)
- Propulsion: Sails
- Sail plan: Full-rigged ship
- Armament: 80 guns: Gundeck: 26 × 32-pdrs; Middle gundeck: 26 × 12-pdrs; Upper gundeck: 24 × 6-pdrs; Quarterdeck: 4 × 6-pdrs

HMS Somerset was an 80-gun third rate ship of the line of the Royal Navy, built to the 1719 Establishment at Woolwich and launched on 21 October 1731. She was the second ship to bear the name.

Lord George Rodney, later to triumph at the Battle of the Saintes in 1782, served on HMS Somerset in 1739 while preparing for his lieutenant's exams. The ship saw action at the Battle of Toulon in 1744. Toulon was an infamous engagement and consequently no battle honour was awarded. A combined Franco-Spanish fleet that had been blockaded in Toulon for two years finally put to sea, led by Admiral de Court de La Bruyère. The blockading British fleet under Admiral Thomas Mathews was roughly the same size as the Franco-Spanish fleet but fearing that the enemy fleet movement was designed to force him out of position and allow a troop convoy to reach Italy, Mathews ordered his fleet to attack before forming up into line. Admiral Richard Lestock, Mathew's second in command, appears to have deliberately misunderstood his orders, and the resulting battle was indecisive, with the British taking more damage than they inflicted. Mathews was dismissed from the Navy for failing to obey permanent fighting instructions for battle.

Somerset was broken up in 1746.
