= Sir Samuel Cornish, 1st Baronet =

Royal Navy officer and politician (1715–1770)

Vice-Admiral Sir Samuel Cornish Bt
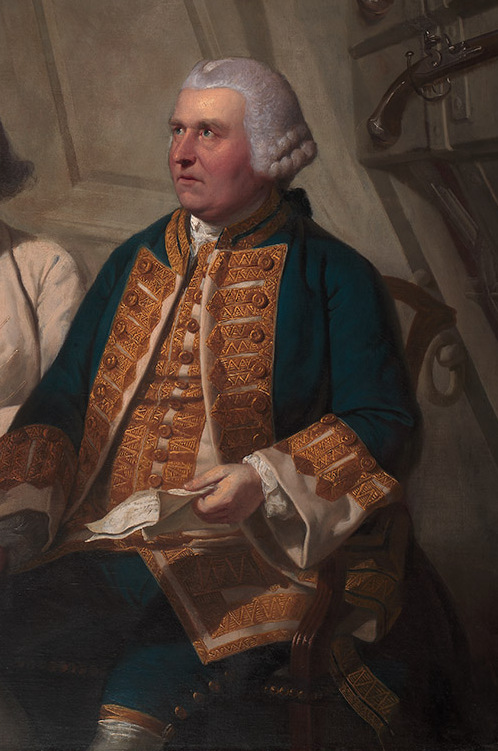
- Portrait by Tilly Kettle, 1768
- Born: c. 1715
- Died: 30 October 1770 (aged c. 64–65)
- Military career
- Allegiance: Great Britain
- Branch: Royal Navy
- Service years: 1728–1770
- Rank: Vice-Admiral of the Red
- Commands: HMS Namur; HMS Guernsey; HMS Stirling Castle; HMS Union; East Indies Station
- Conflicts: War of Jenkins' Ear; Battle of Cartagena de Indias; War of the Austrian Succession; Seven Years' War; Battle of Manila (1762)

Vice-Admiral of the Red Sir Samuel Cornish, 1st Baronet, FRS (c. 1715 – 30 October 1770) was a Royal Navy officer and politician who represented New Shoreham in the House of Commons of Great Britain from 1765 to 1770. He served in the War of Jenkins' Ear, War of the Austrian Succession and Seven Years' War.

== Early career ==
Samuel Cornish was born c. 1715 and joined the Royal Navy in 1728. Having been promoted to lieutenant in 1739, he participated in the Battle of Cartagena de Indias in 1741. In 1742, Cornish was promoted to captain and was appointed as the flag captain of HMS Namur under Vice-admiral Thomas Mathews, serving under him in the Mediterranean. He was given command of HMS Guernsey later that year and commissioned HMS Stirling Castle in 1755. He was elected as a fellow of the Royal Society in 1749. In 1758 Cornish transferred to HMS Union.

== Seven Years' War ==
In 1759 Cornish took part in several battles against the French. When Spain entered the war in early 1762 Cornish was appointed commander of a squadron in India, which, together with a British army under William Draper was ordered to attack Manila. In the Battle of Manila the city was taken after a ten-day siege; the victory made Cornish a rich man. He saw no further service after this battle. He was promoted to Vice-Admiral of the Red in October 1762, represented New Shoreham in the British House of Commons between 1765 and 1770 and was created a baronet in 1766, a title which became extinct upon his death.

In 1765 Cornish purchased Tofte Manor in Sharnbrook, Bedfordshire. He died on 30 October 1770 and left his large fortune to his nephew Captain Samuel Pitchford, who as the captain of HMS America had also taken part in the capture of Manila.

== Legacy ==
The town of Cornish, New Hampshire was named after him. A 1768 portrait of Cornish along with fellow naval officer Richard Kempenfelt and Cornish's secretary Thomas Parry (a future director of the East India Company) by Tilly Kettle went on permanent display at Queen's House in Greenwich in Autumn 2022. The painting had been purchased by the National Maritime Museum with assistance from the Society for Nautical Research.

Parliament of Great Britain
Preceded by The Lord Pollington; The Viscount Midleton	Member of Parliament for New Shoreham; 1765–1770; With: The Lord Pollington 1765–1768; Peregrine Cust 1768–1770	Succeeded by Peregrine Cust; John Purling
Baronetage of Great Britain
New creation	Baronet (of Sharnbrook); 1766–1770	Extinct
Preceded by Knowles baronets	Cornish baronets of Sharnbrook; 1 February 1766	Succeeded by Moore baronets
