= Tartar Group 32-gun ship =

Class overview
- Name: 1693 Programme Group
- Builders: Woolwich Dockyard; Deptford Dockyard; Chatham Dockyard
- Operators: Kingdom of England; Kingdom of Great Britain after 1707
- Preceded by: 1694 Programme Group
- Succeeded by: Milford Group
- Built: 1702–1705
- In service: 1702–1733
- Completed: 3
- Lost: 2
- Retired: 1

General characteristics Specifications
- Type: 32-gun fifth rate
- Tons burthen: 35444/94 tons (bm)
- Length: 108 ft 0 in (32.92 m) gundeck; 90 ft 0 in (27.43 m) keel for tonnage
- Beam: 28 ft 0 in (8.53 m) for tonnage
- Depth of hold: 13 ft 0 in (3.96 m)
- Sail plan: ship-rigged
- Complement: war 145 personnel; peacetime 100 personnel
- Armament: as Built; 4/4 × 4 demi-culverins (LD); 22/20 × sakers (UD); 6/4 × 4 minions (QD)
- Notes: 4-pdr guns removed after 1714

With the ascension of Queen Anne to the throne of England, these would be the first vessels associated to her reign. The vessels would be similar to the previous 1694 programme with one exception. The upper deck battery would be fully enclosed with a deck running from the foc's'le to the quarterdeck. This would protect the gunners and battery during an action with the enemy. In 1702 one vessel was ordered from dockyard. In 1703 two more were ordered from dockyard.

== Design and Specifications ==
Their dimensions would be very similar to the 1664 programme group for 32-gun vessels. The dimensions were a gundeck of 108 feet 0 inches (32.92 metres) with a keel of 90 feet 0 inches (27.43 metres) for tonnage calculation with a breadth of 28 feet 0 inches (8.53 metres) and a depth of hold of 10 feet 9 inches (3.28 metres). Her builder’s measure tonnage was calculated as 4000/94 tons (burthen). Tartar would be rebuilt to the 1719 establishment for 20-gun vessels. The establishment dimensions were 106 feet 0 inches (32.31 metres) with a keel length of 87 feet 9 inches (26.75 metres) for tonnage calculation. The breadth would be 28 feet 4 inches (8.64 metres) with a depth of hold of 9 feet 2 inches (2.79 metres). The tonnage calculation would be 3740/94 tons (bm).

Their crew would be 145 personnel during wartime with 100 personnel required for peacetime. Their guns were established at four/four demi-culverins on the lower deck, twenty-two/twenty 6-pounder guns on the upper deck and six/four 4-pounder guns on the quarterdeck. Later during their service the demi-culverins would be changed out for 12-pounder guns. In 1714 the four pounders would be removed. When the surviving ships were rebuilt as sixth rates in 1720 they would carry only twenty 6-pounder guns on the upper deck.

Ships
Name	Builder	Launch Date	Remarks
Tartar (1702)	Woolwich Dockyard	12 September 1702	Rebuilt as sixth Rate May 1733
Falcon (1704)	Deptford Dockyard	2 December 1704	Taken by French 29 December 1709
Fowey (1705)	Chatham Dockyard	10 March 1705	Taken by French 14 April 1709
