= John Ambrose (Royal Navy officer) =

Royal Navy officer

Rear-Admiral John Ambrose
- Born: c.1705
- Died: 26 March 1771
- Military career
- Allegiance: Kingdom of Great Britain
- Branch: Royal Navy
- Service years: c.1728–1745, 1748–1750
- Rank: Rear-Admiral
- Commands: HMS Greyhound; HMS Rupert
- Conflicts: War of the Austrian Succession; Battle of Toulon

Rear-Admiral John Ambrose (ca. 1705 – 26 March 1771) was an officer of the Royal Navy. He was promoted to post-captain in March 1734, and appointed to HMS Greyhound, in which ship he was employed in the Channel and Mediterranean until September 1740, when he was transferred to the 60-gun HMS Rupert. In this ship he continued for the next eighteen months, carrying out successful cruises against the enemy's privateers on the north coast of Spain, and on the coast of Portugal. He was then sent out to join the Mediterranean Fleet, and was present in the Battle of Toulon on 11 February 1744.

Captain Ambrose was afterwards charged before a court-martial with having neglected his duty on that occasion; with firing and continuing to fire on the enemy whilst altogether out of range, with not having assisted HMS Marlborough when in extreme danger, with not having covered and protected the fire-ship when he might and should have done so, and finally with 'disobedience to His Majesty's instructions and the signals and commands of the admiral, neglect of naval discipline, and being one of the principal causes of the miscarriage of His Majesty's fleet.' The court held these charges to be proved in the principal part; but considering that he had always borne the character of a vigilant and diligent officer, and that his failure in the action was apparently due to a mistake in judgement, his judges sentenced him to be only cashiered during His Majesty's pleasure and to be fined one year's pay, to be given to the chest at Chatham. In 1748 he was restored to his rank and half-pay, and in April 1750 was advanced to be a rear-admiral on the retired list. He died on 26 March 1771.
