= HMS Winchelsea (1740) =

History

Great Britain
- Name: HMS Winchelsea
- Ordered: 13 August 1739
- Builder: Robert Carter, Limehouse
- Laid down: 22 September 1739
- Launched: 3 May 1740
- Commissioned: June 1740
- In service: 1740
- Out of service: 1761
- Fate: Broken up, Portsmouth Dockyard, 1761

General characteristics
- Class & type: 20-gun sixth-rate
- Tons burthen: 440 79/94 bm
- Length: 105 ft 10 in (32.3 m) (gundeck); 87 ft 6 in (26.7 m) (keel)
- Beam: 30 ft 9 in (9.4 m)
- Depth of hold: 9 ft 7 in (2.9 m)
- Sail plan: Full-rigged ship
- Complement: 140
- Armament: 20 × 9-pounder guns

HMS Winchelsea was a 20-gun sixth-rate launched in 1740 and in service during the War of the Austrian Succession in Mediterranean, Atlantic and home waters. She was captured by the French in 1758, but was retaken two weeks later. She was broken up in 1761.

== Career ==
Winchelsea was commissioned in June 1740 under Captain Savage Mostyn. In 1741 Winchelsea, commanded by Captain Essex Holcombe, sailed with Commodore Richard Lestock's squadron to join Admiral Haddock's Mediterranean fleet. At that time she was listed as having 20 guns and a complement of 150 men. While on station, pretending to be a merchant ship, she lured two Spanish privateers to chase her; when they realised their mistake they took off in opposite directions, but Winchelsea captured one of them, a small brig with a crew of 46, which she carried to Gibraltar. She returned to Britain from the Mediterranean at the end of 1742, taking eight days to make the passage.

The ship's barge attempted to press gang sailors from the merchant ship Tarleton on the River Mersey off of Liverpool in 1744. The crew of Tarleton exchanged shots with Winchelsea and evaded capture by docking the ship and dispersing into the town.

The ship was recommissioned in 1745. Winchelsea took the 26-gun French warship Subtile on 19 November 1746.

In 1747 Winchelsea was listed as having 16 guns and, under the command of Captain Dyves, was sailing with Admiral Byng in convoy for Gibraltar.

In 1749, under the command of Thomas Cornish, Winchelsea transported passengers with Edward Cornwallis's expedition to establish Halifax, Nova Scotia.

In March 1756, Winchelsea transported South Carolina's governor Henry William Littleton across the Atlantic from Portsmouth to his colony. The ship finally arrived at Charleston on 1 June. The Winchelsea, based in Charleston, was active in Caribbean waters in December 1756. Under Captain Hale, the ship took two French prizes, and chased a 12-gun French vessel into Cap‑Français. On 10 October, 1758, the ship was sailing off of Ireland when it was captured by the 60-gun French ship Bizarre and the 28-gun Mignonne. The ship was renamed Le Winchelsea under the French but was soon retaken on 27 October by the British privateer Duke of Cornwall.

== Fate ==
Winchelsea was surveyed on 8 July 1761, and by an Admiralty Order of 16 July was broken up at Portsmouth in August of the same year.
