= HMS Stirling Castle (1742) =

Ship of the line of the Royal Navy

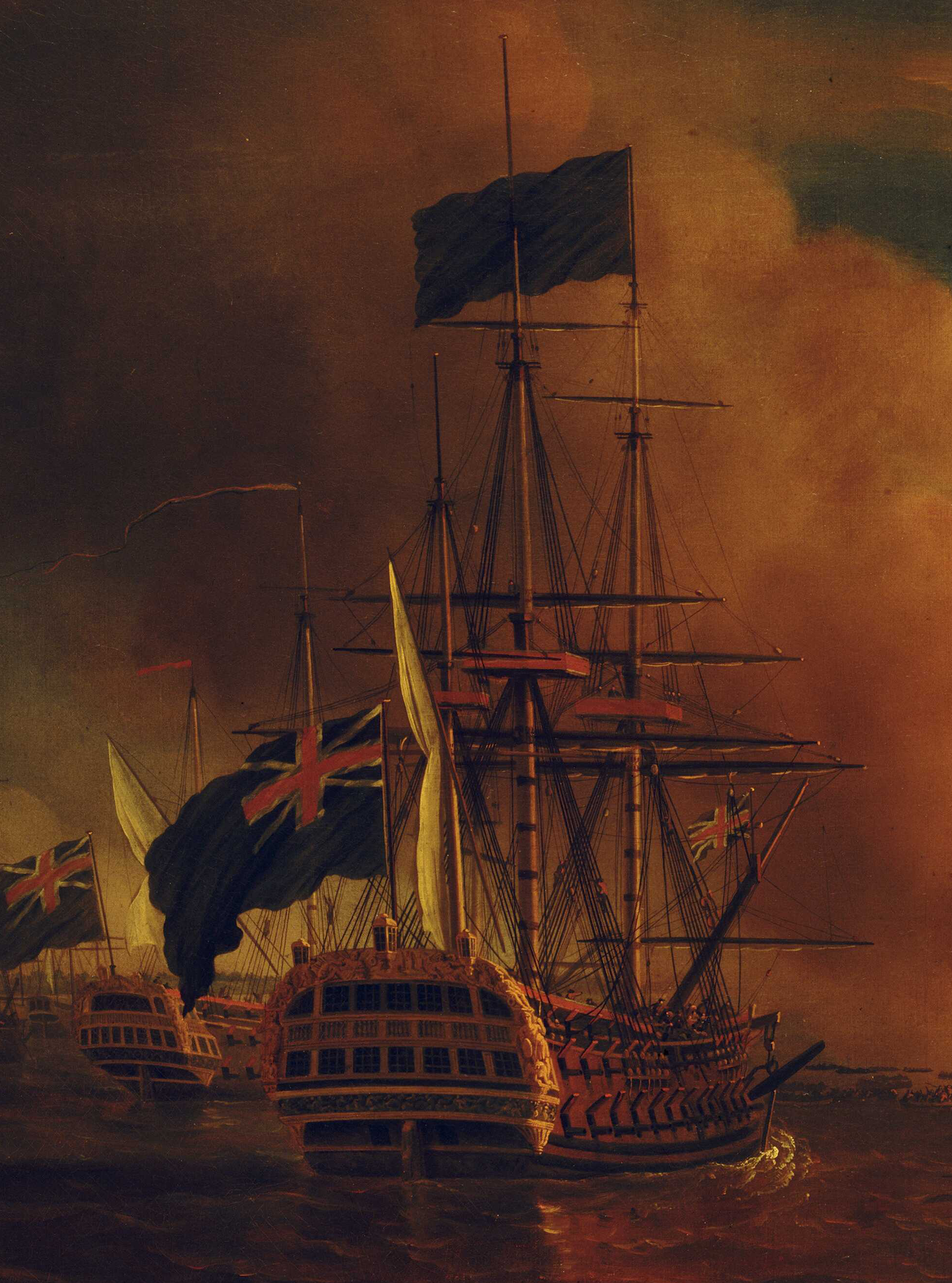
- Stirling Castle at the siege of Quebec

History

Great Britain
- Name: HMS Stirling Castle
- Ordered: 6 August 1739
- Builder: John Ward, Chatham Dockyard
- Laid down: 25 August 1740
- Launched: 24 April 1742
- Completed: 30 May 1742
- Commissioned: May 1742
- Decommissioned: September 1762
- In service: 1742–1747; 1755–1762
- Out of service: 1762
- Fate: Scuttled on 14 September 1762
- Notes: Participated in: Battle of Toulon; Battle of Havana

General characteristics
- Class & type: 1733 proposals 70-gun third rate ship of the line
- Tons burthen: 1225 40/94 bm
- Length: 151 ft (46.0 m) (gundeck); 121 ft 9 in (37.1 m) (keel)
- Beam: 43 ft 6 in (13.3 m)
- Depth of hold: 17 ft 9 in (5.4 m)
- Sail plan: Full-rigged ship
- Complement: 480
- Armament: 1742–1756: 70 guns comprising: Gundeck: 26 × 24-pounder guns; Upper deck: 26 × 12-pounder guns; Quarterdeck: 14 × 6-pounder guns; Forecastle: 4 × 6-pounder guns; 1756–1762; Gundeck: 26 × 24-pounder guns; Upper deck: 26 × 12-pounder guns; Quarterdeck: 10 × 6-pounder guns; Forecastle: 2 × 6-pounder guns

HMS Stirling Castle was a 70-gun third-rate ship of the line of the Royal Navy, built at Chatham Dockyard to the 1733 proposals of the 1719 Establishment, and launched on 24 April 1742.

== Service ==
Whilst under the command of Captain Thomas Cooper, Stirling Castle took part in the Battle of Toulon on 11 February 1744. Stirling Castle was the lead ship in Rear-Admiral William Rowley's van division of Admiral Thomas Mathews' fleet that engaged the France-Spanish fleet. After the battle several officers were court-martialed, including Captain Cooper who appeared on 12 May at Port Mahon, where he was dismissed the service. He was immediately restored to his former rank and command however, as the charges against him were not deemed detrimental to either his professional honour or his ability as a sea officer.

On 15 April 1746, Stirling Castle captured the 24-gun frigate Volage. However, Oriflamme recaptured her the day after.

Stirling Castle was recommissioned in July 1755 under Captain Samuel Cornish, previously of Guernsey. Recruitment proved challenging and Cornish resorting to extensive use of press gangs in order to find enough men. Midshipman Edward Thompson wrote that of the 480 men aboard the vessel fully "two hundred and twenty-five were the pressed refuse of gaols and the scum of the streets."

Despite these difficulties the newly restored vessel was able to return to sea from July 1756, serving as escort to troop transports from London to New York and then to the West Indies.

Stirling Castle took part in the Battle of Havana in 1762. She was subsequently declared unserviceable and was stripped and scuttled in the upper reaches of Havana harbour on 14 September 1762 on the orders of Admiral George Pocock.

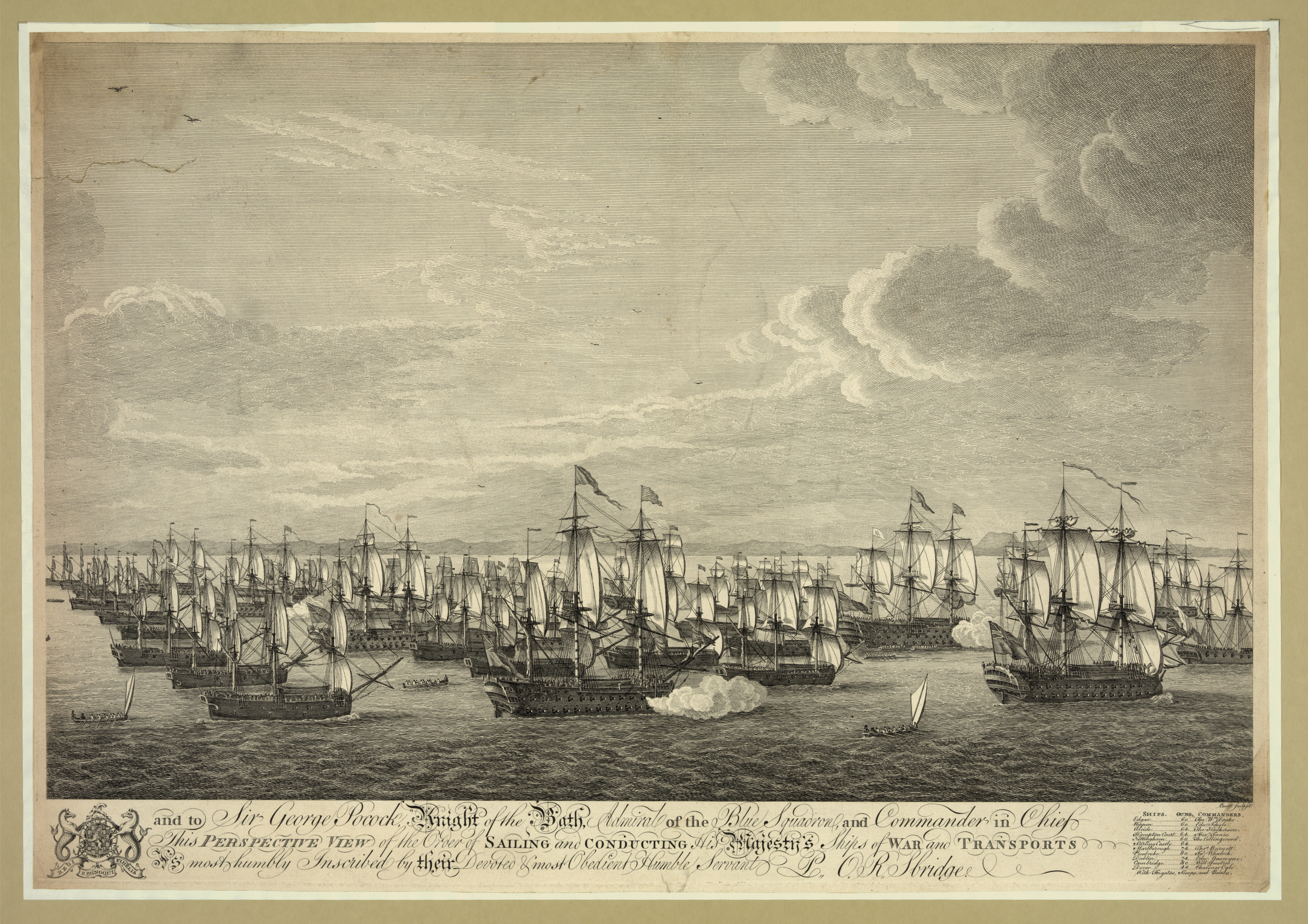
Shown here as a member Sir George Pocock's Blue Squadron, circa 1762

== Bibliography ==
- Phillips, Michael. "Stirling Castle (70) (1742)".
- Roche, Jean-Michel (2005). Dictionnaire des bâtiments de la flotte de guerre française de Colbert à nos jours. Vol. 1. Group Retozel-Maury Millau. pp. 372–373. ISBN 978-2-9525917-0-6. OCLC 165892922.
- Winfield, Rif (2007). British Warships of the Age of Sail 1714–1792: Design, Construction, Careers and Fates. Seaforth. ISBN 9781861762955.
- Rodger, N. A. M. (1986). The Wooden World: An Anatomy of the Georgian Navy. Annapolis, Maryland: Naval Institute Press. ISBN 0870219871.
