= HMS Dragon (1736) =

Ship of the line of the Royal Navy

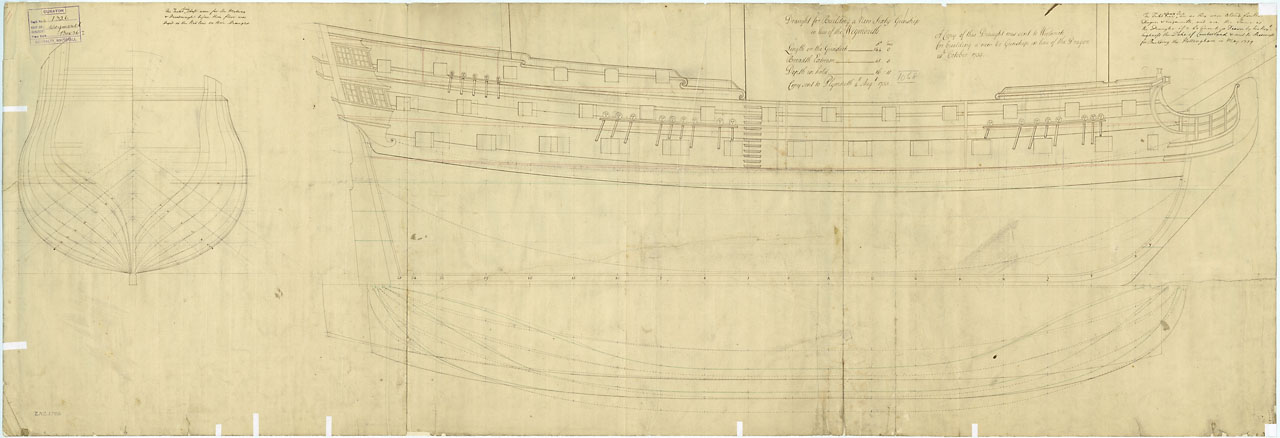
- Dragon

History

Great Britain
- Name: HMS Dragon
- Ordered: 19 October 1733
- Builder: Woolwich Dockyard
- Launched: 11 September 1736
- Fate: Sunk as a breakwater, 1757

General characteristics
- Class & type: 1733 proposals 60-gun fourth rate ship of the line
- Tons burthen: 1067
- Length: 144 ft (43.9 m) (gundeck)
- Beam: 41 ft 5 in (12.6 m)
- Depth of hold: 16 ft 11 in (5.2 m)
- Propulsion: Sails
- Sail plan: Full-rigged ship
- Armament: 60 guns: Gundeck: 24 × 24-pdrs; Upper gundeck: 26 × 9-pdrs; Quarterdeck: 8 × 6-pdrs; Forecastle: 2 × 6-pdrs

HMS Dragon was a 60-gun fourth rate ship of the line of the Royal Navy, built to the 1733 proposals of the 1719 Establishment at Woolwich Dockyard, and launched on 11 September 1736.

In February 1744, she took part in the Battle of Toulon.

Dragon was sunk in 1757 to form part of a breakwater.
