= HMS Namur (1697) =

Ship of the line of the Royal Navy

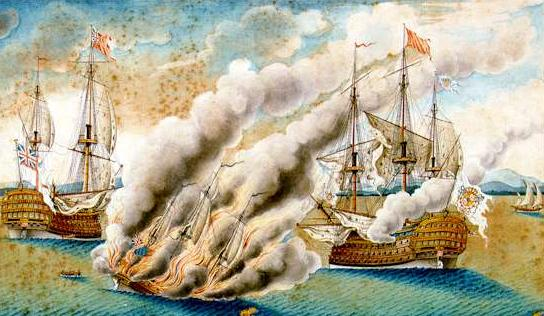
- HMS Namur (left) at the Battle of Toulon in 1744

History

Great Britain
- Name: HMS Namur
- Ordered: 1695
- Builder: Lawrence, Woolwich Dockyard
- Launched: 1697
- Fate: Wrecked, 1749

General characteristics as built
- Class & type: 90-gun second rate ship of the line
- Tons burthen: 1,442 6/94 (bm)
- Length: 160 ft 9 in (49.0 m) (gundeck)
- Beam: 45 ft 8 in (13.9 m)
- Depth of hold: 18 ft 6 in (5.6 m)
- Propulsion: Sails
- Sail plan: Full-rigged ship
- Armament: 24 demi-cannon; 28 culverins; 38 sakers

General characteristics after 1729 rebuild
- Class & type: 1719 Establishment 90-gun second rate ship of the line
- Tons burthen: 1,566 89/94 (bm)
- Length: 142 ft 10.5 in (43.5 m) (gundeck)
- Beam: 38 ft 1 in (11.6 m)
- Depth of hold: 15 ft 9 in (4.8 m)
- Propulsion: Sails
- Sail plan: Full-rigged ship
- Armament: 90 guns: Gundeck: 26 × 32 pdrs; Middle gundeck: 26 × 18 pdrs; Upper gundeck: 26 × 9 pdrs; Quarterdeck: 10 × 6 pdrs; Forecastle: 2 × 6 pdrs

HMS Namur was a 90-gun second rate ship of the line of the Royal Navy, launched at Woolwich Dockyard in 1697.

On 11 June 1723 she was ordered to be taken to pieces at Portsmouth and her timbers transferred to Deptford Dockyard. In 1729 the timbers were used to rebuild the ship according to the 1719 Establishment.

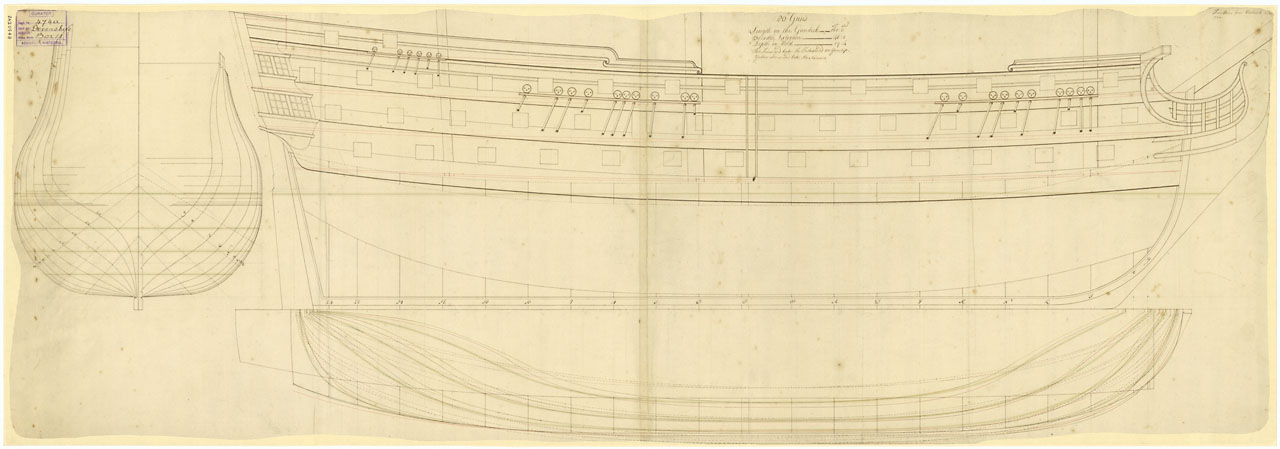
Plan for the Namur 1745 Establishment

She was rebuilt by Richard Stacey at Deptford Dockyard and relaunched on 13 September 1729. In 1745, she was razeed to 74 guns.

In February 1744 she took part in the Battle of Toulon.

Namur was wrecked on 14 April 1749 in a storm near Fort St David on the east coast of India. In total, 520 of her crew were drowned, though Captain Marshal survived.

== Commanders of Note ==
- Edward Falkingham 1731/2
- George Clinton 1732 to 1734
- John Barnsley
- Thomas Whitney
- Samuel Faulknor
- Samuel Cornish
- George Berkeley

== Flagship of ==
- Admiral Charles Wager
- Rear Admiral Nicholas Haddock
- Admiral John Norris
- Vice Admiral Thomas Mathews
