= HMS Berwick (1743) =

Ship of the line of the Royal Navy

- Berwick

History

Great Britain
- Name: HMS Berwick
- Ordered: 5 December 1740
- Builder: Deptford Dockyard
- Launched: 13 June 1743
- Fate: Broken up, 1760

General characteristics
- Class & type: 1733 proposals 70-gun third-rate ship of the line
- Tons burthen: 1280
- Length: 151 ft (46.0 m) (gundeck)
- Beam: 43 ft 5 in (13.2 m)
- Depth of hold: 17 ft 9 in (5.4 m)
- Propulsion: Sails
- Sail plan: Full-rigged ship
- Armament: 70 guns: Gundeck: 26 × 24-pounders; Upper gundeck: 26 × 12-pounders; Quarterdeck: 14 × 6-pounders; Forecastle: 4 × 6-pounders

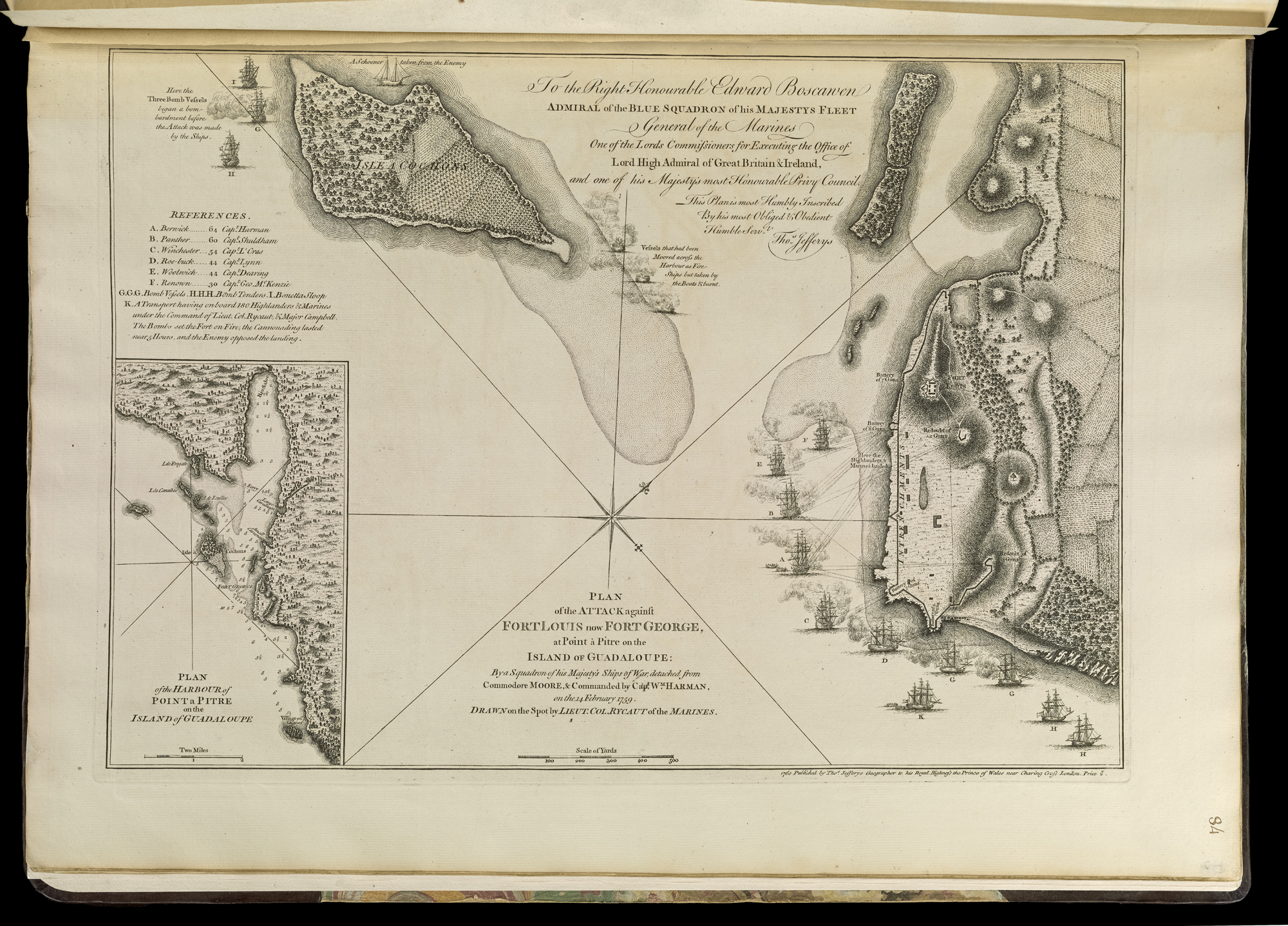
Plan of the attack against Fort Louis now Fort George, at Point à Pitre by a squadron, detached from Commodore Moore and commanded by Captain Wm. Harman of Berwick on 14 February 1759

HMS Berwick was a 70-gun third-rate ship of the line of the Royal Navy, built by Joseph Allin the younger to the 1733 proposals of the 1719 Establishment at Deptford Dockyard, and launched on 13 June 1743. It participated in the Battle of Toulon on 22–23 February 1744 under the command of Sir Edward Hawke.

She was a part of the attack on Guadeloupe against Fort Louis (now Fort George), at Point à Pitre by a squadron, detached from Commodore Moore and commanded by Captain Wm. Harman of Berwick on 14 February 1759.

Berwick was broken up in 1760.
