= HMS Cambridge (1695) =

British naval ship

History

Great Britain
- Name: HMS Cambridge
- Builder: Harding, Deptford Dockyard
- Launched: 21 December 1695
- Fate: Broken up, 1749

General characteristics as built
- Class & type: 80-gun third rate ship of the line
- Tons burthen: 1,194
- Length: 156 ft (47.5 m) (gundeck)
- Beam: 41 ft 11.5 in (12.8 m)
- Depth of hold: 17 ft (5.2 m)
- Propulsion: Sails
- Sail plan: Full-rigged ship
- Armament: 80 guns of various weights of shot

General characteristics after 1715 rebuild
- Class & type: 1706 Establishment 80-gun third rate ship of the line
- Tons burthen: 1,286
- Length: 156 ft (47.5 m) (gundeck)
- Beam: 43 ft 6 in (13.3 m)
- Depth of hold: 17 ft 8 in (5.4 m)
- Propulsion: Sails
- Sail plan: Full-rigged ship
- Armament: 80 guns: Gundeck: 26 × 32 pdrs; Middle gundeck: 26 × 12 pdrs; Upper gundeck: 24 × 6 pdrs; Quarterdeck: 4 × 6 pdrs

HMS Cambridge was an 80-gun third rate ship of the line of the Royal Navy, launched at Deptford Dockyard on 21 December 1695. A combination of poor sailing qualities and a top-heavy structure kept her in reserve for many years. Finally brought into active service during the War of Jenkins' Ear, she played an undistinguished part in Sir John Norris' 1740 expedition to the Bay of Biscay, and at the Battle of Toulon in 1744.

From 1746 to 1748 she was again removed from service while consideration was given to rebuilding her with fewer guns. The investigation was inconclusive, and Cambridge was broken up at Chatham Dockyard in 1750.

== Construction ==
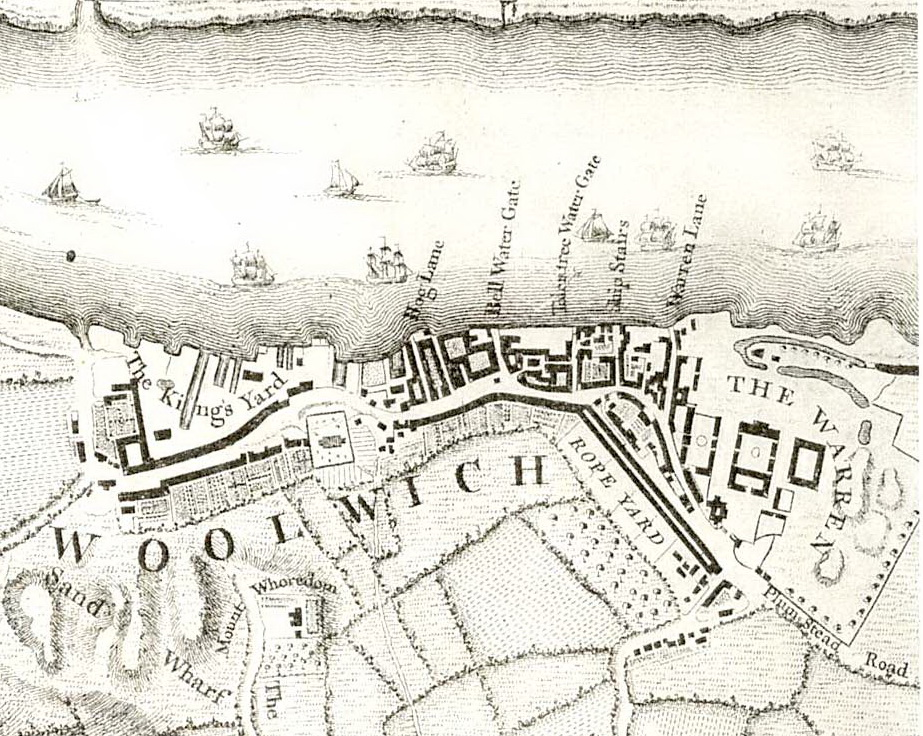
Woolwich Dockyard, where Cambridge was rebuilt in 1713–15. From a 1740s engraving by Richard Parr.

Cambridge was constructed in 1695 as part of a program in experimental ship design. In 1690, Admiral Arthur Torrington advised the British Parliament that France was expanding its fleet and that the Royal Navy would soon be outgunned. In response the Parliament approved construction of a new generation of ships each carrying 80 guns instead of the traditional 74. Cambridge was one such vessel, built with the traditional two full-length gun decks of a 74-gun ship but topped with an additional half-length deck to increase her armament.

There were too flaws in Cambridge's design, which became apparent after launch. First, the weight of the additional half deck so increased her draught that her lower gun ports were at the waterline and opening them risked shipping a large quantity of seawater into the hull. Shifting the lower deck guns to the middle and upper decks accentuated the second flaw, which was a high centre of gravity that made Cambridge top-heavy and likely to heel over in strong winds.

To address these concerns, Cambridge was rebuilt at Woolwich Dockyard in 1713 according to the 1706 Establishment, with a slightly wider hull, heavier lower deck armament and a full upper deck to enable a more even distribution of guns. The work was overseen by shipwright Jacob Acworth, as one of his first duties as Surveyor of the Navy from April 1715. Acworth's design also lowered the mast yards almost to the level of the deck, in an effort to address the top-heaviness of her earlier design.

The keel of the rebuilt vessel was laid on 30 August 1713, but construction was slow and the ship was not launched until two years later, on 17 September 1715. As rebuilt, her dimensions were in keeping with other vessels of the Establishment. Her overall length was 156 ft 1 in (47.6 m) with a lower gundeck of 126 ft 0 in (38.4 m), a broad beam of 43 ft 8 in (13.3 m), hold depth of 17 ft 8.5 in (5.4 m) and measuring 1286 33/94 tons burthen. Rebuilding costs were £17,117 including fittings.

Her peacetime complement was set at 360 men, rising to a nominal 520 in war. The number of guns was unchanged from 1695, but their weight was increased. Twenty-six 32-pounder cannons were installed in her lower deck, with twenty-six 18-pounders in the middle deck and twenty-two 6-pounder guns in the newly built upper deck. Another six 6-pounders were fitted along the quarterdeck to make up the 80-gun arsenal.

== Naval service ==
In 1739 Britain declared war on Spain, and a degree of mobilisation was required in order to man the fleet. To this end, Cambridge was sent to the Irish coast to assist with impressment of landsmen into Navy service. The operation was a success but the quality of recruits was poor. On reviewing one band of press-ganged men, Admiral Philip Cavendish noted, "Cambridge's two lieutenants ... have brought from Dublin seventy or eighty people - all boys, broken tradesmen, diseased landsmen and so on - that I can't pick ten out of the whole number fit to be sent aboard."

Relieved of impressment duty in 1740, Cambridge was instead assigned to a fleet being raised under the command of Sir John Norris at Portsmouth. Norris' fleet was intended to cruise the Bay of Biscay in search of Spanish warships, but its departure was delayed by a chronic shortage of crew. Cambridge finally sailed with the fleet on 20 July. Six days later, heavy winds and rain forced the fleet back to the port of Torbay, where it remained for six weeks. Fever had broken out, and Cambridge was among the worst affected. On 1 September Cambridge's lieutenants and warrant officers reported that 131 crew were too diseased to work, and that the remaining 30 healthy men were too few to sail the ship. The lieutenants also noted that these healthy men were all impressed landsmen with no useful skills, describing them as "raw and unskilled sailors, the very worst that any of us were ever at sea with." With similar reports received from other vessels, the fleet's objectives were abandoned and Cambridge was returned to Spithead.

Cambridge was broken up in 1750.

== Bibliography ==
- Baugh, Daniel A. (1965). British Naval Administration in the Age of Walpole. Princeton University Press. OCLC 729683642.
- Lavery, Brian (1983). The Ship of the Line, Volume One: The Development of the Battlefleet 1650-1850. Conway Maritime Press. ISBN 0851772528.
- Winfield, Rif (2007). British Warships of the Age of Sail 1714–1792: Design, Construction, Careers and Fates. Seaforth. ISBN 9781844157006.
- Winfield, Rif (2009). British Warships of the Age of Sail 1603–1714: Design, Construction, Careers and Fates. Seaforth. ISBN 9781848320406.
