= HMS Romney (1708) =

Ship of the line of the Royal Navy

History

Great Britain
- Name: HMS Romney
- Builder: Allin, Deptford Dockyard
- Launched: 2 December 1708
- Fate: Sold, 1757

General characteristics as built
- Class & type: 1706 Establishment 50-gun fourth rate ship of the line
- Tons burthen: 710
- Length: 130 ft (39.6 m) (gundeck)
- Beam: 35 ft (10.7 m)
- Depth of hold: 14 ft (4.3 m)
- Propulsion: Sails
- Sail plan: Full-rigged ship
- Armament: 50 guns: Gundeck: 22 × 18-pdrs; Upper gundeck: 22 × 9-pdrs; Quarterdeck: 4 × 6-pdrs; Forecastle: 2 × 6-pdrs

General characteristics after 1726 rebuild
- Class & type: 1719 Establishment 50-gun fourth rate ship of the line
- Tons burthen: 756
- Length: 134 ft (40.8 m) (gundeck)
- Beam: 36 ft (11.0 m)
- Depth of hold: 15 ft 2 in (4.6 m)
- Propulsion: Sails
- Sail plan: Full-rigged ship
- Armament: 50 guns: Gundeck: 22 × 18-pdrs; Upper gundeck: 22 × 9-pdrs; Quarterdeck: 4 × 6-pdrs; Forecastle: 2 × 6-pdrs

HMS Romney was a 50-gun fourth rate ship of the line of the Royal Navy, built by Sir Joseph Allin to the 1706 Establishment at Deptford Dockyard, and launched on 2 December 1708.

On 11 June 1723 orders were issued for Romney to be taken to pieces and rebuilt at Deptford according to the 1719 Establishment, and she was relaunched on 17 October 1726.

Romney was sold out of the navy in 1757.
