= HMS Bedford (1698) =

Royal Navy third rate ship of the line

- Plan of the 1741 rebuild of Bedford

History

Great Britain
- Name: HMS Bedford
- Ordered: 24 December 1695
- Builder: Fisher Harding, Woolwich Dockyard
- Launched: 12 September 1698
- Fate: Sold, 1787

General characteristics as built
- Class & type: 70-gun third rate ship of the line
- Tons burthen: 1073
- Length: 151 ft (46.0 m) (gundeck)
- Beam: 40 ft 4 in (12.3 m)
- Depth of hold: 16 ft 9 in (5.1 m)
- Propulsion: Sails
- Sail plan: Full-rigged ship
- Armament: 70 guns as set out in the article

General characteristics after 1741 rebuild
- Class & type: 1733 proposals 70-gun third rate ship of the line
- Tons burthen: 1230
- Length: 151 ft (46.0 m) (gundeck)
- Beam: 43 ft 5 in (13.2 m)
- Depth of hold: 17 ft 9 in (5.4 m)
- Propulsion: Sails
- Sail plan: Full-rigged ship
- Armament: 70 guns: Gundeck: 26 × 24-pounders; Upper gundeck: 26 × 12-pounders; Quarterdeck: 14 × 6-pounders; Forecastle: 4 × 6-pounders

HMS Bedford was a 70-gun third rate ship of the line of the Royal Navy, launched at Woolwich Dockyard on 12 September 1698. She carried twenty-two 24-pounder guns and four (18-pounder) culverins on the lower deck; twenty-six 12-pounder guns on the upper deck; fourteen (5-pounder) sakers on the quarterdeck and forecastle; and four 3-pounder guns on the poop or roundhouse.

On 8 October 1736 Bedford was ordered to be taken to pieces and rebuilt by Joseph Allin the younger according to the 1733 proposals of the 1719 Establishment at Portsmouth, from where she was relaunched on 9 March 1741.

Bedford was hulked in 1767, and served in this capacity until 1787, when she was sold out of the navy.
