= HMS Chichester (1695) =

Ship of the line of the Royal Navy

History

Great Britain
- Name: HMS Chichester
- Builder: Lee, Chatham Dockyard
- Launched: 6 March 1695
- Fate: Broken up, 1749

General characteristics as built
- Class & type: 80-gun third rate ship of the line
- Tons burthen: 1210 bm
- Length: 157 ft 3 in (47.9 m) (gundeck)
- Beam: 41 ft 9.5 in (12.7 m)
- Depth of hold: 17 ft (5.2 m)
- Propulsion: Sails
- Sail plan: Full-rigged ship
- Armament: 80 guns of various weights of shot

General characteristics after 1706 rebuild
- Class & type: 80-gun third rate ship of the line
- Tons burthen: 1278 bm
- Length: 155 ft 6 in (47.4 m) (gundeck)
- Beam: 43 ft 5 in (13.2 m)
- Depth of hold: 17 ft 10 in (5.4 m)
- Propulsion: Sails
- Sail plan: Full-rigged ship
- Armament: 80 guns of various weights of shot

HMS Chichester was an 80-gun third rate ship of the line of the Royal Navy, launched at Chatham Dockyard on 6 March 1695.

She underwent a rebuild in 1706 at Woolwich Dockyard. Chichester served until 1749, when she was broken up.

Tobias Smollett, later to become a well-known writer, served as a naval surgeon on the Chichester.
