= HMS Fowey (1705) =

English 32-gun fifth rate warship (1703/05–1709)

History

England
- Name: HMS Fowey
- Ordered: 16 March 1703
- Builder: Chatham Dockyard
- Launched: 10 March 1705
- Commissioned: 1705
- Captured: 14 April 1709
- Fate: Taken by two French 40-gun ships off Cape Gato, Spain

General characteristics as built
- Class & type: 32-gun fifth rate
- Tons burthen: 41192/94 tons (bm)
- Length: 108 ft 5 in (33.05 m) gundeck; 89 ft 0 in (27.13 m) keel for tonnage
- Beam: 29 ft 6 in (8.99 m)
- Depth of hold: 13 ft 0 in (3.96 m)
- Propulsion: Sails
- Sail plan: Full-rigged ship
- Complement: 145/110
- Armament: as built 32 guns; 4/4 × demi-culverins (LD); 22/20 × 6-pdr guns (UD); 6/4 × 4-pdr guns (QD)
- Notes: the demi-culverins would be changed for 12-pdr guns later

HMS Fowey was a 32-gun fifth rate built at Chatham Dockyard in 1703/05. She spent her career in the Mediterranean and was taken by the French off Cape Gato, Spain in April 1709.

She was the second named vessel since it was used for a 32-gun fifth rate built by Burgess & Briggs of Shoreham and taken by the French off the Scilly Islands on 1 August 1704.

== Construction and specifications ==
She was ordered on 16 March 1703 to be built at Chatham Dockyard under the guidance of Master Shipwright Robert Shortiss. She was launched on 10 March 1705. Her dimensions were a gundeck of 108 feet 0 inches (32.92 metres) with a keel of 89 feet 0 inches (27.13 metres) for tonnage calculation with a breadth of 29 feet 6 inches (8.99 metres) and a depth of hold of 13 feet 0 inches (3.96 metres). Her builder's measure tonnage was calculated as 41192/94 tons (burthen).

The gun armament initially was four demi-culverins (Note: A demi-culverin was a gun of 3,400 pounds with a four-inch bore firing a 9.5-pound shot with an eight-pound powder charge) on the lower deck (LD) with two pair of guns per side. The upper deck (UD) battery would consist of between twenty and twenty-two 6-pounder guns (Note: A 6-pounder was a Dutch gun used to replace the saker) with ten or eleven guns per side. The gun battery would be completed by four 4-pounder guns (Note: A minion renamed the 4-pounder was a gun of 1,000 pounds with a 3.5-inch bore firing a 4-pound shot with a 4-pound powder charge.) on the quarterdeck (QD) with two to three guns per side.

== Commissioned Service 1705-1709 ==
She was commissioned in 1705 under the command of Captain Charles Parsons for service in the Mediterranean. Captain Parsons was killed on the 11 February 1706. Captain Richard Lestock took command on 29 April 1706 and she sailed for Home Waters in September 1706. She returned to the Mediterranean to join Admiral John Leake's Fleet during the winter of 1707/08.

== Loss ==
She was taken by two French 40-gun vessels of Capr Gato, Spain on 14 April 1709.
