= HMS Barfleur (1697) =

Ship of the line of the Royal Navy

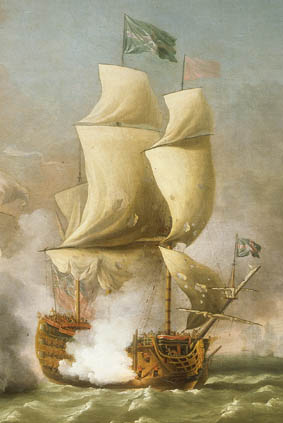
- Barfleur

History

Great Britain
- Name: HMS Barfleur
- Ordered: 1695
- Builder: Harding, Deptford Dockyard
- Launched: 10 August 1697
- Fate: Broken up, 1783

General characteristics as built
- Class & type: 90-gun second-rate ship of the line
- Tons burthen: 1476
- Length: 162 ft 10.5 in (49.6 m) (gundeck)
- Beam: 46 ft 4 in (14.1 m)
- Depth of hold: 18 ft 2.25 in (5.5 m)
- Propulsion: Sails
- Sail plan: Full-rigged ship
- Armament: 90 guns of various weights of shot

General characteristics after 1716 rebuild
- Class & type: 1706 Establishment 90-gun second-rate ship of the line
- Tons burthen: 1564.6
- Length: 163 ft (49.7 m) (gundeck); 131 ft 9 in (40.2 m) (keel)
- Beam: 47 ft 3 in (14.4 m)
- Depth of hold: 18 ft 6 in (5.6 m)
- Propulsion: Sails
- Sail plan: Full-rigged ship
- Armament: 90 guns: Gundeck: 26 × 32-pounders; Middle gundeck: 26 × 18-pounders; Upper gundeck: 26 × 9-pounders; Quarterdeck: 10 × 6-pounders; Forecastle: 2 × 6-pounders

HMS Barfleur was a 90-gun second rate ship of the line of the Royal Navy, launched at Deptford Dockyard on 10 August 1697.

She was rebuilt according to the 1706 Establishment at Deptford, relaunching on 27 June 1716.

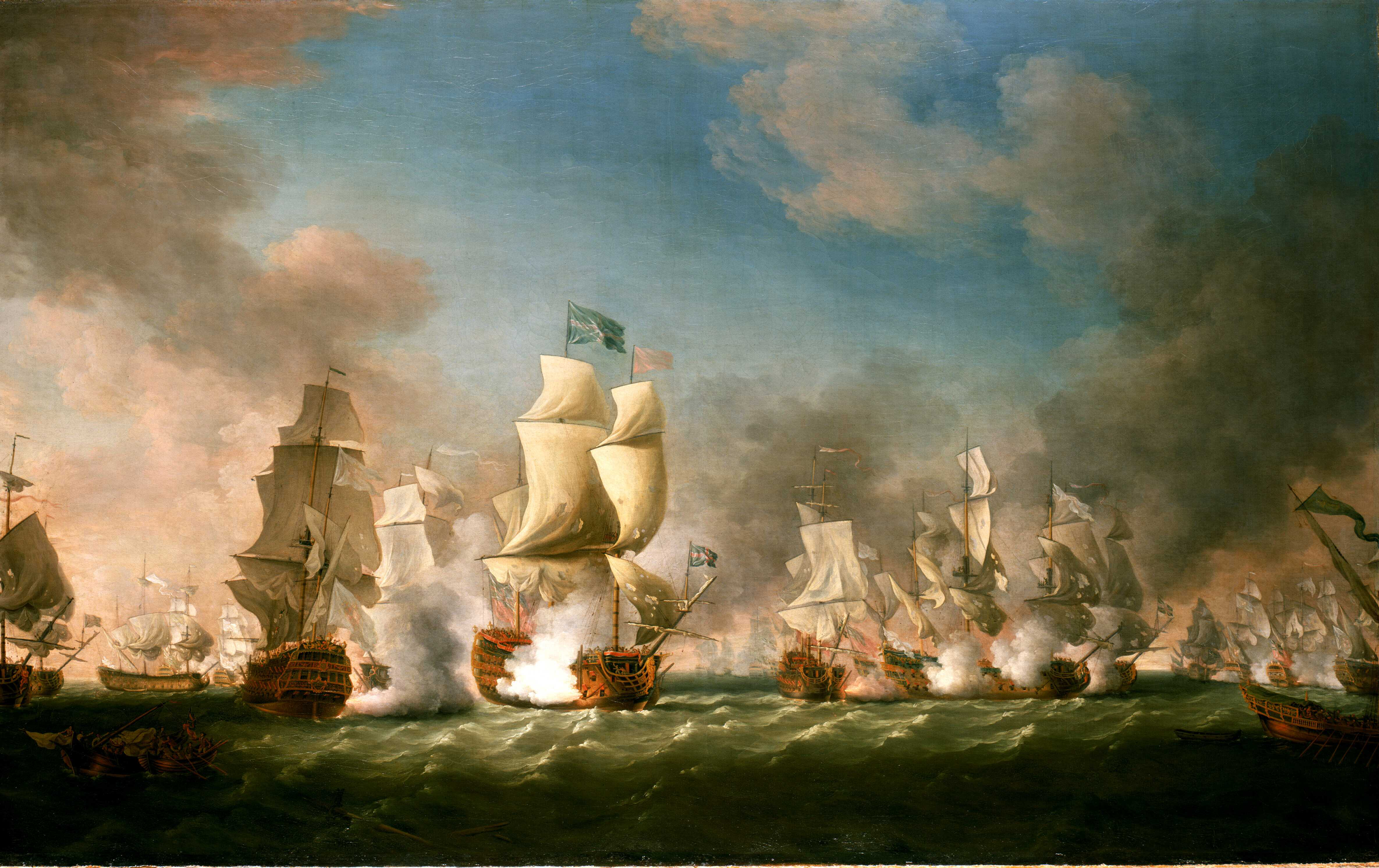
The Battle of Cape Passaro

She took part in the Battle of Cape Passaro in 1719, and then served during the War of 1739–48, including the Battle of Toulon (1744), before being paid off in 1745. However, the Barfleur was reduced to an 80-gun third rate in 1755 and served throughout the Seven Years' War, prior to being hulked in 1764, and eventually broken up in 1783.
