= HMS Nassau (1699) =

Ship of the line of the Royal Navy

History

England
- Name: HMS Nassau
- Ordered: 1695
- Builder: Waffe, Portsmouth Dockyard
- Launched: 2 August 1699
- Fate: Wrecked, 30 October 1706

General characteristics
- Class & type: 70-gun third rate ship of the line
- Tons burthen: 1080
- Length: 150 ft 9 in (45.9 m) (gundeck)
- Beam: 40 ft (12.2 m)
- Depth of hold: 17 ft 2 in (5.2 m)
- Propulsion: Sails
- Sail plan: Full-rigged ship
- Armament: 70 guns of various weights of shot

HMS Nassau was a 70-gun third rate ship of the line of the English Royal Navy, launched at Portsmouth Dockyard on 2 August 1699.

The ship, with a crew of at least 440 officers and men and under the command of Captain Dove, formed part of the Anglo-Dutch fleet which captured Gibraltar on 4 August 1704 (War of the Spanish Succession).

Nassau was wrecked on 30 October 1706.
