= Claude-Élisée de Court de La Bruyère =

French Navy officer (1666-1752)

Claude-Élisée de Court de La Bruyère (February 15, 1666 – August 19, 1752) was a French officer in the French Navy during the reigns of Louis XIV and Louis XV, who ended his career as Vice Admiral of the Flotte du Ponant.

== Life ==
He was the son of Charles de Court and Anne de Saumaise. He became a garde-marine in 1684, and fought in all major naval battles between 1689 and 1744.
As Lieutenant de Vaisseau of the Parfait (64), he fought in the Battle of Beachy Head (1690). He was also present in the Battle of Lagos (1693) on board the Agréable.

His greatest victory was the Battle of Toulon (1744), when he was already 78 years old.

== Sources ==
Les officiers généraux de la marine royale (1715-1774), Librairie de l'Inde, 1990, 383 p. (ISBN 2905455047), p. 59 and following. Michel Vergé-Franceschi.
