= Thomas Mathews =

Royal Navy officer (1676–1751)

Admiral Thomas Mathews
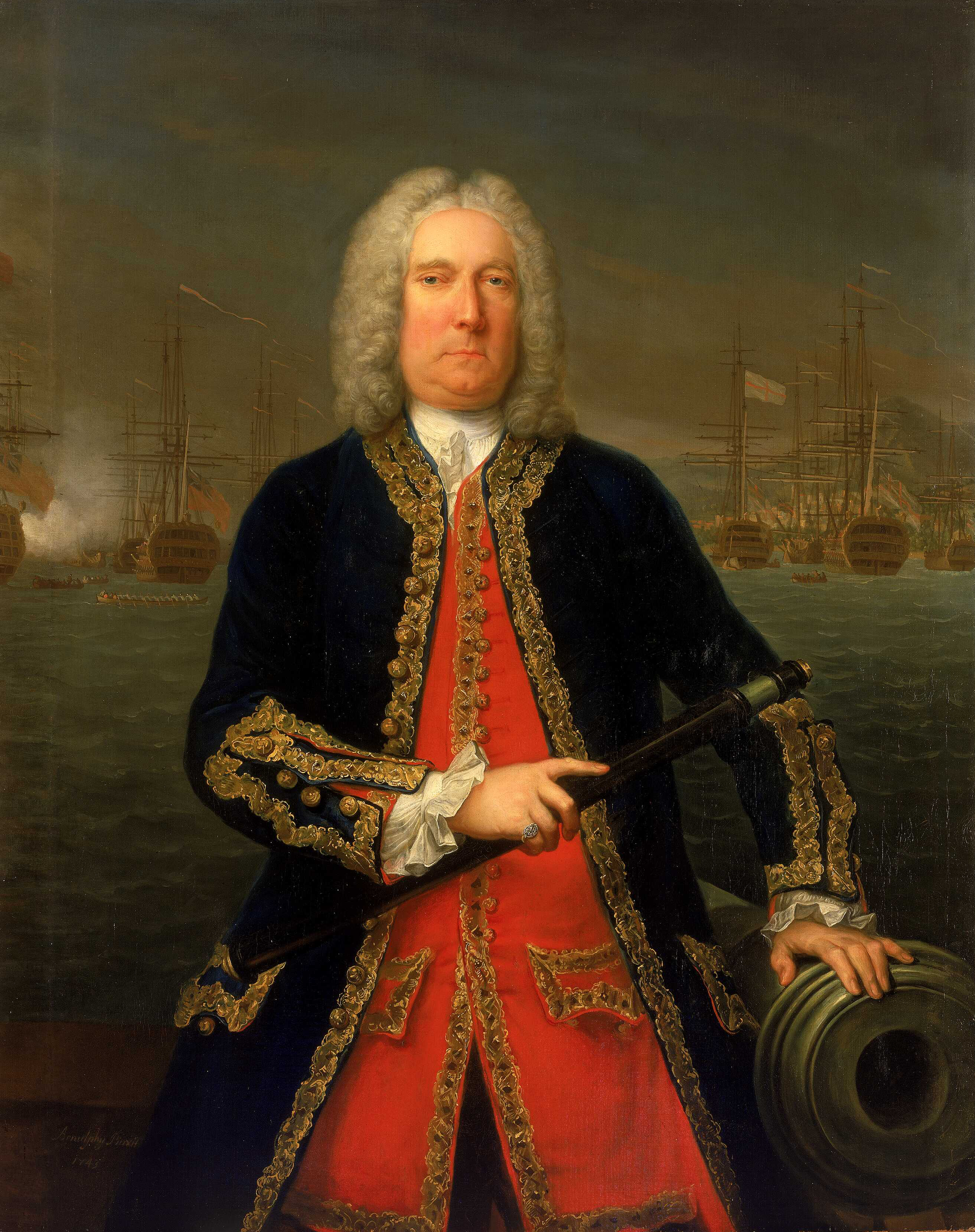
- Portrait by Claude Arnulphy, 1743
- Born: October 1676; Llandaff Court, Llandaff
- Died: 2 October 1751 (aged 74–75); Bloomsbury Square, London
- Military career
- Allegiance: England; Great Britain
- Branch: Royal Navy
- Service years: 1690–1747
- Rank: Admiral of the Blue
- Commands: HMS Yarmouth; HMS Kingsale; HMS Gloucester; HMS Chester; HMS Prince Frederick; HMS Kent
- Conflicts: Nine Years' War; Battle of Barfleur; War of the Spanish Succession; War of the Quadruple Alliance; Battle of Cape Passaro; War of the Austrian Succession; Battle of Toulon (1744)

Admiral of the Blue Thomas Mathews (October 1676 – 2 October 1751) was a Royal Navy officer. He joined the navy in 1690 and saw service on a number of ships, including during the Nine Years' War and the War of the Spanish Succession. He interspersed periods spent commanding ships with time at home at the family estate in Llandaff. He distinguished himself with service with Sir George Byng at the Battle of Cape Passaro in 1718, and went on to command squadrons in the Mediterranean and Indian Ocean, before largely retiring from naval service.

Mathews returned to active service in 1741, following Britain's entry to the War of the Austrian Succession, and took command of the fleet in the Mediterranean. The usual difficulties of performing delicate diplomatic duties were further exacerbated by the fact that he was on bad terms with his second in command, Richard Lestock, on whom he relied to manage the fleet. The pivotal moment of his naval career came in 1744, when he attempted to intercept a Franco-Spanish fleet at the Battle of Toulon. The action was fought in confused circumstances, with poor communications and the breakdown of the chain of command. Despite possessing the superior force, Mathews was unable to secure a decisive result, and the enemy were able to escape with the loss of one ship, while Mathews's fleet lost one and had several others badly damaged.

The failure to secure a victory incensed the British public, and a series of courts-martial and a public inquiry led to several officers being cashiered. Mathews' second in command, Lestock, was tried but acquitted, blaming the outcome on Mathews' poor planning and ill-tempered and unwise attack. Mathews was tried and convicted of the charges, and dismissed from the navy. He returned to his estates at Llandaff, before moving to London and dying there in 1751.

== Family and early life ==
He was born at Llandaff Court, Llandaff, the son of Colonel Edward Mathews (died 1700), and grandson on his mother's side of Sir Thomas Armstrong (1624–1684) (who was executed in 1684, for his part in the Rye House Plot). Mathews was also a descendant of the Welsh knight Sir David ap Mathew and King Louis VI of France. Mathews joined the navy in 1690, serving aboard HMS Albemarle, which was then under the command of his uncle, Sir Francis Wheler. Mathews served during the Nine Years' War, he may have been present at the Battle of Beachy Head, and was likely in action at the Battle of Barfleur. Mathews went on to serve aboard HMS Portland under Captain James Littleton in 1697, and on 31 October 1699 Vice-Admiral Matthew Aylmer appointed him lieutenant aboard his flagship, HMS Boyne. Mathews served with Aylmer in the Mediterranean, before being moved to HMS Deale Castle in 1700. Mathews went on to serve with John Graydon in the West Indies, being promoted by him to command HMS Yarmouth, a position he took up on 24 May 1703.

== Command ==
He commanded HMS Kingsale in the English Channel from 1704, and in October 1708 took command of HMS Gloucester. His next ship was the newly built HMS Chester, which was attached to the Channel fleet under Lord Berkeley. The fleet encountered a small French squadron under René Duguay-Trouin in early 1709. The British gave chase, re-capturing one of Duguay-Trouin's prizes, HMS Bristol, and capturing another of his ships, Gloire.

Mathews and Chester were then assigned to the fleet sent to reduce and capture Nova Scotia under Commodore George Martin in 1710, and took over command of the force after Martin's return to England. He joined the fleet commanded by Rear Admiral Sir Hovenden Walker at Boston in summer 1711, after which he escorted a convoy to New York City. Chester was badly damaged by heavy storms during this mission, and returned to Britain for repairs. Mathews then moved ashore, and spent the next few years at the family seat of Llandaff Court.

Mathews returned to active service in January 1718, following the outbreak of war with Spain, with a temporary appointment to command HMS Prince Frederick, while a new ship, HMS Kent, was being fitted out. He took command of Kent on 31 March 1718, and joined Sir George Byng's fleet in the Mediterranean. He participated in the Battle of Cape Passaro in 1718, and was then detached in command of a squadron assigned to blockade Messina and hopefully intercept Vice-Admiral George Camocke, a British national serving with the Spanish navy. However, Camocke managed to evade the British and escape in a small boat in January, and the British squadrons were occupied with blockading Sicily until autumn 1720, when Mathews returned to Britain with Byng.

From 1722 to 1724 he was in command of a small squadron sent to the East Indies to expel the Indian Maratha KoliAdmiral Kanhoji Angre of the Malabar Coast. The presence of his ships caused Angre's activity to be much reduced, but their strongholds remained impregnable. Mathews' squadron supported Portuguese troops from Goa in an attack on the Maratha fortress at Vijaydurg & Kolaba, but this was repulsed. Mathews returned to Britain in 1724 and thereafter largely retired from the navy, and received no further promotions. It was not until 1736 that he rejoined the service in any capacity, becoming Commissioner of Chatham dockyard, though the appointment was considered a civil one.

== War of the Austrian Succession ==
The outbreak of war with Spain and the imminent threat of war with France during the early stages of the War of the Austrian Succession led to Mathews' return to active service, with a promotion to Vice-Admiral of the Red on 13 March 1741. He was given a command in the Mediterranean, and made plenipotentiary to Charles Emmanuel III, king of Sardinia, and the other courts of Italy. The appointment was somewhat unexpected, Mathews was not especially distinguished, and had not served in the navy for a number of years. His second in command in the Mediterranean was Rear-Admiral Richard Lestock, a man Mathews knew from his time as commissioner at Chatham, when Lestock had commanded the guard ships stationed in the Medway. The two had not been on good terms, and on receiving the Mediterranean posting, Mathews requested that Lestock be recalled, a request the Admiralty declined to act upon.

The two men continued their disagreements during their time in the Mediterranean, though Mathews' continued distractions with diplomatic duties meant that they did not break out into an open argument. In 1742, Mathews sent a small squadron to Naples to compel King Charles, later the King of Spain, to remain neutral. It was commanded by Commodore William Martin, who refused to enter into negotiations, and gave the king half an hour in which to return an answer. The Neapolitans were forced to agree to the British demands.

In June 1742, a squadron of Spanish galleys, which had taken refuge in the Bay of Saint-Tropez, was burnt by the fire ships of Mathews' fleet. In the meantime a Spanish squadron had taken refuge in Toulon, and was watched by the British fleet from Hyères. Mathews was promoted to Admiral of the White on 1 March 1743 and again to Admiral of the Blue on 20 August. On 21 February 1744 (N.S., 10 February O.S.) the Spaniards put to sea in company with a French force. Mathews, who had now returned to his flagship, followed, and an engagement took place on 22 and 23 February.

=== Battle of Toulon ===
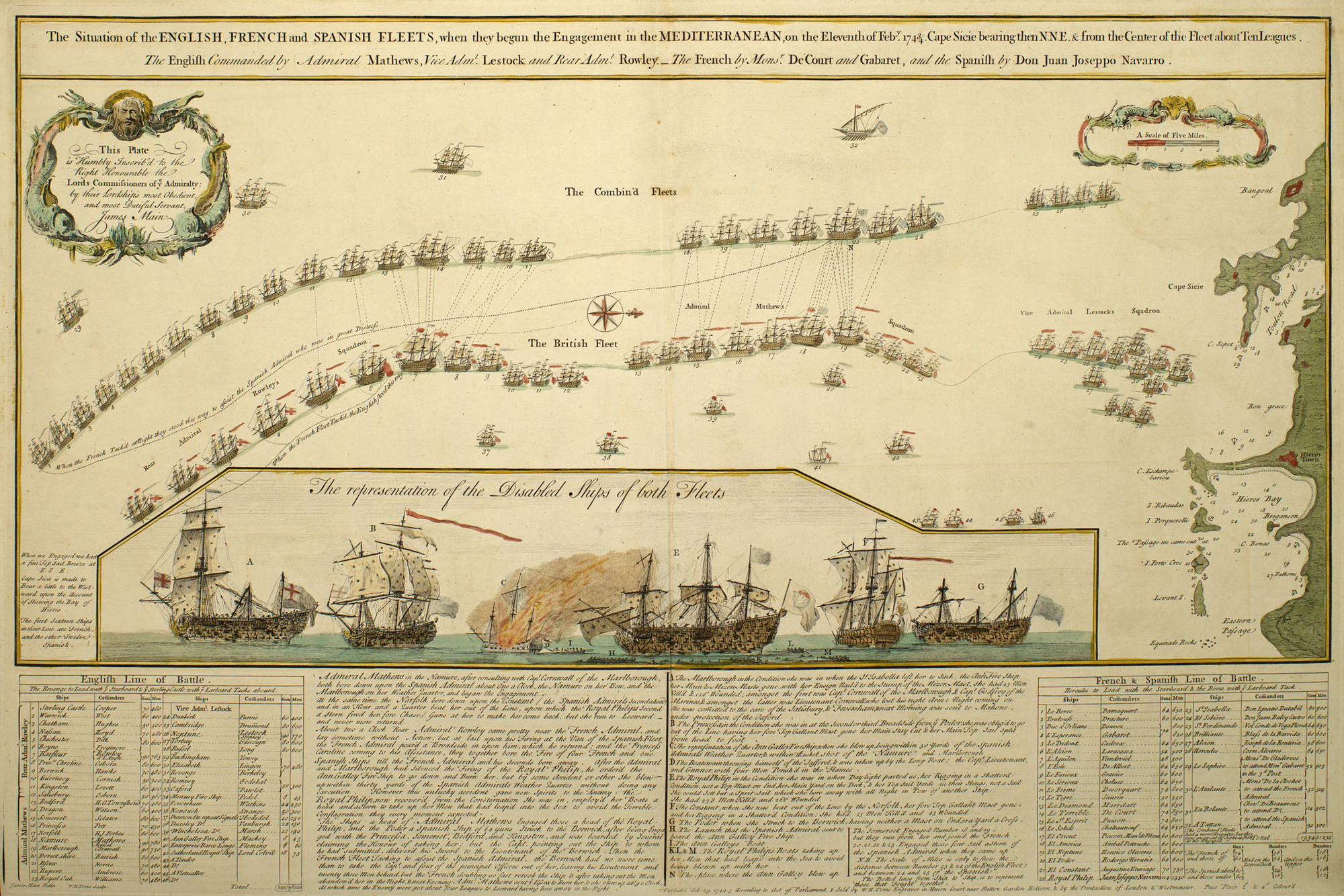
Map of the Battle of Toulon

The fleets had become scattered in the light winds as they approached, and as they began to form up for the Battle of Toulon on 22 February, Mathews signalled for the formation of the line of battle. The line had still not been formed as night fell, leading Mathews to hoist the signal to come to, intending for his ships to first finish forming the line. The van and centre squadrons did so, but Lestock commanding the rear obeyed the order to come to, without having formed the line. By daybreak on 21 February, the rear of the British fleet was separated by a considerable distance from the van and centre. Mathews signalled for Lestock to make more sail, reluctant to start the attack with his ships still disorganised, but the slowness of Lestock to respond caused the Franco-Spanish force to start to slip away to the south. Mathews feared that they would escape him, and pass through the Strait of Gibraltar to join the French force gathered at Brest for the planned invasion of Britain.

Knowing that his duty was to attack, Mathews hoisted the signal to engage the enemy aboard his flagship HMS Namur, and at one o'clock left the line to attack the Spanish rear, followed by Captain James Cornewall aboard HMS Marlborough. In doing so, the signal to form the line of battle was left flying. The two signals flying simultaneously created confusion, though a number of British commanders, including Captain Edward Hawke, followed Mathews' example. Heavily outnumbered and unsupported, with his other commanders either too uncertain, or in the case of Lestock, possibly pleased to see Mathews in difficulty and unwilling to help him, Namur and Marlborough managed to defeat their opposite numbers in the enemy line, but suffered considerable damage. The French ships came about at 5 o'clock to aid the Spanish, a manoeuvre interpreted by some of the British commanders to be an attempt to double the British line and surround them.

With no orders from Mathews and a lack of clear instructions or command structure, the British line broke, and began to flee to the northwest. The Spanish, still on the defensive, neglected to capture the defenceless Marlborough, though they did retake the Poder, which had previously surrendered to the British. The Franco-Spanish fleet then resumed their flight to the southwest, and it was not until 23 February that the British were able to regroup and resume the pursuit. They caught up with the enemy fleet again, which was hampered by towing damaged ships, and were able to retake the Poder, which Mathews ordered to be burnt. By now the British had closed to within a few miles of the enemy fleet but Mathews again signalled for the fleet to come to. The following day, 24 February, the Franco-Spanish fleet was almost out of sight, and Mathews returned to Hyères, and sailed from there to Port Mahon, where he arrived in early March.

== Inquiry and dismissal ==
The failure of the British fleet to bring a decisive action against an inferior foe had significant consequences. The opposing fleet was able to deliver troops and supplies to the Spanish army in Italy, swinging the war in their favour. This was widely remarked on back in Britain. The House of Commons petitioned King George II for a public inquiry. A dozen captains were tried by court-martial and cashiered. Lestock was also tried, but was able to place the blame on Mathews, and, with the help of powerful supporters in government, was acquitted and offered further employment. Mathews was tried by court-martial in 1746, on charges of having brought the fleet into action in a disorganised manner, of having fled the enemy, and of having failed to bring the enemy to action when the conditions were advantageous. In his defence, it was shown that he had fought bravely. However, in June 1747, the court judged the charges were proven and Mathews was dismissed from the service.

Mathews had devoted himself to work at his estate at Llandaff, and did not appear to be affected by the result of the trial. He regarded the outcome as down to factional party politics, rather than as a reflection on his conduct. Mathews moved to Bloomsbury Square in 1749 and died there on 2 October 1751. He was buried at St George's, Bloomsbury.

== Personality ==
Mathews' personality was the subject of particular study during the controversy over Toulon, with his detractors claiming that he was hot-headed, intemperate, and incapable of managing the complex task of commanding a fleet in battle, which had led to the defeat. Horace Walpole, in his correspondence with Sir Horace Mann, noted that "Mathews believes that Providence lives upon beef and pudding, loves prize-fighting and bull-baiting, and drinks fog to the health of Old England." In a speech in the Commons Walpole declared "Mathews remains in the light of a hot, brave, imperious, dull, confused fellow." Mann, who was strongly opposed to how Naples' neutrality had been violated during Mathews' tenure as commander in the Mediterranean, declared "'Tis wonderful how void Admiral Mathews is of common sense, good manners, or knowledge of the world. He understands nothing but Yes or No, and knows no medium." Walpole and his correspondents often referred to Mathews as "Il Furibondo". Despite their criticism, those who knew Mathews personally, while admitting that he could be hot-tempered, described him as "warm-hearted, kindly and affectionate; a clear-sighted magistrate, a capable farmer, and a keen sportsman".

== Family and issue ==
Mathews married Henrietta Burgess, of Antigua, in 1705. The couple had a son, Thomas, who became a major in the army. Henrietta died about 1740, and Mathews remarried about 1745, to Millicent Powell.

== Notes ==
Honorary titles
Preceded by Sir John Jennings	Rear-Admiral of Great Britain; 1743–1749	Succeeded by Sir William Rowley
