= HMS Rupert (1666) =

British naval ship

History

Great Britain
- Name: HMS Rupert
- Builder: Anthony Deane, Harwich Dockyard
- Launched: 26 January 1666
- Fate: Broken up, 1769

General characteristics as built
- Class & type: 64-gun third rate ship of the line
- Tons burthen: 791 tons
- Length: 119 ft (36 m) (keel)
- Beam: 36 ft 3 in (11.05 m)
- Depth of hold: 17 ft 1 in (5.21 m)
- Propulsion: Sails
- Sail plan: Full-rigged ship
- Complement: 320 (later 400)
- Armament: 64 guns as built, comprising 22 demi-cannon, 28 culverins and 14 demi-culverins

General characteristics after 1703 rebuild
- Class & type: 66-gun third rate ship of the line
- Tons burthen: 930 tons
- Length: 143 ft 4 in (43.69 m) (gundeck)
- Beam: 38 ft 4 in (11.68 m)
- Depth of hold: 15 ft 2 in (4.62 m)
- Propulsion: Sails
- Sail plan: Full-rigged ship
- Armament: 66 guns of various weights of shot

General characteristics after 1740 rebuild
- Class & type: 1733 proposals 60-gun fourth rate ship of the line
- Tons burthen: 1070 tons
- Length: 144 ft (44 m) (gundeck)
- Beam: 41 ft 5 in (12.62 m)
- Depth of hold: 16 ft 11 in (5.16 m)
- Propulsion: Sails
- Sail plan: Full-rigged ship
- Armament: 60 guns: Gundeck: 24 × 24 pdrs; Upper gundeck: 26 × 9 pdrs; Quarterdeck: 8 × 6 pdrs; Forecastle: 2 × 6 pdrs

HMS Rupert was a 64-gun third rate ship of the line of the Royal Navy, launched at Harwich Dockyard on 26 January 1666 and broken up in 1769.

== Construction ==
The Rupert was ordered on 26 October 1664 as part of the ship construction programme of that year. She was launched on 26 January 1666 at Harwich Dockyard.

In his diary entry of 19 May 1666, Samuel Pepys of the Navy Board describes a conversation concerning the construction of the Rupert that he had with her designer, Anthony Deane:

...the King, Duke, and every body saying it is the best ship that was ever built. And then he fell to explain to me his manner of casting the draught of water which a ship will draw before-hand: which is a secret the King and all admire in him; and he is the first that hath come to any certainty before-hand, of foretelling the draught of water of a ship before she be launched. Diary of Samuel Pepys, May 1666.

== Career ==
By 1677 the Rupert carried a complement of 400 men and 66 guns (comprising twenty-six 24-pounders, twenty-four 12-pounders, fourteen sakers [5-pounders] and two 3-pounders), but by 1685 she was carrying only 64 guns again (comprising twenty-four 24-pounders, two culverins, twenty-six 12-pounders and twelve demi-culverins).

On 1 April 1678, under Commodore Arthur Herbert, and having in company the Mary, under Captain Roger Strickland, she brought to action the Tiger, a large Algerine war ship of forty guns and 400 men. The Rupert being much in advance of the Mary, engaged the Tiger alone; but the Algerine was stoutly defended, and until the Mary had arrived up, refused to surrender. The Tiger lost one-half of her crew before she struck. Herbert lost an eye, and nearly all his officers and nineteen men were killed, and between thirty and forty wounded.

In 1697 she was taken into Plymouth Dockyard to be rebuilt by Benjamin Rosewell, and she was relaunched in November 1703 as a 66-gun third rate once again. In 1716 she was reduced to a fourth rate, and on 16 August 1736 she was ordered to be taken to pieces and rebuilt at Sheerness Dockyard, although by this date the practice of rebuilding had become a legal fiction, and 'rebuilt' ships were in practice new vessels incorporating a small portion of their predecessor's timber into the construction. She was relaunched on 27 October 1740 as 60-gun fourth rate ship of the line built to the 1733 proposals of the 1719 Establishment.

Rupert was broken up in 1769.
