= Admiral of the Blue =

Former senior rank of the British Royal Navy

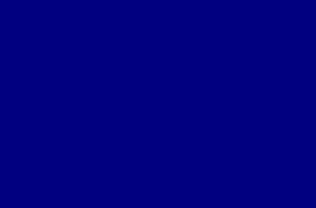
- Command flag (1625–1864)
- Country: United Kingdom
- Service branch: Royal Navy
- Abbreviation: AB
- Next higher rank: Admiral of the White
- Next lower rank: Vice-Admiral of the Red

Admiral of the Blue was a senior rank of the Royal Navy of the United Kingdom, immediately outranked by the rank Admiral of the White (see order of precedence below). From 1688 to 1805 this rank was in order of precedence third; after 1805 it was the fourth. In 1864 it was abolished as a promotional rank. The command flag for an Admiral of the Blue is a plain blue flag.

== History ==
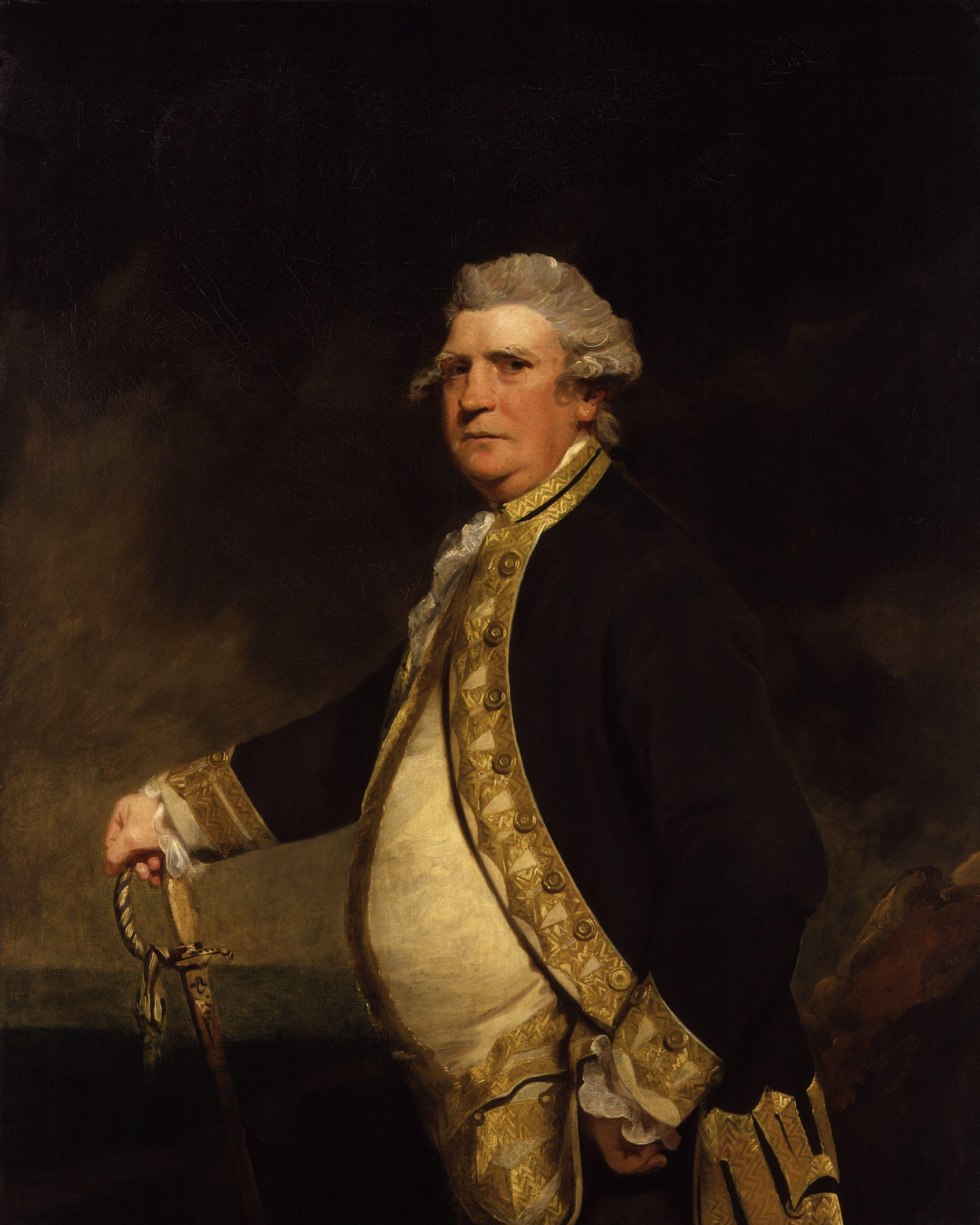
1779 portrait of Augustus Keppel as Admiral of the Blue

The Royal Navy inaugurated squadron colours during the reign of Elizabeth I (1558-1603) to subdivide the English fleet into three squadrons. There were three classes of admirals and differentiated by using coloured flags. In 1620 the official flag ranks of admiral, vice admiral, and rear admiral were legally established that arose directly out of the organisation of the fleet into three parts. In 1688 the formal flag rank of Admiral of the Fleet was created.

The Admiral of the Blue was a senior rank of the Royal Navy of the United Kingdom, immediately outranked by the rank Admiral of the White (see order of precedence below). Royal Navy officers currently holding the ranks of commodore, rear admiral, vice admiral and admiral of the fleet are sometimes considered generically to be admirals. From 1688 to 1805 this rank was in order of precedence third; after 1805 it was the fourth. In 1864 it was abolished as a promotional rank.

== Order of precedence Admirals of the Colour ==
The Navy was divided into three squadrons White, Blue and Red, in order of seniority. Admirals were appointed to these squadrons and therefore their rank and squadron split the seniority originally into 9 bands then later 10 with ‘Admiral of the Fleet' as senior to all others.

Seniority was therefore from 1805 to 1864:

1. Admiral of the Fleet
2. Admiral of the Red Squadron (rank created in 1805)
3. Admiral of the White Squadron
4. Admiral of the Blue Squadron
5. Vice-Admiral of the Red Squadron
6. Vice-Admiral of the White Squadron
7. Vice-Admiral of the Blue Squadron
8. Rear-Admiral of the Red Squadron
9. Rear-Admiral of the White Squadron
10. Rear-Admiral of the Blue Squadron

Seniority was therefore from 1624 to 1805:

1. Admiral of the Fleet, (rank created in 1688)
2. Admiral of the White Squadron
3. Admiral of the Blue Squadron
4. Vice-Admiral of the Red Squadron
5. Vice-Admiral of the White Squadron
6. Vice-Admiral of the Blue Squadron
7. Rear-Admiral of the Red Squadron
8. Rear-Admiral of the White Squadron
9. Rear-Admiral of the Blue Squadron

Admirals without an appointment were colloquially referred to as Yellow Admirals. Ships of the Royal Navy flew the Ensign that coincided with the squadron of their commanding officer.

== See also ==
- List of command flags of the Royal Navy
