= HMS Boyne (1692) =

Royal Navy third-rate ship of the line

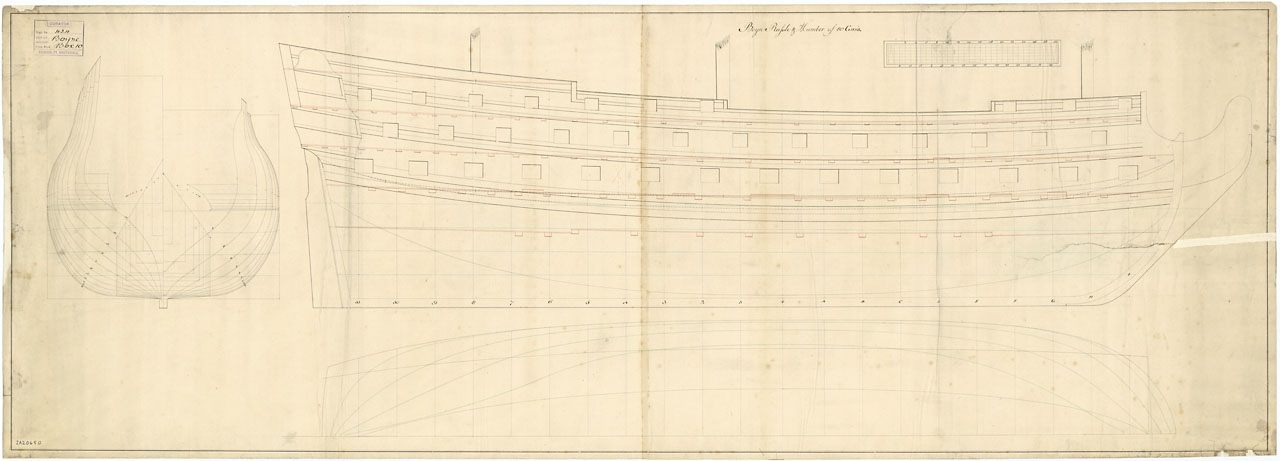
- Boyne (1708 plan)

History

Great Britain
- Name: HMS Boyne
- Namesake: Battle of the Boyne (1690)
- Builder: Harding, Deptford Dockyard
- Launched: 21 May 1692
- Fate: Broken up, 1763

General characteristics as built
- Class & type: 80-gun third-rate ship of the line
- Tons burthen: 1,160 tons BM
- Length: 157 ft (47.9 m) (gundeck)
- Beam: 41 ft 3 in (12.6 m)
- Depth of hold: 17 ft 3 in (5.3 m)
- Propulsion: Sails
- Sail plan: Full-rigged ship
- Armament: 80 guns of various weights of shot

General characteristics after 1708 rebuild
- Class & type: 1706 Establishment 80-gun third-rate ship of the line
- Tons burthen: 1,301 tons BM
- Length: 156 ft (47.5 m) (gundeck)
- Beam: 43 ft 6 in (13.3 m)
- Depth of hold: 17 ft 8 in (5.4 m)
- Propulsion: Sails
- Sail plan: Full-rigged ship
- Armament: 80 guns: Gundeck: 26 × 32 pdrs; Middle gundeck: 26 × 12 pdrs; Upper gundeck: 24 × 6 pdrs; Quarterdeck: 4 × 6 pdrs

General characteristics after 1739 rebuild
- Class & type: 1733 proposals 80-gun third-rate ship of the line
- Tons burthen: 1,390
- Length: 158 ft (48.2 m) (gundeck)
- Beam: 45 ft 5 in (13.8 m)
- Depth of hold: 18 ft 7 in (5.7 m)
- Propulsion: Sails
- Sail plan: Full-rigged ship
- Armament: 80 guns: Gundeck: 26 × 32 pdrs; Middle gundeck: 26 × 12 pdrs; Upper gundeck: 24 × 6 pdrs; Quarterdeck: 4 × 6 pdrs

HMS Boyne was an 80-gun third-rate ship of the line of the Royal Navy, launched at Deptford Dockyard on 21 May 1692.

She was rebuilt to the 1706 Establishment at Blackwall Yard, mounting her guns on three instead of her original two gundecks, though she was still classified as a third rate. She was relaunched from Blackwall on 26 March 1708. Her second rebuild took place at Deptford, where she was reconstructed according to the 1733 proposals of the 1719 Establishment, and relaunched on 28 May 1739.

Boyne was part of Vice-Admiral Edward Vernon's fleet and took part in the expedition to Cartagena de Indias during the War of Jenkins' Ear. She was broken up in 1763.
