= Henry Calder =

Henry Calder may refer to:

- Henry Calder (English cricketer) (1858–1938)
- Henry Calder (Australian cricketer) (1906–1970)
- Sir Henry Calder, 4th Baronet (1774–1792), of the Calder baronets
- Sir Henry Calder, 5th Baronet (1792–1868), of the Calder baronets

== See also ==
- Harry Calder (1901–1995), cricketer
- Calder (disambiguation)
