= Calder (surname) =

Calder is a surname of Scottish origin. Notable people with the surname include:

== Arts and entertainment ==
- Alexander Milne Calder (1846–1923), American sculptor, father of:
  - Alexander Stirling Calder (1870–1945), American sculptor, father of:
    - Alexander Calder (1898–1976), American sculptor, inventor of mobile sculpture
- Alison Calder (born 1969), Canadian poet and literary critic
- Angus Calder (1942–2008), Scottish writer, historian and poet, son of Peter Calder
- David Calder (actor) (born 1946), English actor
- James Traill Calder (1794–1864), Scottish local historian
- John Calder (1927–2018), founder of Calder Publishing
- Keith Calder (born 1979), American film producer
- Rebecca Calder (born 1981), English actress
- Simon Calder (born 1955), travel writer
- Tony Calder (1943–2018), English music manager

== Politics ==
- Alexander Calder (Beaumont, Texas) (1806–1853), first mayor of Beaumont, Texas
- Archibald Clement Calder, Canadian politician
- Frank Arthur Calder (1915–2006), Canadian politician, plaintiff in Calder v British Columbia (AG)
- James Alexander Calder (1868–1956), Canadian politician
- James Erskine Calder (1808–1882), English-born Surveyor General of Tasmania
- John Alexander Calder, Canadian politician
- Ritchie Calder (1906–1982), Scottish author, journalist and academic, father of Nigel
- Sam Calder (1916–2008), Australian politician
- William M. Calder (1869–1945), senator from New York

== Religion ==
- David O. Calder (1823–1884), Mormon pioneer
- John Calder (minister) (1733–1815), Scottish dissenting minister
- Robert Calder (priest) (1650?–1723), clergyman of the Scottish Episcopal Church, author, and controversialist

== Science and medicine ==
- Alvinus Calder (1892–1975), Canadian physician
- James Calder (orthopaedic surgeon) (born 1968), English orthopaedic surgeon
- Mary Gordon Calder (c. 1906–1992), Scottish palaeobotanist
- Muffy Calder (born 1958), Canadian-born Scottish computer scientist
- Nigel Calder (1931–2014), British science writer, son of Peter, father of Simon

== Sport ==
- Barbara Calder (1924–2018), British yachtswoman
- Bob Calder (1907–1973), Scottish footballer
- David Calder (rower) (born 1978), Canadian rower
- Eddie Calder, American college basketball player
- Finlay Calder (b. 1957), Scottish rugby player
- Frank Calder (1877–1943), British-born Canadian ice hockey executive, journalist, and first National Hockey League president
- Harry Calder (1901–1995), South African cricketer
- Jim Calder (footballer) (born 1960), Scottish footballer
- Jim Calder (rugby league) (fl. 1929–1936), New Zealand rugby player
- Jim Calder (rugby union) (born 1957), Scottish rugby player
- Katie Calder (born 1980), New Zealand cross-country skier

== Other fields ==
- Clive Calder (born 1946), South African-born British billionaire recording executive and businessman
- Jean Calder (1932/1933–2022), Australian humanitarian worker
- Kent E. Calder (born 1948), American professor of East Asian studies
- James Calder (academic administrator) (1826–1893), fifth president of Pennsylvania State University, USA
- Sir James Calder, 1st Baronet (1686–1711), of the Calder baronets
- Sir James Calder, 3rd Baronet (1760–1774), of the Calder baronets
- Robert Calder (1745–1818), British naval officer
