= Kaldor =

Kaldor is a Jewish surname. Notable people with the surname include:

- Amber Kaldor (born 1990), Australian acrobatic gymnast
- Connie Kaldor (born 1953), Canadian folk singer and songwriter
- John Kaldor (born 1936), Australian art collector and philanthropist
- John Kaldor, a character in the 1996 novel Awake and Dreaming by Kit Pearson
- Lee Kaldor, Democratic legislator in the North Dakota State House
- Mary Kaldor (born 1946), British economics academic
- Nicholas Kaldor (1908–1986), British economist

== See also ==
- Kaldor City, fictional city of the future in Doctor Who
- Andrew & Renata Kaldor Centre for International Refugee Law
- Kaldar (disambiguation)
- Calder (surname)
- Calder (disambiguation)
