= Thomas Calder =

Thomas Calder may refer to:

- Thomas Calder of the Calder baronets
- Tom Calder, footballer

== See also ==
- Calder (surname)
