= Calder =

Calder may refer to:

== People ==
- Calder (surname)
- Clan Calder, a Highland Scottish clan

== Places ==
- Calder, Tasmania, Australia, a locality
- Calder, Edmonton, a neighbourhood in the city of Edmonton, Alberta, Canada
- Calder, Saskatchewan, Canada, a village
- Rural Municipality of Calder No. 241, Saskatchewan, Canada, a rural municipality
- Calder, Cumbria, England, a village
- Calder, Saint Vincent and the Grenadines, a town on the island of Saint Vincent
- Cawdor, Scotland, original name Calder, a Highland council area
- River Calder (disambiguation), in Scotland, Northern England, and Australia

== Sports ==
- Calder Cannons, an Australian rules football club based in Melbourne, Australia
- Calder Memorial Trophy, awarded to the rookie of the year in the National Hockey League
- Calder Cup, awarded to the winner of the American Hockey League playoffs
- Calder Race Course, a horse racetrack in Miami Gardens, Florida, United States

== Other uses ==
- Calder Abbey in northwest England
- Calder Houses, listed on the National Register of Historic Places in Linn County, Iowa, United States
- Calder baronets, two baronetcies created for people with the surname Calder
- Calder Publishing, a British publishing company specializing in works about the arts
- Calder v British Columbia (AG), case decided by the Supreme Court of Canada relating to aboriginal land titles
- Calder Freeway, Victoria, Australia
- Calder Highway, Victoria, Australia
- Calder (crater), a crater on Mercury
- Calder Pillay, a major character in the Chasing Vermeer children's novel series by Blue Balliet
- SS Calder, several ships

== See also ==
- East Calder, Mid Calder and West Calder, three villages in West Lothian, Scotland
- Calder Park (disambiguation)
- Calders (disambiguation)
