= HMS Harwich (1743) =

Royal Navy ship

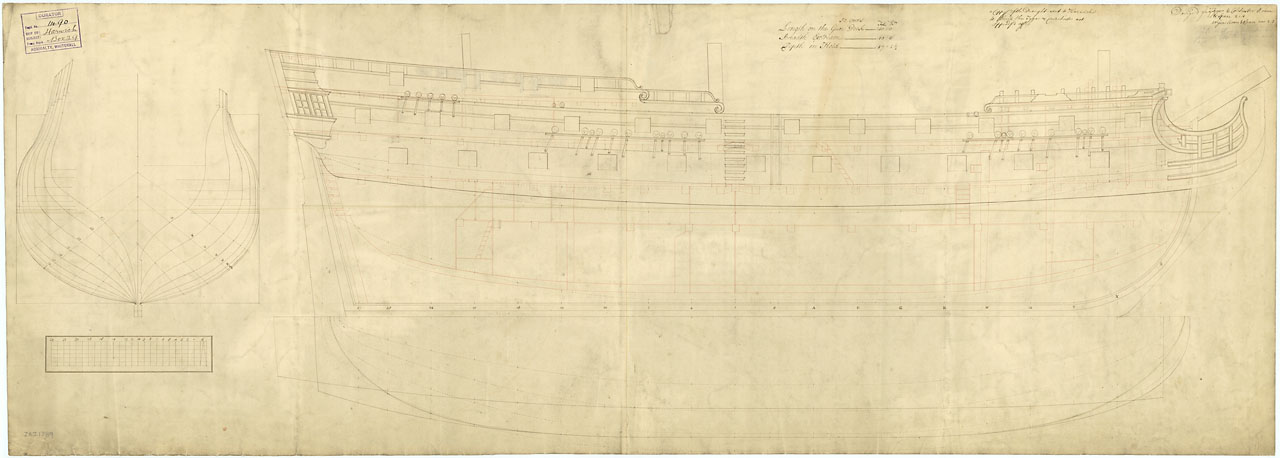
- Harwich

History

Great Britain
- Name: HMS Harwich
- Ordered: 6 August 1742
- Builder: Barnard, Harwich, Essex
- Launched: 22 December 1743
- Fate: Wrecked, 1760

General characteristics
- Class & type: 1741 proposals 50-gun fourth rate ship of the line
- Tons burthen: 976 (bm)
- Length: 140 ft (42.7 m) (gundeck)
- Beam: 40 ft (12.2 m)
- Depth of hold: 17 ft 2 1/2 in (5.2 m)
- Propulsion: Sails
- Sail plan: Full-rigged ship
- Armament: Gundeck: 22 × 24-pounder guns; Upper gundeck: 22 × 12-pounder guns; QD: 4 × 6-pounder guns; Fc: 2 × 6-pounder guns

HMS Harwich was a 50-gun fourth rate ship of the line of the Royal Navy, built at King's Yard in Harwich by John Barnard to the dimensions laid down in the 1741 proposals of the 1719 Establishment at Harwich, and launched on 22 December 1743.

Her captain, William Adams, was killed in 1748 during Edward Boscawen's unsuccessful siege of Pondicherry during the War of the Austrian Succession.

At some point around in 1757 or shortly before, Harwich captured the Maria Louisa Magdalena, Messagere, and Comte de Maurepas. She shared the prize money, by agreement, with Torbay and Rochester.

In 1758 she participated in the British Capture of Senegal, captained by Commodore Henry Marsh.

Harwich was wrecked in 1760.
