= Fort Saint Louis (Senegal) =

Fort built in 1659 in Saint Louis, Senegal

- Part of Senegal
- Saint Louis, Senegal
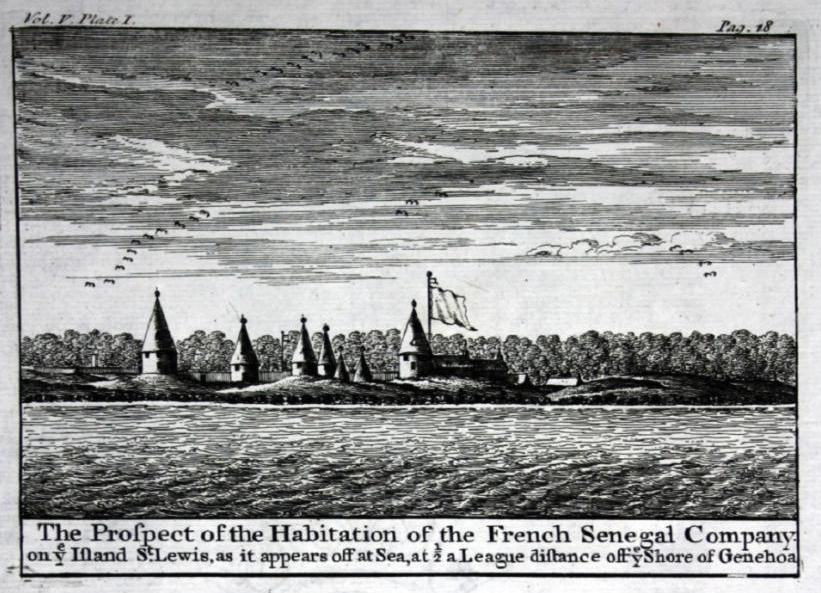
- Illustration from A Collection of Voyages and Travels

Site information
- Controlled by: Compagnie du Sénégal (1659–1758)

Site history
- Built: 1659
- Battles/wars: British Capture of Senegal

Garrison information
- Occupants: France (1659–1758); England (1758–1783); France (1783–)

Fort Saint Louis was a slave fort built by the Compagnie du Sénégal in Saint Louis, Senegal in 1659.

The fort surrendered on 30 April, 1758, and it was captured by Henry Marsh during the British capture of Senegal.
