= British capture of Senegal =

1758 battle in Senegal

- Part of Seven Years' War
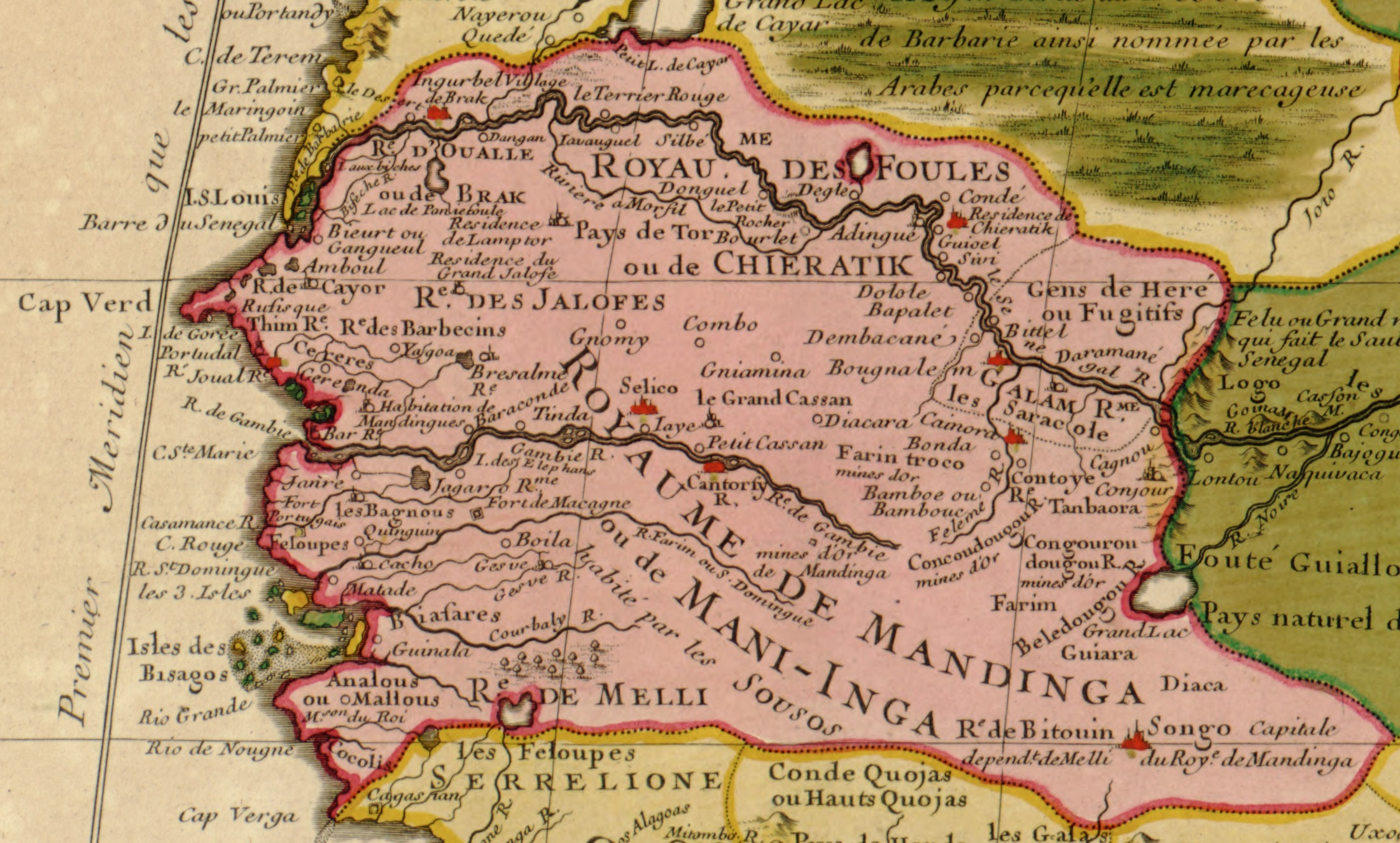
- A map depicting the various kingdoms of Senegambia in 1707, by Guillaume Delisle. In the 18th century, France only controlled the city of Saint-Louis and the island of Gorée.
Date	April – May 1758
Location	Saint-Louis, Senegal 16.0333°N 16.5000°W
Result	British victory

Belligerents
Great Britain	France

Commanders and leaders
Henry Marsh; James Sayer	Unknown

Strength
200 marines Light artillery 6 Royal Navy vessels: * HMS Harwich * HMS Nassau * HMS Rye (1745) * HMS Swan (1745) * HMS London (1756) * HMS Portsmouth (1756); 5 hired armed vessels	232 officers and soldiers 92 guns A brig 6 sloops

The British capture of Senegal took place in 1758 during the Seven Years' War with France, as part of a concerted British strategy to weaken the French economy by damaging her international trade. To this end, a succession of small British military expeditions landed in Senegal and captured Gorée and Fort Saint Louis, the French slave fort located at Saint-Louis, seizing French vessels and supplies. By late 1758 the whole of the French colony on the Senegalese coast had been captured by the British, with administrative matters being handled by the first (and only) British Governor of Senegal, Lieutenant Colonel Richard Worge.

== Background ==
The plan was devised by an American merchant Thomas Cumming who had previously visited West Africa, and extensively considered the possibilities for a British expedition. The plan was built around Britain's growing dominance on the Oceans which had dramatically reduced French sea power. A British naval force under Captain Henry Marsh would sail from England and head for the coast of West Africa, where it would land an amphibious force at the Senegal River. They would then capture the French fort at Saint-Louis. Cumming planned to raise support from local African forces, who would rendezvous with the British and attack the French.

The French settlements in Senegal had little strategic value, but they were important to France's global trade in slaves. They were also home to a substantial industry in natural gums. The principal object of the expedition was therefore to damage the French economy by cutting access to these industries. Such expeditions were part of Southern Secretary William Pitt's strategy of destroying France's capacity to continue the war by draining her of funds.

== Expedition ==
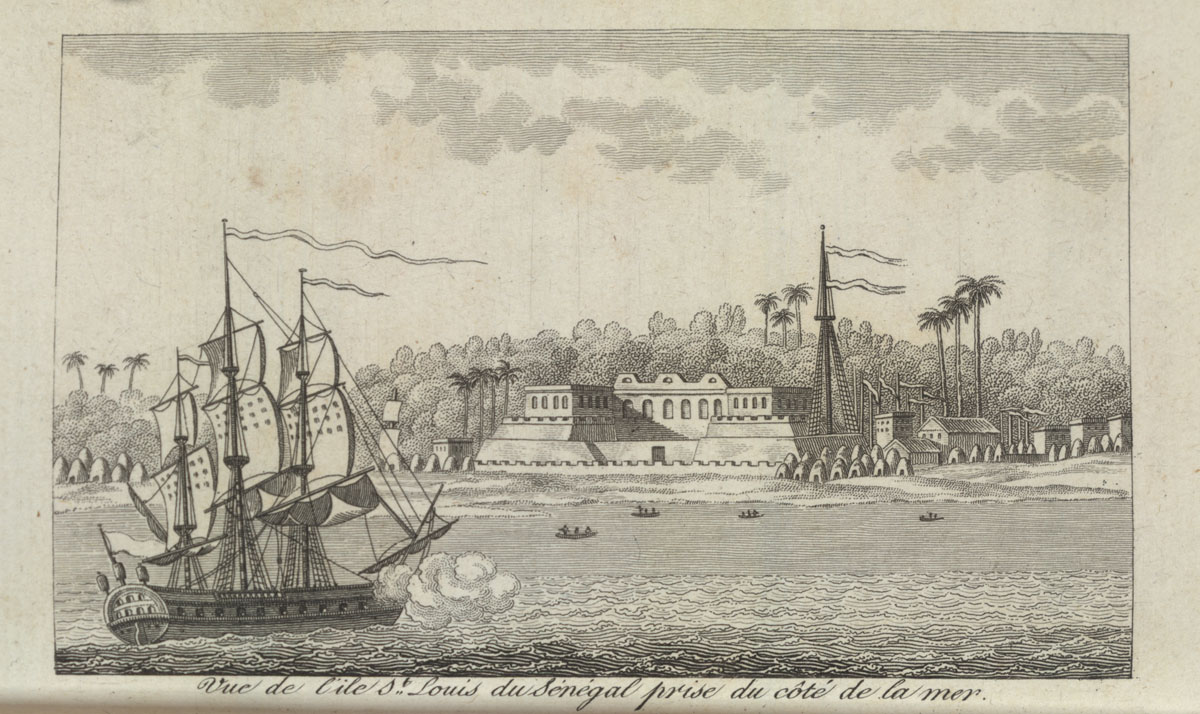
The settlement of Saint-Louis in 1780

Two hundred troops and two warships were to take part in the expedition. The forces departed from Plymouth in early 1758, and after a brief stop for supplies at Tenerife, they reached the coast of West Africa in April. Cumming had gone ashore to secure support amongst locals, and they launched a landward blockade of the fort. Marsh then put his troops ashore. The sudden arrival of British troops took the garrison completely by surprise. On 1 May, the French surrendered the fort, and the resident traders swore allegiance to the British. Not a single Briton was killed in the taking of the settlement.

Cumming's ships returned home crammed with captured goods valued at hundreds of thousands of pounds. Pitt was extremely pleased at the ease with which the British forces had taken Saint-Louis. He was also impressed by the large quantity of gum arabic brought back to Britain, as it provided a much cheaper source for silk-weavers. In the wake of the missions' success, two further expeditions were sent out that year, which captured the Island of Gorée and the French trading station on the Gambia. Pitt would have liked to have launched further expeditions but could not in the face of opposition from the Duke of Newcastle who feared that stripping the British Isles of troops would leave them vulnerable to invasion.

== Aftermath ==
Along with expeditions against Canada, the West Indies and Philippines, the capture of Senegal demonstrated the new global reach of the Royal Navy and the increasingly global nature of European conflicts – as a consequence historians have labeled it the first 'world war'. Ownership of the West African possessions became a major source of contention between Britain and France during the peace talks that led to the 1763 Treaty of Paris. The negotiations centred on a potential return of some of the captured outposts. Britain was keen to hold of the Senegalese mainland, but willing to return Gorée. Ultimately, Britain kept Saint-Louis and the Senegal mainland as a part of British Senegambia.

The British intended to build up their presence in West Africa, and intended to use Senegal as a starting point for this. To protect their new possession, they raised the Africa Corps, a special unit of troops under the command of Charles O'Hara. The French were unhappy about the loss of this valuable colony, and planned to recapture it. In 1764, the French launched incursions against the coast of Senegal from Gorée, angering the British cabinet.

Under O'Hara's leadership, the British bribed the Moorish emirates of Trarza and Brakna into raiding and pillaging the neighbouring kingdoms of Waalo and Futa Toro. This enabled them to buy thousands of slaves from the Moors.

In 1779, during the American Revolutionary War, a French force landed and seized Saint-Louis, and Senegal was ceded to them by Britain as part of the Treaty of Paris that ended the war in 1783. French control remained sporadic until its final departure in 1852.

== Diaspora ==
This event had a far reaching impact on all those involved in the conflict. British armed forces had taken several French slave forts along the coastline, their enslaved occupants became spoils of war to be shared amongst British Military Officers, who upon their return home would employ them as servants, give them away as gifts, or offer them for sale.

Pendar, a girl of about 14, is believed to be part of the Senegalese diaspora who came directly to Britain from Africa as a result of this military action. Her Swahili name, meaning love, remains common around the Senegambia region of West Africa.

She resided with a Captain 'Broom', in London, at least until March 1761. 'Broom' gave the Parade, St James Park as his contact address, now known as Horse Guards Parade, the headquarters of the British Army. This was in fact Captain Joseph Brome who was Master Gunner of the British Army from 1760 and based in the newly completed (1756) Horse Guards building.

In March 1761 Captain 'Broom' placed an advert in a London newspaper as Pendar had been missing for two days, having been sent out to deliver a message. She was young; responded to an African name; and spoke no English, all of which are indicative of her recent arrival and left her vulnerable on the streets of London. The language 'Broom' uses in the advert he places to try and find Pendar, reveals a level of concern and empathy that contrasts sharply with the tone of other runaway adverts. The phrase 'if willing' left Pendar with a rare choice - whether to return, or not.

== See also ==
- France in the Seven Years' War
- History of Senegal

== Bibliography ==
- Anderson, Fred. Crucible of War: The Seven Years' War and the fate of Empire in British North America, 1754–1766. Faber and Faber, 2000.
- Brown, Peter Douglas. William Pitt, Earl of Chatham: The Great Commoner. George Allen & Unwin, 1978.
- Dull, Jonathan R. The French Navy and the Seven Years' War. University of Nebraska, 2005.
- McLynn, Frank. 1759: The Year Britain Became Master of the World. Pimlico, 2005.
- Simms, Brendan. Three Victories and a Defeat: The Rise and Fall of the First British Empire. Penguin Books (2008)
