= Wealth maximization =

Principle in welfare economics

Wealth maximization is a normative principle in welfare economics that seeks to maximize the total “economic surplus” in society by summing individuals’ willingness to pay for desired goods, services, or states of affairs. Although it originated in theoretical economics—most notably through the work on Kaldor–Hicks efficiency—it later became a central concept in law and economics, particularly under the influence of Richard Posner. Proponents argue that many legal doctrines appear to promote efficient resource allocation when measured by this willingness-to-pay standard, while critics contend it can neglect distributive fairness, rights, or moral values that do not reduce neatly to monetary terms.

== Development ==
=== Welfare Economics ===
Wealth maximization is closely linked to the evolution of welfare economics in the early and mid-20th century. Vilfredo Pareto introduced the idea of Pareto efficiency, under which a policy change is “better” only if at least one person is made better off without making anyone else worse off. In practice, few real-world policies meet that standard, prompting scholars such as Nicholas Kaldor and John Hicks to propose a more flexible “compensation criterion” in the late 1930s. Under what later became known as Kaldor–Hicks efficiency, a policy is considered efficient if the “winners” from the policy could in theory compensate the “losers” and still come out ahead, even if actual compensation does not occur.

These ideas laid the groundwork for “wealth maximization” as a normative principle: maximize total willingness-to-pay across society, thereby favoring changes that generate a net increase in economic surplus. While this approach allows trade-offs in which some parties lose, it justifies them by positing that society’s overall resources increase enough that losers could be compensated through separate policy mechanisms (e.g., taxes and transfers).

=== Key Concepts and Clarifications ===
Under Pareto efficiency, any change that makes even one individual worse off is disallowed, unless compensated. Because most large-scale reforms will harm at least some parties, Pareto improvements are rare. By contrast, under Kaldor–Hicks efficiency—the foundation of wealth maximization—the focus is on net gains. A policy is deemed beneficial if it creates enough surplus so that losers could be indemnified by winners, even if such compensation does not literally occur.

A frequent misunderstanding is that wealth maximization aims to increase the quantity of money itself. However, “wealth” here represents the total value that individuals place on outcomes. Hence, money is simply a tool for measuring preference intensity. In this framework, if someone pays $50 for a good, that suggests it is worth at least $50 to them relative to other uses of those funds. Proponents note that a monetary measure is relatively transparent, observable, widely understood, and operational in markets. However, critics contend that when individuals have very different incomes, willingness-to-pay may not accurately capture how strongly each party values a good (the so-called “affluence effect”).

=== Centrality in Law and Economics ===
Law and economics is an intellectual movement that applies economic tools to analyze legal rules, institutions, and policies. It gained prominence in the United States from the 1970s onward, advocating that many legal doctrines—torts, contracts, property, and so forth—can be better understood by examining how they affect incentives and resource allocation.

A major catalyst was Richard Posner’s Economic Analysis of Law (1973), which presented the idea that legal rules often (consciously or not) promote socially efficient outcomes aligned with wealth maximization. Courts and policymakers subsequently began invoking efficiency arguments, and wealth maximization became a key concept for evaluating whether a given legal rule increases total surplus. By the 1980s, law and economics had become a dominant approach in U.S. legal scholarship, shaping everything from judicial reasoning to legislative impact assessments.

== Critiques ==
=== Distribution and justice ===
A primary objection is that wealth maximization can ignore the distribution of resources. If a wealthy party’s willingness to pay for some benefit greatly exceeds a poorer party’s, the result may be deemed “efficient” even though it exacerbates inequality. Philosophers such as Ronald Dworkin and G.A. Cohen argue that legal institutions cannot be judged solely by efficiency if they systematically favor the affluent. Proponents respond that fairness goals are better addressed through tax-and-transfer schemes rather than tinkering with core legal doctrines, thus preserving economic efficiency in the legal system while allowing society to correct undesirable inequalities elsewhere.

=== Rights-based objections ===
Another critique is that fundamental rights may be overridden if efficiency gains are large enough. For instance, if suppressing speech yielded a significant net increase in economic surplus, a strict wealth-maximization approach might endorse it. Defenders argue that clear and stable rights often contribute to long-term prosperity, reducing uncertainty and facilitating exchanges that increase wealth, and that some rights may need to be treated as “off limits” to routine cost-benefit analysis.

=== Moral value and incommensurability ===
Wealth maximization has also been challenged by theorists who emphasize non-monetary values such as dignity, autonomy, or democratic participation. Martha Nussbaum’s capabilities approach, for example, stresses the importance of human functioning and “capabilities” that can be undervalued when everything is measured by willingness to pay. Proponents maintain that legal systems almost universally employ monetary mechanisms (e.g., damages, fines) to enforce rights and obligations, making a financial metric an unavoidable common denominator—albeit one that should be supplemented by ethical and institutional safeguards.

== Defenses and Justifications ==
=== Posner's Defense of Wealth Maximization ===
In “Wealth Maximization Revisited,” Posner addressed criticisms that wealth maximization was too narrow or overlooked rights. He argued that, in the long run, social welfare and moral intuitions often align with rules that maximize overall resources. By encouraging productivity and exchange, these rules can provide the material basis for achieving various social and individual goals.

=== “Fairness versus Welfare” ===
Louis Kaplow and Steven Shavell further developed this efficiency-based perspective in Fairness versus Welfare, contending that direct pursuit of economic efficiency need not conflict with fairness—provided that society handles redistribution through income tax or other fiscal tools, rather than attempting to embed equity principles in every legal rule. They argue that structuring the legal system primarily around efficiency fosters clarity, predictability, and wealth creation, while separate fiscal programs can address the inequities that arise from market outcomes. By segregating these functions, Kaplow and Shavell maintain, policymakers can more systematically counteract regressive effects without compromising the incentive structures that promote overall wealth.

In their view, conflating equity goals with legal doctrines can lead to muddled policies and unintended consequences. For example, a tort rule calibrated to redistribute wealth between parties might weaken deterrence or distort settlement incentives. Similarly, a property rule tweaked for fairness could reduce the incentives for private investment. Thus, Kaplow and Shavell claim that mixing efficiency and equity in the same doctrinal sphere often undermines both. Instead, they recommend using legal rules to maximize societal surplus and then relying on well-crafted taxes and transfers to address distributive concerns.

=== Social Contract Foundations ===
Daniel Pi and Francesco Parisi argue that wealth maximization can be normatively grounded in liberal social contract theory. They maintain that by pushing total economic surplus to its highest feasible level, a wealth-maximizing regime creates the broadest “bargaining space,” affording those who benefit the most the greatest ability to compensate or placate potential dissenters—individuals who might otherwise refuse assent or disrupt the social contract. This dynamic, Pi and Parisi maintain, fosters broad assent in a Hobbesian sense and, moreover, corresponds to what a risk-neutral individual would choose behind a Rawlsian “veil of ignorance.” Pi and Parisi contend that wealth maximization should not be viewed merely as a pragmatic stand-in for utilitarianism. Rather, they present it as an autonomous theory with a stronger normative basis in liberal political philosophy, offering deeper justifications than classical utility-based approaches.
