= Henry Medley =

Royal Navy officer and colonial administrator (1687–1747)

Vice-Admiral The Honourable Henry Medley
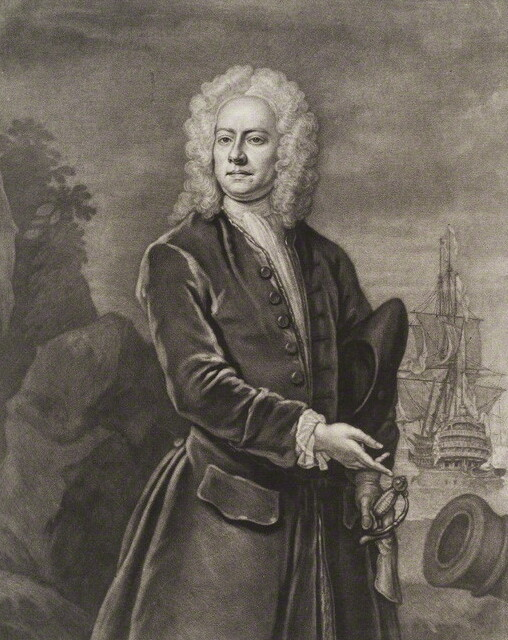
- 1745 engraving of Medley
- Born: 1687
- Died: August 5, 1747 (aged 59–60); Aboard HMS Russell, at Vado Ligure
- Military career
- Allegiance: England; Great Britain
- Branch: Royal Navy
- Rank: Vice-Admiral of the Red
- Commands: HMS Poole; HMS York; HMS Leopard; HMS Romney; HMS Nassau; Mediterranean Fleet
- Conflicts: War of the Spanish Succession; War of the Quadruple Alliance; Anglo-Spanish War; War of the Austrian Succession

Viceregal styles of Henry Medley
- Reference style: His Excellency
- Spoken style: Your Excellency

Vice-Admiral of the Red Henry Medley (1687 – 5 August 1747) was a Royal Navy officer and colonial administrator.

== Life ==
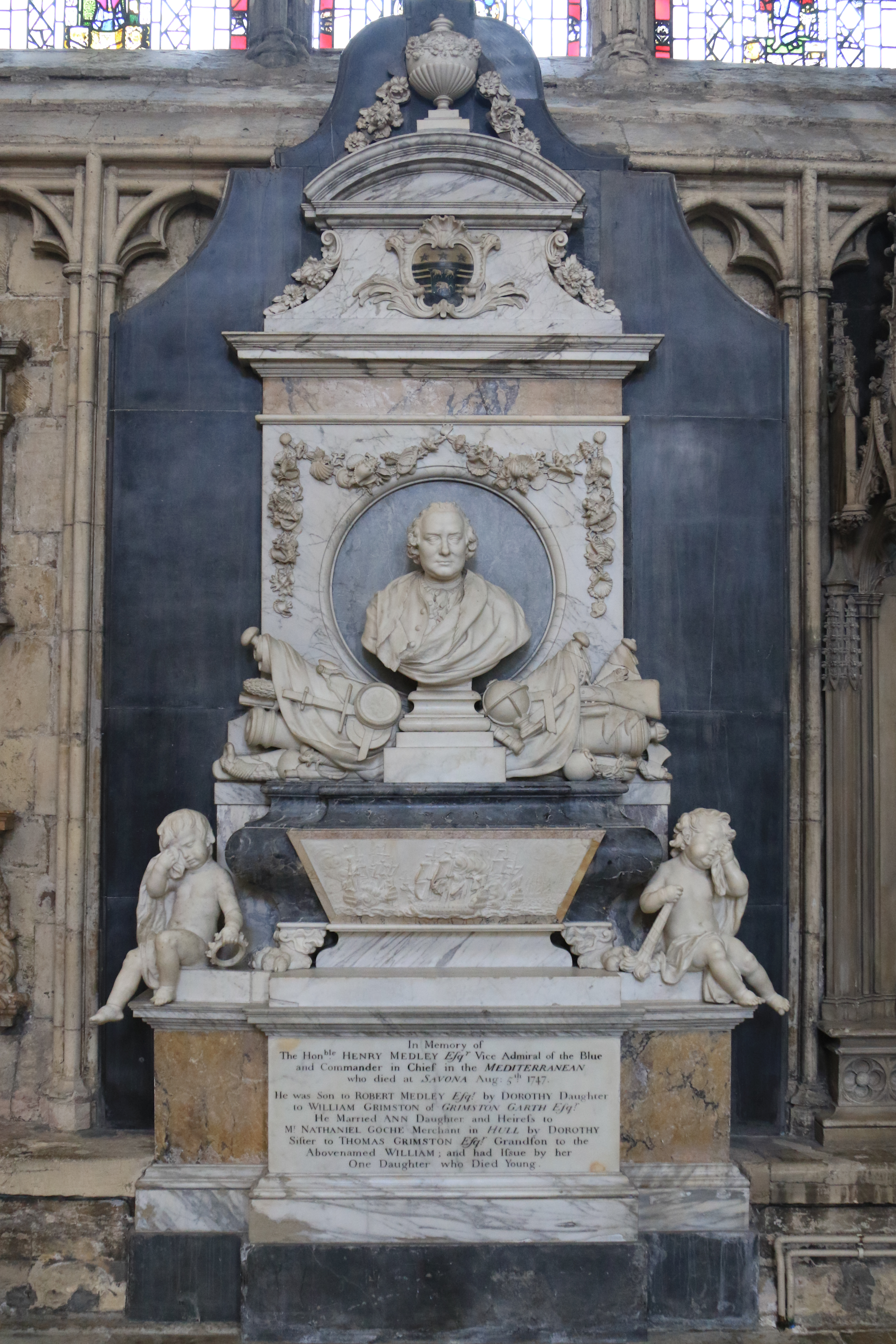
Memorial in York Minster

Medley entered the Royal Navy in 1703, and in 1706 was midshipman of the 80-gun HMS Somerset with Captain Price at the relief of Barcelona. He passed his examination as lieutenant on 8 February 1710, and on 5 September 1710 was promoted by Sir John Norris to be lieutenant of HMS Fame; a few months later he was moved into the 70-gun HMS Stirling Castle. In 1717 he was a lieutenant of the 90-gun HMS Barfleur, flagship of Sir George Byng in the Baltic Sea.

Early in 1720 Medley was promoted to the command of HMS Poole, a fire-ship, and on 17 February 1721 was posted into the 60-gun HMS York. In 1722, while commanding the 50-gun HMS Leopard in the Mediterranean, he seized a ship named the Revolution, lying within the mole of Genoa, on information of her being in the service of the Old Pretender. He later commanded the Leopard on the coast of Portugal and in the English Channel until the end of 1728.

From 1731 to 1735 Medley was employed on the home station. In 1739 and 1740 he was on fishery protection with the Newfoundland fleet, in HMS Romney. At this period he was Governor of Newfoundland.^{[a]}

In 1741 Medley commanded the 70-gun HMS Nassau in the Channel Fleet under Sir John Norris, and in 1742–4 was with Norris as captain of the fleet. On 19 June 1744 he was promoted to be rear-admiral of the white, and in the following winter commanded a squadron cruising in the Channel Soundings for the protection of trade.

On 23 April 1745 Medley was promoted to be vice-admiral, and sent out as commander-in-chief of the Mediterranean Fleet. The service was one of blockade and co-operation with the allied armies in the War of the Austrian Succession, who in the winter of 1746–7 invaded Provence; but, after an unsuccessful attack on Antibes, they were obliged to retreat.

On 15 July 1747 Medley was advanced to be Vice-Admiral of the Red. He died, probably not knowing of the promotion, on board the 80-gun HMS Russell, at Vado Ligure, on 5 August 1747.

George Rodney served with him on two ships at the beginning of his career with Medley acting as a mentor to the younger man.

A monument in Medley's memory, sculpted by Henry Cheere, was placed in York Minster three months after his death.

== Notes ==
a. Some sources indicate that the governor in 1740 was Lord George Graham. There is no evidence to support this appointment.

== Citations ==
Political offices
Preceded by Philip Vanbrugh	Commodore Governor of Newfoundland; 1739–1740	Succeeded by Thomas Smith
