= Robert Hughes (Royal Navy officer, died 1729) =

Royal Navy officer

Rear-Admiral Robert Hughes
- Died: 14 March 1729; London, England
- Burial place: St Paul's, Deptford, England
- Children: 2
- Relatives: Sir Richard Hughes (nephew); Sir Robert Calder (grandson)
- Military career
- Allegiance: Kingdom of Great Britain
- Branch: Royal Navy
- Service years: c.1692–1729
- Rank: Rear-Admiral
- Commands: HMS Flamborough; HMS Winchester; HMS Poole; HMS Kent; HMS Plymouth; HMS Devonshire; HMS Hampton Court
- Conflicts: Nine Years' War; War of the Spanish Succession

Rear-Admiral Robert Hughes (died 14 March 1729) was a Royal Navy officer. Having joined the navy in the late seventeenth century, he served as a lieutenant in several ships of the line during the Nine Years' War before being promoted to captain in 1697. His first command was HMS Flamborough in which he captured several privateers off Dunkirk at the start of the War of the Spanish Succession, before taking command of HMS Winchester.

Hughes commanded a squadron guarding the Straits of Gibraltar in 1703, and in the following decade commanded several ships of the line in the Mediterranean Sea and English Channel. Promoted to rear-admiral in 1727, Hughes was third in command of the Baltic Fleet that later in the year induced Russia not to go to war with Sweden. He died in 1729, having had no further active service.

== Naval service ==
=== Early career ===
Robert Hughes was born in the late seventeenth century. He was the brother of Royal Navy officer Captain Richard Hughes, and as such was the uncle of Captain Sir Richard Hughes, 1st Baronet. Hughes also joined the navy and, with the Nine Years' War ongoing, was promoted to lieutenant on 19 December 1692. The following year he was appointed second lieutenant of the 70-gun ship of the line HMS Suffolk. Hughes' early career is not well recorded, but by 1695 he was serving as the first lieutenant of the 100-gun ship of the line HMS Queen, which was the flagship of Admiral Sir Cloudesley Shovell. Sometime after this Hughes was promoted to commander before, on 28 June 1697, being advanced in rank to captain.

=== Command ===
At the same time as his promotion to captain Hughes was given command of the 24-gun sixth-rate HMS Flamborough; he continued in the ship after the end of the Nine Years' War later in the year. The following year, the ship sailed as escort to a convoy travelling through the White Sea, before in 1699 serving off the coast of Ireland. Flamborough then saw service guarding the Great Yarmouth fisheries in 1701, with the War of the Spanish Succession beginning in the same year. At this point Flamborough was sent to serve as a cruiser in the North Sea. Hughes captured several small but successful privateers around Dunkirk in 1702, demonstrating "great activity and diligence" according to biographer John Charnock.

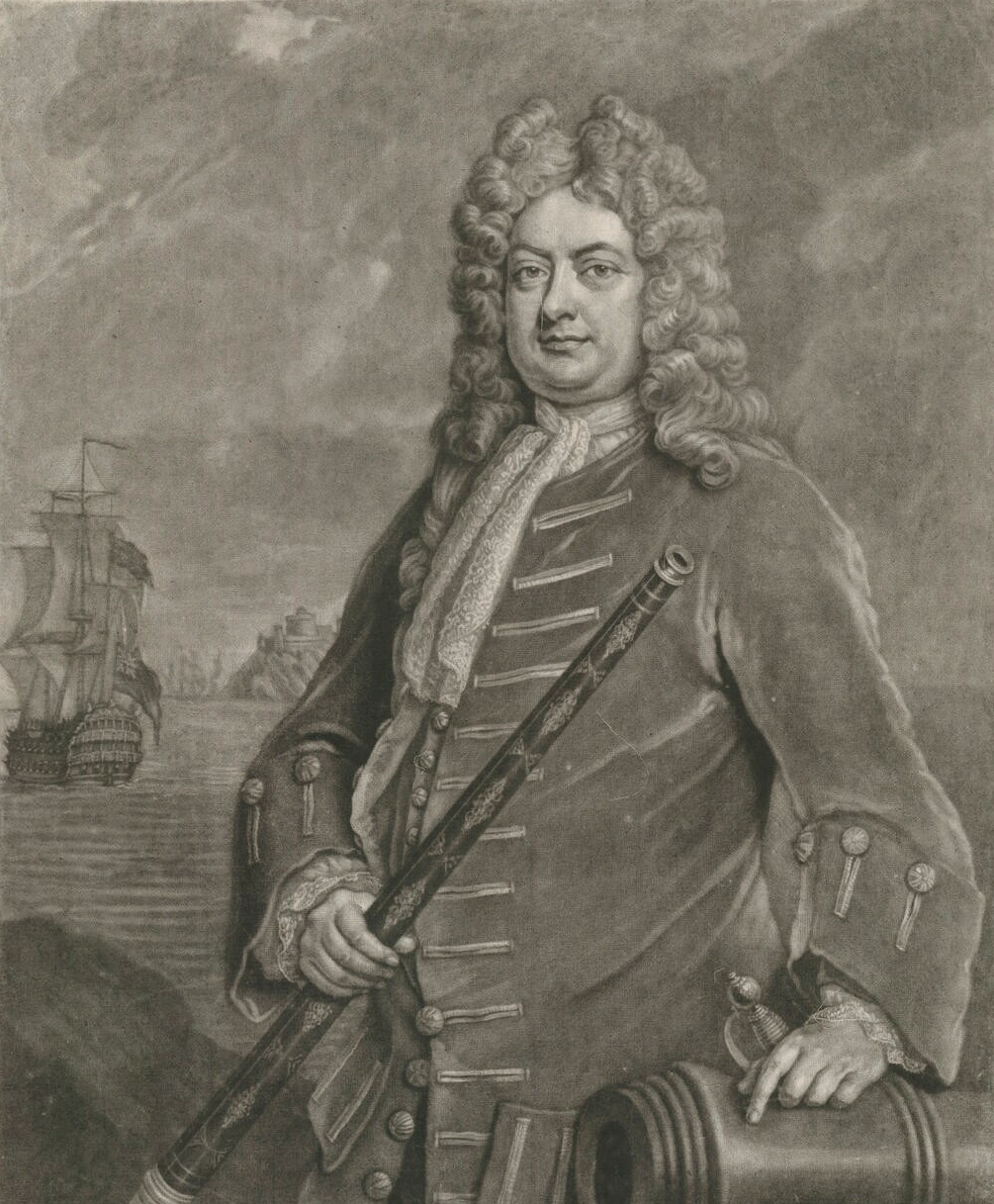
Sir Thomas Hardy, whose flagship Hughes commanded between 1711 and 1715

Towards the end of the year Hughes was transferred to command the 50-gun ship of the line HMS Winchester, which in 1703 joined the Mediterranean Fleet commanded by Shovell. By September, still in the Mediterranean, Hughes had moved to command the 32-gun frigate HMS Poole, but, the fleet then returning to England, in 1704 he re-joined Winchester. The ship joined Rear-Admiral William Whetstone's squadron in the English Channel, continuing there into 1705. The following year Hughes and Winchester joined the Mediterranean Fleet, commanded by Shovell and Admiral of the Fleet Sir John Leake. Leake appointed Hughes to serve as a commodore within the fleet, giving him command of a small squadron to guard the entrance to the Straits of Gibraltar. Hughes was highly successful in this task, capturing or destroying two enemy frigates and a settee. He continued off Gibraltar until 1709.

Hughes was at this point moved with Winchester to serve in the English Channel again, and on 27 November captured a privateer from Flushing. In 1711 Hughes was given command of the 70-gun ship of the line HMS Kent, serving in the Channel as the flagship of Rear-Admiral Sir Thomas Hardy. Kent captured the privateer La Revanche on 23 February the following year.

Hughes was moved to command the 60-gun ship of the line HMS Plymouth in 1715, joining Admiral Sir John Norris's Mediterranean Fleet. He continued there until 1717 when he was translated into the 80-gun ship of the line HMS Devonshire. Hughes' subsequent service is unknown until 1726 when he was given command of the 70-gun ship of the line HMS Hampton Court, part of Vice-Admiral Sir Charles Wager's Baltic Fleet.

=== Flag rank ===
Hughes was promoted to rear-admiral on 21 April 1727. (Note: Full dates of promotion: rear-admiral of the blue 21 April 1727, rear-admiral of the white 4 January 1728, rear-admiral of the red 19 July 1728.) He continued serving in Hampton Court, this time as her flag officer rather than captain. Immediately after his promotion Hughes joined a fleet under the command of Norris, serving as third in command. The fleet contained twelve ships of the line, and was expected to travel to the Baltic to induce Russia not to attack Sweden. The fleet reached Copenhagen on 12 May and made such an impression on Russia that it laid up its navy and abandoned designs on Sweden. Hughes and the rest of the fleet subsequently returned to England not having had to fire a single shot in anger. The fleet arrived home in early January 1728; Hughes saw no further active service before on 14 March 1729 he died in London from an infection in his leg. He was buried, as much of his family were, in St Paul's, Deptford.

== Personal life ==
Hughes married a woman named Lydia, with whom he had two daughters who became his co-heiresses. One daughter, Alice, married Sir James Calder, 3rd Baronet. She had four sons, including Admiral Sir Robert Calder. His other daughter, Katherine, married John Sayer and had a son, Vice-Admiral James Sayer.
