= William Adams (Royal Navy officer, died 1748) =

Royal Navy officer

Captain William Adams
- Died: 28 September 1748; Off Pondicherry
- Military career
- Allegiance: Great Britain
- Branch: Royal Navy
- Rank: Post-Captain
- Commands: HMS Harwich
- Conflicts: War of the Austrian Succession; Siege of Pondicherry

William Adams (died 28 September 1748) was an officer of the Royal Navy. He served in the East Indies during the War of the Austrian Succession and was promoted by Admiral Thomas Griffin to be captain of the 50-gun HMS Harwich on 12 March 1748. Adams went on to serve under Admiral Edward Boscawen at the unsuccessful siege of Pondicherry in 1748 during the War of the Austrian Succession. The British fleet cannonaded the town's defences and were in turn fired upon. Little damage and few casualties were sustained on either side, there were only two British fatalities: Adams and a common sailor. After Adam's death, command of Harwich passed to Captain Richard Clements.

== Sources ==
- Charnock's Biographia Navalis
