= France in the Seven Years' War =

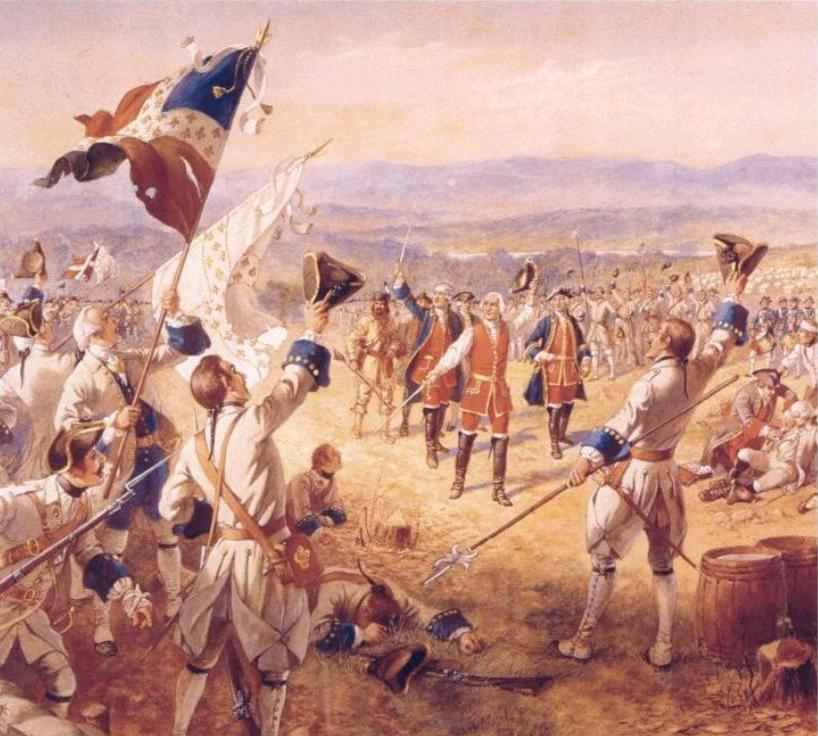
Montcalm after the Battle of Carillon.

France was one of the leading participants in the Seven Years' War, which in fact lasted nine years between 1754 and 1763. France entered the war with the hope of achieving a lasting victory against Prussia, Britain, and their German allies and with the hope of expanding its colonial possessions.

While the first few years of war proved successful for the French, in 1759 the situation reversed and they suffered defeats on several continents. In an effort to reverse their losses, France concluded an alliance with their neighbour, Spain, in 1761. In spite of this the French continued to suffer defeats throughout 1762 eventually forcing them to sue for peace. The 1763 Treaty of Paris confirmed the loss of French possessions in North America and Asia to the British. France also finished the war with very heavy debts, which they struggled to repay for the remainder of the 18th century which later led to the French Revolution in 1789 and the Haitian Revolution in 1791.

== Background ==
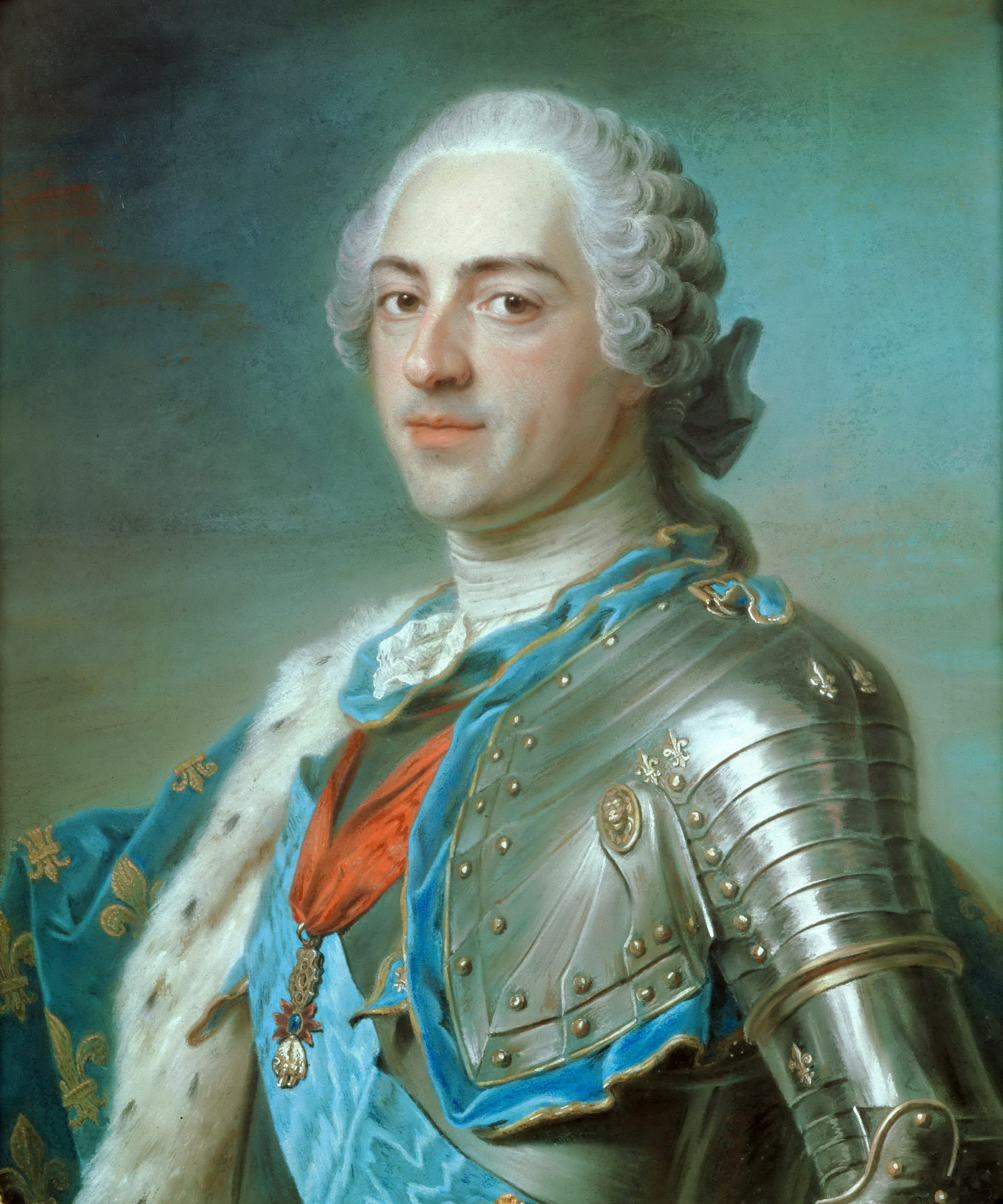
Louis XV ruled France from 1715 to 1774.

The previous major conflict in Europe, the War of the Austrian Succession, ended in 1748 with the Treaty of Aix-la-Chapelle. This peace agreement was very unpopular with the French populace who saw the terms as excessively lenient to France's enemies, specifically Britain and the Dutch Republic, and many regarded it as a breathing space before war resumed.

France and Britain were engaged in an intensifying global rivalry after they superseded Spain as the leading colonial powers. Hoping to establish supremacy, both countries engaged in several minor wars in North America. French colonies in Louisiana, Illinois, and Canada had largely surrounded British colonies strung out in a narrow strip along the coast. All the French needed to totally envelop the British was control of the Ohio Country. Attempting to gain control of this territory, France built a complex system of alliances with the area's Native American tribes and brought them into conflict with Britain.

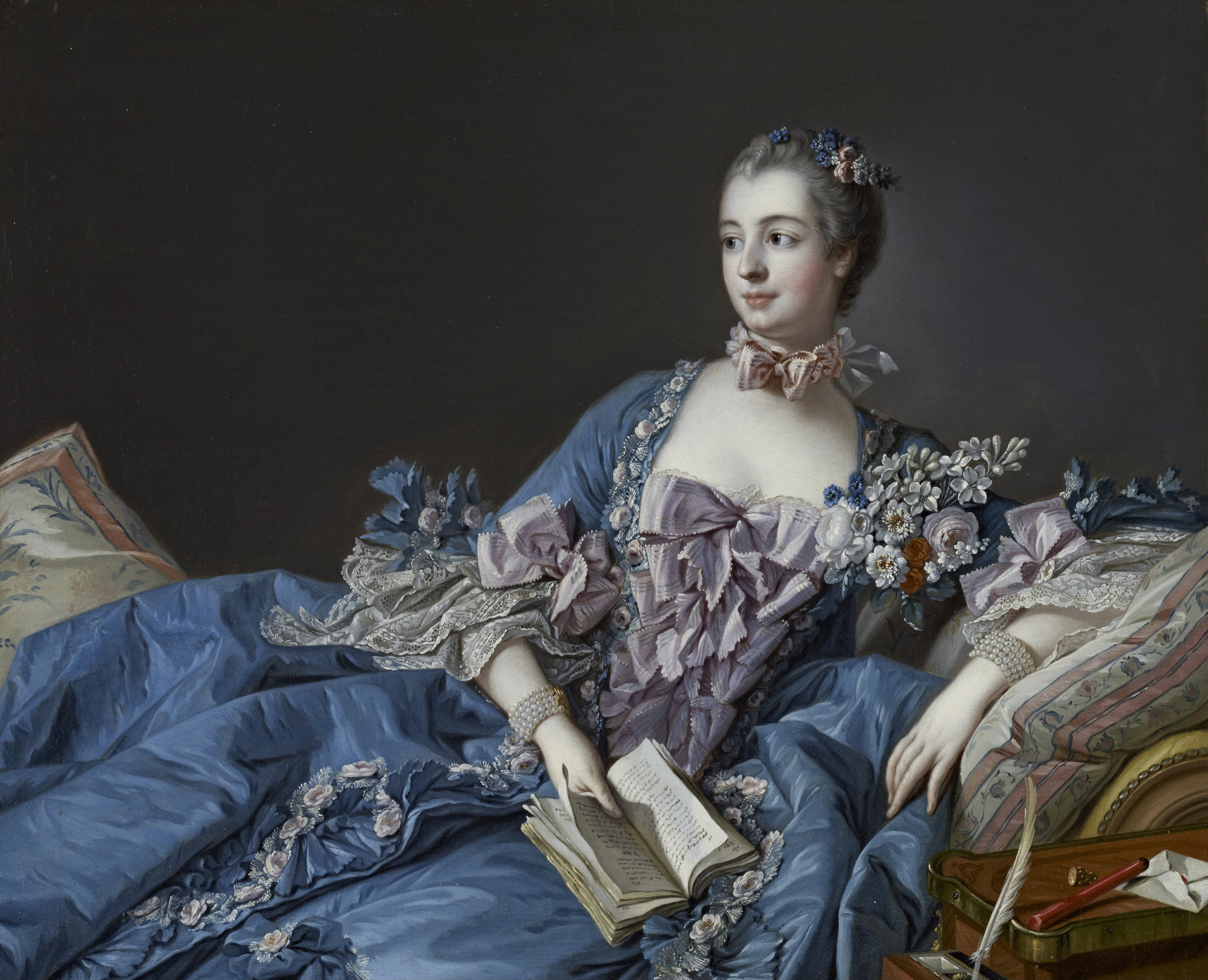
Madame de Pompadour

In the mid-18th century, France was an absolute monarchy: all power resided with the king. Louis XV was a weak personality easily manipulated by his advisors and confidants. Chief amongst them was Madame de Pompadour, his mistress who exercised enormous influence over appointments and matters of grand strategy. Other advisors rose and fell with rapid succession, continuing the lack of stability which had plagued the monarchy in the early 18th century.

== War in Europe ==
While the war began in North America, in 1756 France became drawn into a major war in Europe. Allied to Austria, Sweden and Russia the French tried to defeat the Prussians who had only the British as major allies. Despite repeated attempts between 1757 and 1762, the French and their allies failed to win the conclusive victory against Prussia despite a constant war of attrition. They were partly frustrated by an army led by Duke Ferdinand of Brunswick made up of British forces and troops from the smaller German states which operated in western Germany.

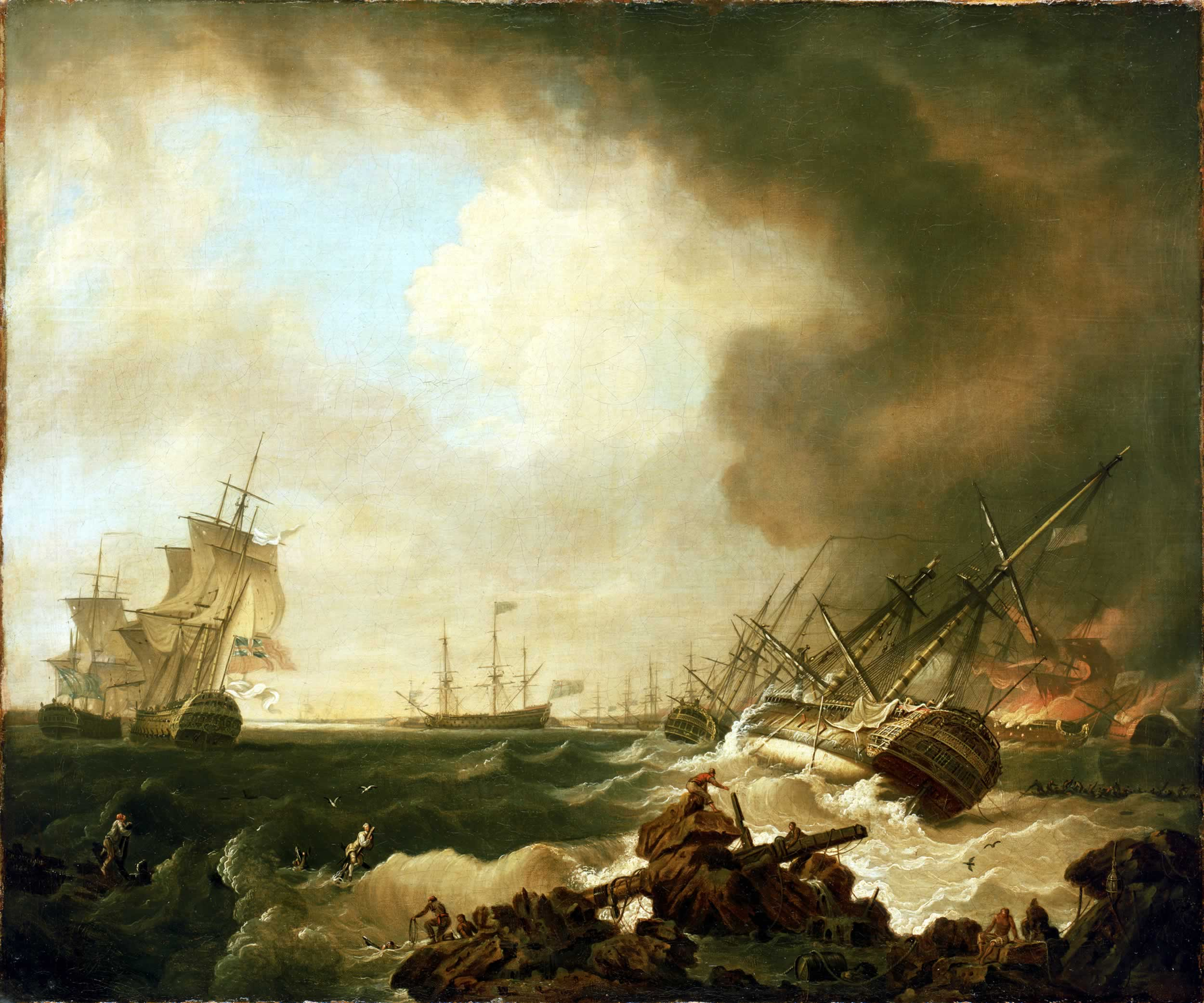
The Battle of Quiberon Bay in November 1759 destroyed French hopes of invading Britain

France had opened the war against Britain in Europe by capturing Menorca and until 1759 they believed they held the upper hand. The British Royal Navy, however, had initiated a tight blockade of the French coast which prevented supplies and troops moving freely and sapped morale. Realizing that Prussia was unlikely to be defeated until its ally Britain was, the French foreign minister, Étienne François, duc de Choiseul developed a plan to invade Britain in three separate places at Portsmouth, Essex and Scotland. He oversaw the construction of a massive fleet of transports to convey the troops during 1759. Defeats of the French Navy at Lagos and Quiberon Bay put an end to these plans and he was forced to call off the invasion in the late autumn. A diversionary force under François Thurot had managed to land in Northern Ireland before he was hunted down and killed by the British navy. In the wake of the disaster at Quiberon, Thurot was lionised as a hero in France.

By this stage France's finances were in a poor state, despite the efforts of Étienne de Silhouette to keep down expenditure, and France was only kept afloat by a major loan from neutral Spain. Despite the Spanish government's official policy of neutrality, they were slowly shifting towards supporting an outright pro-French position, encouraged by Choiseul. In December 1761, war finally broke out between Britain and Spain – but the Spanish involvement did not provide the relief to the French that had been hoped. Instead French troops were needed to bolster Spanish efforts to invade Portugal, and became bogged down there. Spain also suffered defeats in Cuba and the Philippines in 1762, and by the end of the year both Spain and France were urgently seeking peace.

== War in North America ==
France began asserting control over the Ohio Country as early as 1749, issuing warnings and threats to British colonial traders active in the region. When the French began constructing a series of forts in the Ohio River watershed in 1754, the British responded with claims and demands of their own. In 1754, George Washington sparked the beginning of the war with an attack on a French scouting party near present-day Pittsburgh, Pennsylvania. When they learned that the British were planning to send regular army troops to the area for the 1755 campaign, the French sent a large body of troops to New France before the British could blockade their ports. These troops, combined with a strong alliances with native tribes and poor British military administration, gave France a string of victories from 1755 to 1757; its only significant loss was Acadia, whose remaining territories fell into British hands after the 1755 Battle of Fort Beauséjour, inaugurating the expulsion of the Acadians. France was able to maintain control of the Ohio Country as well as the strategically important Great Lakes. After their initial successes in North America, however, France began to starve the theatre of forces and supplies, preferring to concentrate on the war in Europe rather than risk large numbers of troops on expeditions across the British-dominated Atlantic Ocean.

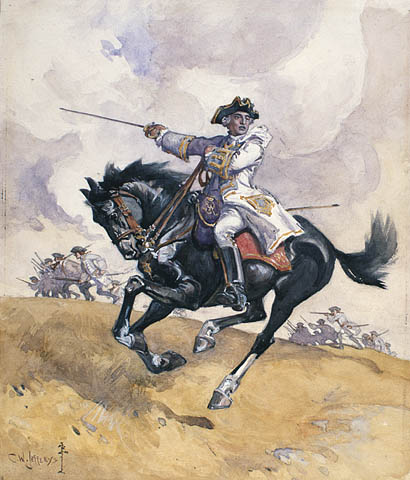
Montcalm leading his troops into battle during the failed attempt to defend Quebec in 1759.

This contrasted sharply with the British, who put great emphasis on the war for control of North America. In 1758 the British launched several major offensives, capturing Louisbourg, Fort Duquesne, and Fort Frontenac, although they were stopped at Fort Carillon. The following year a large force under General Jeffery Amherst took Carillon and Fort Niagara, while a second large force under General James Wolfe sailed up the St Lawrence River to besiege Quebec City. The French commander in Quebec, Louis-Joseph de Montcalm, had orders to try to hold out until the winter spell, with the promise that major reinforcements would arrive from Europe the following year. Montcalm almost achieved this, delaying British attempts to capture Quebec until the autumn, when the British finally won the Battle of Quebec and captured the city. In spite of this, a large force of French escaped westwards, intent on resuming the campaign the following year.

In 1760 the French launched a surprise effort to re-capture Quebec, which succeeded in blunting one British advance on Montreal. Other British armies advanced on Montreal from the south and west, completing the Conquest of Canada. In the West Indies the French saw the valuable sugar islands of Guadeloupe and Martinique captured by British forces. A final attempt to capture Newfoundland from the British failed in late 1762.

== War in Asia ==
The French position in India had been severely weakened following the Second Carnatic War, which had ended in 1754 with the Treaty of Pondicherry. In spite of this they held several strong trading posts, particularly that at Pondicherry and they maintained relations with several major Indian princes who were also enemies of the British.

The French war in India started badly, with the loss of the Chandalore which saw the last French trading post in Bengal destroyed. A major French force under the Comte De Lally was despatched from Europe, and it threatened to turn the balance in India. However, an attempt to seize Madras failed, while Lally's force was unable to prevent the eventual British capture of Pondicherry and a comprehensive British victory in India. In the wake of Britain's domination of India, they were able to launch an expedition from Madras to the Philippines which captured Manila from France's ally Spain – further weakening the Bourbon position in Asia.

The Mughals led by Shah Alam II were joined by Jean Law and 200 Frenchmen and waged a campaign against the British during the Seven Years' War. Jean Law's Memoire: Mémoires sur quelques affaires de l’Empire Mogol 1756-1761 contains detailed information about the campaign of the Mughal Emperor Shah Alam II and his French allies against the British East India Company.

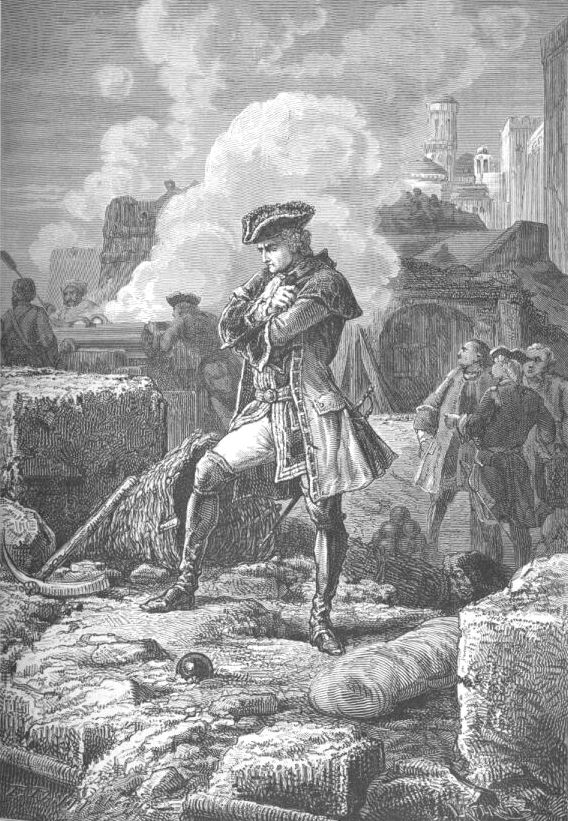
Lally at Pondicherry.

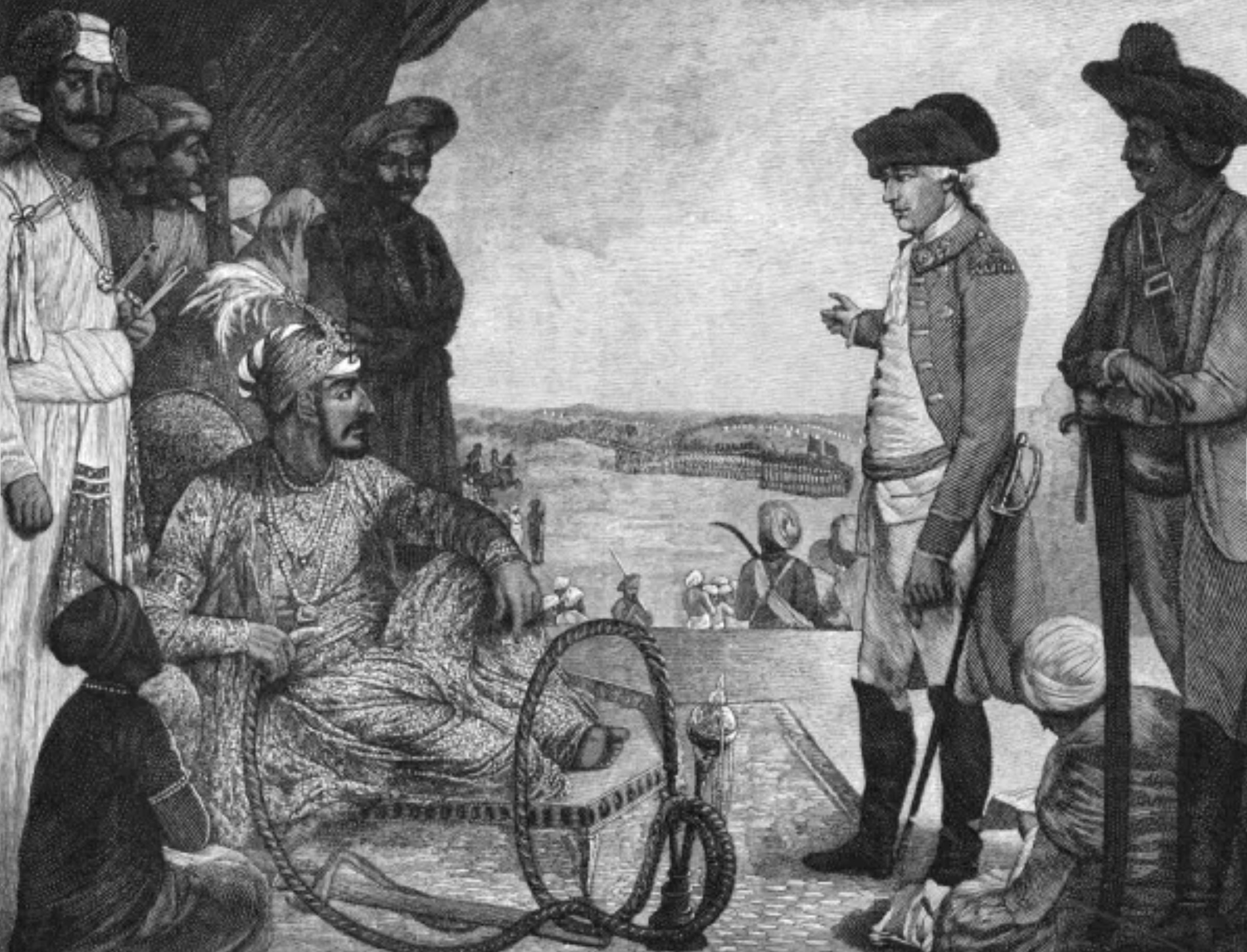
Shah Alam II.

== War in Africa ==
In April 1758 a British expedition conceived by the merchant Thomas Cumming and authorised by William Pitt captured the French settlement of Saint-Louis in Senegal. The scheme had been so successful and profitable that two further expeditions were despatched the same year which captured the island of Gorée and the French trading station on the Gambia.

The loss of these valuable colonies further weakened France's finances. In 1762 a force was prepared to retake the Senegal territories, but had to be abandoned.

== Peace treaty and aftermath ==
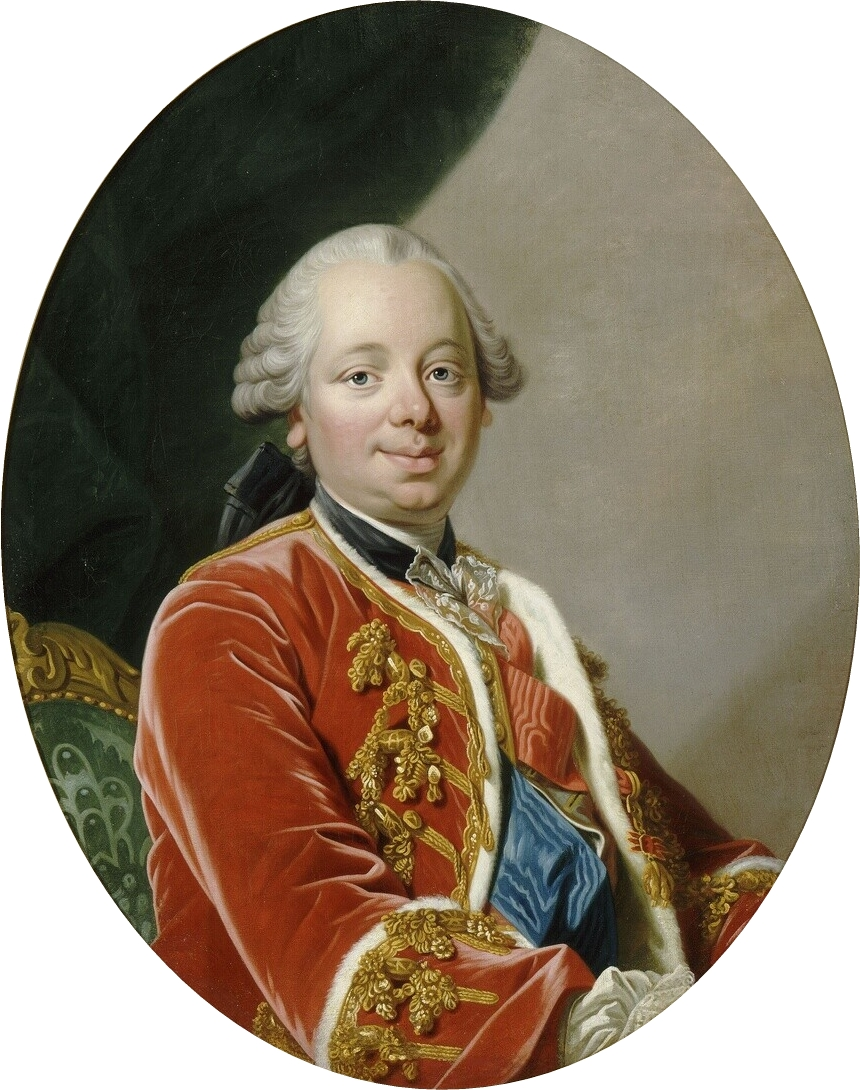
Étienne François, duc de Choiseul took much of the blame for the French defeat in the war, although he later masterminded French successes in the American War of Independence.

The French began negotiations in Paris in late 1762. Because of a change in the British government, they were offered more lenient terms than might otherwise have been expected. While they lost Canada to the British, Martinique and Guadeloupe were returned to them in exchange for Menorca.

The French defeat had a devastating impact on French political life, and a number of senior figures were forced out of public office. Realizing the deficiency in the French navy, Louis XV began a massive rebuilding program to match British naval strength. Choiseul drew up a long-term plan to gain victory over the British which was partially put into action during the American War of Independence after France joined the conflict in 1778, as did its ally Spain.

== See also ==
- Great Britain in the Seven Years' War
- France in the American Revolutionary War

== Bibliography ==
- Anderson, Fred. Crucible of War: The Seven Years' War and the Fate of Empire in British North America, 1754–1766. Faber and Faber, 2001.
- Anderson, Fred and Cayton, Andrew. The Dominion of War: Empire and Liberty in North America 1500–2000. Penguin Books, 2005.
- Black, Jeremy. Pitt the Elder. Cambridge University Press, 1992.
- Browning, Reed. The Duke of Newcastle. Yale University Press, 1975.
- Harvey, Robert. Clive: The Life and Death of a British Emperor. Sceptre, 1998.
- Horne, Alastair. Friend or Foe: An Anglo-Saxon History of France. Phoenix, 2005.
- Longmate, Norman. Island Fortress: The Defence of Great Britain, 1603–1945. Harper Collins, 1993.
- McLynn, Frank. 1759: The Year Britain Became Master of the World. Pimlico, 2005.
- Palmer, Alan. Northern Shores: A History of the Baltic Sea and its peoples. John Murrtay, 2006.
- Simms, Brendan. Three Victories and a Defeat: The Rise and Fall of the First British Empire. Penguin Books, 2008.
