= Calders (disambiguation) =

Calders is a municipality in Catalonia, Spain

Calders may also refer to:

- Calders (Yorkshire Dales), hill in England
- The Calders, housing estate in Edinburgh, Scotland
- East Calder, Mid Calder and West Calder, towns in West Lothian, Scotland; "The Calders"

== See also ==
- Calder (disambiguation)
