= SS Calder =

SS Calder is the name of the following ships:

- SS Calder, wrecked in a typhoon and towed back to Hong Kong for repairs on 1 September 1848
- SS Calder (1887), scrapped in 1926

== See also ==
- Calder (disambiguation)
