= HMS Flamborough (1697) =

Ship of the line of the Royal Navy

History

England
- Name: HMS Flamborough
- Ordered: 24 December 1696
- Builder: Royal Dockyard, Chatham
- Launched: 10 July 1697
- Commissioned: 26 June 1697
- Captured: 10 October 1705
- Fate: Captured by French and scuttled

General characteristics
- Type: 20-gun sixth rate
- Tons burthen: 251 85/94 bm
- Length: 94 ft 0 in (28.7 m) gundeck; 77 ft 10 in (23.7 m) keel for tonnage
- Beam: 24 ft 8 in (7.5 m) for tonnage
- Depth of hold: 10 ft 4 in (3.1 m)
- Armament: initially as ordered; 20 × sakers on wooden trucks (UD); 4 × 3-pdr on wooden trucks (QD); 1703 Establishment; 20 × 6-pdrs on wooden trucks (UD); 4 × 4-pdr on wooden trucks (QD)

HMS Flamborough was a member of the standardized 20-gun sixth rates built at the end of the 17th century. She was commissioned for service in Home waters, then Mediterranean. She was captured by the French in 1705 and scuttled.

Flamborough was the first ship to bear this name in the Royal Navy.

== Construction ==
She was ordered in the Fourth Batch of four ships from Chatham Dockyard to be built under the guidance of their Master Shipwright, Robert Lee. She was launched on 10 July 1697.

== Commissioned service ==
She was commissione on 28 June 1697 under Captain Robert Hughes. She escorted the White Sea convoy in 1698. In 1699 she patrolled Irish waters.in 1701 she was assigned to the Yarmouth fishery. She was with Rooke's Fleet in 1702. Captain Josiah Mighells, RN, became her commander on 31 March 1703 assigned to Shovell's fleet and went to the Mediterranean. 1705 her commander was Captain John Hooper, RN.

== Loss ==
HMS Flamborough was captured by the French 50-gun Le Jason off Cape Spartel, Morocco on 10 October 1705 and scuttled.
