= Calder baronets of Muirton (1686) =

Escutcheon of the Calder baronets of Muirton

The Calder baronetcy, of Muirton in the County of Moray, was created in the Baronetage of Nova Scotia on 5 November 1686 for James Calder, a supporter of James II and VII, Member of the Parliament of Scotland for Elgin from 1669 to 1672. The baronetcy became either extinct or dormant on the death of the 6th Baronet in 1887. It does not appear on the Official Roll.

== Calder baronets, of Muirton (1686) ==
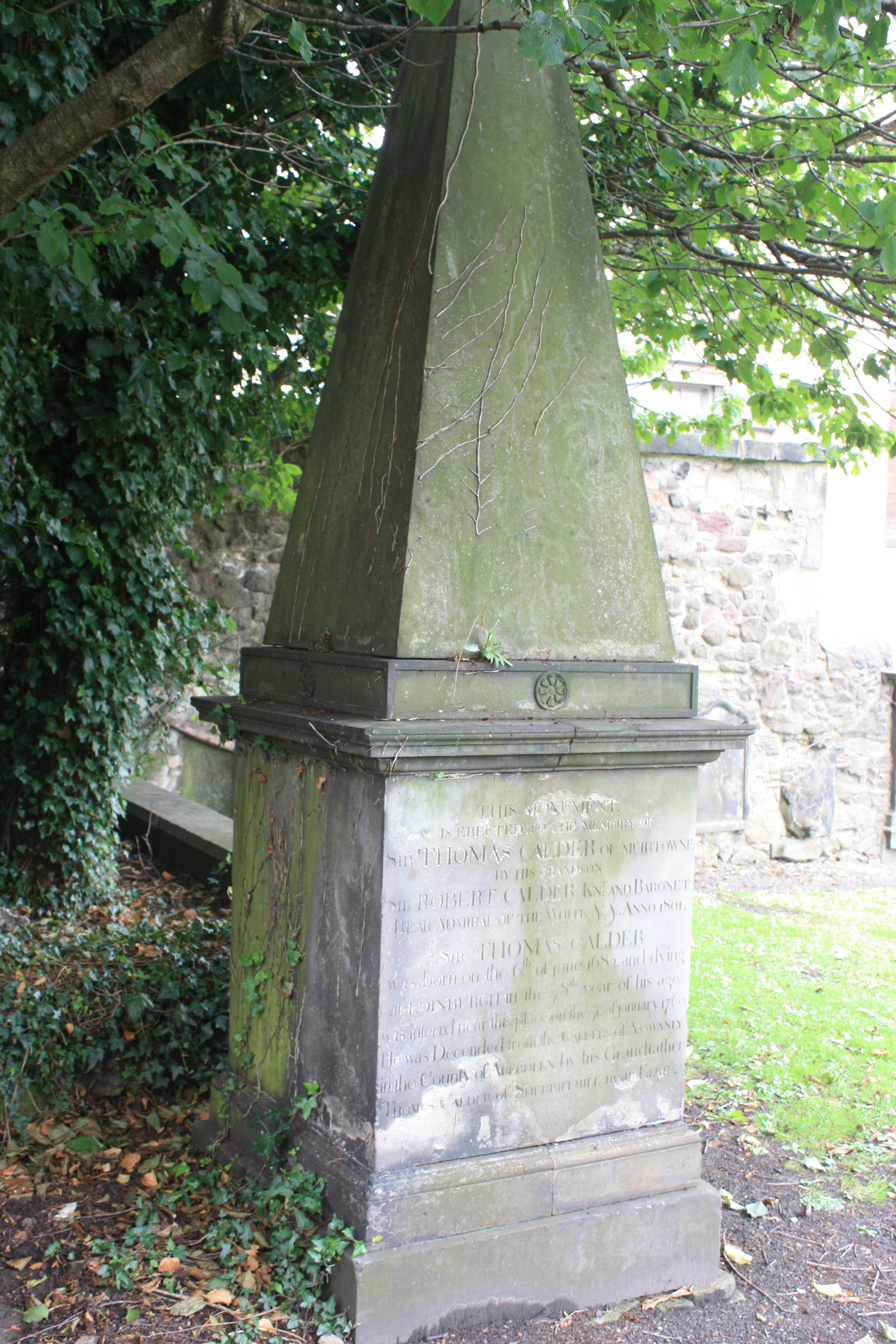
The grave of Sir Thomas Calder, Canongate Kirkyard, Edinburgh, erected by his grandson Admiral Sir Robert Calder

- Sir James Calder, 1st Baronet (1657–1711)
- Sir Thomas Calder, 2nd Baronet (1682–1760)
- Sir James Calder, 3rd Baronet (1712–1774)
- Major General Sir Henry Calder, 4th Baronet (1743–1792)
- Sir Henry Roddam Calder, 5th Baronet (1790–1868)
- Sir William Henry Walsingham Calder, 6th Baronet (1821–1887)
