= HMS Poole (1696) =

History

England
- Name: HMS Poole
- Ordered: 5 June 1695
- Builder: Joseph Nye & George Moore, East Cowes
- Launched: 6 August 1696
- Commissioned: 1696
- Fate: Sunk as a breakwater, 8 July 1737

General characteristics as built
- Class & type: 32-gun fifth rate
- Tons burthen: 38143/94 tons (bm)
- Length: 108 ft 6 in (33.07 m) gundeck; 90 ft 1.5 in (27.47 m) keel for tonnage
- Beam: 28 ft 2.5 in (8.60 m)
- Depth of hold: 10 ft 7 in (3.23 m)
- Propulsion: Sails
- Sail plan: Full-rigged ship
- Complement: 145/110
- Armament: as built 32 guns; 4/4 × demi-culverins on lower deck; 22/20 × 6-pdr guns on upper deck; 6/4 × 4-pdr guns on quarter deck

HMS Poole was a 32-gun fifth-rate built by Joseph Nye & George Moore of East Cowes on the Isle of Wight in 1695/96. She spent the first part of her career on trade protection and counter-piracy patrols. After 1719, she was converted to a fireship. She was finally sunk as a breakwater at Harwich in July 1737.

She was the first vessel to bear the name Poole in the English and Royal Navy.

== Construction and specifications ==
She was ordered on 5 June 1695 to be built under contract by Joseph Nye & George Moore of East Cowes on the Isle of Wight. She was launched on 6 August 1696. Her dimensions were a gundeck of 108 feet 6 inches (33.07 metres) with a keel of 90 feet 1.5 inches (27.47 metres) for tonnage calculation with a breadth of 28 feet 2.5 inches (8.60 metres) and a depth of hold of 10 feet 7 inches (3.23 metres). Her builder's measure tonnage was calculated as 38143/94 tons (burthen).

The gun armament initially was four demi-culverins (Note: A demi-culverin was a gun of 3,400 pounds with a four-inch bore firing a 9.5-pound shot with an eight-pound powder charge) on the lower deck with two pair of guns per side. The upper deck battery would consist of between twenty and twenty-two 6-pounder guns (Note: A 6-pounder was a Dutch gun used to replace the saker) with ten or eleven guns per side. The gun battery would be completed by four 4-pounder guns (Note: A minion (renamed the 4-pounder) was a gun of 1,000 pounds with a 3.5-inch bore firing a 4-pound shot with a 4-pound powder charge.) on the quarterdeck with two to three guns per side.

== Commissioned service ==
HMS Poole was commissioned during 1696 under the command of Captain James Worthington until he drowned at Harwich on 16 October 1697. He was replaced by Captain John Cranby until his death on 19 December 1702. She sailed with Vice-Admiral Matthew Aylmer's Fleet to the Mediterranean for the suppression of piracy. With the Fleet, they were off Lisbon in 1698, then sailed into the Mediterranean in 1699, patrolling off Tunis, Tripoli, and Algiers. She was off Cape Verde in 1700. She returned to home waters and patrolled off Dunkirk in the summer of 1701 as part of Captain Basil Beaumont's Squadron. In September 1703, she was under Captain Robert Hughes when she sailed to the Mediterranean. She returned to home waters and patrolled in the North Sea in 1704. In 1705, she was under the command of Captain Edward Windsor, patrolling off Guinea. Around October 1706, she was under Captain Galfridus Walpole until 1709. She was sailing with Hardy's squadron to the Mediterranean in 1708. She joined Sir George Byng's Fleet in 1709. In 1711, Captain William Gray was in command patrolling in Irish waters.

She was converted to a fireship of 8 guns with a crew of 50 personnel at Portsmouth by Admiralty Order on 14 April 1719 at a cost of £1,615.19.0.75d (Note: Approximately £299,300 today, adjusted for inflation) from April to August 1719. She was recommissioned in 1719 under the command of Commander Isaac Townsend, followed by Commander Henry Medley in February 1720 for service in the Baltic Sea with Sir John Norris's Fleet. They sailed to the Baltic on 16 April and returned on 20 October 1720. Around February 1721, she was under Commander John Trevor in the Baltic Sea. She returned and was surveyed in January 1722. She underwent a great repair at Deptford from February 1723 to April 1724 at a cost of £3,517.9.9d. (Note: Approximately £652,000 today, adjusted for inflation) She was recommissioned around February 1726 under Commander William Hervey (promoted to captain in June 1727) to sail with Sir Charles Wager's Fleet to the Baltic. The Fleet returned to home waters, anchoring at Gunfleet on 1 November 1726 without having fired a shot in anger. She again was fitted as a fireship for £1,592.0.4d (Note: Approximately £295,100 today, adjusted for inflation) cost to the hull only between April and May 1729. She was recommissioned around February 1734 under the command of Commander Gilbert Wallis for service with Sir John Norris's Fleet. The Fleet was off the Tagus by Lisbon, Portugal, in 1735 to subdue Spanish hostile action against Portugal. In March 1737, she came under Commander John Forbes. She was again converted to a fireship for £840.19.1.25d (Note: Approximately £155,700 today, adjusted for inflation) by Admiralty Order 18 February 1737.

== Disposition ==
She was sunk as a breakwater at Harwich under Admiralty Order on 8 July 1737.
