= Henry Calder (English cricketer) =

English cricketer

Personal information
- Full name: Henry Calder
- Born: 14 April 1858; South Stoneham, Hampshire, England
- Died: 2 May 1938 (aged 80); Southampton, Hampshire, England
- Batting: Right-handed
- Bowling: Right-arm off break
- Relatives: Harry Calder (son)

Domestic team information
- Years: Team
- 1882–1885: Hampshire
- 1892/93–1894/95: Western Province
- 1896/97: Eastern Province

Career statistics
Competition	First-class
Matches	10
Runs scored	288
Batting average	16.94
100s/50s	–/–
Top score	44
Balls bowled	410
Wickets	10
Bowling average	22.20
5 wickets in innings	–
10 wickets in match	–
Best bowling	3/24
Catches/stumpings	5/–
- Source: Cricinfo, 26 January 2010

Henry Calder (14 April 1858 – 2 May 1938) was an English first-class cricketer who played first-class cricket in both England and South Africa.

Calder was born in April 1858 at South Stoneham, Hampshire; his family could trace its history back to the famous Hambledon Club. He made his debut in first-class cricket for Hampshire County Cricket Club against Sussex at Hove in 1882. He next played for Hampshire in 1885, a season in which he made four first-class appearances. Following the loss of Hampshire's first-class status after the 1885 season, Calder continued to play second-class cricket for Hampshire until 1888. He later toured South Africa in 1891–92 with a team led by Walter Read, but did not feature in any of the matches that were retrospectively given Test status.

Shortly thereafter, Calder emigrated to South Africa, where in the 1892–93 Currie Cup he played two first-class matches for Western Province against Transvaal and Griqualand West. He captained Western Province in the final of the 1894–95 Currie Cup against Transvaal, which Western Province lost by 58 runs. He later made two first-class appearances for Eastern Province in the 1896–97 Currie Cup. In ten first-class matches, Calder scored 288 runs at an average of 16.94, with a highest score of 44. With his off break bowling, he took 10 wickets at a bowling average of 22.50, with best figures of 3 for 34. In South Africa, he had a son, Harry, who was named one of the five Wisden Cricketers of the Year in 1918.

Calder later returned to England, but emigrated back to South Africa with his family in 1921. There he tried to encourage Harry to join The Wanderers Club and pursue a career in first-class cricket, but to no avail. An accountant by profession, Calder died in Southampton in May 1938.
