= John Calder (minister) =

Scottish dissenting minister and author

John Calder D.D. (1733–1815) was a Scottish dissenting minister and author.

== Life ==
He was a native of Aberdeen, and educated at the university there. The Duke of Northumberland employed him as private secretary, both at Alnwick Castle and in London. Subsequently he for some time had charge of Dr. Williams's Library, and he also acted as minister at a meeting-house near the Tower of London. He then became a professional writer.

Around 1789 Calder moved from Furnival's Inn to Croydon, where he knew the scholar East Apthorp well enough to send John Nichols details which were inserted in Literary Anecdotes. He was a collector with an extensive library, and a large cabinet of Greek and Roman coins. His last years were spent at Lisson Grove, London, where he died 10 June 1815.

== Works ==
When a new edition of the Cyclopædia of Ephraim Chambers was proposed, Calder was engaged as provisional editor, drew up a plan, and wrote some articles. Samuel Johnson who was involved in the project disliked the prolix style. In the discussion which ensued with the publisher William Strahan, Calder offended Johnson and was deprived of the editorship, which went to Abraham Rees.

In 1776 Calder drew up a plan of a periodical work called the Selector. He also projected a Foreign Intelligencer. While at Alnwick he made the acquaintance of Thomas Percy whom he assisted in preparing a new edition of the Tatler, Spectator, and Guardian, with notes and illustrations. When Calder moved to London, the materials collected by Percy were passed on to him, and later used in editions of these works published by John Nichols, especially the Tatler published in 6 volumes in 1786, in which "Annotator" means Calder.

In 1789 Nichols translated from the French Pierre François le Courayer's Declaration of his last Sentiments on the different Doctrines of Religion, to which he prefixed a memoir of Courayer. To the new edition of the Biographia Britannica he contributed a long article on the Courten family.
