= HMS Devonshire (1710) =

Ship of the line of the Royal Navy

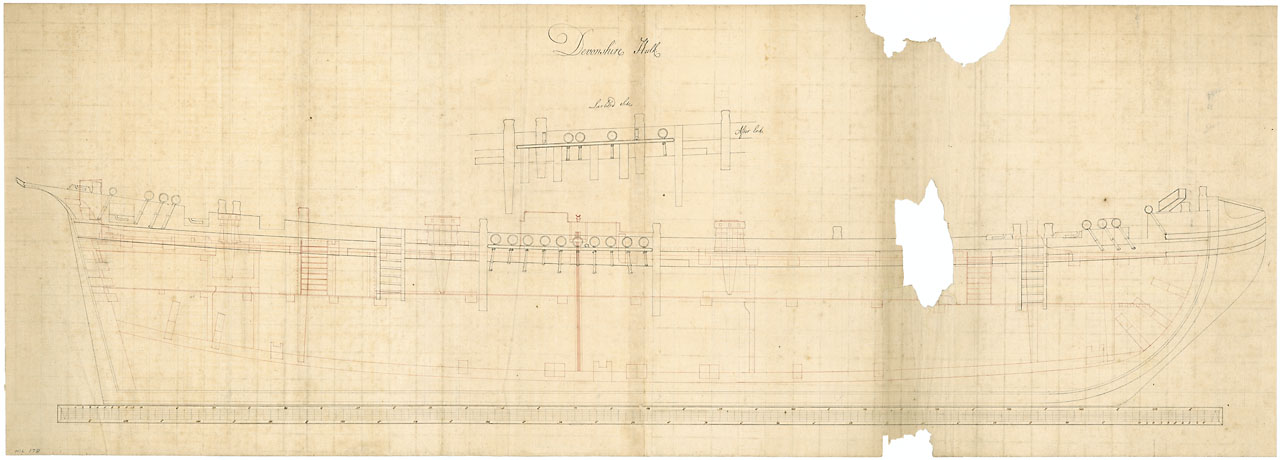
- A plan showing the inboard profile for the Devonshire, as hulked in 1740 at Woolwich Dockyard. Note that she has been cut down to her lower deck.

History

Great Britain
- Name: HMS Devonshire
- Builder: Ackworth, Woolwich Dockyard
- Launched: 12 December 1710
- Fate: Sold, 1760

General characteristics as built
- Class & type: 1706 Establishment 80-gun third rate ship of the line
- Tons burthen: 1,304
- Length: 156 ft (47.5 m) (gundeck)
- Beam: 43 ft 6 in (13.3 m)
- Depth of hold: 17 ft 8 in (5.4 m)
- Propulsion: Sails
- Sail plan: Full-rigged ship
- Armament: 80 guns: Gundeck: 26 × 32-pdrs; Middle gundeck: 26 × 12-pdrs; Upper gundeck: 24 × 6-pdrs; Quarterdeck: 4 × 6-pdrs

HMS Devonshire was a three-deck 80-gun third rate ship of the line of the Royal Navy, built at Woolwich Dockyard and launched on 12 December 1710. Her design was according to the 1706 Establishment of dimensions as laid down for 80-gun ships.

Devonshire was hulked in 1740, and eventually sold out of the navy in 1760.
