= Calder Park =

Calder Park may refer to the following:

- Calder Park, Victoria, a suburb of Melbourne, Australia
  - Calder Park Raceway, a motor racing circuit in Calder Park, Victoria
- Calder Park, Aberdeen, a proposed football stadium in Aberdeen, Scotland
