= Thomas Cumming =

Scottish American merchant

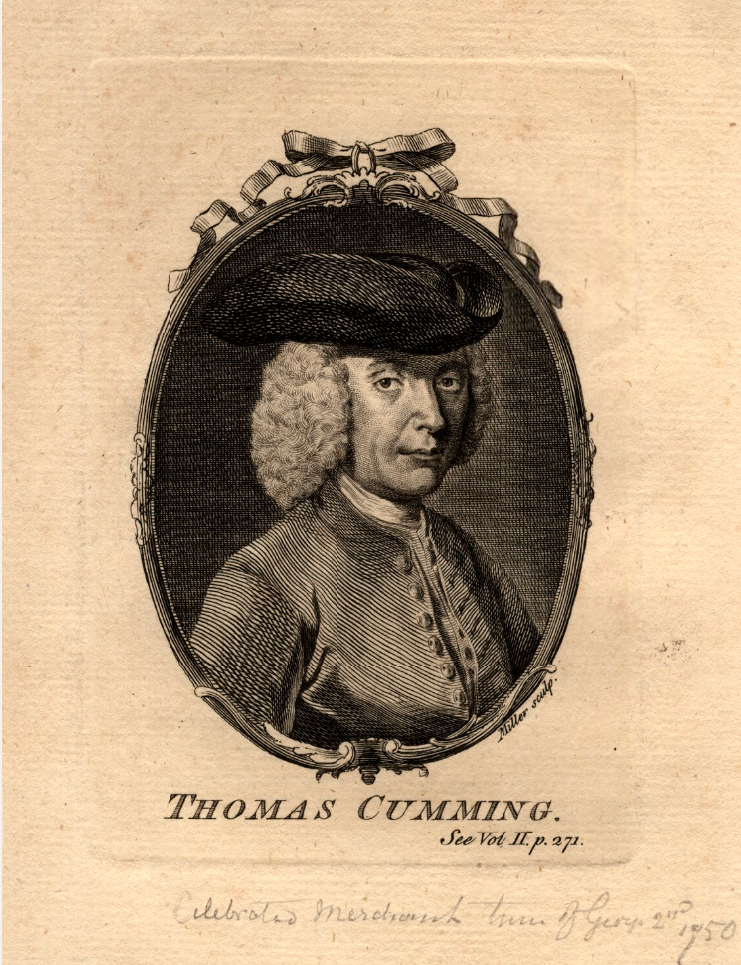
- Thomas Cumming portrait circa 1757 (by John Sebastian Miller)
- Born: Thomas Cumming; 1714; Glasgow, Scotland
- Died: May 29, 1774 (aged 59–60)
- Occupation: Merchant

Thomas Cumming (1714 – May 29, 1774), known as the "Fighting Quaker," was an American merchant who built up a large commercial empire in West Africa. He is best known for the role he played in the 1758 Capture of Senegal in which he submitted a plan to the British war leader William Pitt which advocated an attack on France's valuable but ill-defended African colonies.

Cumming was born in Glasgow, Scotland, and raised as a Quaker, something which later earned him the nickname of the "Fighting Quaker". He later moved to New York City.

== Capture of Senegal ==
Cumming had travelled to West Africa extensively, and was aware of the enormous wealth and future potential of the French colonies along the Sénégal and Gambia rivers. He advocated to William Pitt, the Southern Secretary an expedition to seize these valuable settlements.

Pitt agreed to dispatch a force in 1758 which in April arrived of West Africa. Cumming had gone ahead to meet with local African leaders to try and gain their support for the British attack. He was successful, and a number of African troops assisted the British in capturing the settlement of Saint Louis which fell without firing a shot.

Cumming made a fortune in captured goods which were brought back to London. Particularly valuable were the large amounts of gum arabic which were used by silk-weavers. Pitt was impressed enough to send two further expeditions which led to the capture of the island of Gorée and the French trading station on the Gambia.

== Family and death ==
He died on May 29, 1774.

== Bibliography ==
- Anderson, Fred. Crucible of War: The Seven Years' War and the fate of Empire in British North America, 1754-1766. Faber and Faber, 2000.
- Brown, Peter Douglas. William Pitt, Earl of Chatham: The Great Commoner. George Allen & Unwin, 1978.
