= Calder Houses =

Historic houses in Iowa, United States

- U.S. National Register of Historic Places
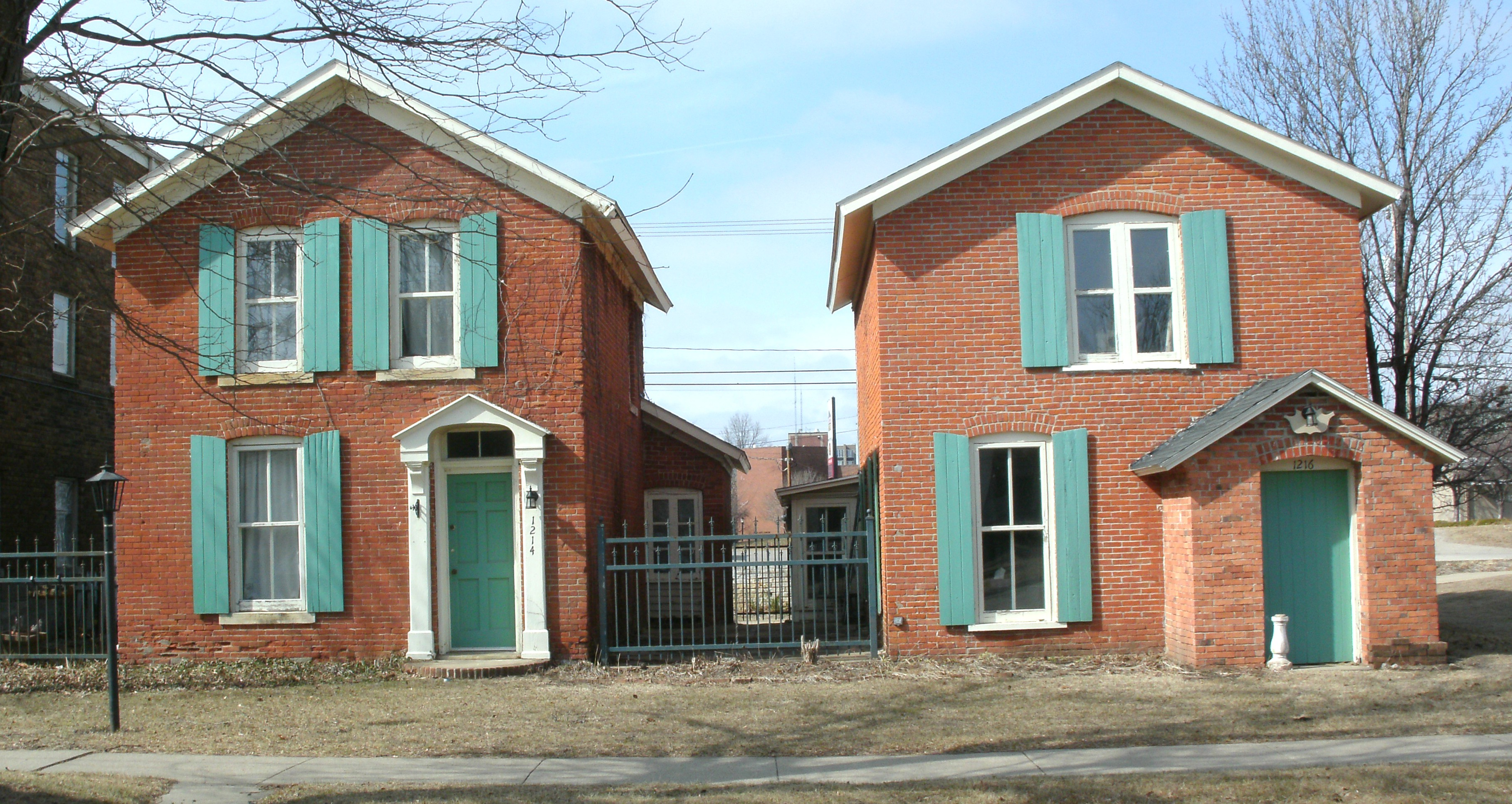

- Location within Iowa Location within the United States
- Location: 1214 and 1216 2nd Ave., SE., Cedar Rapids, Iowa
- Coordinates: 41°59′04″N 91°39′23″W
- Built: 1868
- NRHP reference No.: 78001238

The Calder Houses in Cedar Rapids, Iowa, United States are historic houses that were built in 1868. The two identical houses were built by Charles Calder who moved to Cedar Rapids from the state of New York in 1851. He was involved in real estate and land speculation and at the time of his death in 1890 he held a significant amount of real estate in the city. The houses are two-story front gable cottages. The brick structures are built on stone foundations. They are among the oldest houses in Cedar Rapids. The houses were listed on the National Register of Historic Places in 1978.

== See also ==
- List of the oldest buildings in Iowa
