= Robert Calder (priest) =

Robert Calder (1650?–1723) was a clergyman of the Scottish Episcopal Church, known as an author and controversialist.

== Life ==
Calder was a native of Elgin, born about 1650. He was educated at the university and King's College, Aberdeen. He was presented to the parish of Nenthorn in the presbytery of Kelso in 1689, but on 13 September of that year was deprived for refusing to read the proclamation of the estates declaring William III and Mary II king and queen of England, and for having prayed for King James VII. In 1693, according to his own account, he was for some time imprisoned in the common gaol of Edinburgh for exercising his ministerial functions.

Once free, Calder went to Aberdeen, where he officiated at services in his own house, using the Book of Common Prayer. On the order shortly after the Union of England and Scotland to shut up all the episcopal chapels in Scotland he had to leave Aberdeen, and went to Elgin, where he officiated for some time. To obstruct his celebration of the Lord's Supper on Easter Day 1707, he was summoned before the privy council at Edinburgh on Good Friday. Not complying, he was sentenced to be banished from Elgin under a severe penalty should he return within 12 miles of the city.

Calder then went to Edinburgh, where he officiated to a congregation in Toddrick's Wynd. He engaged in a sharp controversy with the Rev. John Anderson, minister of Dumbarton: he advertised a sermon to prove that Anderson was "one of the grossest liars that ever put pen to paper". He died on 28 May 1723, aged 73.

== Works ==
Calder was the reputed author of Scottish Presbyterian Eloquence displayed, 1693, a collection of citations intended to cast Presbyterian prayers and sermons in a negative light. In 1713 he published Miscellany Numbers relating to the Controversie about the Book of Common Prayer, Episcopal Government, in 40 numbers appearing successively. He was also the author of:

- ‘Three Single Sermons,’ 1701;
- ‘Reasons for Toleration to the Episcopal Clergie’ (anon.), 1703;
- ‘The Divine Right of Episcopacy’ (anon.), 1705;
- ‘Letter to a Nonconformist Minister of the Kirk,’ 1705;
- ‘The Lawfulness and Expediency of Set Forms of Prayer,’ 1706;
- ‘The Lawfulness and Necessitie of observing the Anniversary Fasts and Festivals of the Church maintained,’ by R. C., 1710;
- ‘A Letter to Mr. James Hog of Carnwarth,’ 1710;
- ‘The Countryman's Idea of a Gospel Minister,’ 1711;
- ‘The Spirit of Slander exemplified in a scandalous Pamphlet called the Jacobite Cause,’ 1714;
- ‘The Priesthood of the Old and New Testament by Succession,’ in seven letters, 1716;
- ‘The Second Part … or a Challenge to all that want Episcopal Ordination to prove the validity of their ministerial acts,’ 1717;
- ‘The Anti Counter-querist counter-queried,’ n.d.;
- ‘Queries to the Presbyterians,’ n. d.
