= HMS Nassau (1706) =

British navy warship

- Plan of the 1740 rebuild of Nassau

History

Great Britain
- Name: HMS Nassau
- Builder: Portsmouth Dockyard
- Launched: 9 January 1706
- Fate: Sold, 1770

General characteristics as built
- Class & type: 70-gun third rate ship of the line
- Tons burthen: 1104 tons BM
- Length: 150 ft 6 in (45.9 m) (gundeck)
- Beam: 41 ft (12.5 m)
- Depth of hold: 17 ft 4 in (5.3 m)
- Propulsion: Sails
- Sail plan: Full-rigged ship
- Armament: 70 guns of various weights of shot

General characteristics after 1740 rebuild
- Class & type: 1733 proposals 70-gun third rate ship of the line
- Tons burthen: 1225 tons BM
- Length: 151 ft (46.0 m) (gundeck)
- Beam: 43 ft 5 in (13.2 m)
- Depth of hold: 17 ft 9 in (5.4 m)
- Propulsion: Sails
- Sail plan: Full-rigged ship
- Complement: 410-480
- Armament: 70 guns: Gundeck: 26 × 24-pdrs; Upper gundeck: 26 × 12-pdrs; Quarterdeck: 14 × 6-pdrs; Forecastle: 4 × 6-pdrs

HMS Nassau was a 70-gun third rate ship of the line of the Royal Navy, built at Portsmouth Dockyard and launched on 9 January 1706.

Orders were issued on 25 May 1736 directing Nassau to be taken to pieces and rebuilt according to the 1733 proposals of the 1719 Establishment at Chatham, from where she was relaunched on 25 September 1740.

In February 1747 Nassau was listed as under the command of Captain Holcombe. In May of that year, Nassau captured on passage from Corsica to Genoa two troop transports carrying 210 Spanish and French soldiers and officers.

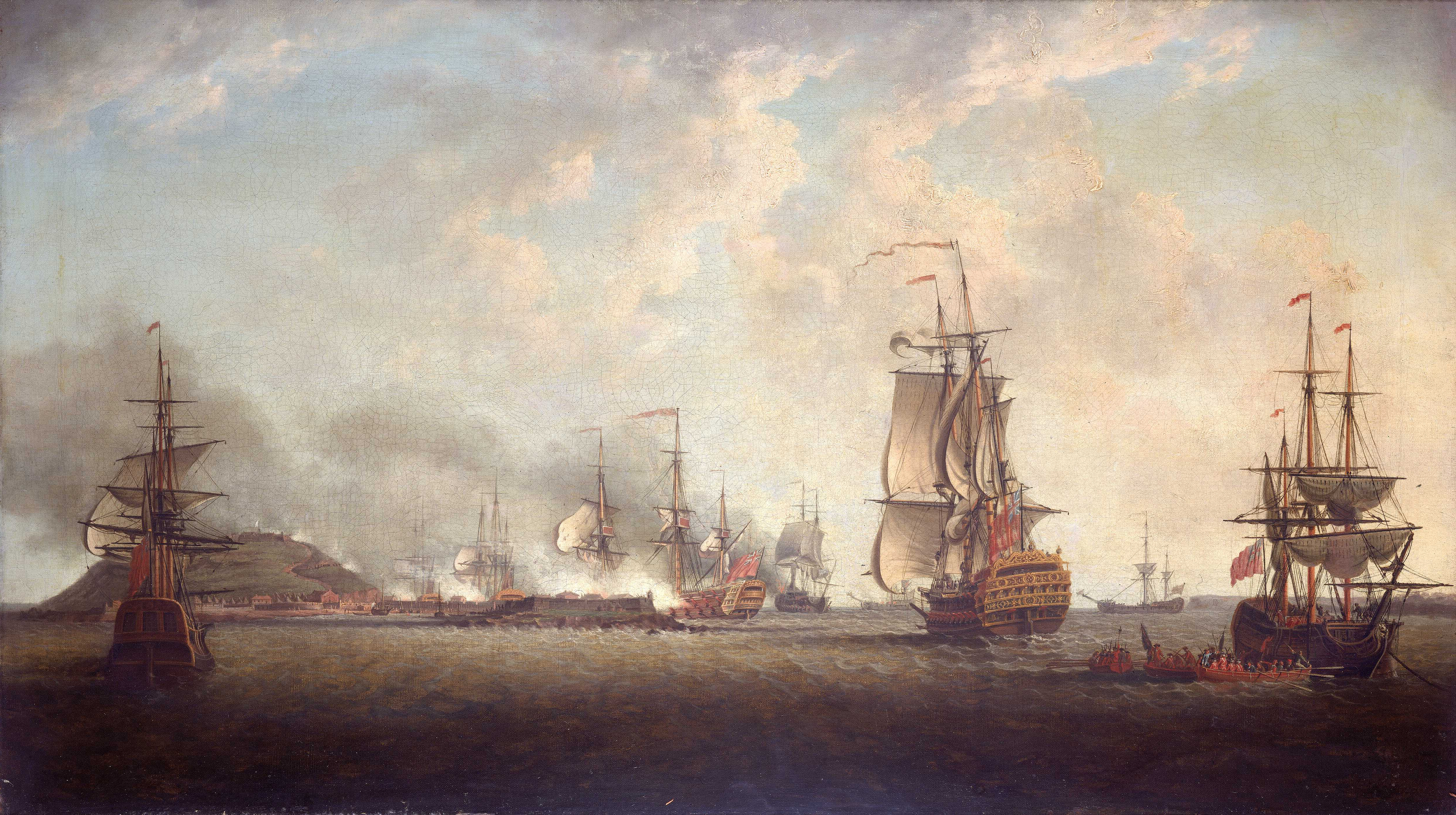
Attack on Gorée, 29 December 1758. Nassau and Dunkirk are on the far side of the fort's mole showing only their upper galleries and spars as they engage the fort's batteries on their port sides

In 1758 she participated in the British Capture of Senegal, captained by Captain James Sayer.

Nassau was sold out of the navy in 1770.
