= Kaldar =

Kaldar may refer to:

- Kaldar, Samangan, a village in Samangan Province, Afghanistan
- Kaldar District, in Balkh Province, Afghanistan
- Kaldar, a fictional world in stories by Edmond Hamilton

== See also ==
- Khaldar, a village in West Azerbaijan Province, Iran
