= Henry Calder (Australian cricketer) =

Australian cricketer

Personal information
- Born: 3 July 1906; Guildford, Western Australia
- Died: 27 August 1970 (aged 64); Perth, Western Australia
- Source: Cricinfo, 26 September 2017

Henry Calder (3 July 1906 – 27 August 1970) was an Australian cricketer. He played his only first-class match in 1932/33, for Western Australia.
