= River Calder =

Calder River or River Calder may refer to:

== Australia ==
- Calder River (Tasmania) in north-west Tasmania
- Calder River (Victoria)
- Calder River (Western Australia) in the Kimberley region

== United Kingdom ==
=== England ===
- River Calder, West Yorkshire, a major tributary of the River Aire
- River Calder, Cumbria, flows into the Irish Sea near Sellafield
- River Calder, Lancashire, a major tributary of the River Ribble
- River Calder, Wyre, Lancashire, a tributary of the River Wyre

=== Scotland ===
- River Calder, Highland, a tributary of the River Spey
- River Calder, Renfrewshire, near Lochwinnoch
- Tributaries of the River Clyde:
  - Rotten Calder, near East Kilbride
  - North Calder Water, from the Black Loch to Daldowie
  - South Calder Water, near Wishaw
  - Calder Water, near Strathaven, a tributary of the Avon Water
