= Robert Calder =

Royal Navy officer (1745–1818)

Admiral Sir Robert Calder Bt KCB
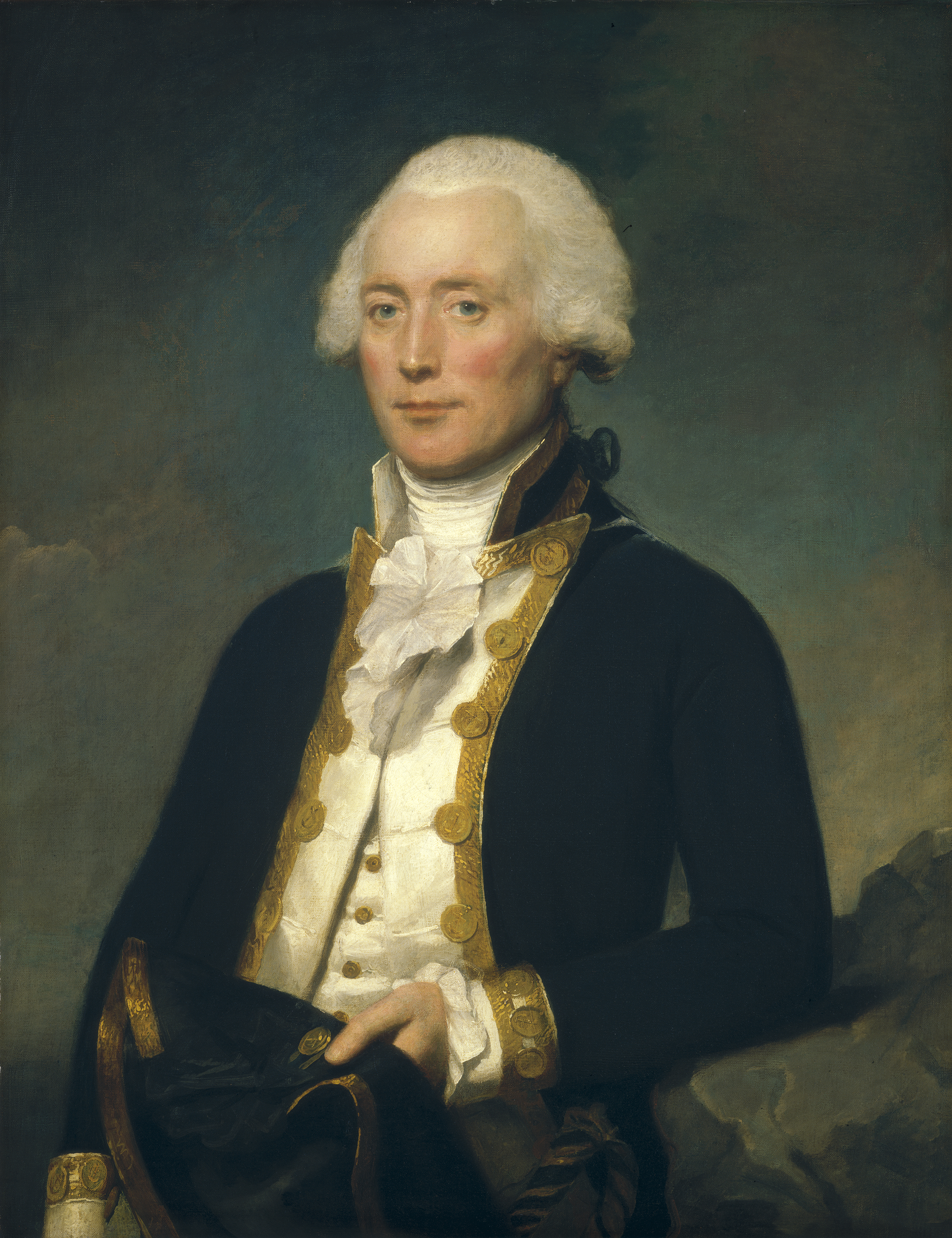
- Portrait by Lemuel Francis Abbott, c. 1787–1790
- Born: 2 July 1745; Elgin, Moray
- Died: 31 August 1818 (aged 73); Holt, near Bishop's Waltham, Hampshire
- Burial place: Church of the Blessed Mary, Upham
- Military career
- Allegiance: Great Britain; United Kingdom
- Branch: Royal Navy
- Service years: 1756–1818
- Rank: Admiral of the White
- Commands: HMS Magdalen; HMS Lightning; HMS Buffalo; HMS Diana; HMS Thalia; HMS Barfleur; HMS Stately; HMS Duke; HMS Theseus; HMS Ville de Paris; Plymouth Command
- Conflicts: Seven Years' War; Louisbourg Expedition (1757); Capture of Gorée; Invasion of Martinique (1762); American Revolutionary War; Battle of Ushant (1778); French Revolutionary Wars; Battle of Cape St. Vincent (1797); Napoleonic Wars; War of the Third Coalition; Battle of Cape Finisterre (1805)

Admiral of the White Sir Robert Calder, 1st Baronet, KCB (2 July 1745 – 31 August 1818) was a Royal Navy officer who served in the Seven Years' War, the American Revolutionary War, the French Revolutionary Wars and the Napoleonic Wars. For much of his career he was regarded as a dependable officer, and spent several years as Captain of the Fleet under Admiral Sir John Jervis. However, he is chiefly remembered for his controversial actions following the Battle of Cape Finisterre in 1805 which resulted in his court-martial. Though he was removed from his sea command, he was retained in the Navy and later served as Commander-in-Chief of the base at Plymouth.

== Early life ==
Robert Calder was born in Elgin, Scotland on 2 July 1745, second son to Sir James Calder and Alice Hughes, daughter of Rear-Admiral Robert Hughes. (Note: The 1911 edition of the Encyclopædia Britannica states that Calder was born in Elgin, Scotland but other sources, such as the Oxford Dictionary of National Biography and Nicholas Tracy's 2006 book, "Who's Who in Nelson's Navy", agree that his parents re-located to Kent, England and that he was born there.) His father was the 3rd Baronet Calder of Muirton, who had been appointed Gentleman Usher of the Privy chamber to the queen by Lord Bute in 1761. His elder brother, who succeeded to his father's baronetcy, was Major General Sir Henry Calder. Calder was educated in Maidstone, before joining the Royal Navy in December 1758 at the age of thirteen.

== Early career ==
Calder initially served aboard his cousin's ship, the 70-gun Nassau, in the American theatre of the Seven Years' War. En route to England, in September 1759, Nassau was dismasted in a storm and arrived at her destination with nine foot of water in her hold. As a midshipman, Calder received £1,800 in prize money for his part in the capture of the Spanish treasure ship Hermione on 21 May 1762 (an exceptionally large prize), and was subsequently promoted to lieutenant. At that rank, he served aboard HMS Essex, under Captain the Hon. George Faulkner, in the Caribbean. In 1780 he attained the rank of master and commander, later post-captain. He commanded the frigate HMS Diana of the Channel fleet at Spithead under Rear Admiral Richard Kempenfelt, and acquitted himself honourably in the various services to which he was called, but for a long time had no opportunity of distinguishing himself.

In 1794 he commanded the 74-gun ship HMS Theseus, which formed part of Lord Howe's fleet. He was appointed in 1796 Captain of the Fleet to Admiral John Jervis aboard HMS Victory, and saw action at the Battle of Cape St. Vincent on 14 February 1797. After the battle, he was selected by Jervis to carry the dispatches announcing the victory back to Britain, and was knighted by George III on 3 March 1797 for his services. He also received the thanks of Parliament, and was created 1st Baronet Calder of Southwick on 22 August 1798. Parliament voted to award him an annum of £1,200, which he declined. He continued in his service as Captain of the Fleet to Jervis, now Earl of St. Vincent, when the latter hoisted his flag in HMS Ville de Paris as Commander of the Mediterranean Fleet.

In 1799, he was promoted to rear-admiral; and in 1804, now a vice-admiral, was despatched with a small squadron in pursuit of a French force under Admiral Honoré Joseph Antoine Ganteaume, conveying supplies to the French army in Egypt. In this he was unsuccessful, and returning home at the peace he struck his flag. He had at this time become regarded as one of the Royal Navy's foremost experts on manoeuvring by signal-flag and in administering a large fleet. In 1801 he quarrelled with Admiral Sir John Duckworth over the payment of prize money. A court ruled in Calder's favour.

== Battle of Cape Finisterre ==
The Battle of Cape Finisterre, which ended Calder's active naval career

During the War of the Third Coalition, Calder was in command of the squadrons blockading the ports of Rochefort, France and Ferrol, Spain, in which (among others) ships were being prepared for Napoleon's planned invasion of the United Kingdom. Calder held his position with a force greatly inferior to that of the enemy, and refused to be enticed out to sea. On it becoming known that Napoleon intended to break the blockade of Ferrol as a prelude to his invasion, the British Admiralty ordered Rear-admiral Charles Stirling to join Calder and intercept the Franco-Spanish fleet on their passage to Brest, France. The approach of the enemy was concealed by fog.

Finally, on 22 July 1805, the fleets came into sight. The allies outnumbered the British, but Calder ordered his fleet into action. In the ensuing Battle of Cape Finisterre, fifteen British ships engaged twenty French and Spanish ships and captured two. The British losses were 39 officers and men killed and 159 wounded; the allies lost 158 dead and 320 wounded. After four hours, as night fell, Calder gave orders to discontinue the action. Over the following two days, the fleets remained close to one another, but did not re-engage. Calder focused on protecting his newly won prizes, while the French Vice-admiral Pierre-Charles Villeneuve declined to force another engagement.

Villeneuve left on 24 July, sailing to Ferrol, and eventually Cádiz, instead of resuming his course to Brest. Villeneuve had failed in all his objectives: he had landed no troops in Ireland, and the plan of linking with the fleet at Brest, driving off the British Channel squadrons, and supporting Napoleon's planned invasion came to nothing: the invasion army waited at Boulogne as before. In the judgment of Napoleon, his scheme of invasion was baffled by this day's action; but much indignation was felt in England at the failure of Calder to win a complete victory. However, Calder's superior, Admiral Sir William Cornwallis, Commander of the Channel Fleet, found no complaint with his performance: Calder was shortly thereafter given command of a 20-ship fleet to continue in the effort to bring the Franco-Spanish fleet to battle. These twenty ships would later form the nucleus of the British fleet at Trafalgar, when they were absorbed into the smaller squadron commanded by Vice-Admiral of the White Horatio Nelson.

== Court-martial and later career ==
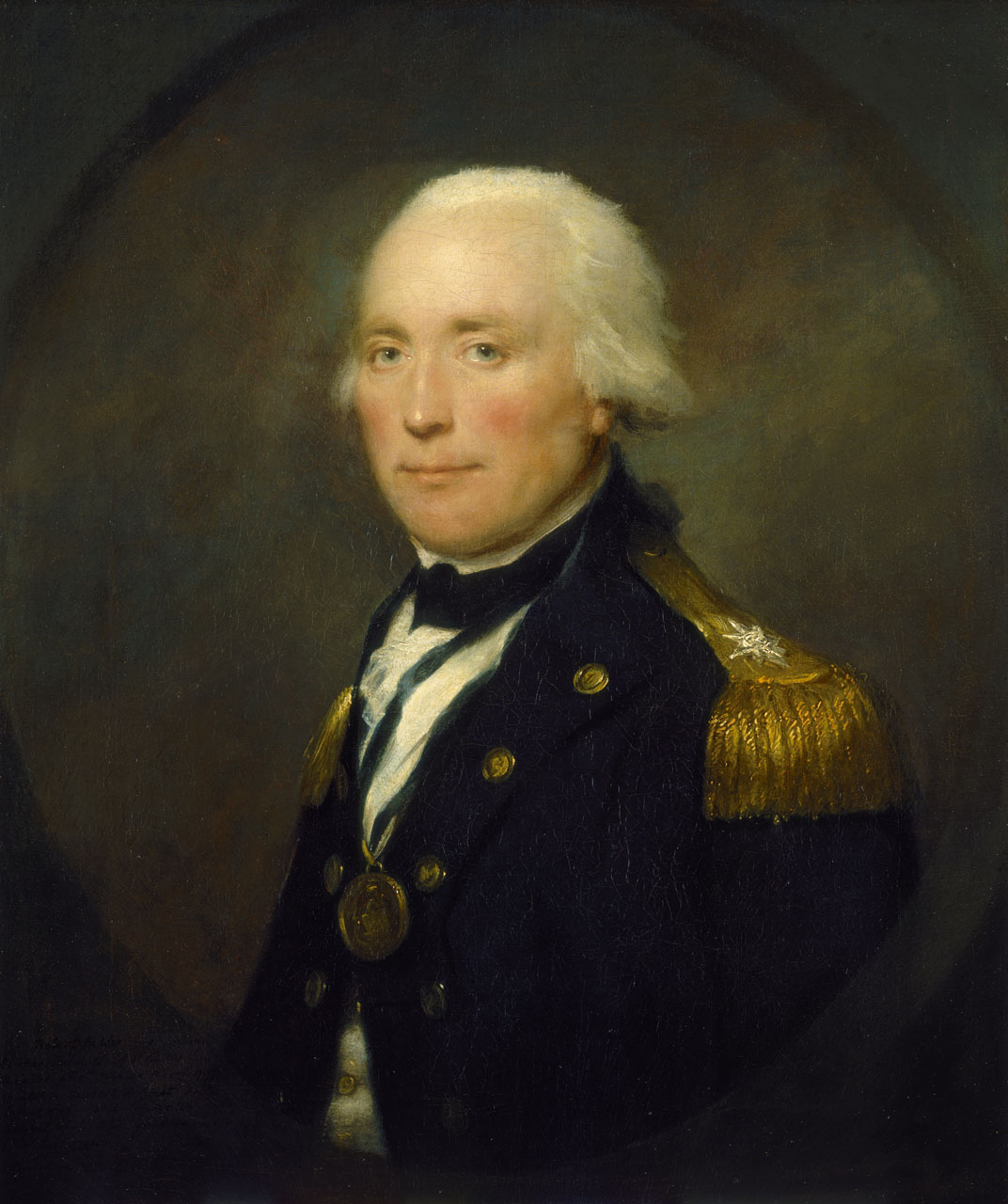
Portrait of Calder made after his promotion to Rear Admiral c. 1800

One of the primary reasons for the public outcry against Calder was the fact that his reports to Cornwallis were only partially printed for public consumption – making it thus seem as though Calder had not followed through on his own boasts. In consequence of the strong feeling against him, Calder demanded a court-martial. Nelson, who had now taken command of Calder's twenty ship fleet in addition to the force Nelson had brought back from the West Indies in his pursuit of Villeneuve, was ordered to send Calder home. Calder left in early October 1805, missing the Battle of Trafalgar. Nelson wrote privately: "I should have fought the enemy, and so did my friend Calder; but who can say that he will be more successful than another?" Nelson – to whom Calder had never been close – entreated him to remain until the battle had been fought, attesting that Calder had an opportunity to vindicate any earlier conduct and silence his critics. Calder could not be dissuaded, however, and sailed to England. At Calder's request (a fact which would later negatively affect opinion against him), Nelson allowed him to return in his own 98-gun ship, the Prince of Wales, even though battle was imminent.

The court-martial was held on 23 December 1805, being judged by, among others Admiral George Montague (serving as President of the court-martial) and future-Rear Admiral James Bisset. Calder's defence rested primarily on that the consequences of a defeat would have outweighed the fruits of a victory: despite his tactical success on 22 July, he was still outnumbered, and by concentrating his fleet to meet Villeneuve, he had of necessity been forced to abandon his blockade; thus if the French ships at Rochefort and Ferrol had sailed he would have found himself between two superior foes. This defence was undermined by the fact that Calder took no steps to verify the damage inflicted on Villeneuve's fleet and that contrary winds prevented the forces at Ferrol, Rochefort and Coruna from sailing (the latter a fact that Calder could not have been aware of at the time but certainly could have been when he made his defence some months later). Nelson wrote to the Second Naval Lord that, while he was sympathetic to Calder, "He appears to have had the ships at Ferrol more in his head than the ones in sight...he lays stress upon other considerations than fighting the enemy's squadron, if he could have done it, which he denies to be possible. I have ventured to recommend to Calder to keep to that; prove it, and his character is retrieved". Ultimately, Calder's defence rested on the discretion of a commander in battle, rather than in the physical impossibility of rejoining battle, contrary to Nelson's suggestions.

However, in the time between the battle at Finisterre and his court-martial, Trafalgar had been fought, Nelson had been killed and the threat of invasion by Napoleon forever ended. Therefore, as Calder later lamented, he had fought the battle under one set of standards and been tried against another. The nation had become "infected" and "drunk with success" from Nelson's victories. The battle, which might have won Calder an earldom in 1795, was deemed a failure in 1805 when judged against the stunning successes of the previous ten years, especially Trafalgar. The trial resulted in an acquittal on the charges of cowardice and disaffection. However, Calder received a severe reprimand for not having done his utmost to renew the engagement on 24 July, and never served at sea again.

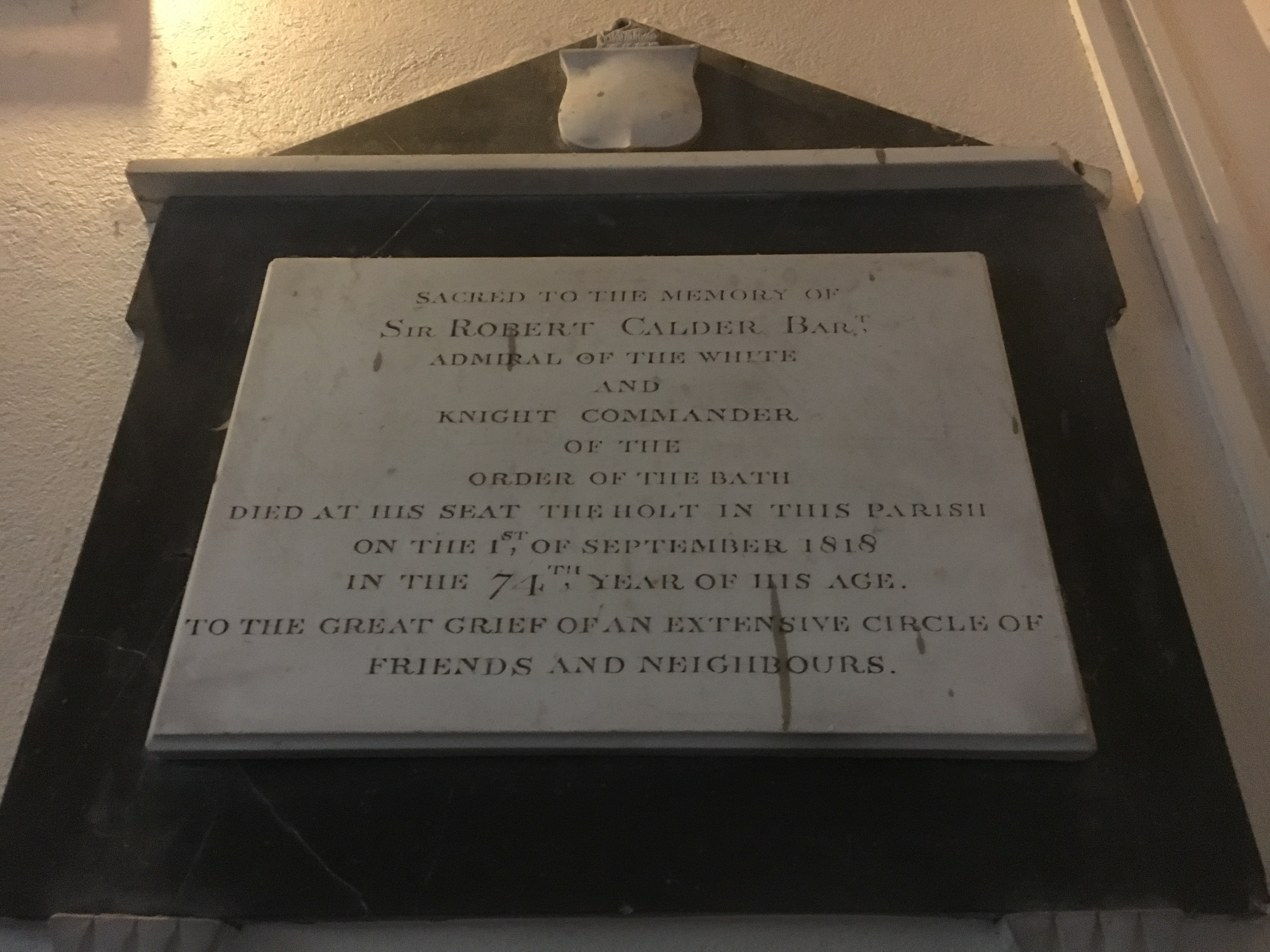
Marker for Calder near his grave site in Upham, Hampshire

However, he was not without his defenders. Both the Duke of Norfolk and the Earl of Romney spoke on his behalf in Parliament and, prior to his death in 1808, his brother-in-law, Admiral Robert Roddam wrote that were it not for Calder's action at Cape Finisterre, Nelson would not have had the opportunity to fight at Trafalgar. In time, there was a swing in public opinion back in favour of Calder, although not to the degree of the initial fury against him. Thus, when a change in government brought Charles Philip Yorke to the Admiralty, Calder's reputation was somewhat rehabilitated and he was appointed Commander-in-Chief, Plymouth in 1810. In the natural course of events, he was successively promoted due to seniority, eventually reaching Admiral of the Blue on 31 July 1810 and Admiral of the White on 12 April 1813. In the honors conferred on officers who fought in the Napoleonic Wars, he was created a Knight Commander, Order of the Bath on 2 January 1815. Nonetheless, his reputation never fully recovered from his court-martial. He died at Holt, near Bishop's Waltham, in Hampshire, in 1818.

A testament was written to him in the Gloucester Journal following his death:

"In ancient times, the Roman's eagle eye

Was fixed on CONDUCT, not on victory;

And Fabius' shield, its steady lustre pour'd

'Midst all the lightning of Marcellus' sword.

Unhappy CALDER! We, like birds of night;

And dazzled by an all-subduing light;

Though conquest crown'd, they temperate valour weigh'd

Each doubtful point – then Wisdom's voice obey'd

And thou, like Fabius, didst prepare the way

For Great Marcellus, and Trafalgar's day!

== Family ==
In May 1779 he married Amelia Mitchell only daughter of John Mitchell, esq., of Bayfield Hall, Norfolk. They had no children and his baronetcy accordingly became extinct upon his death.

== Arms ==
Coat of arms of Sir Robert Calder, Bt
Crest A swan in a lake, with bullrushes Proper. Escutcheon Or, a buck's head, caboshed, Sable, attired, Gules Supporters Dexter, a lamb murally crowned, in the mouth an olive branch, supporting the banner of Jerusalem; sinister, a tiger guard, navally crowned, in the mouth a palm branch, supporting the Union flag of Great Britain, with the inscription, 'Jerusalem, 1799' upon the cross of St. George.

== Notes ==
Military offices
Preceded by Sir William Young	Commander-in-Chief, Plymouth; 1810–1813	Succeeded by Sir William Domett
Baronetage of Great Britain
New creation	Baronet (of Southwick); 1798–1818	Extinct
Preceded by Callander baronets	Calder baronets of Southwick; 22 August 1798	Succeeded by Fletcher baronets
