= Henry Marsh (naval officer) =

English officer

Henry Marsh (died 10 June 1772, Greenwich) was an English officer who served in the Royal Navy from 20 January 1740 until his death on 10 June 1772.

He led the naval expedition during the British capture of Senegal in 1758.
