= Calder baronets =

Set index for Calder baronets

There have been two baronetcies created for the surname Calder. Both are extinct.

- Calder baronets of Muirton (1686)
- Calder baronets of Southwick (1798): see Sir Robert Calder, 1st Baronet (1745–1818)
