= William Bligh =

Royal Navy officer and colonial administrator (1754–1817)

Vice-Admiral of the Blue William Bligh FRS
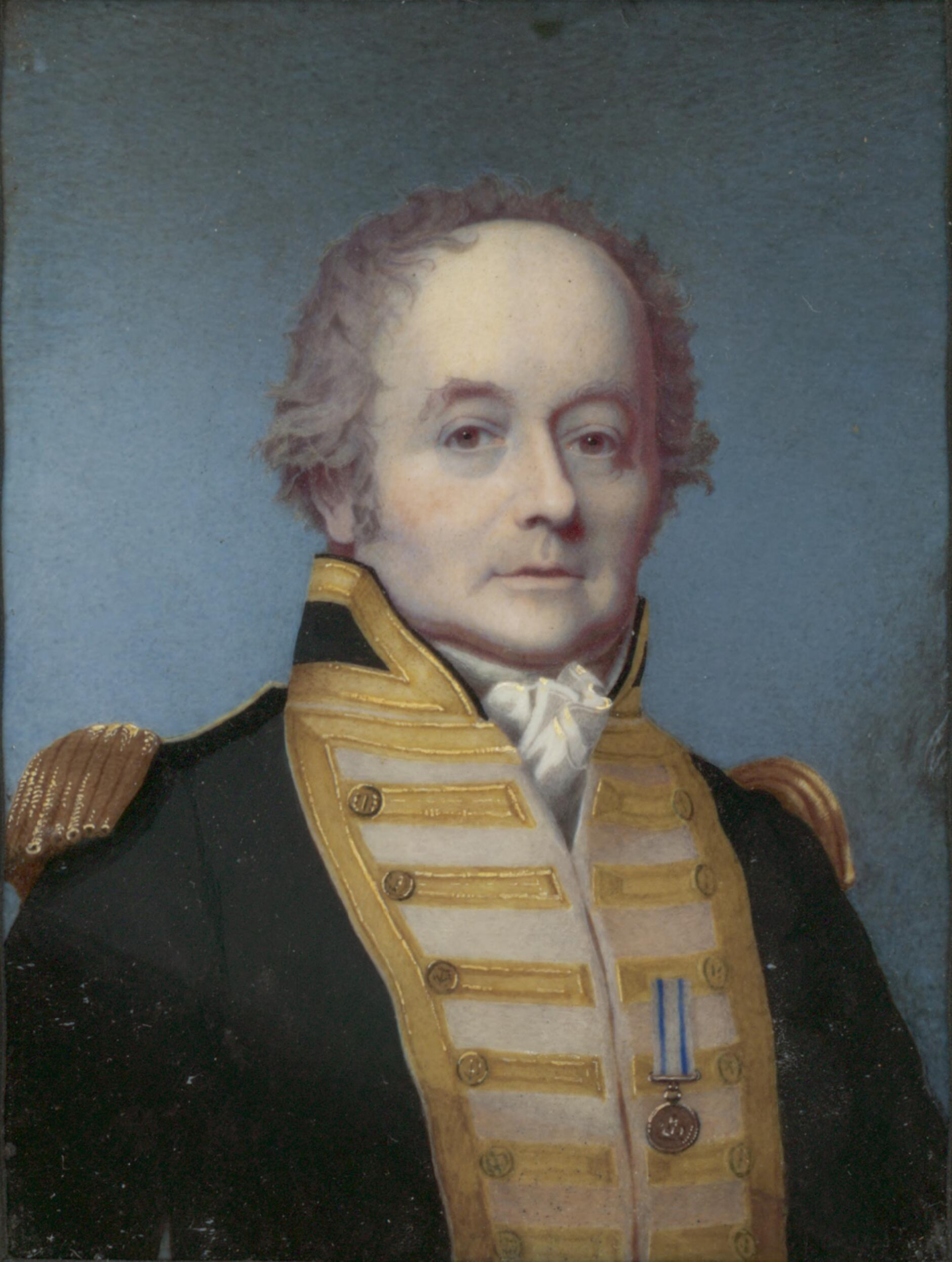
- Portrait by Alexander Huey, 1814

4th Governor of New South Wales
- In office 13 August 1806 – 26 January 1808
- Monarch: George III
- Lieutenant: William Paterson
- Preceded by: Philip Gidley King
- Succeeded by: Lachlan Macquarie

Personal details
- Born: 9 September 1754 Plymouth, Devon (or St Tudy, Cornwall), England
- Died: 7 December 1817 (aged 63) London, England
- Resting place: St Mary-at-Lambeth, Lambeth, London, England
- Spouse: Elizabeth Betham (m. 1781; died 1812)
- Children: 8, including Mary Putland
- Occupation: Naval officer, colonial administrator
- Known for: Mutiny on the Bounty
- Awards: Naval Gold Medal

Military service
- Allegiance: Great Britain; United Kingdom
- Branch/service: Royal Navy
- Years of service: 1761–1783 (Note: In 1783, Bligh left the Royal Navy to join the Merchant Service. He returned to the Royal Navy in 1787.); 1787–1817
- Rank: Vice-Admiral of the Blue
- Battles/wars: American War of Independence; Great Siege of Gibraltar; Fourth Anglo-Dutch War; Battle of Dogger Bank (1781); War of the First Coalition; Battle of Camperdown; War of the Second Coalition; Battle of Copenhagen (1801); Australian frontier wars; Hawkesbury and Nepean Wars

Vice-Admiral of the Blue William Bligh (9 September 1754 – 7 December 1817) was a Royal Navy officer and colonial administrator who served as the governor of New South Wales from 1806 to 1808. He is best known for his role in the mutiny on HMS Bounty, which occurred in 1789 while the ship was under his command. After being set adrift mid-ocean in Bounty's launch by the mutineers, Bligh and those loyal to him sailed to the Dutch East Indies. En route they stopped for supplies on the Fijian island of Tofua, losing one man to native attack. Bligh and his men reached Kupang in Timor after a journey of 3,618 nautical miles (6,700 km; 4,160 mi).

On 13 August 1806, Bligh was appointed governor of the British colony of New South Wales, with orders to clean up the corrupt rum trade of the New South Wales Corps. His actions directed against the trade resulted in the so-called Rum Rebellion, during which Bligh was placed under arrest on 26 January 1808 by the New South Wales Corps and deposed from his command, an act which the Foreign Office later declared to be illegal. He died in London on 7 December 1817.

== Early life ==
Bligh was born on 9 September 1754, but it is not clear where. It is likely that he was born in Plymouth, Devon, as he was baptised at St Andrew's Church on Royal Parade in Plymouth on 4 October 1754, where Bligh's father, Francis, was serving as a customs officer. Bligh's ancestral home of Tinten Manor in St Tudy, near Bodmin, Cornwall, is also a possibility. Bligh's mother, Jane Pearce (née Balsam), was a widow who married Francis at the age of 40.

Bligh was signed for the Royal Navy at age seven, at a time when it was common to sign on a "young gentleman" simply to gain, or at least record, the experience at sea required for a commission. In September 1771, Bligh was transferred to HMS Crescent and remained on the ship for three years.

c. 1776 portrait of Bligh attributed to John Webber

In 1776, Bligh was selected by Captain James Cook, for the position of sailing master of Resolution and accompanied Cook in July 1776 on Cook's third voyage to the Pacific Ocean, during which Cook was killed and was succeeded by Captain Charles Clerke, who was dying from tuberculosis. Due to his weakened state, Clerke placed Bligh in charge as navigator of the expedition and attempted to explore the Northwest Passage for a second time. Following Cook's and Clerke's deaths, Bligh played a significant role in navigating the beleaguered expedition back to England in August 1780. He was also able to supply details of Cook's last voyage following the return.

Bligh married Elizabeth Betham, daughter of a customs collector (stationed in Douglas, Isle of Man), on 4 February 1781. The wedding took place at nearby Onchan. The couple had eight children together: six daughters and twin sons (the boys died in infancy). The couple remained married until Elizabeth's death on 15 April 1812. A few days after the wedding, Bligh was appointed to serve on HMS Belle Poule as master (senior warrant officer responsible for navigation). Soon after this, in August 1781, he fought in the Battle of Dogger Bank under Admiral Parker, which won him his commission as a lieutenant. For the next 18 months, he was a lieutenant on various ships. He also fought with Lord Howe at Gibraltar in 1782.

Between 1783 and 1787, Bligh was a captain in the Merchant Service. Like many lieutenants, he would have found full-pay employment in the Navy; however, commissions were hard to obtain with the fleet largely demobilised at the end of the War with France, during which that country was allied with the North American rebelling colonies in the War of American Independence (1775–1783). In 1787, Bligh was selected as commander of His Majesty's Armed Transport Bounty. He rose eventually to the rank of vice admiral in the Royal Navy.

== Naval career ==
William Bligh's naval career involved various appointments and assignments. He first rose to prominence as Master of Resolution, under the command of Captain James Cook. Bligh received praise from Cook during what would be the latter's final voyage. Bligh served on three of the same ships on which Fletcher Christian also served simultaneously in his naval career.

Date	Rank	Ship (number of guns)
1 July 1761 – 21 February 1763	Ship's boy and captain's servant	HMS Monmouth (64)
27 July 1770	Able seaman	HMS Hunter (10)
5 February 1771	Midshipman	HMS Hunter (10)
22 September 1771	Midshipman	HMS Crescent (28)
2 September 1774	Able seaman	HMS Ranger
30 September 1775	Master's mate	HMS Ranger
20 March 1776 – October 1780	Master	HMS Resolution (12)
14 February 1781	Master	HMS Belle Poule
5 October 1781	Lieutenant	HMS Berwick (74)
1 January 1782	Lieutenant	HMS Princess Amelia (80)
20 March 1782	Sixth lieutenant	HMS Cambridge (80)
14 January 1783	Joins merchant service	
1785	Commanding lieutenant	Merchant vessel Lynx
1786	Captain	Merchant vessel Britannia
1787	Returns to Royal Navy	
16 August 1787	Commanding lieutenant	HM Armed Vessel Bounty
14 November 1790	Commander	HM Brig-sloop Falcon (14)
15 December 1790	Captain	HMS Medea (28) (for rank only)
16 April 1791 – 1793	Captain	HMS Providence (28)
16 April 1795	Captain	HMS Calcutta (24)
7 January 1796	Captain	HMS Director (64)
18 March 1801	Captain	HMS Glatton (56)
12 April 1801	Captain	HMS Monarch (74)
8 May 1801 – 28 May 1802	Captain	HMS Irresistible (74)
March 1802 – May 1803	Peace of Amiens	
2 May 1804	Captain	HMS Warrior (74)
14 May 1805	Appointed Governor of New South Wales	
27 September 1805	Captain	HMS Porpoise (12), voyage to New South Wales
13 August 1806 – 26 January 1808	Governor of New South Wales	
31 July 1808	Commodore	HMS Porpoise, Tasmania
3 April 1810 – 25 October 1810	Commodore	HMS Hindostan (50), returning to England.
31 July 1811	Appointed Rear-Admiral of the Blue (backdated to 31 July 1810)	
12 August 1812	Appointed Rear-Admiral of the White	
4 December 1813	Appointed Rear-Admiral of the Red	
4 June 1814	Appointed Vice-Admiral of the Blue	

In the early 1780s, while in the merchant service, Bligh became acquainted with a young man named Fletcher Christian (1764–1793), who was eager to learn navigation from him. Bligh took Christian under his wing, and the two became friends.

== Voyage of Bounty ==
The mutiny on the Royal Navy vessel HMAV Bounty occurred in the South Pacific Ocean on 28 April 1789. Led by Master's Mate / Acting Lieutenant Fletcher Christian, disaffected crewmen seized control of the ship, and set the then Lieutenant Bligh, who was the ship's captain, and 18 loyalists adrift in the ship's open launch. The mutineers variously settled on Tahiti or on Pitcairn Island. Meanwhile, Bligh completed a voyage of more than 3,500 nautical miles (6,500 kilometres; 4,000 miles) to the west in the launch to reach safety north of Australia in the Dutch East Indies (modern Indonesia) and began the process of bringing the mutineers to justice.

=== First breadfruit voyage ===
In 1787, Lieutenant Bligh, as he then was, took command of HMAV Bounty. In order to win a premium offered by the Royal Society, he first sailed to Tahiti to obtain breadfruit trees, then set course east across the South Pacific for South America and the Cape Horn and eventually to the Caribbean Sea, where breadfruit was wanted for experiments to see whether it would be a successful food crop for enslaved Africans on British colonial plantations in the West Indies islands. According to one modern researcher, the notion that breadfruit had to be collected from Tahiti was intentionally misleading. Tahiti was merely one of many places where the esteemed seedless breadfruit could be found. The real reason for choosing Tahiti has its roots in the territorial contention that existed then between France and Great Britain at the time. Bounty never reached the Caribbean, as mutiny broke out on board shortly after the ship left Tahiti.

The voyage to Tahiti was difficult. After trying unsuccessfully for a month to go west by rounding South America and Cape Horn, Bounty was finally defeated by the notoriously stormy weather and opposite winds and forced to take the longer way to the east around the southern tip of Africa (Cape of Good Hope and Cape Agulhas). That delay caused a further delay in Tahiti, as Bligh had to wait five months for the breadfruit plants to mature sufficiently to be potted in soil and transported. Bounty departed Tahiti heading west in April 1789.

=== Mutiny ===
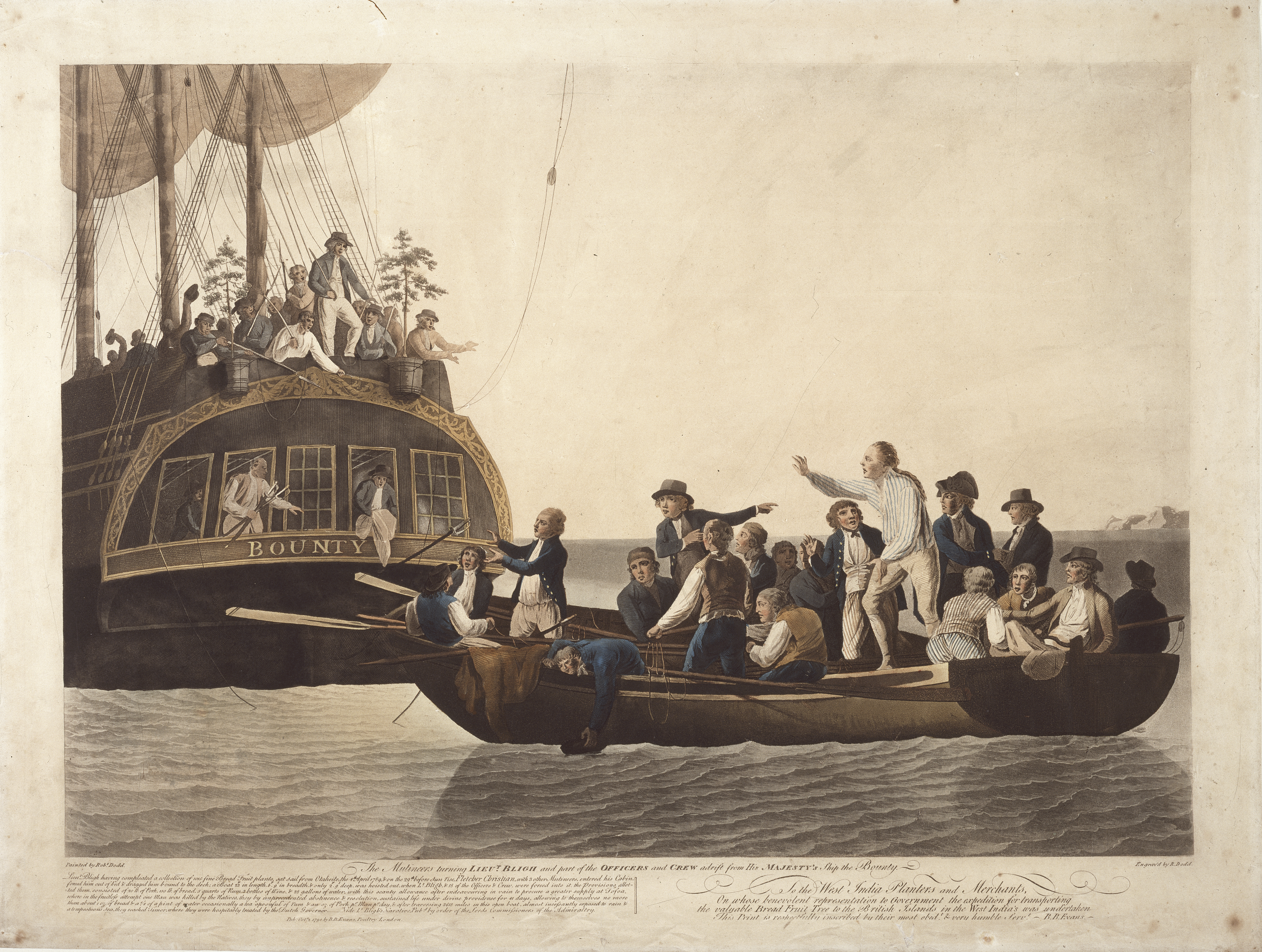
The mutineers turning Lt Bligh and some of the officers and crew adrift from His Majesty's Ship HMS Bounty. By Robert Dodd

Because the vessel was rated only as a cutter, Bounty had no commissioned officers other than Bligh (who was then only a lieutenant), a very small crew, and no Royal Marines to provide protection from hostile natives during stops or to enforce security on board ship. To allow longer uninterrupted sleep, Bligh divided his crew into three watches instead of two, placing his protégé Fletcher Christian—rated as a Master's Mate—in charge of one of the watches. The mutiny, which took place on 28 April 1789 during the return voyage, was led by Christian and supported by eighteen of the crew. They had seized firearms during Christian's night watch and surprised and bound Bligh in his cabin.

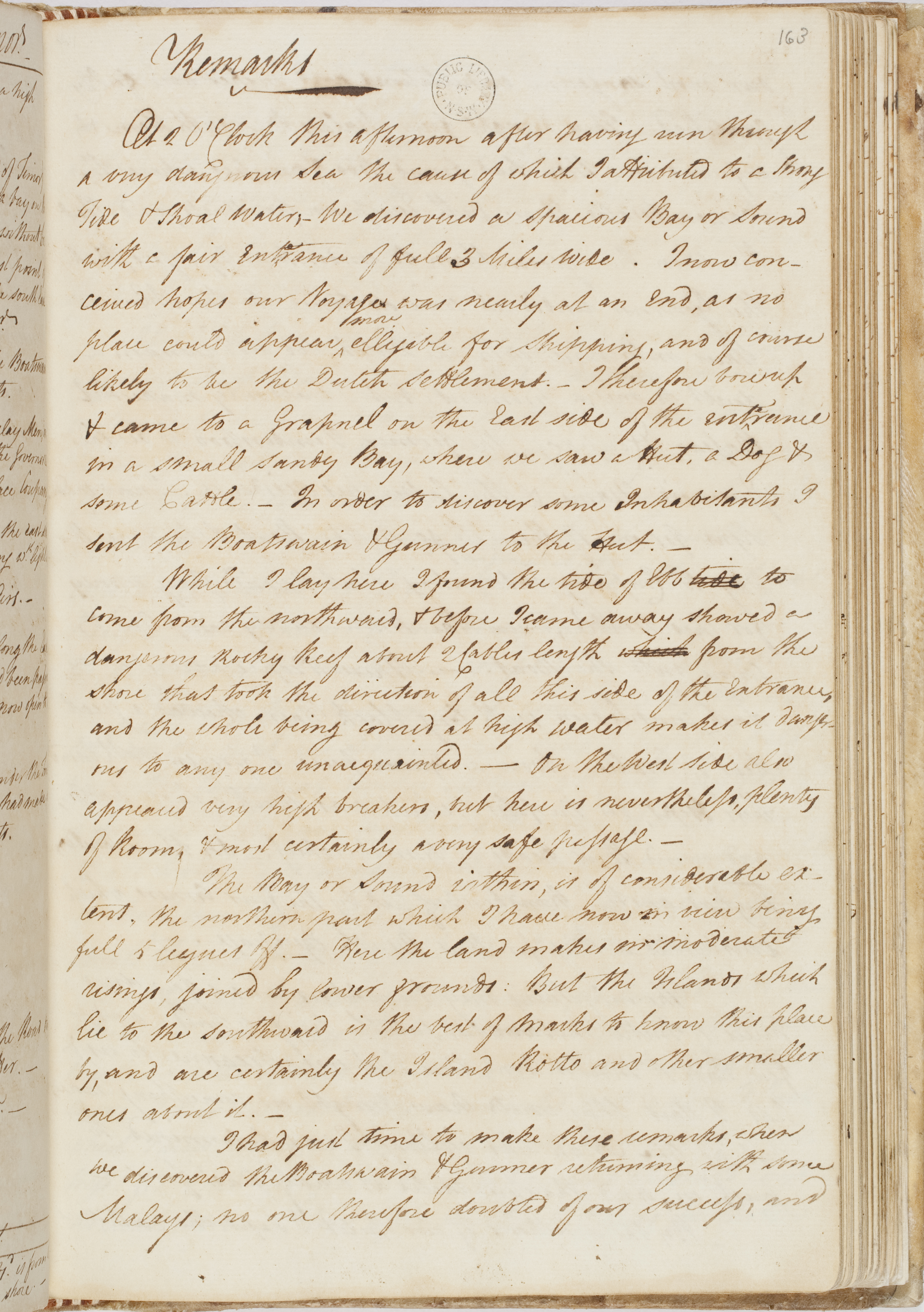
Account of arrival at Timor, 14 June 1789. Log of the Proceedings of His Majesty's Ship Bounty, 1789.

Despite being in the majority, none of the loyalists put up a significant struggle once they saw Bligh bound, and the ship was taken over without bloodshed. The mutineers provided Bligh and eighteen loyal crewmen a 23-foot (7 m) launch (so heavily loaded that the gunwales were only a few inches above the water). They were allowed four cutlasses, food and water for perhaps a week, a quadrant and a compass, but no charts, or marine chronometer. The gunner, William Peckover, brought his pocket watch, which was used to regulate time. Most of these instruments were obtained by the clerk, Mr Samuel, who acted with great calm and resolution, despite threats from the mutineers. The launch could not hold all the loyal crew members, so four were detained on Bounty for their useful skills; they were later released in Tahiti.

Tahiti was upwind from Bligh's initial position, and was the obvious destination of the mutineers. Many of the loyalists claimed to have heard the mutineers cry "Huzzah for Otaheite!" as Bounty pulled away. Timor was the nearest European colonial outpost in the Dutch East Indies (modern Indonesia), 3,618 nmi (6,701 km; 4,164 mi) away. Bligh and his crew first made for Tofua, only a few leagues distant, to obtain supplies. However, they were attacked by hostile natives and John Norton, a quartermaster, was killed. Fleeing from Tofua, Bligh did not dare to stop at the next islands to the west (the Fiji islands), as he had only a pair of cutlasses for defence and expected hostile receptions. He did however keep a log entitled "Log of the Proceedings of His Majesty's Ship Bounty Lieut. Wm Bligh Commander from Otaheite towards Jamaica" which he used to record events from 5 April 1789 to 13 March 1790. He also made use of a small notebook to sketch a rough map of his discoveries.

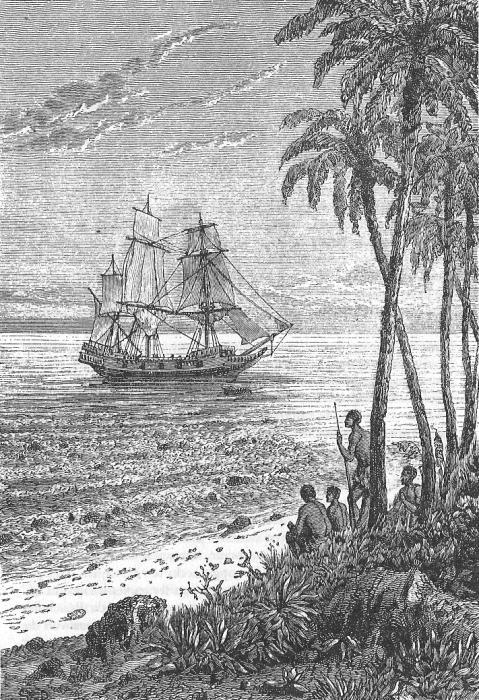
Original illustration by S. Drée from French author Jules Verne's story The Mutineers of the Bounty (Les Révoltés de la Bounty) (1879).

Bligh had confidence in his navigational skills, which he had perfected under the instruction of Captain James Cook. His first responsibility was to bring his men to safety. Thus, he undertook the seemingly impossible 3,618-nautical-mile (6,701 km; 4,164 mi) voyage to Timor, the nearest European settlement. Bligh succeeded in reaching Timor after a 47-day voyage, the only casualty being the crewman killed on Tofua. From 4 May until 29 May, when they reached the Great Barrier Reef north of Australia, the 18 men lived on 1/12 pound (40 grams) of bread per day. The weather was often stormy, and they were in constant fear of foundering due to the boat's heavily laden condition. On 29 May they landed on a small island off the coast of Australia, which they named Restoration Island, 29 May 1660 being the date of the restoration of the English monarchy after the English Civil War. Strains were showing within the party; following a heated disagreement with Purcell, Bligh grabbed a cutlass and challenged the carpenter to fight. Fryer told Cole to arrest their captain but backed down after Bligh threatened to kill him if he interfered. Fryer later said Bligh "was as tyrannical in his temper in the boat as in the ship." Over the next week or more they island-hopped north along the Great Barrier reef—while Bligh, cartographer as always, sketched maps of the coast. Early in June they passed through the Endeavour Strait and sailed again on the open sea until they reached Coupang, a settlement on Timor, on 14 June 1789. Despite the hardships he and his men had endured, upon reaching Kupang, Bligh maintained his stubborn adherence to Navy protocol, insisting that a makeshift Union Jack be made up and hoisted and that Fryer remain aboard the launch to guard her. Three of the men who survived this arduous voyage with him were so weak that they soon died of sickness, possibly malaria, in the pestilential Dutch East Indies port of Batavia, the present-day Indonesian capital of Jakarta, as they waited for transport to Britain. Two others died on the way to England.

=== Possible causes of the mutiny ===
The reasons behind the mutiny are still debated; some sources report that Bligh was a tyrant whose abuse of the crew led them to feel that they had no choice but to take over the ship. Other sources argue that Bligh was no worse (and in many cases gentler) than the average captain and naval officer of the era. They also argue that the crew—inexperienced and unused to the rigours of the sea—were corrupted by the freedom, idleness and sexual licence of their five months in Tahiti, finding themselves unwilling to return to the "Jack Tar's" life of an ordinary seaman. This view holds that most of the men supported Christian's prideful personal vendetta against Bligh out of a misguided hope that their new captain would return them to Tahiti to live their lives "hedonistically" and in peace, free from Bligh's acid tongue and strict discipline.

The mutiny is made more mysterious by the friendship of Christian and Bligh, which dates back to Bligh's days in the merchant service. Christian was well acquainted with the Bligh family. As Bligh was being set adrift, he appealed to this friendship, saying "you have dandled my children upon your knee". According to Bligh, Christian "appeared disturbed" and replied, "That,—Captain Bligh,—that is the thing;—I am in hell—I am in hell".

Bounty's log shows that Bligh was relatively sparing in his punishments. He scolded when other captains would have whipped, and whipped when other captains would have hanged. He was an educated man, deeply interested in science, convinced that good diet and sanitation were necessary for the welfare of his crew. He took a great interest in his crew's exercise, was very careful about the quality of their food and insisted upon the Bounty being kept very clean. The modern historian John Beaglehole has described the major flaw in this otherwise enlightened naval officer: "[Bligh made] dogmatic judgements which he felt himself entitled to make; he saw fools about him too easily … thin-skinned vanity was his curse through life … [Bligh] never learnt that you do not make friends of men by insulting them." Bligh was also capable of holding intense grudges against those he thought had betrayed him, such as Midshipman Peter Heywood and ship's gunner William Peckover; in regard to Heywood, Bligh was convinced that the young man was as guilty as Christian. Bligh's first detailed comments on the mutiny are in a letter to his wife Betsy, in which he names Heywood (a mere boy not yet 16) as "one of the ringleaders", adding: "I have now reason to curse the day I ever knew a Christian or a Heywood or indeed a Manks [sic] man." Bligh's later official account to the Admiralty lists Heywood with Christian, Edward Young and George Stewart as the mutiny's leaders, describing Heywood as a young man of abilities for whom he had felt a particular regard. To the Heywood family, Bligh wrote: "His baseness is beyond all description." Peckover applied for a position as gunner on HMS Providence (the second breadfruit expedition to Tahiti) but was refused by Bligh. In a letter to Sir Joseph Banks, dated 17 July 1791 (two weeks before departure), Bligh wrote:

Should Peckover my late Gunner ever trouble you to render him further services I shall esteem it a favour if you will tell him I informed you he was a vicious and worthless fellow—He applied to me to render him service & wanted to be appointed Gunner of the Providence but as I had determined never to suffer an officer who was with me in the Bounty to sail with again, it was for the cause I did not apply for him.

Bligh's refusal to appoint Peckover was partly due to Edward Christian's polemic testimony against Bligh in an effort to clear his brother's name. Christian states in his appendix:

In the evidence of Mr. Peckover and Mr. Fryer, it is proved that Mr. Nelson the botanist said, upon hearing the commencement of the mutiny, "We know whose fault this is, or who is to blame, Mr. Fryer, what have we brought upon ourselves?" In addition to this, it ought to be known that Mr. Nelson, in conversation afterwards with an officer (Peckover) at Timor, who was speaking of returning with Captain Bligh if he got another ship, observed, "I am surprized that you should think of going a second time with [Bligh] (using a term of abuse) who has been the cause of all our losses."

Popular fiction often confuses Bligh with Edward Edwards of HMS Pandora, who was sent on the Royal Navy's expedition to the South Pacific to find the mutineers and bring them to trial. Edwards is often made out to be the cruel man that Hollywood has portrayed. The 14 men from Bounty who were captured by Edwards's men were confined in a cramped 18′ × 11′ × 5′8″ wooden cell on Pandora's quarterdeck. Yet, when Pandora ran aground on the Great Barrier Reef, three prisoners were immediately let out of the prison cell to help at the pumps. Finally, Captain Edwards gave orders to release the other 11 prisoners, to which end Joseph Hodges, the armourer's mate, went into the cell to remove the prisoners' irons. Unfortunately, before he could finish the job, the ship sank. Four of the prisoners and 31 of the crew died during the sinking. More prisoners would likely have perished, had not William Moulter, a bosun's mate, unlocked their cages before jumping off the sinking vessel.

=== Aftermath ===
In October 1790, Bligh was honourably acquitted at the court-martial inquiring into the loss of Bounty. Shortly thereafter, he published A Narrative of the Mutiny on board His Majesty's Ship "Bounty"; And the Subsequent Voyage of Part of the Crew, In the Ship's Boat, from Tofoa, one of the Friendly Islands, to Timor, a Dutch Settlement in the East Indies. Of the 10 surviving prisoners eventually brought home in spite of Pandora's loss, four were acquitted, owing to Bligh's testimony that they were non-mutineers that Bligh was obliged to leave on Bounty because of lack of space in the launch. Two others were convicted because, while not participating in the mutiny, they were passive and did not resist. They subsequently received royal pardons. One was convicted but excused on a technicality. The remaining three were convicted and hanged.

Comparative travels of Bounty and the small boat after mutiny

Travel up to the mutiny (red)
1. Tasmania, Adventure Bay (21 August 1788)
2. first arrival at Tahiti (26 October 1788)
3. departure for the Caribbean (4 April 1789)
4. Palmerston
5. Tofua
6. 28 April 1789: mutiny

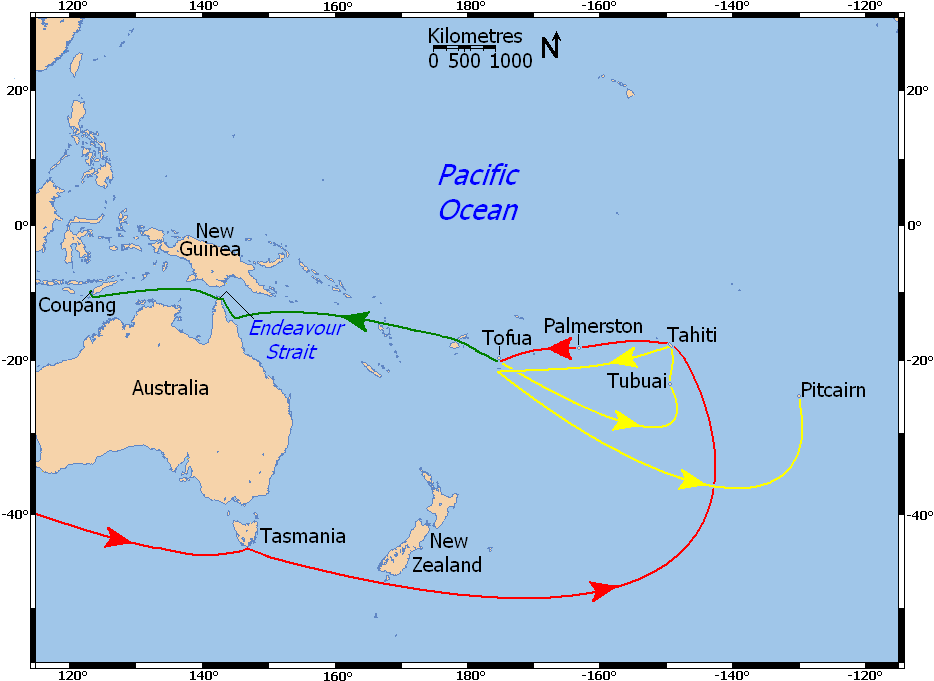

Travel of the mutineers (yellow)
7. Tubuai (6 July 1789)
8. second arrival at Tahiti
9. Tubuai (16 July 1789)
10. third arrival at Tahiti (22 September 1789)
11. departure from Tahiti (23 September 1789)
12. Tongatapu (15 November 1789)
13. 15 January 1790: Pitcairn, burning of the Bounty

Travel of Bligh's boat (green)
14. Bligh's party set adrift (29 April 1789)
15. Tonga
16. Timor (14 June 1789)

=== Bligh's letter to his wife, Betsy ===
The following is a letter to Bligh's wife, written from Coupang, Timor, Dutch East Indies (circa June 1791), in which the first reference to events on the Bounty is made.

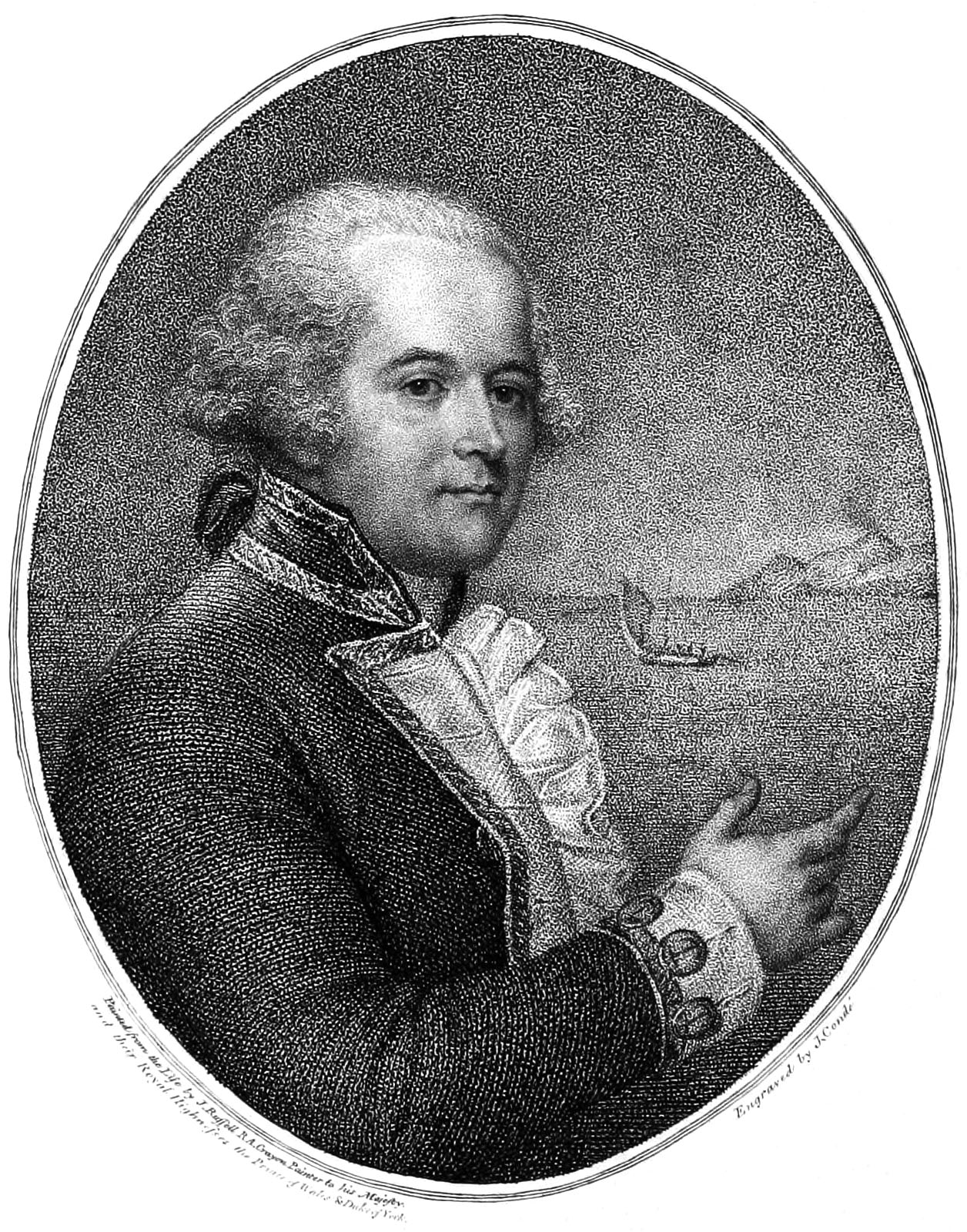
William Bligh, pictured in his 1792 account of the mutiny voyage, A Voyage to the South Sea

My Dear, Dear Betsy,

I am now, for the most part, in a part of the world I never expected, it is however a place that has afforded me relief and saved my life, and I have the happiness to assure you that I am now in perfect health....

Know then my own Dear Betsy, that I have lost the Bounty ... on the 28 April at day light in the morning Christian having the morning watch. He with several others came into my Cabin while I was a Sleep, and seizing me, holding naked Bayonets at my Breast, tied my Hands behind my back, and threatened instant destruction if I uttered a word. I however call'd loudly for assistance, but the conspiracy was so well laid that the Officers Cabbin Doors were guarded by Centinels, so Nelson, Peckover, Samuels or the Master could not come to me. I was now dragged on Deck in my Shirt & closely guarded—I demanded of Christian the case of such a violent act, & severely degraded for his Villainy but he could only answer—"not a word sir or you are Dead." I dared him to the act & endeavoured to rally some one to a sense of their duty but to no effect....

The Secrisy of this Mutiny is beyond all conception so that I can not discover that any who are with me had the least knowledge of it. It is unbeknown to me why I must beguile such force. Even Mr. Tom Ellison took such a liking to Otaheite [Tahiti] that he also turned Pirate, so that I have been run down by my own Dogs...

My misfortune I trust will be properly considered by all the World—It was a circumstance I could not foresee—I had not sufficient Officers & had they granted me Marines most likely the affair would never have happened—I had not a Spirited & brave fellow about me & the Mutineers treated them as such. My conduct has been free of blame, & I showed everyone that, tied as I was, I defied every Villain to hurt me...

I know how shocked you will be at this affair but I request of you My Dear Betsy to think nothing of it all is now past & we will again looked forward to future happyness. Nothing but true consciousness as an Officer that I have done well could support me....Give my blessings to my Dear Harriet, my Dear Mary, my Dear Betsy & to my Dear little stranger & tell them I shall soon be home...To You my Love I give all that an affectionate Husband can give –

Love, Respect & all that is or ever will be in the power of your
ever affectionate Friend and Husband Wm Bligh.

Strictly speaking, the crime of the mutineers (apart from the disciplinary crime of mutiny) was not piracy but barratry, the misappropriation by those entrusted with its care of a ship and its contents to the detriment of the owner (in this case the British Crown).

== Second breadfruit voyage ==
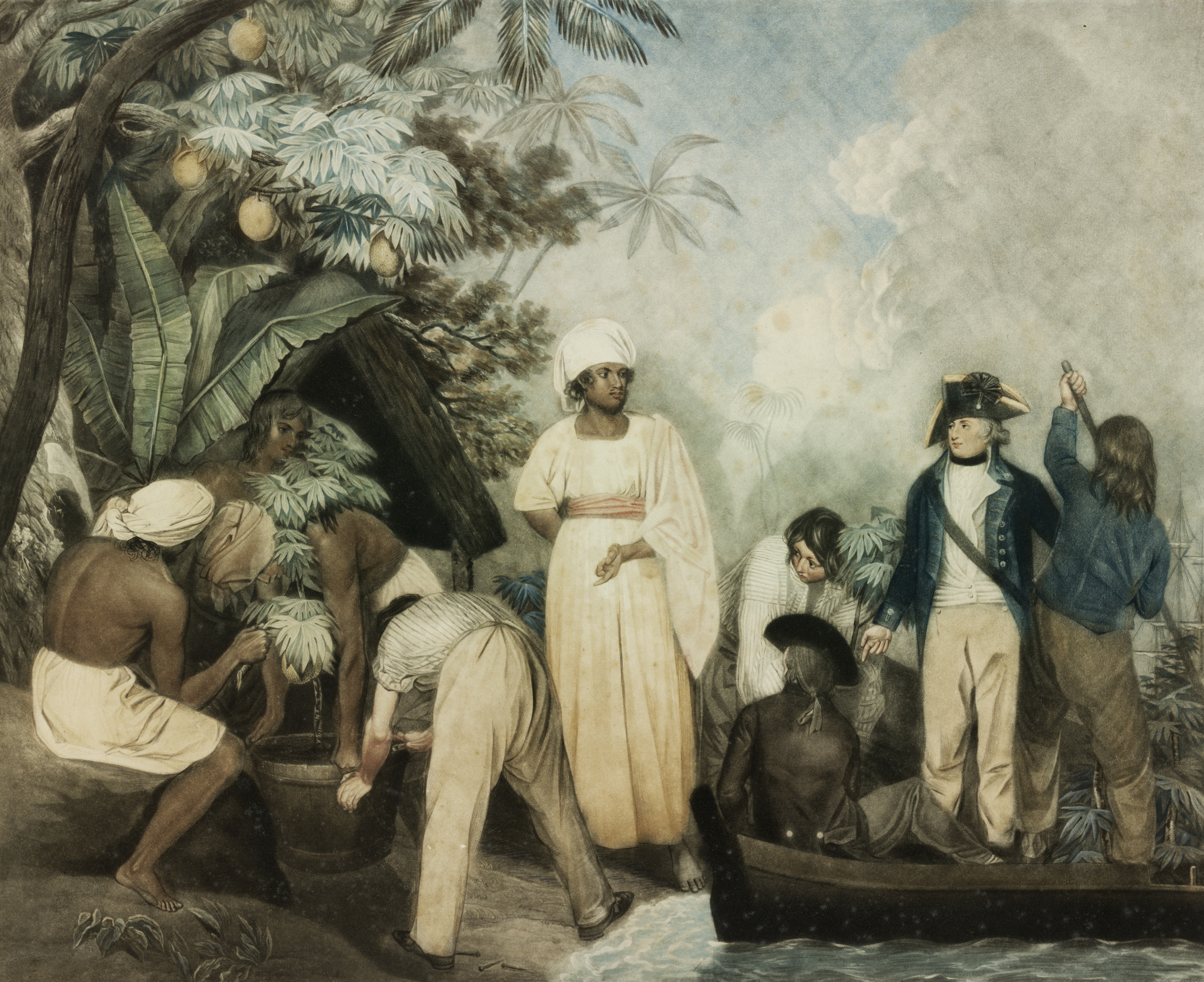
Transplanting breadfruit trees from Otaheite, 1796, Thomas Gosse

After his exoneration by the court-martial inquiry into the loss of Bounty, Bligh remained in the Royal Navy. From 1791 to 1793, as master and commander of HMS Providence and in company with HMS Assistant under the command of Nathaniel Portlock, he undertook again to transport breadfruit from Tahiti to the West Indies. He also transported plants provided by Hugh Ronalds, a nurseryman in Brentford. The operation was generally successful but its immediate objective, which was to provide a cheap and nutritious food for the African slaves in the West Indies islands around the Caribbean Sea was not met, as most slaves refused to eat the new food. During this voyage, Bligh also collected samples of the ackee fruit of Jamaica, introducing it to the Royal Society in Britain upon his return. The ackee's scientific name Blighia sapida in binomial nomenclature was given in honour of Bligh. In Adventure Bay, Tasmania, third lieutenant George Tobin made the first European drawing of an echidna.

== Later life ==
In February 1797, while Bligh was captain of HMS Director, he surveyed the Humber estuary, preparing a map of the stretch from Spurn to the west of Sunk Island. In April–May, Bligh was one of the captains whose crews mutinied over "issues of pay and involuntary service for common seamen" during the Spithead and Nore mutinies. The mutinies were not triggered by any specific actions by Bligh; the mutinies "were widespread, [and] involved a fair number of English ships". Whilst Director's role was relatively minor in this episode, she was the last to raise the white flag at its cessation. It was at this time that he learned "that his common nickname among men in the fleet was 'that Bounty bastard'."

As captain of Director at the Battle of Camperdown on 11 October, Bligh engaged three Batavian Navy vessels: Haarlem, Alkmaar and Vrijheid. While the Batavians suffered serious casualties, only seven seamen were wounded on Director. Director captured Vrijheid, the flagship of Batavian Vice-Admiral Jan Willem de Winter. For his actions during the battle, Bligh was awarded the Naval Gold Medal.

Bligh went on to serve under Admiral Nelson at the Battle of Copenhagen on 2 April 1801, in command of Glatton, a 56-gun ship of the line, which was experimentally fitted exclusively with carronades. After the battle, Nelson personally praised Bligh for his contribution to the victory. He sailed Glatton safely between the banks while three other vessels ran aground. When Nelson ignored Admiral Parker's signal "43" (stop the battle) and kept the signal "16" hoisted to continue the engagement, Bligh was the only captain in the squadron who could see that the two signals were in conflict. By choosing to fly Nelson's signal, he ensured that all the vessels behind him kept fighting.

Bligh was elected a Fellow of the Royal Society in May 1801 for distinguished services in navigation, botany, etc.

=== Governor of New South Wales ===
Bligh had gained a reputation as a firm disciplinarian. Accordingly, he was offered the position of Governor of New South Wales on the recommendation of Sir Joseph Banks (President of the Royal Society and a main sponsor of the breadfruit expeditions) and appointed in March 1805, at £2,000 per annum (equal to £149,265 today), twice the pay of the retiring governor, Philip Gidley King. He arrived in Sydney on 6 August 1806, to become the fourth governor. As his wife Elizabeth had been unwilling to undertake a long sea voyage, Bligh was accompanied by his daughter, Mary Putland, who would be the Lady of Government House; Mary's husband John Putland was appointed as William Bligh's aide-de-camp. During his time in Sydney, his confrontational administrative style provoked the wrath of influential settlers and officials. They included the wealthy landowner and businessman John Macarthur, and prominent Crown representatives such as the colony's principal surgeon, Thomas Jamison, as well as senior officers of the New South Wales Corps. Jamison and his military associates were defying government regulations by engaging in private trading ventures for profit, a practice that Bligh was determined to end.

The conflict between Bligh and the entrenched colonists culminated in another mutiny, the Rum Rebellion, when, on 26 January 1808, 400 soldiers of the New South Wales Corps under the command of Major George Johnston marched on Government House in Sydney to arrest Bligh. A petition written by John Macarthur and addressed to George Johnston was written on the day of the arrest but most of the 151 signatures were gathered in the days after Bligh's overthrow. A rebel government was subsequently installed and Bligh, now deposed, made for Hobart in Tasmania aboard HMS Porpoise. Bligh failed to gain support from the authorities in Hobart to retake control of New South Wales, and remained effectively imprisoned on the Porpoise from 1808 until January 1810.

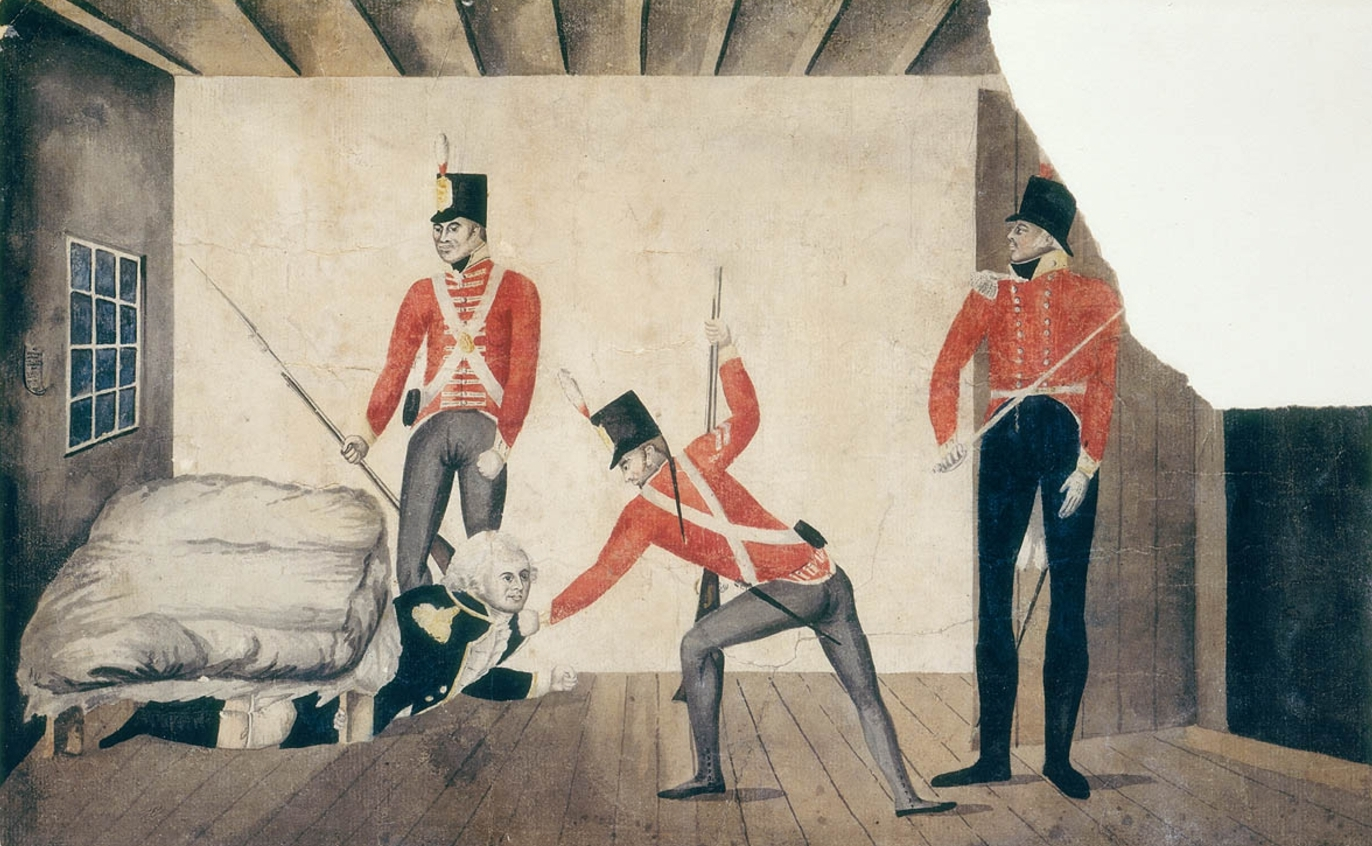
Propaganda cartoon of Bligh's arrest in Sydney in 1808, portraying him as a coward. State Library of New South Wales, Sydney

Shortly after Bligh's arrest, a watercolour illustrating the arrest by an unknown artist was exhibited in Sydney at perhaps Australia's first public art exhibition. The watercolour depicts a soldier dragging Bligh from underneath one of the servants' beds in Government House, with two other figures standing by. The two soldiers in the watercolour are most likely John Sutherland and Michael Marlborough and the other figure on the far right is believed to represent Lieutenant William Minchin. This cartoon is Australia's earliest surviving political cartoon and like all political cartoons it makes use of caricature and exaggeration to convey its message. The New South Wales Corps' officers regarded themselves as gentlemen, and in depicting Bligh as a coward, the cartoon declares that Bligh was not a gentleman and therefore not fit to govern.

Of interest, however, was Bligh's concern for the more recently arrived settlers in the colony, who did not have the wealth and influence of Macarthur and Jamison. From the tombstones in Ebenezer and Richmond cemeteries, (areas being settled west of Sydney during Bligh's tenure as governor), can be seen the number of boys born around 1807 to 1811 who received "William Bligh" as a given name, e.g. William Bligh Turnbull, ancestor of former Prime Minister of Australia, Malcolm Bligh Turnbull; and James Bligh Johnston, who designed Ebenezer Chapel, Australia's oldest extant church and oldest extant school.

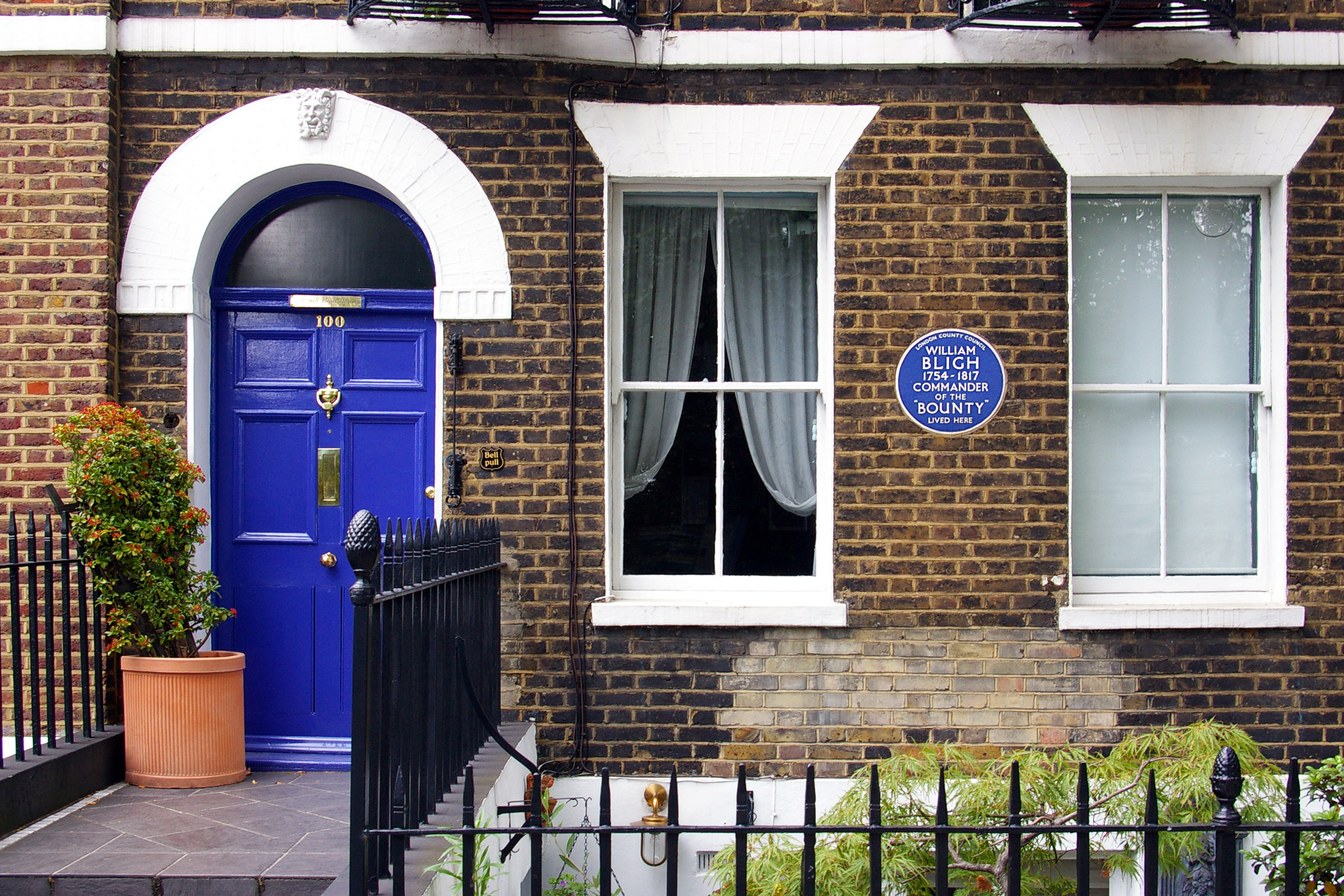
William Bligh House in London

=== Aftermath of the Rum Rebellion ===
Bligh received a letter in January 1810, advising him that the rebellion had been declared illegal, and that the British Foreign Office had declared it to be a mutiny. Lachlan Macquarie had been appointed to replace him as governor. At this news Bligh sailed from Hobart. He arrived in Sydney on 17 January 1810, only two weeks into Macquarie's tenure. There he would collect evidence for the coming court martial in England of Major Johnston. He departed to attend the trial on 12 May 1810, arriving on 25 October 1810. In the days immediately prior to their departure, his daughter, Mary Putland (widowed in 1808), was hastily married to the new Lieutenant-Governor, Maurice Charles O'Connell, and remained in Sydney. The following year, the trial's presiding officers sentenced Johnston to be cashiered, a form of disgraceful dismissal that entailed surrendering his commission in the Royal Marines without compensation. (This was a comparatively mild punishment that enabled Johnston to return a free man to New South Wales, where he could continue to enjoy the benefits of his accumulated private wealth.) Bligh was court martialled twice again during his career, being acquitted both times. Soon after Johnston's trial had concluded, Bligh received a backdated promotion to rear admiral. In 1814, he was promoted again to vice-admiral of the blue. Perhaps significantly, he never again received an important command, though with the Napoleonic Wars almost over there would have been few fleet commands available.

=== Final years and death ===
Bligh was recruited to chart and map Dublin Bay, and recommended the building walls for a refuge harbour at what was then known as Dunleary; the large harbour and naval base subsequently built there between 1816 and 1821 was called Kingstown, later renamed Dún Laoghaire. Many sources claim that Bligh designed the North Bull Wall at the mouth of the River Liffey in Dublin. He did propose the construction of a sea wall or barrier at the north of the bay in order to clear a sandbar by Venturi action, but his design was not used. The wall that was constructed used a design by George Halpin and resulted in the formation of North Bull Island by the sand cleared by the river's now more narrowly focused force.

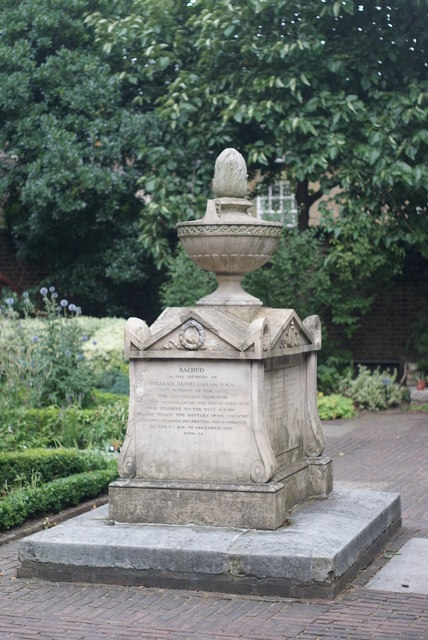
Bligh's tomb, surmounted by an eternal flame, sits in the graveyard at St Mary-at-Lambeth church.

Bligh died of cancer in Bond Street, London, on 7 December 1817 and was buried in a family plot at St. Mary's, Lambeth (this church is now the Garden Museum). His tomb was notable for its use of Coade stone (Lithodipyra), a compound of clay and other materials that was moulded in imitation of carved stonework and fired in a kiln. This stoneware was produced by Eleanor Coade at her factory in Lambeth. The tomb is topped by an eternal flame, not a breadfruit. A plaque marks Bligh's house, half a mile (700m) east of the Garden Museum at 100 Lambeth Road, opposite the Imperial War Museum.

He was related to Admiral Sir Richard Rodney Bligh and Captain George Miller Bligh, and his British and Australian descendants include Native Police Commandant John O'Connell Bligh and the former Premier of Queensland, Anna Bligh. He was also distantly related to the architect and psychical researcher Frederick Bligh Bond.

The New South Wales suburb of Bligh Park is named after William Bligh, as at the time of the Rum Rebellion, the Hawkesbury settlers supported the then-deposed governor.

== Legacy ==
Bligh's reputation has varied over time.

Bligh's logbooks documenting the mutiny were inscribed on the UNESCO Australian Memory of the World register on 26 February 2021.

He is the namesake of HMS Bligh, a Captain-class frigate of the Royal Navy during World War II.

=== Portrayals ===
Bligh has been the subject of numerous print and film portrayals.

=== Film ===
Bligh was portrayed by:

- George Cross (1916) The Mutiny of the Bounty
- Mayne Lynton (1933) In the Wake of the Bounty
- Charles Laughton (1935) Mutiny on the Bounty
- Bugs Bunny (1948) Buccaneer Bunny, in imitation of Laughton's 1935 portrayal
- Trevor Howard (1962) Mutiny on the Bounty
- Anthony Hopkins (1984) The Bounty

The 1935 and 1962 films largely perpetuate the image of Bligh as a tyrant while the 1984 film attempts a non-judgmental portrayal of Bligh.

=== Literature ===
Bligh is humorously portrayed in Sir Arthur Quiller-Couch's short story "Frenchman's Creek" as a competent but irascible and tactless surveyor sent to a small fishing village in Cornwall during the Napoleonic Wars. His accent and strong language being misunderstood by the locals as French, he is temporarily imprisoned as a spy.

Bligh features in Jules Verne's 1879 short story The Mutineers of the Bounty, as well as in the first two books of The Bounty Trilogy—Mutiny on the Bounty (1932) and Men Against the Sea (1934)—by Charles Nordhoff and James Norman Hall.

The situation in Sydney in 1810, with Bligh returning from Tasmania to be restored as governor, is the setting of Naomi Novik's fantasy novel Tongues of Serpents (Harper-Collins, 2011).

=== Television ===
On 17 December 1964, the "Adobe Dick" episode of the cartoon The Flintstones (episode 128) paid a humorous homage to Captain Bligh and his ship. On the show, the characters Fred and Barney took a chartered fishing trip with the guys from the lodge on the U.S.S. Bountystone. The captain of the ship, Captain Blah, was a domineering man with a uniform resembling the historical figure William Bligh.

Mutiny, on Channel 4 in the UK, charts a recreation of Bligh's journey to Timor. It aired in 2017.

== See also ==
- European and American voyages of scientific exploration
- Historical Records of Australia

== Bibliography ==
- Beaglehole, John (1974). The Life of Captain James Cook. Stanford, California: Stanford University Press.
- Bligh, William (1790). A Narrative of the Mutiny, on board His Majesty's ship Bounty. London: George Nicol.
- Gill, Conrad (1913). The Mutinies of 1797. Manchester University Press.
- Kennedy, Gavin (1978). Bligh. London: Duckworth. ISBN 0-7156-0957-2. OCLC 4359325.
- Kneale, Trevor (2007). The Isle of Man (Pevensey Island Guides). Newton Abbot, Devon: Brunel House. ISBN 978-1-898630-25-8.
- Mundle, Rob (2010). Bligh: Master Mariner. Sydney: Hachette Australia. ISBN 978-0-7336-2506-0.
- Rennison, Nick (2009). London Blue Plaque Guide (Fourth ed.). History Press. ISBN 9780752499963.
- Toohey, John (1999). Captain Bligh's Portable Nightmare. Fourth Estate. ISBN 1-84115-077-0.
- Toohey, John (March 2000). Captain Bligh's Portable Nightmare: From the Bounty to safety – 4,162 Miles Across the Pacific in a Rowing Boat. New York: HarperCollins. ISBN 0-06-019532-0.
- Yarwood, A. T. (1967). "Johnston, George (1764–1823)". Australian Dictionary of Biography. Vol. II. National Centre of Biography, Australian National University.

== Manuscript sources ==
- Log of the Proceedings of His Majestys Ship Bounty Lieut. Wm Bligh Commander from Otaheite towards Jamaica, signed `Wm Bligh', 5 Apr. 1789 – 13 Mar. 1790, Bligh family papers, principally those of Vice-Admiral William Bligh, were presented to the then Public Library of New South Wales on 29 October 1902 by Bligh's grandson William Russell Bligh. These papers were subsequently transferred from the Public Library to the Mitchell Library in June 1910, State Library of New South Wales, Safe 1/47.
- Greville, Charles Francis, Letter from William Bligh to Rt. Hon. Charles Francis Greville, 10 September 1808. 10 September 1808; Autograph letter, signed, written from Government House, Sydney (8 pages). Bligh relates the circumstances of his seizure by the New South Corps on 26 January 1808 and subsequent house arrest, blaming the events on the machinations of John Macarthur, State Library of New South Wales, Safe 1/49.
- Rev. Dr Vyse, papers concerning William Bligh, 1811, Proceedings of A General Court-Martial held at Chelsea Hospital ... for the Trial of Lieut.-Col. Geo. Johnston ..., London, Sherwood, Neely and Jones, 1811. Dr Vyse's bookplate is pasted on the inside of the front cover. Letter from William Bligh to Rev. Dr Vyse presenting him with the above book, 13 November 1811. The letter is unsigned but is sealed with Bligh's personal seal. State Library of New South Wales, MLMSS 7307.
- William Bligh, papers relating to Bligh estate, 1838–1840, 1844–1846, Legal documents that pertain to the administration and sale of the estate amassed by William Bligh in New South Wales that include Copenhagen, Camperdown, Mount Betham, Simpson's Farm, and Tyler's Farm, State Library of New South Wales, A 462.
- William Bligh, Letter from William Bligh to Sir Evan Nepean, 24 April 1791, Letter (with transcript) from William Bligh to Sir Evan Nepean referring to preparations for the second breadfruit voyage to Tahiti and the West Indies. State Library of New South Wales, Safe 1/241b
- William Bligh, Letter from William Bligh to Sir Joseph Banks, 26 November 1805, letter was written from the Lady Madeleleine Sinclair several months before she sailed for New South Wales, State Library of New South Wales, Safe 1/241c.
- William Bligh – Papers, 1769–1822, undated, A. HMS Bounty papers, 1787–1794, B. HMS Falcon, Commission, 1790, C. HMS Medea, Commission, 1790, D. HMS Providence and the tender HMS Assistant, papers, 1791–1793, undated, E. HMS Warley, Commission, 1795, F. HMS Calcutta, Commission, 1795, G. HMS Director, papers, 1796, 1797, undated, H. HMS Glatton, papers, 1801, I. HMS Irresistable, Commission, 1801, J. HMS Warrior, Commission, 1804, K. Captain and Governor-in-Chief of the Territory of New South Wales and its dependencies, papers, 1805–1811, undated, L. Naval and Other papers, 1769–1822, undated, State Library of New South Wales, series 414414.
- William Bligh, Pardon granted to Joseph Moreton by William Bligh, 29 October 1806, 1 folder of textual material – manuscript, State Library of New South Wales, Am 68
Digitised versions of Bligh's logbooks are available on the Library's website.

Government offices
Preceded by Philip Gidley King	Governor of New South Wales; 1806–1808	Succeeded by Lachlan Macquarie
