= Parker baronets of Melford Hall (1681) =

Escutcheon of the Parker baronets of Melford Hall

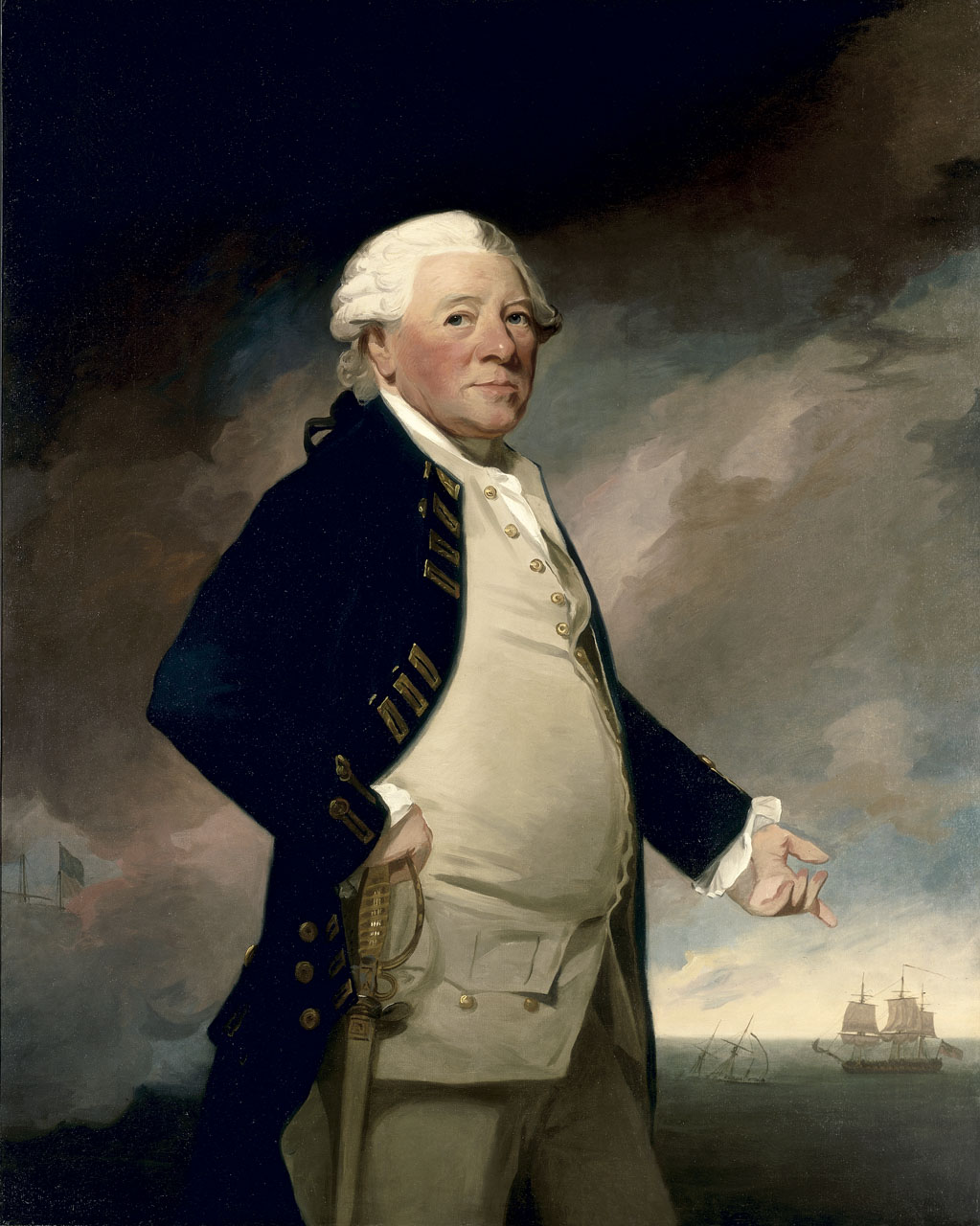
Admiral Sir Hyde Parker, 5th Baronet, of Melford Hall

The Parker baronetcy, of Melford Hall in the County of Suffolk, was created in the Baronetage of England on 1 July 1681 for Hugh Parker, a merchant and alderman of London.

On his death in 1697 the baronetcy descended by special remainder to his nephew, Henry Parker, then of Honington Hall near Stratford on Avon, Warwickshire, Member of Parliament for Evesham and Aylesbury. He married Margaret, daughter and heir of Alexander Hyde, Bishop of Salisbury, first cousin of Edward Hyde, 1st Earl of Clarendon. The 5th Baronet was the naval commander Sir Hyde Parker.

== Parker baronets, later Hyde-Parker Baronets, of Melford Hall (1681) ==
- Sir Hugh Parker, 1st Baronet (c.1607–1697)
- Sir Henry Parker, 2nd Baronet (1638–1713)
- Sir Henry John Parker, 3rd Baronet (c.1704–1771)
- Sir Henry Parker, 4th Baronet (c.1713–1782)
- Sir Hyde Parker, 5th Baronet (1714–1783)
- Sir Harry Parker, 6th Baronet (c.1735–1812)
- Sir William Parker, 7th Baronet (c.1770–1830)
- Sir Hyde Parker, 8th Baronet (1785–1856), Member of Parliament (MP) for the Western division of Suffolk 1832–1835
- Sir William Parker, 9th Baronet (1826–1891)
- Sir William Hyde Parker, 10th Baronet (1863–1931)
- Sir William Stephen Hyde-Parker, 11th Baronet (1892–1951)
- Sir Richard William Hyde-Parker, 12th Baronet (1937–2022)
- Sir William John Hyde-Parker, 13th Baronet (born 1983)

== Extended family ==
The second son of the 5th Baronet was Admiral Sir Hyde Parker. He was the father of the naval commander Admiral Hyde Parker and of John Boteler Parker, a major general in the British Army.
