= Parker baronets =

Set index for Parker baronets

There have been seven baronetcies created for persons with the surname Parker, three in the Baronetage of England, two in the Baronetage of Great Britain and two in the Baronetage of the United Kingdom. As of 2026 two of the creations are extant.

- Parker baronets of Arwaton (1661)
- Parker baronets of Ratton (1674)
- Parker baronets of Melford Hall (1681), later Hyde-Parker baronets
- Parker baronets of Bassingbourn (1783)
- Parker baronets of Harburn (1797)
- Parker baronets of Shenstone Lodge (1844)
- Parker baronets of Carlton House Terrace (1915): see Sir Horatio Gilbert George Parker, 1st Baronet (1862–1932)
