= HMS Cato (1782) =

Royal Navy fourth rate

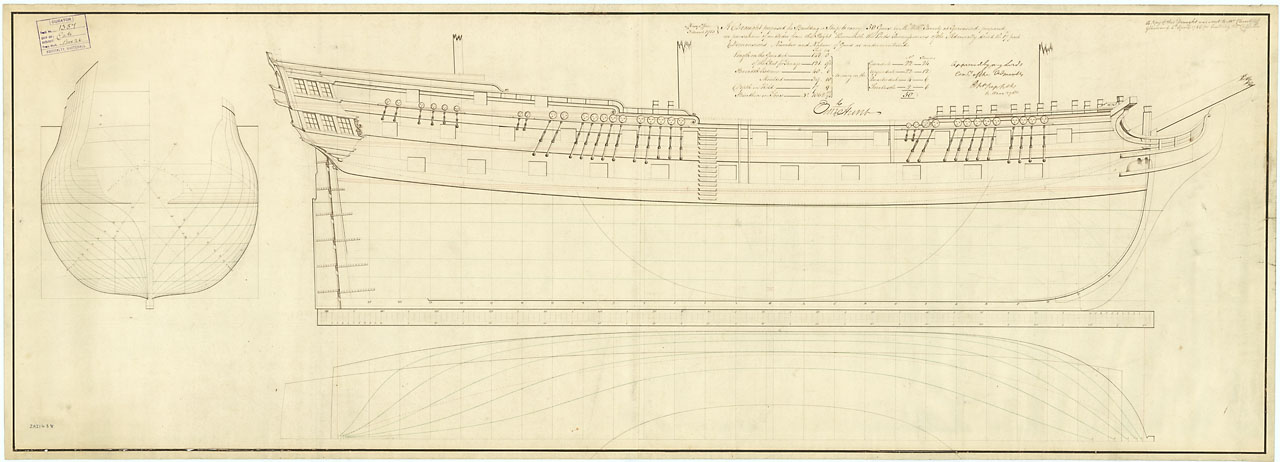
- Plan of Cato

History

Great Britain
- Name: HMS Cato
- Namesake: Cato the Elder
- Ordered: 17 February 1780
- Builder: William Cleverley, Gravesend
- Cost: £28,037
- Laid down: June 1780
- Launched: 29 May 1782
- Commissioned: May 1782
- Fate: Missing, presumed lost January 1783

General characteristics
- Class & type: Grampus-class fourth rate
- Tons burthen: 107133/94 (bm)
- Length: 147 ft 10 in (45.1 m) (overall); 121 ft 5 in (37 m) (keel)
- Beam: 40 ft 8 3/4 in (12.4 m)
- Depth of hold: 17 ft 9 in (5.4 m)
- Complement: 350
- Armament: Lower deck: 22 × 24-pounder guns; Upper deck: 22 × 12-pounder guns; Quarterdeck: 4 × 6-pounder guns; Forecastle: 2 × 6-pounder guns

HMS Cato was a 50-gun Grampus-class fourth rate ship of the Royal Navy. One of a class of ships constructed for service in the American Revolutionary War, Cato was commissioned in 1782. She became the flagship of Sir Hyde Parker, and sailed with him to the East Indies Station later in the year. After stopping at Rio de Janeiro on 12 December, the ship sailed for the Cape of Good Hope and was never seen again. Theories on her disappearance include her being shipwrecked in locations such as the Malabar Coast and the Maldives, and the crew being murdered by natives. Sir John Knox Laughton argues that it is more likely that Cato caught fire and blew up at sea.

== Design ==
In the American Revolutionary War the Royal Navy was in need of warships that were small enough to capably operate in the shallow waters around North America, but that were still large enough to provide effective firepower. The traditional two-decker ships of the line were too large to combat the smaller craft operated by the Continental Navy, while frigates were deemed too small and inappropriate to assist with expected amphibious operations. Instead the Royal Navy looked towards 44-gun fifth rates and 50-gun fourth rates, both of which were anomalous types of ships not large enough to join the line of battle but equally incapable of serving as a frigate would. These ships were however perfect for the war in America, and between 1775 and 1781 twenty-nine of them were ordered, of which ten were 50-gun fourth rates.

By 1780 the extant fourth rates in Royal Navy service were becoming worn, and several had been lost in the years of war. The Surveyor of the Navy Edward Hunt thus provided a new design to assist in replacing these. He produced the Grampus class, which was a version of Sir John Williams' proven Portland class with an extended gun deck. The class copied the Portland armament, with eleven lower deck gunports and twelve on the upper deck, but also incorporated some features from Williams' Experiment class, which had been an attempt to produce a lighter and faster fourth rate design. As such the Grampus ships were not to have the traditional roundhouse, with a set of false stern lights in place to infer otherwise. Other new features included a more substantial bow that connected the forecastle all the way to the sternpost; this feature subsequently became standard in all frigates but was only used in other fourth rates from the start of the nineteenth century.

== Construction ==
Named after Cato the Elder, a Roman soldier and statesman, Cato was the second of two ships built to the Grampus design. Contracted to William Cleverley at Gravesend, Cato was ordered on 17 February 1780, laid down in June 1780 and launched on 29 May 1782 with the following dimensions: 147 feet 10 inches (45.1 m) along the gun deck, 121 feet 5 inches (37 m) at the keel, with a beam of 40 feet 8 3/4 inches (12.4 m) and a depth in the hold of 17 feet 9 inches (5.4 m). She measured 1,071 33/94 tons burthen.

Despite what Hunt's design expected, Cato was given a full roundhouse and a true stern gallery during her construction. This was at odds with her sister ship HMS Grampus, which was built true to the design. The addition of the roundhouse suggests that Cato was planned for use as a flagship, thus requiring the extra space. However, this meant that the number of gunports on her quarterdeck were decreased from four a side to three. Cato also received built-up bulwarks on her quarterdeck rather than the planned open rail design.

Cato sailed from Gravesend to Woolwich Dockyard later in the month of her launch. By the time of her completion copper sheathing was becoming a standard inclusion on ships, and she was coppered between 1 June and 12 June. She received her fitting out at the same time, and was completed on 10 October. Her construction and fitting out cost a total of £28,037. With a crew complement of 350, Cato was armed with twenty-two 24-pounder long guns on her lower deck, with twenty-two 12-pounder guns on her upper deck. On her quarterdeck were four 6-pounders, and a further two were on the forecastle. A new establishment for carronades on 50-gun ships was created in July 1779, but it is not recorded whether Cato received these additions. (Note: The establishment was officially laid down as six 12-pounder carronades on top of the roundhouse, with two more at the forecastle and two 24-pounder carronades on the quarterdeck, however when the armament was added to other vessels it often differed drastically from this.)

== Service ==
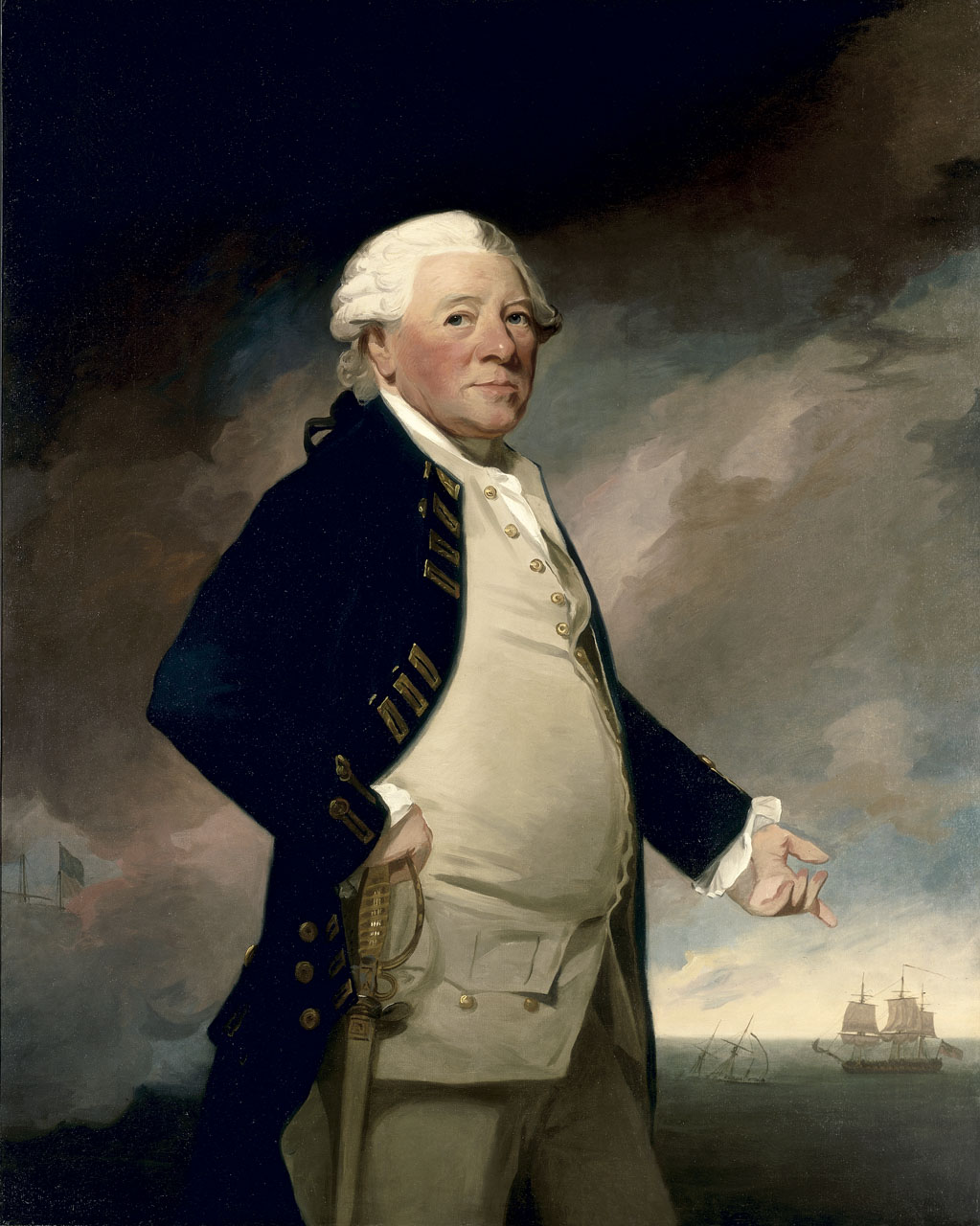
Vice-Admiral Sir Hyde Parker was on board Cato at the time of her disappearance

Captain James Clarke commissioned Cato in May 1782. The ship sailed on 13 October for the East Indies Station, (Note: Cato is described by John Charnock as a 58-gun ship at this time.) serving as the flagship of Vice-Admiral Sir Hyde Parker who was travelling to take up his position as commander-in-chief on the station. (Note: Reports at the time expected that Lieutenant-General Lord Cornwallis would also sail on Cato to take up post as Governor General of India, but this did not eventuate.) Cato was in company with the 14-gun sloop HMS Hound. They reached Madeira on 27 October and continued their journey on 1 November. (Note: Hound sailed on to Bombay and in April 1784 was reported to have arrived at the Cape of Good Hope from there. She arrived at Gravesend, Kent on 21 June 1784.)

=== Disappearance ===
Having reached South America, Cato left Rio de Janeiro on 12 December and soon disappeared. Stores identified as belonging to Cato were later seen on vessels trading in the Indian Ocean and Arabian Sea. Several suggestions have been put forward as to what happened to Cato and her crew. Having passed the Cape of Good Hope she likely reached the Indian Ocean. Subsequent theories on her fate have included her being shipwrecked off South Arabia, the Malabar Coast, Madagascar, or the Maldives, in around January 1783.

=== Possible accounts ===
After Cato's disappearance a wreck was discovered near King's Island in the Maldives, and it was inspected by the East India Company in 1786 with the assumption that it was Cato. In 1805 a report was received from the captain of the country ship Fancy that described how the crew of the ship had been rescued, but after one attempted to rape a native girl, the entire crew had been tied together in pairs and thrown into a hole which was then filled in by the native population.

In 1791 the English captain of a vessel belonging to Muhammad Ali Khan Wallajah, the Nawab of Arcot, reported that he had seen stores, including the mainsail, from Cato on a Malay boat at Mecca. The Malay on the boat stated that a large ship had wrecked some years earlier on the Malabar Coast. They believed that most of those aboard her had gotten safely ashore but that the Malay king there had most of them put to death immediately. Theories continued to be proposed after this; on 1 November 1805 the East Indiaman Britannia and transport ship King George were wrecked on Rocas Atoll. While there they noted another shipwreck on the beach, and from its age they suggested that it was the wreck of Cato, however the location did not match Cato's route.

Naval historian Sir John Knox Laughton, in his biography of Parker, discards all of the aforementioned theories, arguing that since none of the stories were able to provide any hard evidence of Cato or her crew's fate, it is more likely that the ship accidentally caught fire at sea and blew up. Biographer John Charnock comes to the same conclusion.
