= William Peckover =

Royal Navy gunner

William Peckover was a gunner in the Royal Navy and served on several historic expeditions, notably all three of James Cook's journeys to the Pacific (1768-1779) and William Bligh's journey to Tahiti (1787-1790), on which the "Mutiny on the Bounty" occurred. He was one of 18 loyal crew members who were set adrift with Bligh and survived a journey of 3,618 nautical miles (6,700 km; 4,160 mi) in an open boat after the mutiny.

He was born 17 June 1748, son of Daniel Peckover and Mary Avies in Aynho in the Cherwell Valley, Northamptonshire.

== Early navy career ==
Peckover joined Captain Cook's Endeavour expedition aged 21, on 25 July 1768 as an able-bodied seaman. On the return to Britain, he petitioned Joseph Banks requesting to gain him a berth as a midshipman on Cook's next voyage. Peckover wrote "as you were so good to me During your last Voyage & so generous sinc your Return I am Determined to haxard my Life… I ham now Emboldend to solicit your Goodness to have me appointed Supernumery Midshipman in one of the Ships newly Commissioned for the South Seas". He was unsuccessful, but was appointed on 4 February 1772 as gunner's mate in Resolution and departed on Cook's second expedition. On Cook's third and final voyage (on the Discovery), which he joined on 16 February 1776, Peckover was appointed ship's gunner.

== Bounty voyage ==
By the time Peckover was a crewmember on HMAV Bounty he was one of the most experienced on the vessel. He sailed on all three of Captain James Cook's Pacific expeditions, had already visited Tahiti four times and was fluent in the Polynesian language. Bounty landed at Tahiti in October 1788, where Bligh had Peckover supervise trading negotiations with the islanders while breadfruit plants were collected for transportation.

== During the mutiny and subsequent events ==
On 28 April 1789, during the return voyage to England, Peckover had been on watch duty from midnight to 4:00 am and was still asleep when Fletcher Christian seized control of the ship. Peckover was confined to his cabin during the mutiny. When he was allowed on deck, Bligh, along with 18 loyalists including Peckover, were cast off the ship into the 23-foot launch. Peckover was able to smuggle off the Bounty a pocket watch and with this Bligh was able to navigate until 2 June 1788, when Bligh's log records "The Gunner when he left the ship brought his watch with him and had regulated our time until today when unfortunately I found it stopt". The watch had become corroded by sea water. In appreciation Bligh gave Peckover a replacement and had it inscribed "Wm Peckover H.M.S. Bounty 1788 Cap. Bligh".

Peckover survived the 3,618 nautical miles (6,700 km; 4,160 mi), seven-week voyage in Bounty's launch to the Dutch East Indies port of Coupang on Timor and later during the mutineers' court martial in Britain, testified in favour of Midshipman Peter Heywood.

In July 1792, Commodore Pasley, (Peter Heywood's uncle) planned to contact Peckover, who at the time was living in Woolwich. According to a footnote to the "Report of the Court Martial of Ten of the Mutineers", in May 1794, he was living at No. 13 Gun Alley, in Wapping, London.

== Later navy career ==
Peckover served on various ships during Britain's involvement in the American Revolution and Napoleonic Wars.

Royal Navy records state Peckover served as a gunner on the following vessels:

- 30 Oct 1780 - HMS Dictator
- 15 Jul 1782 - HMS Resistance
- 11 Jun 1784 - HMS Recovery
- 16 Dec 1784 - HMS Warspite
- 27 Jan 1785 - HMS Amphitrite
- 24 Aug 1787 - HMAV Bounty
- 1 Dec 1790 - HMS Antelope
- 6 Jun 1791 - HMS Sultan
- 23 Jan 1792 - HMS Antelope
- 6 Feb 1792 - HMS Ocean
- 23 May 1798 - HMS Bedford
- 30 Aug 1798 - HMS Irresistible
- 14 May 1801 - HMS Gelykheid

Peckover applied for a position as gunner on HMS Providence (the second breadfruit expedition to Tahiti) but was refused by Bligh. In a letter to Sir Joseph Banks, 17 July 1791 (two weeks before departure), Bligh wrote:

‘‘Should Peckover my late Gunner ever trouble you to render him further services I shall esteem it a favour if you will tell him I informed you he was a vicious and worthless fellow – He applied to me to render him service & wanted to be appointed Gunner of the Providence but as I had determined never to suffer an officer who was with me in the Bounty to sail with again, it was for the cause I did not apply for him.’’

The last known record of Peckover mentions him serving on HMS Gelykheid; he was superannuated on 10 June 1801; and is not mentioned any further in navy records. Gunner William Peckover, Gentleman of HMS Irresistible was created a Governor of the Chatham Chest.

National Archive records show that Peckover made provision in his pension for a widows pension: He was married to Sarah. Colchester Records Office show that Sarah Peckover was buried at Holy Trinity Church Colchester on 11 March 1819 aged 62 as was William Peckover a few months later on 16 May 1819 aged 70.
