= Melford Hall =

Grade I listed historic house museum in Long Melford, United Kingdom

Coordinates: 52.08254°N 0.72291°E

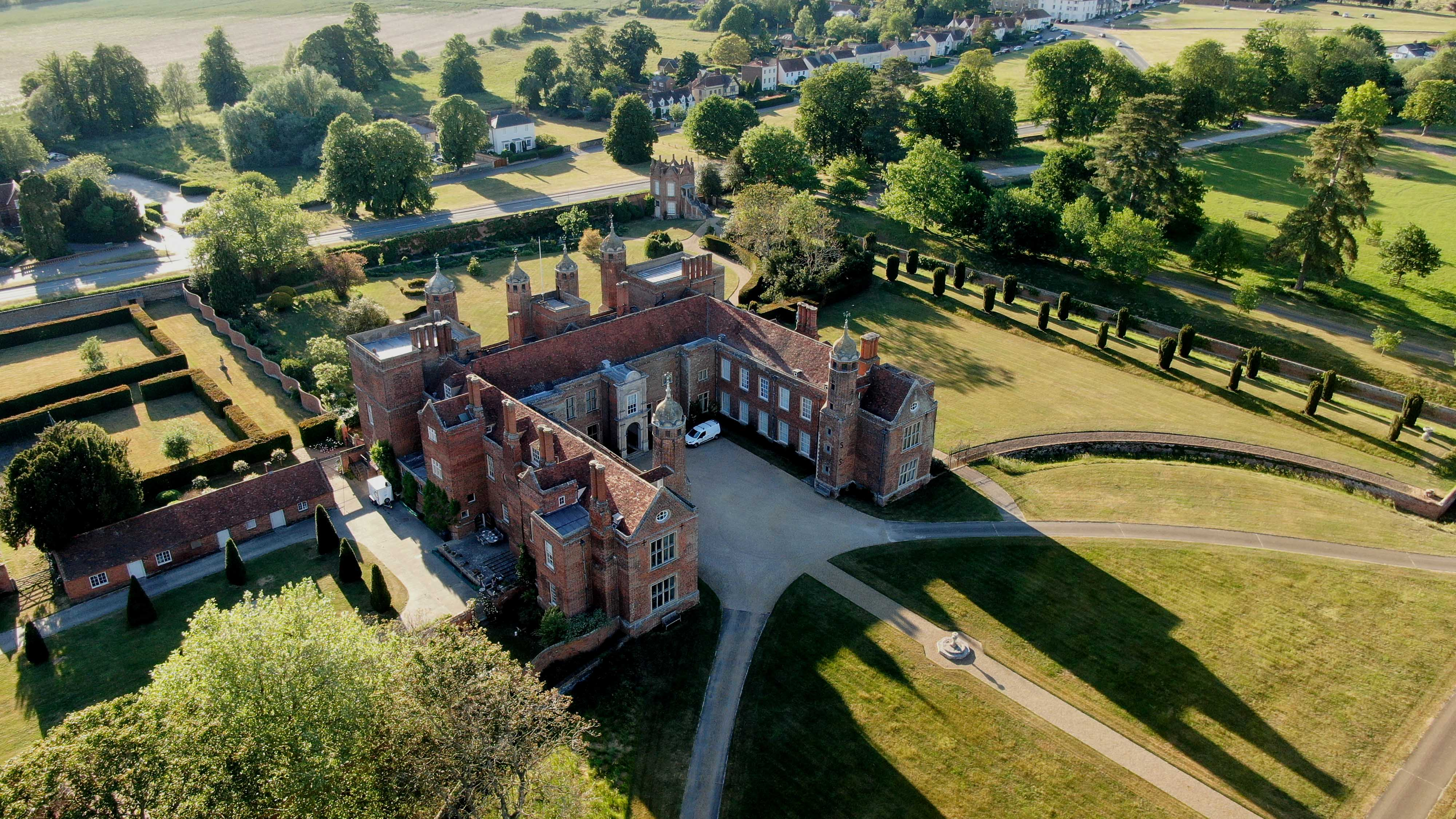

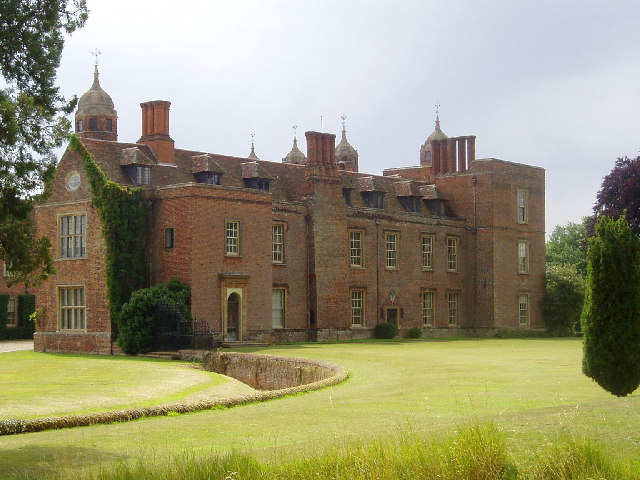
Melford Hall

Melford Hall is a stately home in the village of Long Melford, Suffolk, England. Since 1786 it has been the seat of the Parker Baronets and is still lived in by the Hyde Parker family. Since 1960 it has been owned by the National Trust.

The hall was mostly constructed in the 16th century, incorporating parts of a medieval building held by the abbots of Bury St Edmunds which had been in use since before 1065. It has similar roots to nearby Kentwell Hall.

It passed from the abbots during the Dissolution of the Monasteries and was later granted by Mary I to Sir William Cordell. From Cordell it passed via his sister to Thomas and Mary Savage, before being sold back into another male Cordell line when it was purchased by Sir Robert Cordell, 1st Baronet.

James Howell described the hall and garden in the times of Elizabeth Savage, Countess Rivers in a letter in 1619.

During the Stour Valley Riots of 1642 the house was attacked and damaged by an anti-Catholic crowd. In 1786 it was sold to Sir Harry Parker, 6th Baronet, son of Admiral Sir Hyde Parker, 5th Baronet.

Beatrix Potter was a cousin of the family and was a frequent visitor to the hall from the 1890s onwards.

One wing of the hall was gutted by fire in February 1942 but rebuilt after World War II, retaining the external Tudor brickwork with 1950s interior design.

The hall was first opened to the public in 1955 by Ulla, Lady Hyde Parker. In 1958 Sue Ryder leased the south wing to house her holiday scheme for concentration camp survivors from Poland. This scheme, which ran at Melford Hall for 11 years, eventually grew into her work with charity Sue Ryder.

In 1960 it passed to the National Trust. It is generally open on weekend afternoons in April and October, and on afternoons from Wednesday to Sunday during May to September.

The Hall grounds host a number of events including the "Big Night Out" every November to mark Guy Fawkes Night and from 2013 the annual LeeStock Music Festival
