= Sir Harry Parker, 6th Baronet =

British baronet

Sir Harry Parker, 6th Baronet (1735–1812), was from a naval family and inherited his title on the death of his father, Vice-Admiral Sir Hyde Parker, in 1782. Harry Parker bought Melford Hall in Suffolk in 1786, and the Baronetcy subsequently became known as "of Melford Hall". He was Chief Clerk to the Secretaries of the Board of Admiralty and, between 1782 and 1795, he was the secretary of the Board of Longitude. He retired from public service in 1795, and received a pension of £400. He married Bridget Cresswell in 1775 and had five children, William (who succeeded him as 7th Baronet), Louisa, Edmund, Hyde (who became 8th Baronet), and Sophia. He is buried in a vault in the churchyard of Holy Trinity Church, Long Melford in Suffolk, and there is a large memorial to him and his wife within the church. There is a portrait of him at Melford Hall, now a National Trust property and still the seat of the Hyde Parker family.

Baronetage of England
Preceded by Hyde Parker	Baronet (of Melford Hall); 1782-1812	Succeeded by William Parker
