= LeeStock Music Festival =

Music festival in Suffolk, England

The LeeStock Music Festival (originally known as LeeFest) is an annual music festival, held in Long Melford, Suffolk, England, since 2006 in memory of a local man, Lee Dunford, who died the same year. The festival raises money for the Willow Foundation, a national charity that gives special days to seriously ill young adults. The festival is part of a number of events that aim to raise the profile of the Willow Foundation and raise money for them including a pub crawl, a football match, and a Twenty20 cricket match. Prior to the 2012 festival, LeeStock has raised £25,000 for the Willow Foundation.

In 2011, LeeStock was held over the weekend of 28 and 29 May and featured indie band Dodgy and The Bluetones lead-singer Mark Morriss as the headline acts along with acts from all over the UK. It was held at the White Horse public house in Sudbury.

LeeStock 2012 was moved to the larger capacity home ground of A.F.C. Sudbury, King's Marsh, after selling out in 2011. It was headlined by Mark Morriss, Nigel Clark of Dodgy, D:Ream and Wheatus. The acoustic stage was headlined by Nick Howard who went on to win that year's The Voice of Germany.

In 2013 the festival moved again, to the stately home and National Trust property Melford Hall, in Long Melford. The festival was headlined by Toploader and Space. By early 2014, the festival had raised almost £50,000 for the Willow Foundation and that year's event, held again at Melford Hall, was headlined by the Lightning Seeds and an acoustic set by Terrorvision.
