= Sir Hyde Parker, 5th Baronet =

Royal Navy officer (1714–1782)

Vice-Admiral Sir Hyde Parker Bt
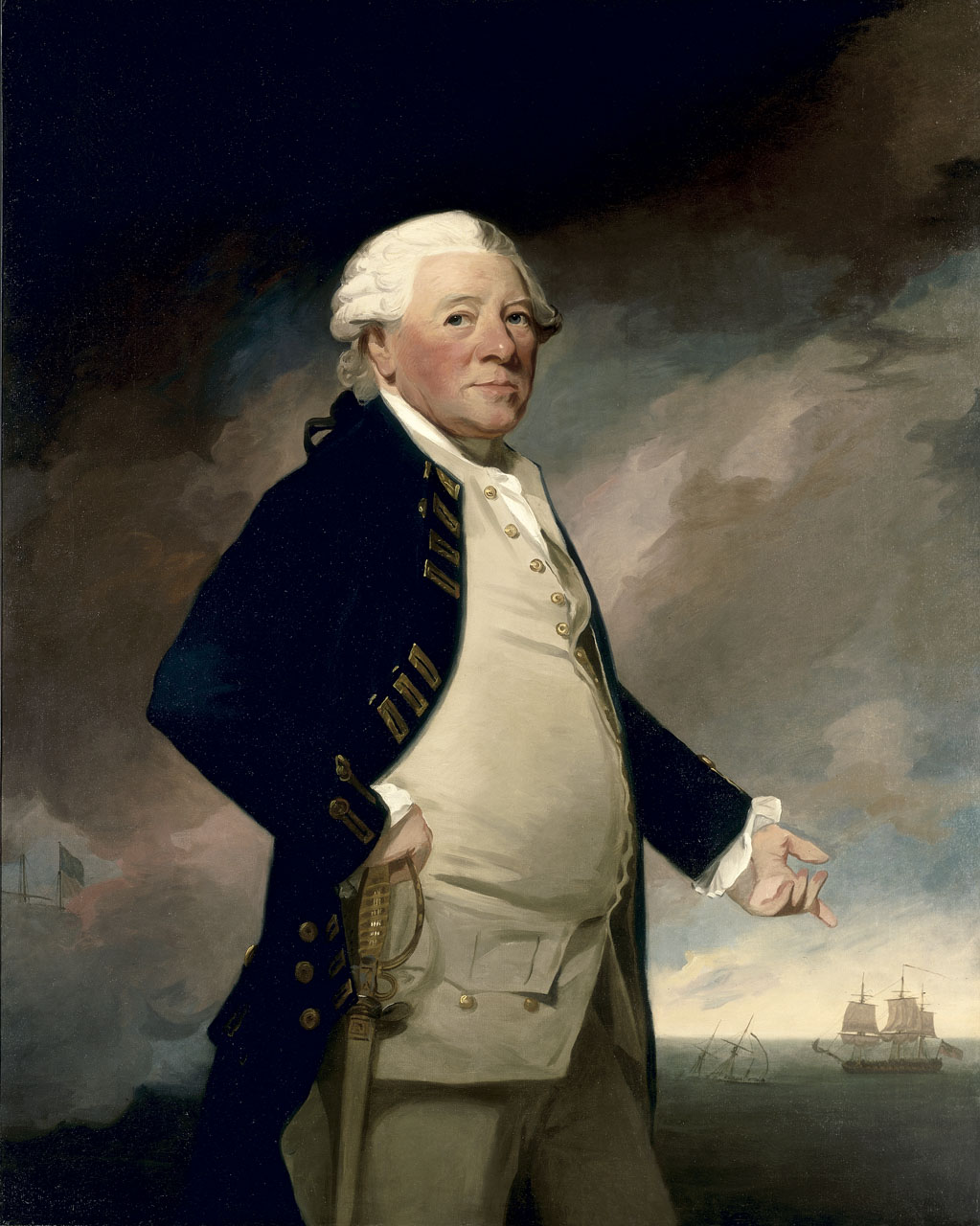
- Portrait by George Romney, c. 1782–1783
- Born: 1 February 1714; Tredington, Worcestershire
- Died: c. January 1783 (aged 67–68) HMS Cato, Indian Ocean
- Allegiance: Great Britain
- Branch: Royal Navy
- Service years: 1738–c. 1783
- Rank: Vice-Admiral of the Blue
- Commands: HMS Squirrel; HMS Panther; HMS Fortitude; HMS Cato
- Conflicts: Seven Years' War; Siege of Pondicherry (1760); Battle of Manila (1762); Action of 2 October 1762; American War of Independence; Fourth Anglo-Dutch War; Battle of Dogger Bank (1781)

Vice-Admiral of the Blue Sir Hyde Parker, 5th Baronet (1 February 1714 – c. January 1783) was a Royal Navy officer. Parker was born in Tredington. His father, a clergyman, was a son of Sir Henry Parker, 2nd Baronet. He began his career at sea in the merchant service. Entering the Royal Navy at the age of 24, he was made lieutenant in 1744, and in 1748 he was made post-captain. In his Royal Navy career, he captured a Spanish galleon that was worth £600,000. (Note: £600,000 was the amount when they captured the ship. As of 2017, it would be worth around £106 million.) This gave his family its wealth.

== Early life ==
Hyde Parker was born at Tredington on 1 February 1714. His father, a clergyman, was a son of Sir Henry Parker, 2nd Baronet. Parker began his career at sea onboard merchantmen before joining the Royal Navy in 1738 at the age twenty-four. He was promoted to lieutenant in 1744 and again to post-captain in 1748.

== Seven Years War ==
In October 1755 Parker commissioned the newly launched post ship HMS Squirrel. A year later, while sailing in her, he captured the French privateer Très Vénėrable. During the latter part of the Seven Years' War he served in the East Indies, taking part in the capture of Pondicherry in 1761 and the capture of Manila in 1762. In the action of 2 October 1762 Parker with two ships captured a Spanish Manila galleon in her voyage between Acapulco and Manila.

== American War of Independence ==
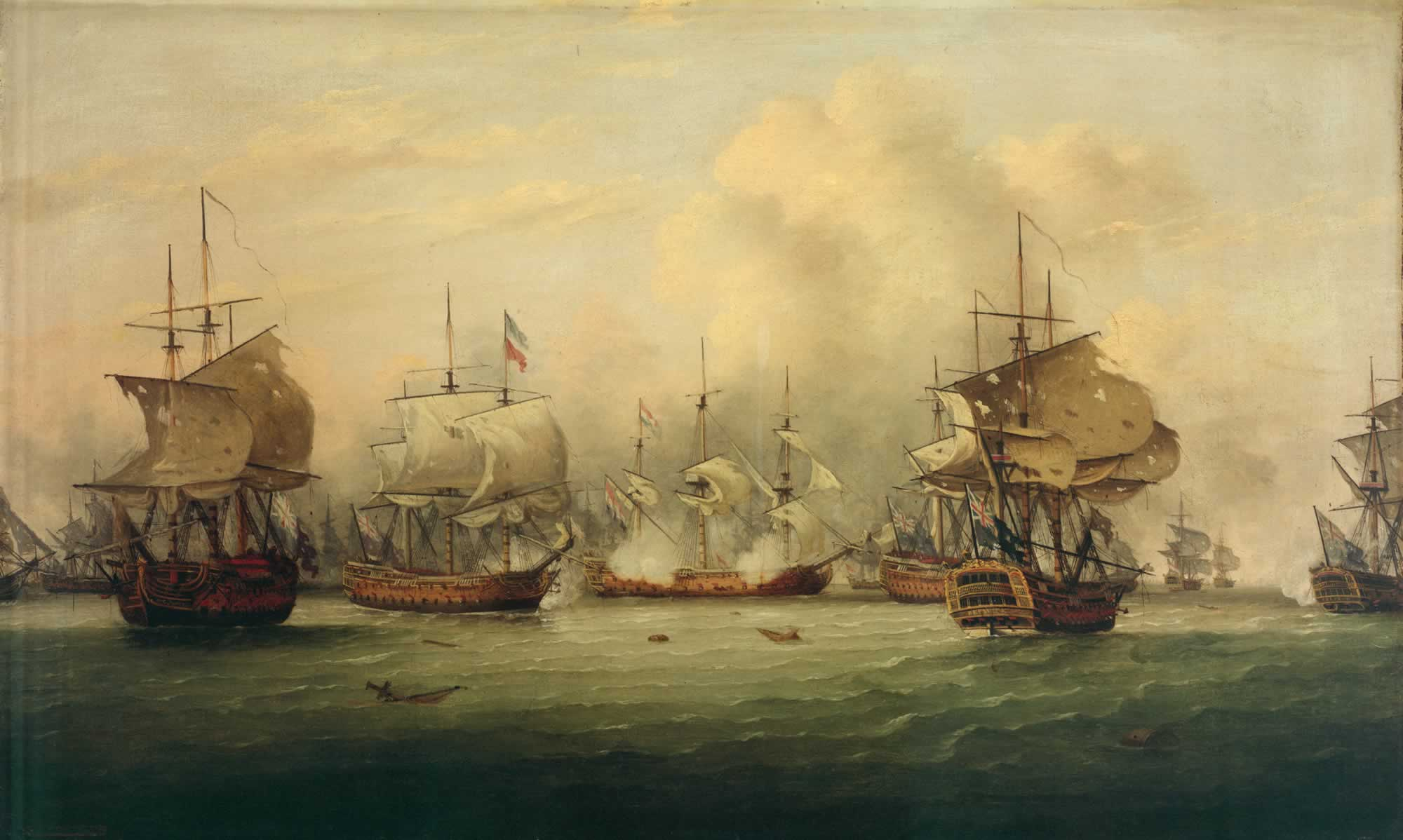
The Battle of Dogger Bank, at which Parker fought to a draw

In 1778 he was promoted to Rear-Admiral of the White and went to North American waters as second-in-command. For some time before Admiral of the White Sir George Rodney's arrival he was in command on the Leeward Islands station, and conducted a skilful campaign against the French at Martinique. On 26 September 1780 he was promoted again to Vice-Admiral of the Blue and on 5 August 1781 fell in with a Dutch fleet of about his own strength, though far better equipped, near the Dogger Bank. After a fiercely contested battle, in which neither combatant gained any advantage, both sides drew off. Parker considered that he had not been properly equipped for his task, and insisted on resigning his command.

In 1782 he accepted the command East Indies Station, though he had just succeeded to the family baronetcy. On the outward voyage his flagship, HMS Cato was lost with all hands in c. January 1783. He was succeeded by his eldest son Harry Parker, the sixth Baronet. Parker's second son was Admiral Sir Hyde Parker (1739–1807).

== Descendants ==
Currently, his descendants live in the south wing of Melford Hall.

== Notes ==
Baronetage of England
Preceded by Henry Parker	Baronet (of Melford Hall); 1782	Succeeded by Harry Parker
