= Parker baronets of Ratton (1674) =

Escutcheon of the Parker baronets of Ratton

The Parker baronetcy, of Ratton in the County of Sussex, was created in the Baronetage of England on 22 May 1674 for Robert Parker, Member of Parliament for Hastings.

The 2nd Baronet was Member of Parliament for Sussex. The title became extinct in 1750, upon the death of the 1st Baronet's grandson, the 3rd Baronet.

== Parker baronets, of Ratton (1674) ==
- Sir Robert Parker, 1st Baronet (c.1655–1691)
- Sir George Parker, 2nd Baronet (c.1673–1727)
- Sir Walter Parker, 3rd Baronet (c.1700–1750)
