= Parker baronets of Shenstone Lodge (1844) =

Escutcheon of the Parker baronets of Shenstone Lodge

The Parker baronetcy, of Shenstone Lodge in the County of Stafford, was created in the Baronetage of the United Kingdom on 18 December 1844 for the naval officer Sir William Parker. He commanded British naval forces in the First Opium War.

== Parker baronets, of Shenstone Lodge (1844) ==
- Admiral Sir William Parker, GCB, 1st Baronet (1781–1866)
- Sir William Biddulph Parker, 2nd Baronet (1824–1902)
- Sir William Lorenzo Parker, OBE, 3rd Baronet (1889–1971), Olympic medallist 1912 for rowing.
- Sir William Alan Parker, 4th Baronet (1916–1990)
- Sir William Peter Brian Parker, 5th Baronet (born 1950).

The heir presumptive to the baronetcy is Timothy John Parker (born 1959), cousin to the 5th Baronet.

== Extended family ==
Sir Thomas Parker, grandfather of the 1st Baronet, was Lord Chief Baron of the Exchequer. George Parker (1827–1904), second son of the 1st Baronet, was an Admiral in the Royal Navy.
