= Rear-Admiral of the Blue =

Rank of the navy of Great Britain

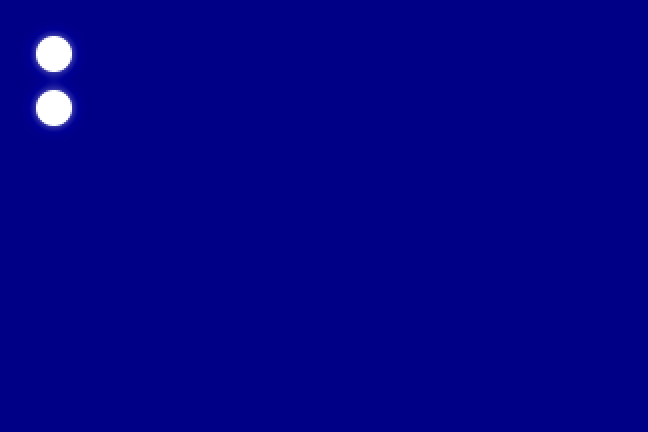
- Command flag (1702–1864)
- Country: United Kingdom
- Service branch: Royal Navy
- Abbreviation: RAB
- Next higher rank: Rear-Admiral of the White
- Next lower rank: Commodore of the red, first class

Rear-Admiral of the Blue was a senior rank of the Royal Navy of the United Kingdom, immediately outranked by the rank Rear-Admiral of the White. Royal Navy officers currently holding the ranks of commodore, rear admiral, vice admiral and admiral of the fleet are sometimes considered generically to be admirals. From 1688 to 1805 this rank was in order of precedence ninth; after 1805 it was the tenth. In 1864 it was abolished as a promotional rank (pictured adjacent is the command flag for a Rear-Admiral of the Blue).

== History ==
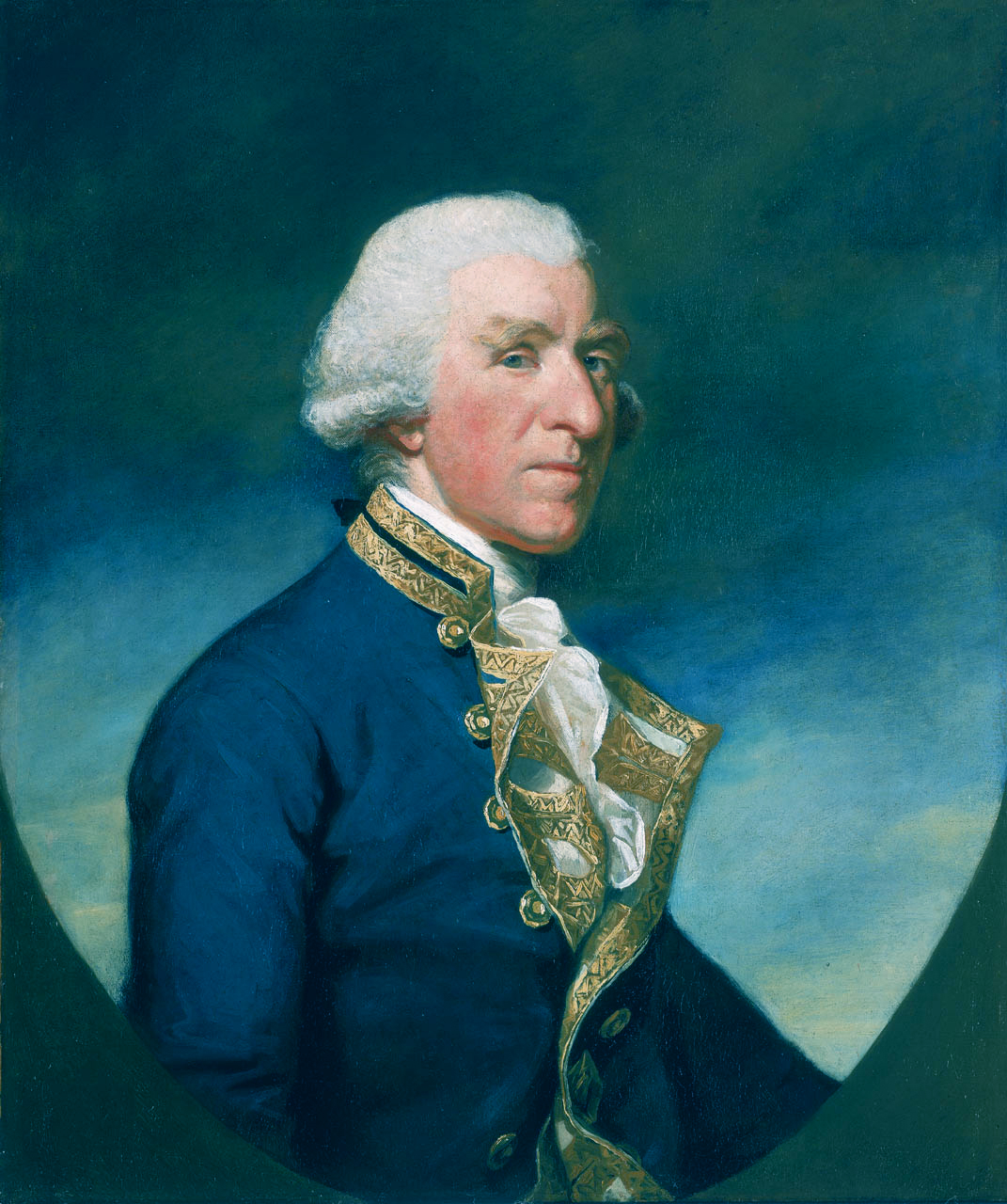
1784 portrait of Sir Samuel Hood as Rear-Admiral of the Blue

The Tudor navy inaugurated squadron colours during the reign of Elizabeth I (1558-1603) to subdivide the English fleet into three squadrons. There were three classes of admirals, differentiated by using coloured flags. In 1620 the establishment of the official Flag ranks of Admiral, Vice Admiral, and Rear Admiral arose directly out of the organisation of the fleet into three parts. In 1688 the rank of Admiral of the Fleet was formally created.

The Rear-Admiral of the Blue was a senior rank of the Royal Navy of the United Kingdom, immediately outranked by the rank Rear-Admiral of the White (see order of precedence below). Royal Navy officers currently holding the ranks of commodore, rear admiral, vice admiral and admiral of the fleet are sometimes considered generically to be admirals. From 1688 to 1805 this rank was in order of precedence ninth; after 1805 it was the tenth. In 1864 it was abolished as a promotional rank.

== Order of precedence Admirals of the Colour ==
The Navy was divided into three squadrons Red, White and Blue in order of seniority. Admirals were appointed to these squadrons and therefore their rank and squadron split the seniority originally into nine bands then later 10 with "Admiral of the Fleet" as senior to all others.

Seniority was therefore from 1805 to 1864:

1. Admiral of the Fleet
2. Admiral of the Red Squadron (rank created in 1805)
3. Admiral of the White Squadron
4. Admiral of the Blue Squadron
5. Vice-Admiral of the Red Squadron
6. Vice-Admiral of the White Squadron
7. Vice-Admiral of the Blue Squadron
8. Rear-Admiral of the Red Squadron
9. Rear-Admiral of the White Squadron
10. Rear-Admiral of the Blue Squadron

Admirals without an appointment were colloquially referred to as Yellow Admirals. Ships of the Royal Navy flew the Ensign that coincided with the squadron of their commanding officer.

== See also ==
- List of command flags of the Royal Navy
