= Ratton =

Ratton is a surname, and may refer to:

- Daisy Ratton, stage name Daisy Burrell (1892–1982), English actress, real name
- Helvécio Ratton (born 1949), Brazilian film director, producer and screenwriter
- Jácome Ratton (1736–1820), Franco-Portuguese merchant and mill-owner
- Virginia Pérez-Ratton, pseudonym of Virginia Pérez Johnston (1950–2010), Costa Rican artist, art historian, art critic and curator

== See also ==
- Ratton Estate, now part of Hampden Park, Eastbourne
- Ratton School in Eastbourne, England
