= Parker baronets of Arwaton (1661) =

The Parker, later Parker-a-Morley-Long baronetcy, of Arwaton in the County of Suffolk, was created in the Baronetage of England on 16 July 1661 for Philip Parker, Member of Parliament for Harwich and Sandwich. He was the son of Sir Philip Parker, Member of Parliament (MP) in the 1640s. He was three times married, his first wife being a daughter of Sir Walter Long, 1st Baronet MP, and his third wife daughter of Joachim Matthews MP.

His grandson, the 3rd Baronet, also represented Harwich in the House of Commons. He assumed the additional surnames of a-Morley Long. The title became extinct on his death in 1741.

== Parker baronets, of Arwaton (1661) ==
- Sir Philip Parker, 1st Baronet (c. 1625–1690)
- Sir Philip Parker, 2nd Baronet(c. 1650–c. 1698), succeeded his father in 1690. On 12 March 1680 in London, he married Mary Fortrey, daughter of Samuel Fortrey, the son of the builder of the old Kew Palace. They had two daughters, and one son: Catherine (1690–1749), who married John Perceval, 1st Earl of Egmont; Mary (1692–1731), who married Daniel Dering (grandson of Sir Edward Dering, 2nd Baronet); and Philip, 3rd Baronet.
- Sir Philip Parker-a-Morley-Long, 3rd Baronet (1682–1741), left no heir.

Coat of arms of Parker of Arwaton
Crest Out of a crown or, a Bear's Head couped sable, muzzled and chained or. Escutcheon Ar. betw. two bars. sa. charged with three bezants a lion pass. gu. in chief three bucks' heads cabossed of the second. Motto Quis prohibeat sperare meliora
