= Vice-Admiral of the Blue =

Rank of the Royal Navy

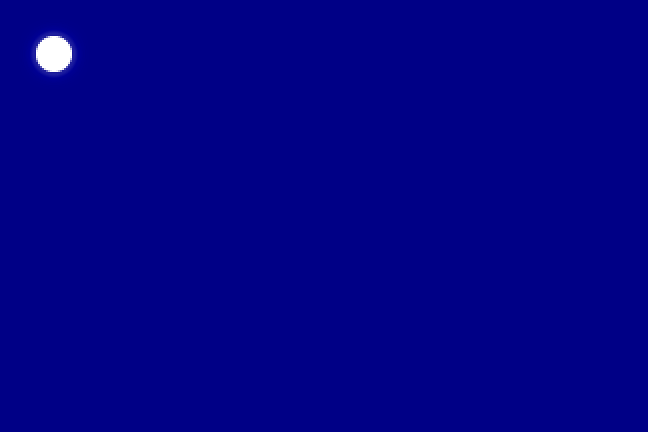
- Command flag (1624–1864)
- Country: United Kingdom
- Service branch: Royal Navy
- Abbreviation: VAB
- Next higher rank: Vice-Admiral of the White
- Next lower rank: Rear-Admiral of the Red

Vice-Admiral of the Blue was a senior rank of the Royal Navy of the United Kingdom, immediately outranked by the rank Vice-Admiral of the White (see order of precedence below). Royal Navy officers currently holding the ranks of commodore, rear admiral, vice admiral and admiral of the fleet are sometimes considered generically to be admirals. From 1688 to 1805 this rank was in order of precedence sixth; after 1805 it was the seventh. In 1864 it was abolished as a promotional rank. The command flag for a Vice-Admiral of the Blue is pictured opposite.

== History ==
Portrait of Charles Saunders as Vice-Admiral of the Blue

The Navy Royal inaugurated squadron colours during the reign of Elizabeth I (1558–1603) to subdivide the English fleet into three squadrons. There were three classes of admirals and differentiated by using coloured flags. In 1620 the official flag ranks of Admiral, Vice Admiral, and Rear Admiral were legally established that arose directly out of the organisation of the fleet into three parts. In 1688 the official rank of Admiral of the Fleet was formally introduced.

The Vice-Admiral of the Blue was a senior rank of the Royal Navy of the United Kingdom, immediately outranked by the rank Vice-Admiral of the White (see order of precedence below). Royal Navy officers currently holding the ranks of commodore, rear admiral, vice admiral and admiral of the fleet are sometimes considered generically to be admirals. From 1688 to 1805 this rank was in order of precedence sixth; after 1805 it was the seventh. In 1864 it was abolished as a promotional rank.

== Order of precedence Admirals of the Colour ==
The Navy was divided into three squadrons Red, White and Blue in order of seniority. Admirals were appointed to these squadrons and therefore their rank and squadron split the seniority originally into 9 bands then later 10 with ‘Admiral of the Fleet' as senior to all others.

Seniority was therefore from 1805 to 1864:

1. Admiral of the Fleet
2. Admiral of the Red Squadron (rank created in 1805)
3. Admiral of the White Squadron
4. Admiral of the Blue Squadron
5. Vice-Admiral of the Red Squadron
6. Vice-Admiral of the White Squadron
7. Vice-Admiral of the Blue Squadron
8. Rear-Admiral of the Red Squadron
9. Rear-Admiral of the White Squadron
10. Rear-Admiral of the Blue Squadron

Seniority was therefore from 1688 to 1805:

1. Admiral of the Fleet (rank created in 1688)
2. Admiral of the White Squadron
3. Admiral of the Blue Squadron
4. Vice-Admiral of the Red Squadron
5. Vice-Admiral of the White Squadron
6. Vice-Admiral of the Blue Squadron
7. Rear-Admiral of the Red Squadron
8. Rear-Admiral of the White Squadron
9. Rear-Admiral of the Blue Squadron

Admirals without an appointment were colloquially referred to as Yellow Admirals. Ships of the Royal Navy flew the Ensign that coincided with the squadron of their commanding officer.

== Books ==
Publications about the Vice-Admiral of the Blue include:

- Roland Burnham Molineux, The Vice Admiral Of The Blue: A Biographical Romance: Supposedly The Chronicle Left By Lord Nelson's Friend, Thomas Masterman Hardy, Vice Admiral And Baronet ISBN 978-1173363093

== See also ==
- List of command flags of the Royal Navy
