= Science and invention in Birmingham =

Birmingham is one of England's principal industrial centres and has a history of industrial and scientific innovation. It was once known as 'city of a thousand trades' and in 1791, Arthur Young (the writer and commentator on British economic life) described Birmingham as "the first manufacturing town in the world". Right up until the mid-19th century Birmingham was regarded as the prime industrial urban town in Britain and perhaps the world, the town's rivals were more specific in their trade bases. Mills and foundries across the world were helped along by the advances in steam power and engineering that were taking place in the city. The town offered a vast array of industries and was the world's leading manufacturer of metal ware, although this was by no means the only trade flourishing in the town.

By the year 2000, of the 4,000 inventions copyrighted annually in the UK, 2,800 came from within a 35-mile radius of Birmingham. Peter Colegate of the Patent Office stated that "Every year, Birmingham amazes us by coming up with thousands of inventions. It is impossible to explain but people in the area seem to have a remarkable ability to come up with, and have the dedication to produce, ideas."

While the time line of industry and innovation listed below is extensive, it is by no means a comprehensive list of Birmingham's industrial and scientific achievements, more a guide to highlight the great diversity in the city's industrial might, which can still be seen today.

== Pre-17th century ==
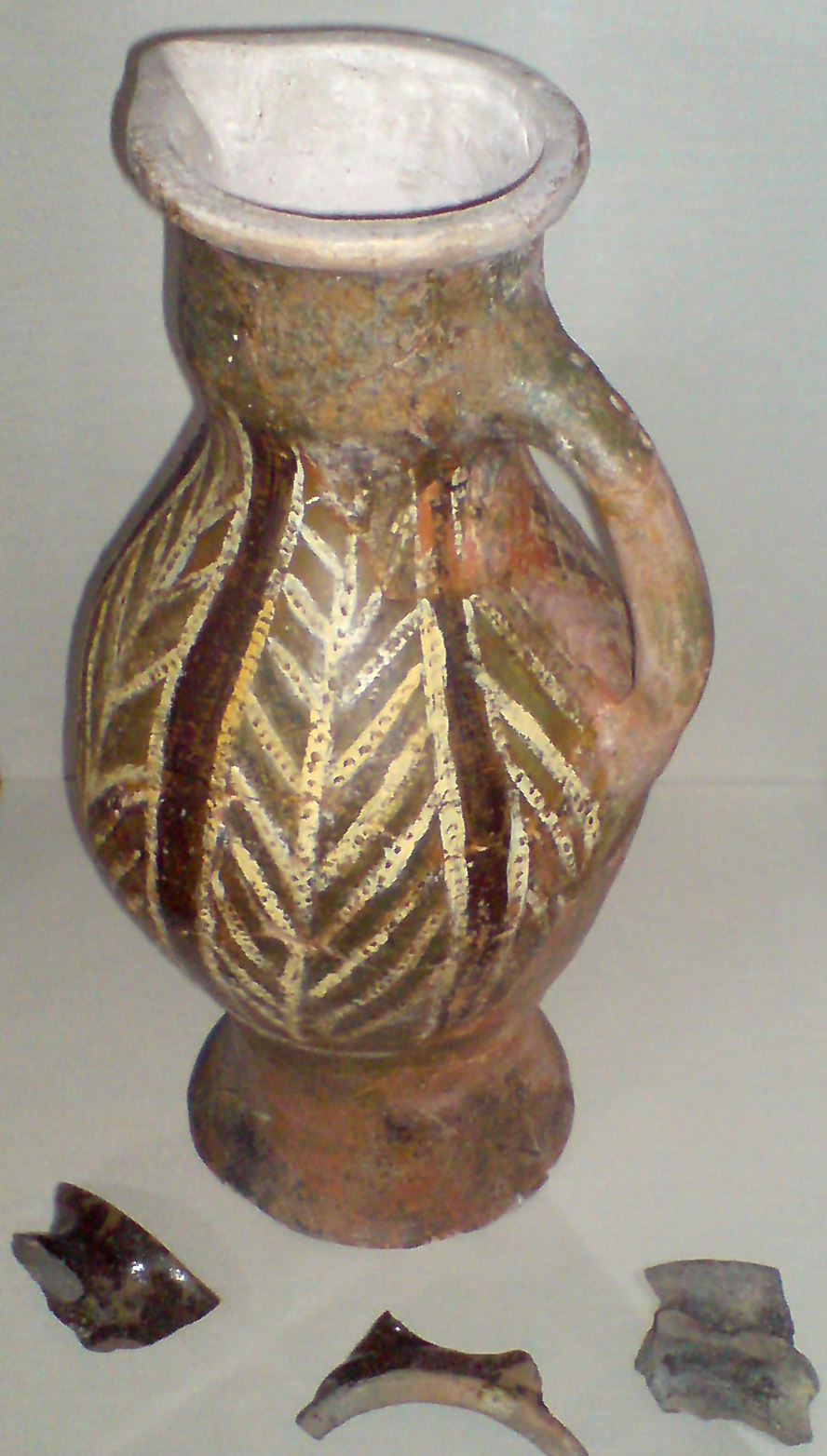
Deritend ware

Birmingham's reputation for trade and innovation really begins to take off in the 12th century with the expansion of a market held there by the De Birmingham family. Around this time the Birmingham Bull Ring begins to take shape, and with the town's markets there arises a necessity to produce items good enough to be sold elsewhere.

Medieval crafts in the town include textiles, leather working and iron working, with archaeological evidence also suggesting the presence of pottery, tile manufacture and probably the working of bone and horn. The following period sees the new town expand rapidly in highly favourable economic circumstances and there is archaeological evidence of small-scale industries taking place such as kilns producing the distinctive local Deritend ware pottery.

The following decades, Birmingham becomes very productive in several trades metal working, including making small, high value items, possibly jewellery or metal ornaments, for Master of the Knights Templar. They are sufficiently well known to be referred to without explanation as far away as London.

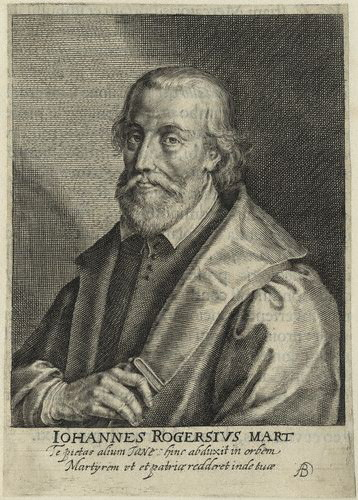
John Rogers, the compiler and editor of the 1537 Matthew Bible

Birmingham's first notable literary figure is John Rogers, the compiler and editor of the 1537 Matthew Bible, parts of which he also translates. This is the first complete authorised version of the Bible to be printed in the English language and the most influential of the early English printed Bibles, providing the basis for the later Great Bible and the Authorized King James Version. Rogers' 1548 translation of Philip Melanchthon's Weighing of the Interim, possibly translated in Deritend, is the first book by a Birmingham man known to have been printed in England.

By the early 16th century Birmingham has already evolved into a well established arms manufacturing town, in 1538 churchman John Leialand passes through the Midlands and writes:

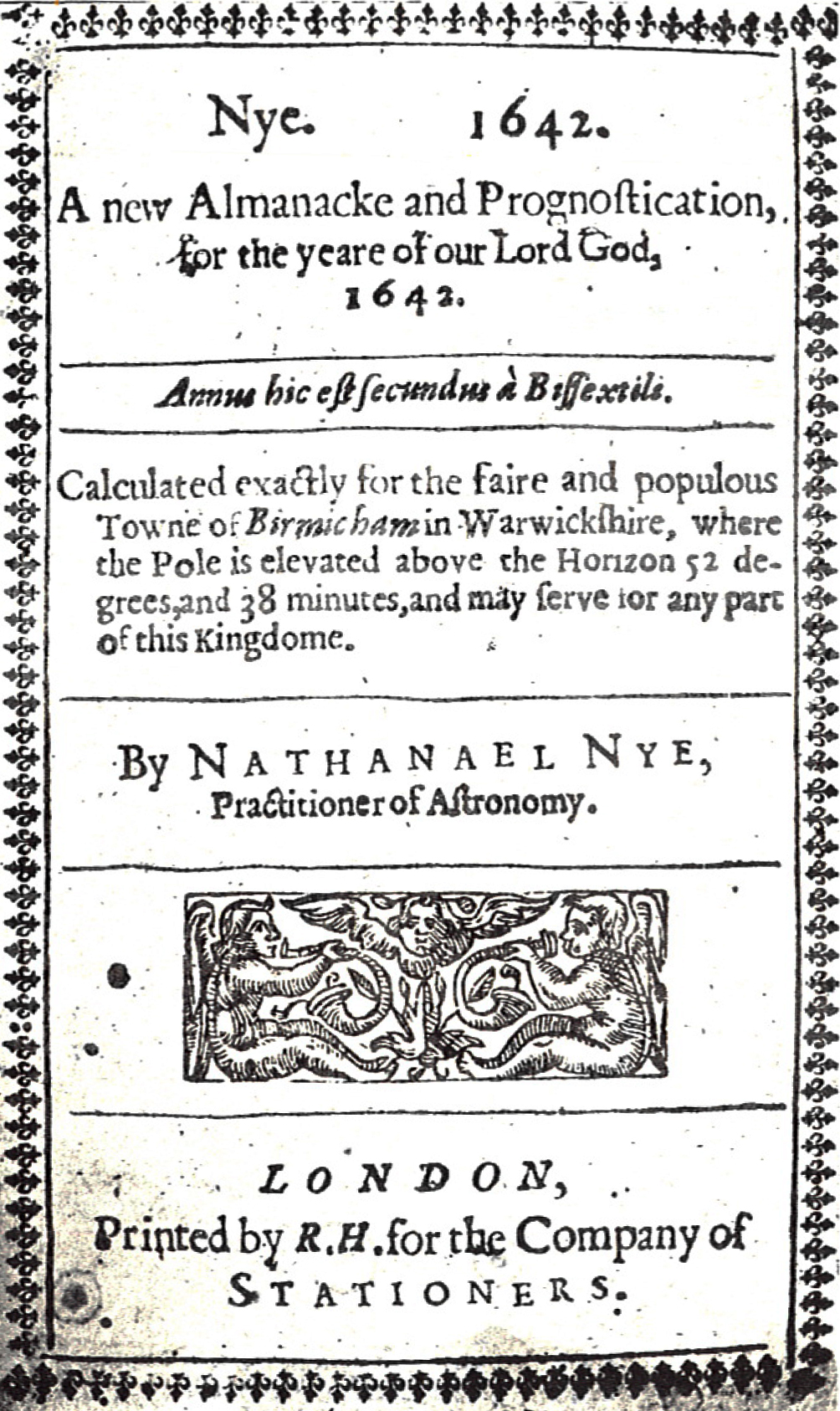
Frontispiece of Nye's New Almanacke and Prognostication for 1642

I came through a praty street or ever I entered Bermingham. This street, as I remember, is called Dirty (Deritend). In it dwells smiths and cutlers and there is a brooke that divides this street from Bermingham ........ There be many smiths in the towne, that use to make knives and all manner of cutting tools, and many lorimers that make bittes, and a great many naylours, so that a great part of the towne is maintained by smiths, who have their iron and sea-coal out of Staffordshire."

Birmingham loses its Lord of the manor in the 16th century, and the district as a whole remains an area of weak lordship throughout the following centuries. With local government remaining essentially manorial, the townspeoples' resulting high degree of economic and social freedom is to be a highly significant factor in Birmingham's subsequent development.

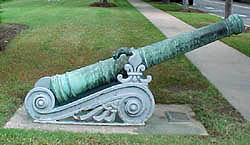
17th-century European saker cannon

In 1642 the early Birmingham mathematician and astronomer Nathaniel Nye publishes A New Almanacke and Prognostication calculated exactly for the faire and populous Towne of Birmicham in Warwickshire, where the Pole is elevated above the Horizon 52 degrees and 38 minutes, and may serve for any part of this Kingdome.

Birmingham's principal tradesmen during the English Civil War were the smiths, who were called upon to manufacture over 15,000 sword blades, these are supplied to Parliamentarian forces only. One of the town's leading minds, 'Nathaniel Nye' is recorded as testing a Birmingham cannon in 1643. Nye also experimented with a saker in Deritend in 1645. From 1645 he became the master gunner to the Parliamentarian garrison at Evesham and in 1646 he successfully directs the artillery at the Siege of Worcester, detailing his experiences and in his 1647 book The Art of Gunnery, believing that war is as much a science as an art.

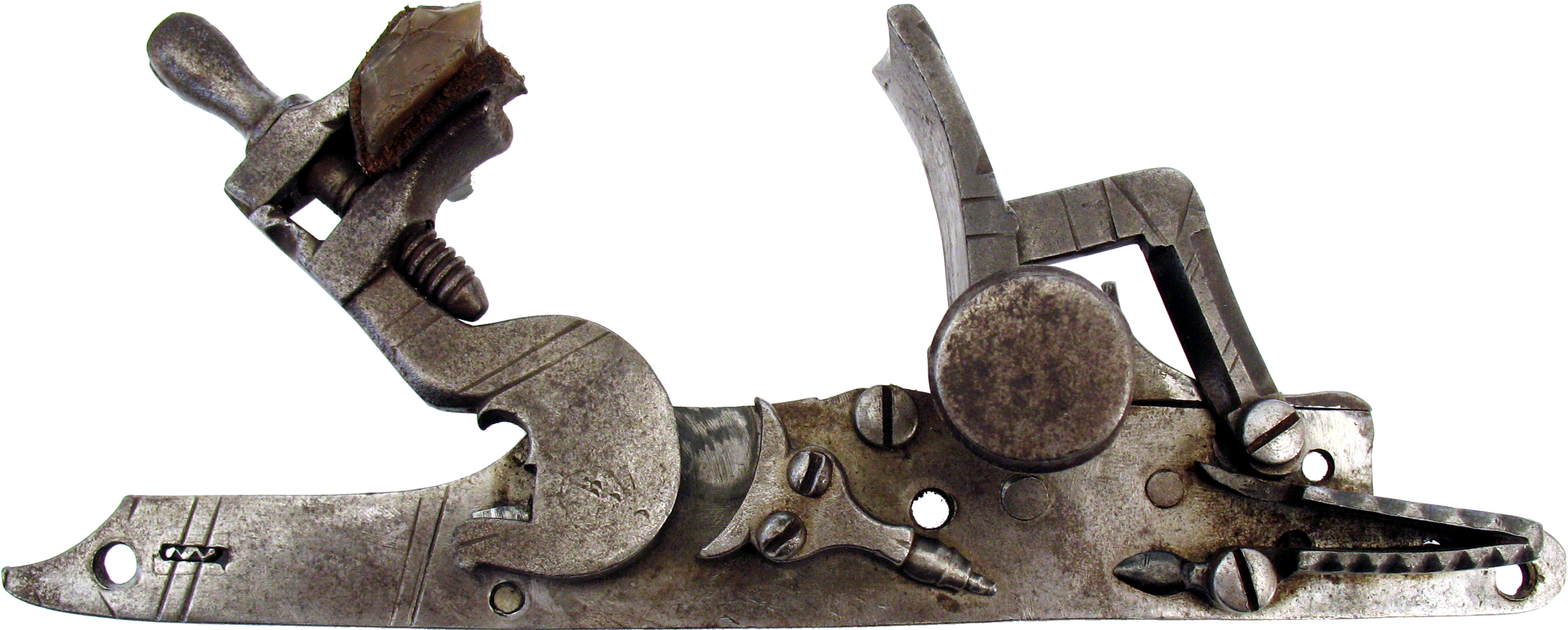
External view of a cocked 17th century snaphance lock on musket, a weapon Birmingham was selling to London.

The earliest known clock makers in the town arrived from London in 1667. Between 1770 and 1870 there are over 700 clock and watch makers in the town.

In 1689 Sir Richard Newdigate, one of the new, local Newdigate baronets, approaches manufacturers in the town with the notion of supplying the British Government with small arms. It is stressed that they would need to be of high enough calibre to equal the small arms that were being imported from abroad. After a successful trial order in 1692, the government places its first contract. On 5 January 1693, the "Officers of Ordnance" chooses five local firearms manufacturers to initially produce 200 "snaphance musquets" per month over the period of one year, paying 17 shillings per musket, plus 3 shillings per hundredweight for delivery to London. During the 18th century, Birmingham became the leading supplier of guns for the expanding British Empire.

== 18th century ==
1722: Richard Baddeley, ironmonger, patents a method for "casting wheel streaks and box irons".

1727: Birmingham is becoming a hot-bed of creative activity and local businessman and bookseller Thomas Warren opens a bookshop in the Birmingham's High Street. Warren is an influential figure in Birmingham at this time.

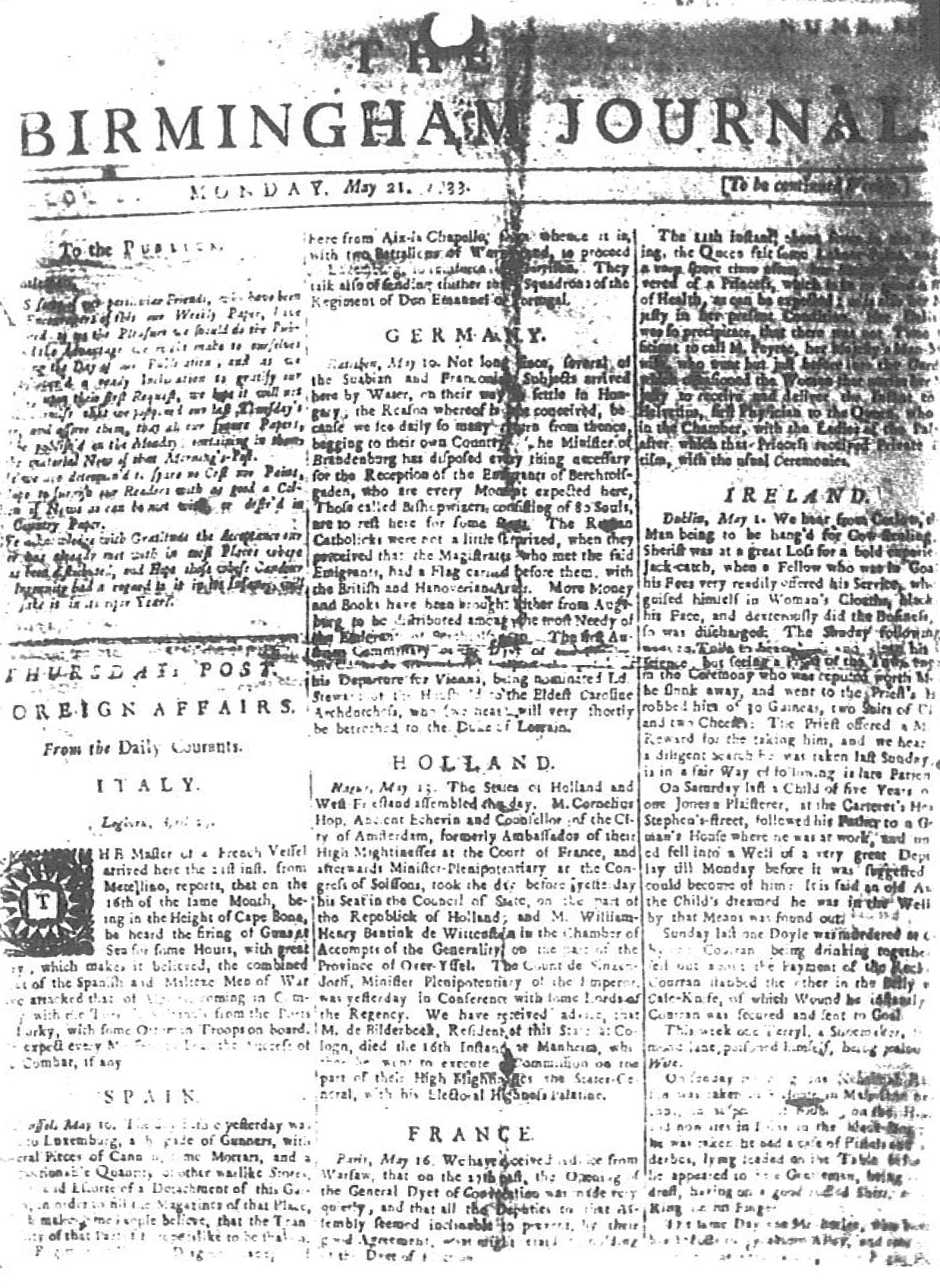
The only known surviving copy of the Birmingham Journal, dated 21 May 1733

1732: The Birmingham Journal is founded and published from Thomas Warren's book store. This is possibly Birmingham's first weekly newspaper; one of its contributors is the very notable Samuel Johnson of nearby Lichfield.

1733: Thomas Warren edits and publishes Samuel Johnson's first original writing—a translation of Jerónimo Lobo's Voyage to Abyssinia. Johnson works for the Journal while he lodges with Warren. Johnson later moves on to greater things and James Boswell writes of Johnson's life: "After nine years of work, Johnson's A Dictionary of the English Language was published in 1755; it had a far-reaching effect on Modern English and has been described as "one of the greatest single achievements of scholarship". The dictionary brings Johnson popularity and success. Until the completion of the Oxford English Dictionary 150 years later, Johnson's dictionary is among the most influential dictionaries in the history of the English language.

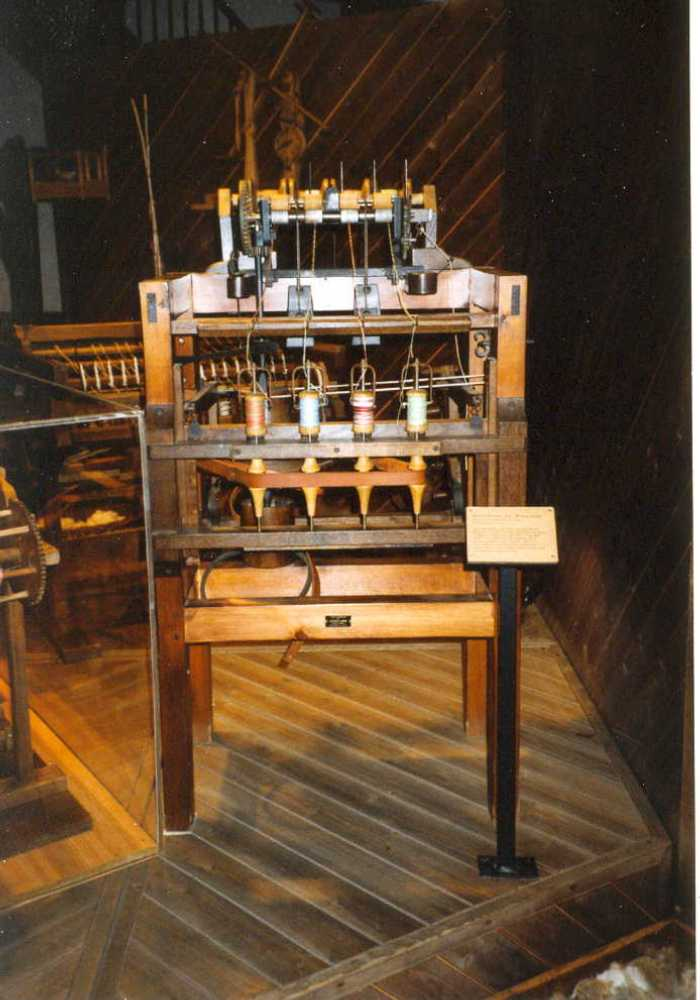
Model of a water frame inspired by Lewis Paul and John Wyatt's early cotton spinning mnachine.

1738: Lewis Paul and John Wyatt, of Birmingham, patent the roller spinning machine and the flyer-and-bobbin system, for drawing cotton to a more even thickness, using two sets of rollers that travel at different speeds. This principle later becomes the basis of Richard Arkwright's water frame.

1741: John Wyatt, mechanic and inventor, designs and constructs a cart-weighing machine, later referred to as a compound lever weighing machine; the design works by way of levers that hold in place a platform, no matter where the weight is placed the load is transferred to a central lever. Weights attached to that lever then help in obtaining a reading of accurate weight. The simplicity, efficiency and accuracy of the weighing machine prove extremely popular across England, subsequently weighing errors are reduced to approximately one pound per ton, this remains a high standard of measurement into the mid-19th century.

1741: The Upper Priory Cotton Mill opens as the world's first mechanised cotton-spinning factory. It is financed by local businessman Thomas Warren, and opened by John Wyatt and Lewis Paul.

1742: John Baskerville takes out a patent for making metal mouldings, rolling, grinding and japanning metal plates by use of weights, rollers and pickling, which Baskerville uses over the more traditional method of employing screws. This is the first patent for making metal mouldings by passing them through rolls of a certain profile.

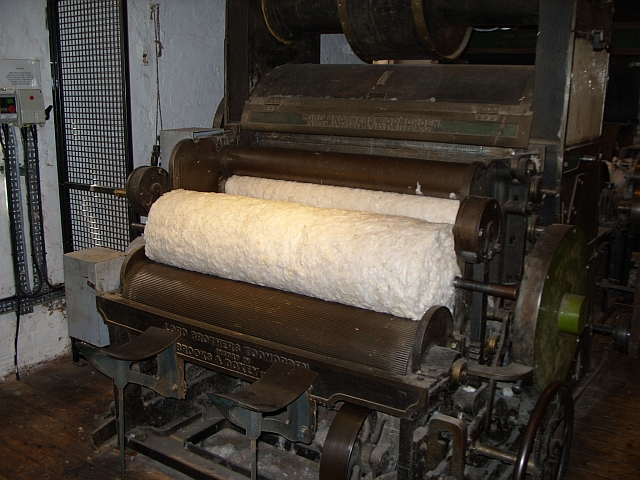
A restored carding machine at Quarry Bank Mill in the UK.

1743: A factory opens in Northampton, fifty spindles turned on five of Paul and Wyatt's machines proving more successful than their first mill. This operates until 1764.

1746: The Colmore family release land on what is later to be known as the Jewellery Quarter to help satisfy the demands of an increasing population.

1746: A sulphuric acid factory is set up at Steelhouse Lane to use the lead chamber process invented by its co-founder John Roebuck. Roebuck and local businessman Samuel Garbett later relocate to Prestonpans in Scotland, taking with them several skilled men from the Birmingham factory. It is here in 1762 where Roebuck takes out a patent for making malleable iron.

1748: Lewis Paul invents the hand driven carding machine. A coat of wire slips are placed around a card, which is then wrapped around a cylinder. Lewis's invention is later developed and improved by Richard Arkwright and Samuel Crompton, although this comes about under great suspicion after a fire at Daniel Bourn's factory in Leominster that specifically uses Paul and Wyatt's spindles. Bourn produces a similar patent in the same year.

1757: Rev John Dyer of Northampton recognises the importance of the Paul and Wyatt cotton spinning machine in poem:

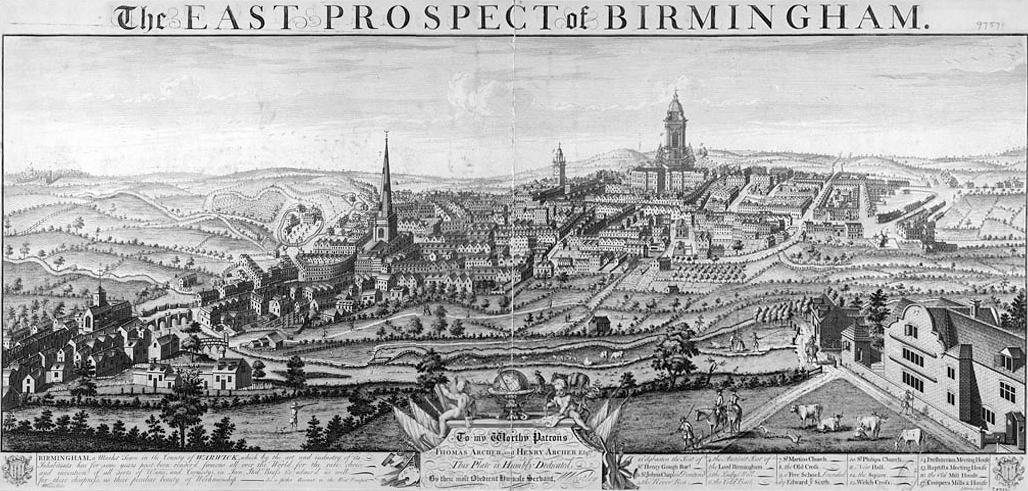
Birmingham on the cusp of the Industrial Revolution in 1732

A circular machine, of new design
In conic shape: it draws and spins a thread
Without the tedious toil of needless hands.
A wheel, invisible, beneath the floor,
To ev'ry member of th' harmonius frame,
Gives necessary motion. One, intent,
O'erlooks the work; the carded wool, he says,
Is smoothly lapp'd around those cylinders,
Which, gently turning, yield it to yon' cirque
Of upright spindles, which with rapid whirl
Spin out, in long extent, an even twine.

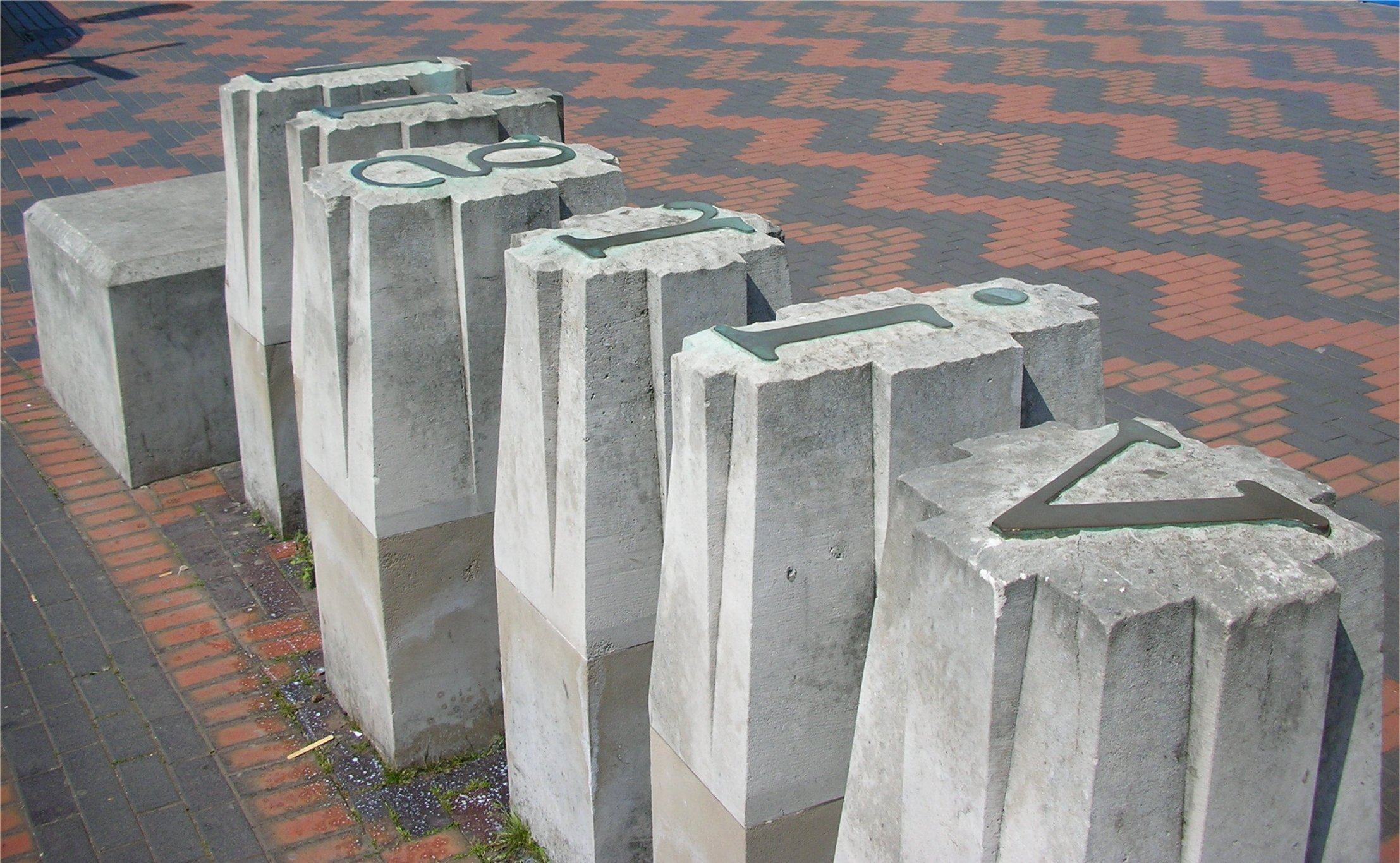
Industry and Genius, 1990, by David Patten, sculpture dedicated to John Baskerville in Centenary Square

1757: Baskerville serif typeface is designed by John Baskerville (1706–1775) in Birmingham, England. Baskerville is classified as a transitional typeface, positioned between the old style typefaces of William Caslon, and the modern styles of Giambattista Bodoni and Firmin Didot.

1758: Paul and Wyatt improve their Roller Spinning machine and take out a second patent. Richard Arkwright later uses this as the model for his water frame.

Meeting of the Lunar Society late 18th century, possibly at Soho House

1758: Benjamin Franklin first travels to Birmingham "to improve and increase Acquaintance among Persons of Influence", and later returns in 1760 to conduct experiments with Boulton on electricity and sound. Franklin remains a common link among many of the early Lunar Society members.

1759: A patent is granted to Thomas Blockley (locksmith), for rolling iron into different forms and making (metal) wheel tyres.

1762: Matthew Boulton opens the Soho Foundry engineering works, Handsworth; his partnership with Scottish engineer James Watt makes the steam engine into the power plant for the Industrial Revolution. The term "horsepower" is coined by Watt.

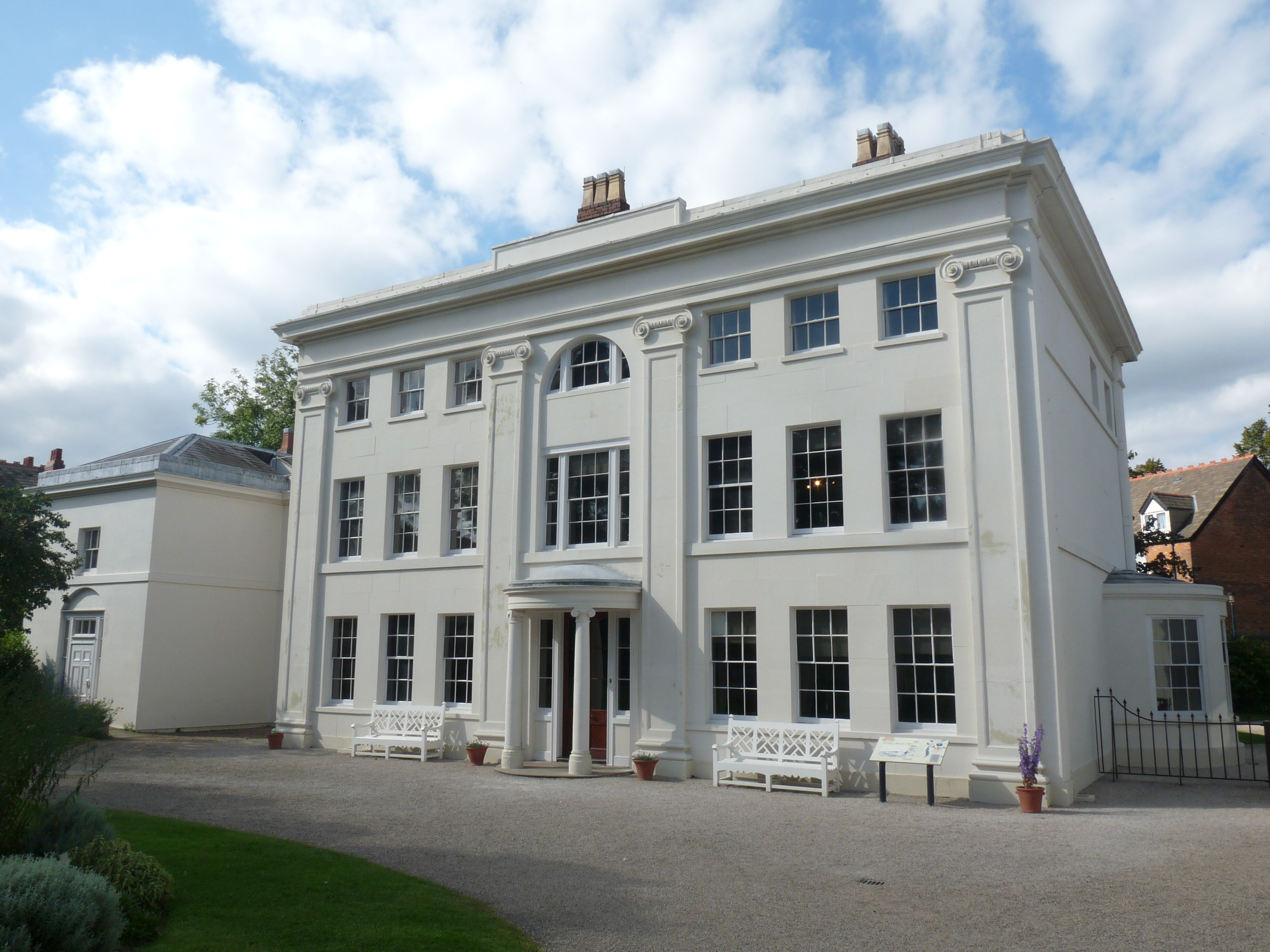
Soho House from the front. The house is now a museum free to patrons under 16.

1765: The Lunar Society begins life as a dinner club and informal learned society of prominent figures in the Midlands Enlightenment, including industrialists, natural philosophers and intellectuals, who meet regularly until 1813 in Birmingham. A paper read at the Science Museum in London in 1963 claims that "of all the provincial philosophical societies it was the most important, perhaps because it was not merely provincial. All the world came to Soho to meet Boulton, Watt or Small, who were acquainted with the leading men of Science throughout Europe and America." The Midlands Enlightenment dominates the experience of the Enlightenment within England and its leading thinkers have international influence. In particular, it forms a pivotal link between the earlier Scientific Revolution and the later Industrial Revolution, facilitating the exchange of ideas between experimental science, polite culture and practical technology that enables the technological preconditions for rapid economic growth to be attained.

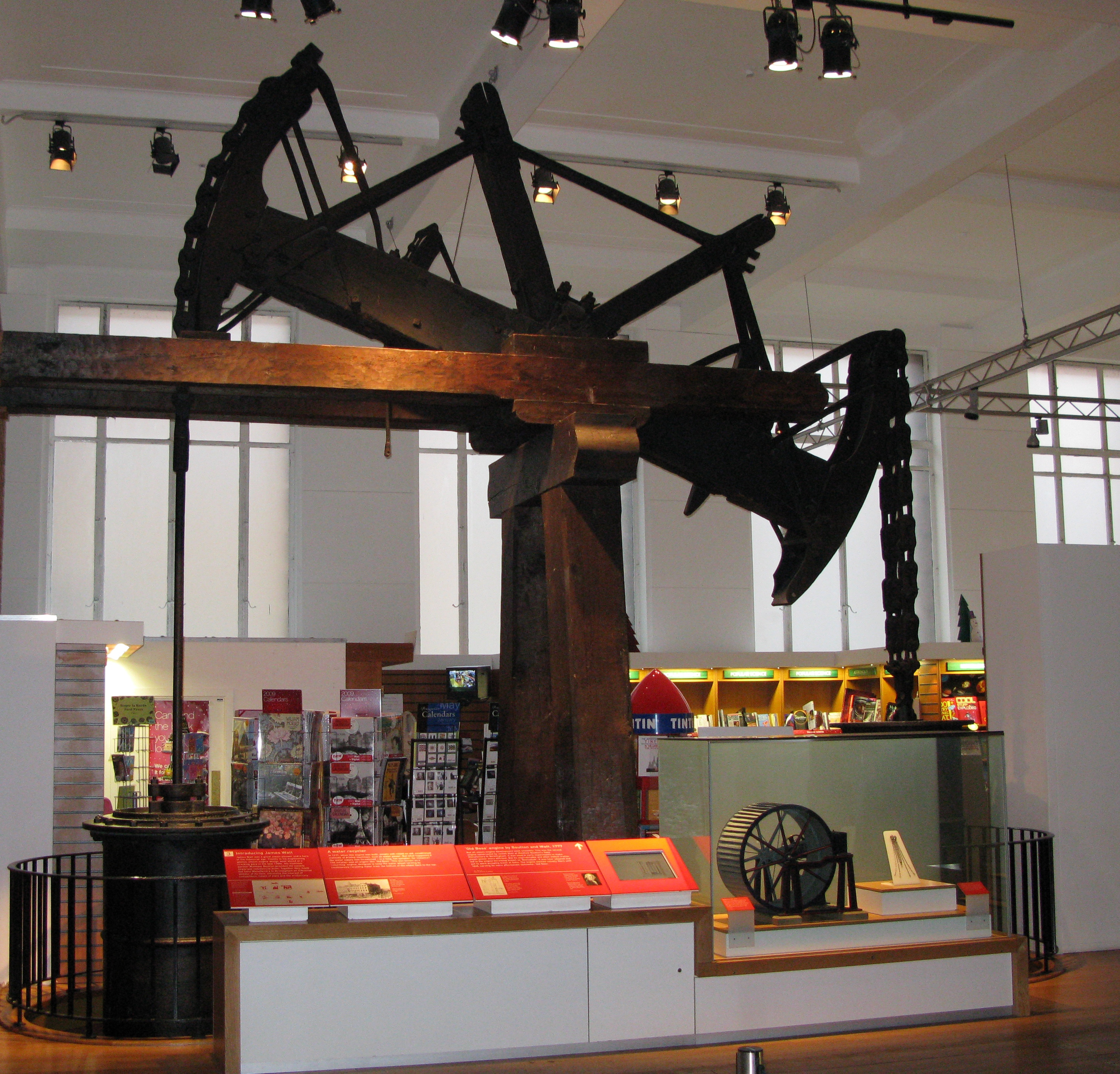
Old Bess, as now preserved in the Science Museum, London

1767: A number of prominent Birmingham businessmen, including Matthew Boulton and others from the Lunar Society, hold a public meeting in the White Swan, High Street, to consider the possibility of building a canal from Birmingham to the Staffordshire and Worcestershire Canal near Wolverhampton, taking in the coalfields of the Black Country. They commission the canal engineer James Brindley to propose a route. Brindley comes back with a largely level route via Smethwick, Oldbury, Tipton, Bilston and Wolverhampton to Aldersley. This kick-starts what is to become the Birmingham Canal Navigations.

1770: James Watt applies the first screw propeller to an early steam engine at his Birmingham works, thus beginning the use of a hydrodynamic screw for propulsion.

1772 Henry Clay patents a new method of making papier-mâché, capable of being "sawn, planed, dove-tailed or mitred in the same manner as if made in wood".

1775: Ketley's Building Society is founded and becomes the world's first building society. Midland Bank (now owned by HSBC) and Lloyds Bank are also founded in Birmingham.

1777: Boulton and Watt build 'Old Bess', as described by the London science museums 'an engine that stands at a crossroads in history'.

1779: James Keir takes out a patent for a compound metal that is capable of being forged when hot or cold more fit for the making of bolts, nails, and sheathing for ships prior to anything before. This metal uses the same compounds and similar quantities of metals as the patent of Muntz metal, which appears at the same time.

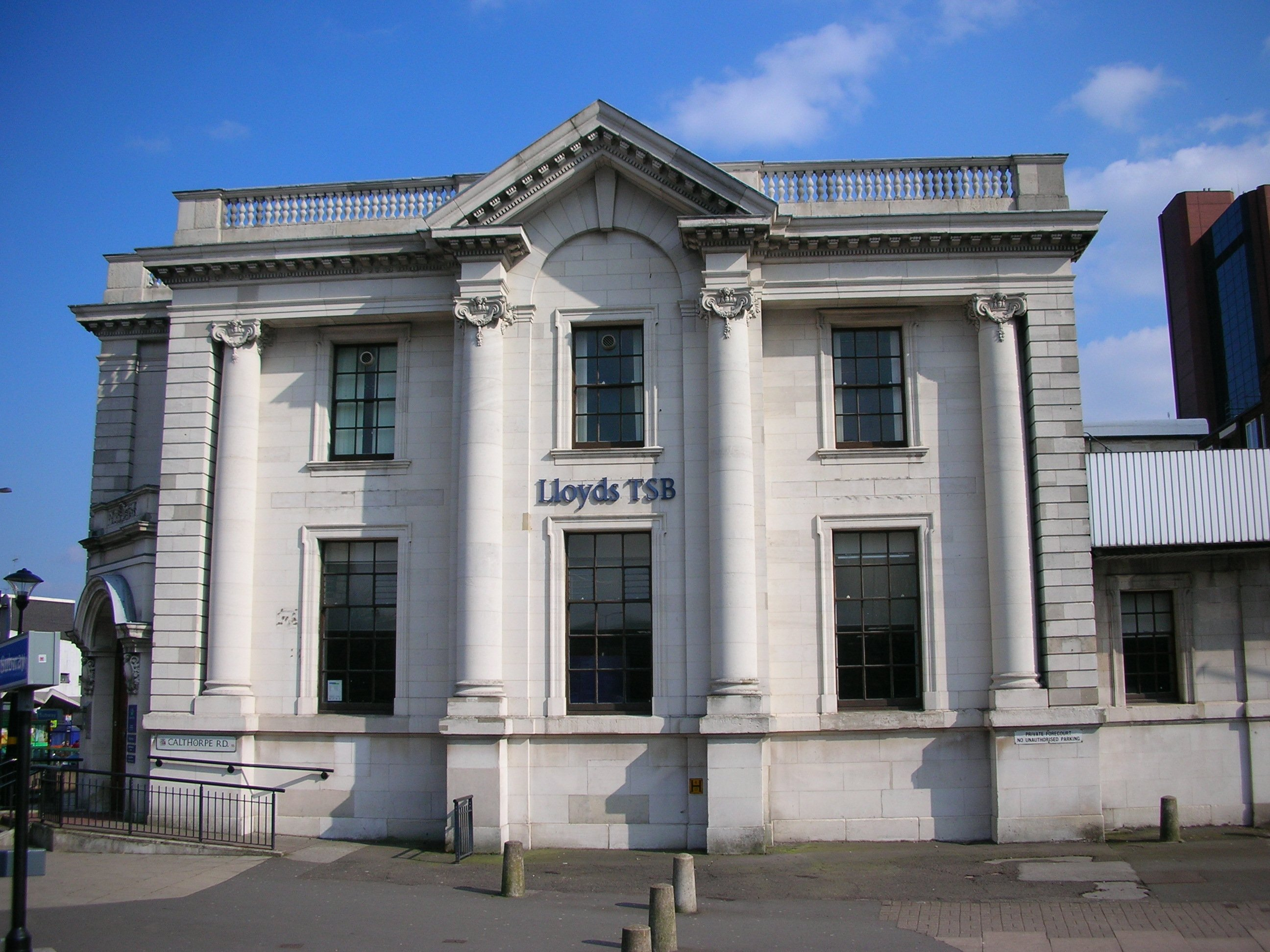
Birmingham became a town of commerce with two of the big four banks founded in the town. Lloyds bank was founded in 1765, the world's first building society Ketley's was founded in 1775, and Midland Bank (now owned by HSBC was founded in 1836). Pictured is the Edgbaston branch of Lloyds Bank, Five Ways, Birmingham

1779: Matthew Wasbrough designs and builds the Pickard Engine (first crank engine) for James Pickard of Snow Hill, this is defined as 'the first atmospheric engine in the world to directly achieve rotary motion by the use of a crank and flywheel.'

1779: James Watt patents a copying press or 'letter copying machine' to deal with the mass of paper work at his business; he also invents an ink to work with it. This is the first widely used copy machine for offices and is a commercial success, being used for over a century. This letter copying press is considered to be the original photocopier.

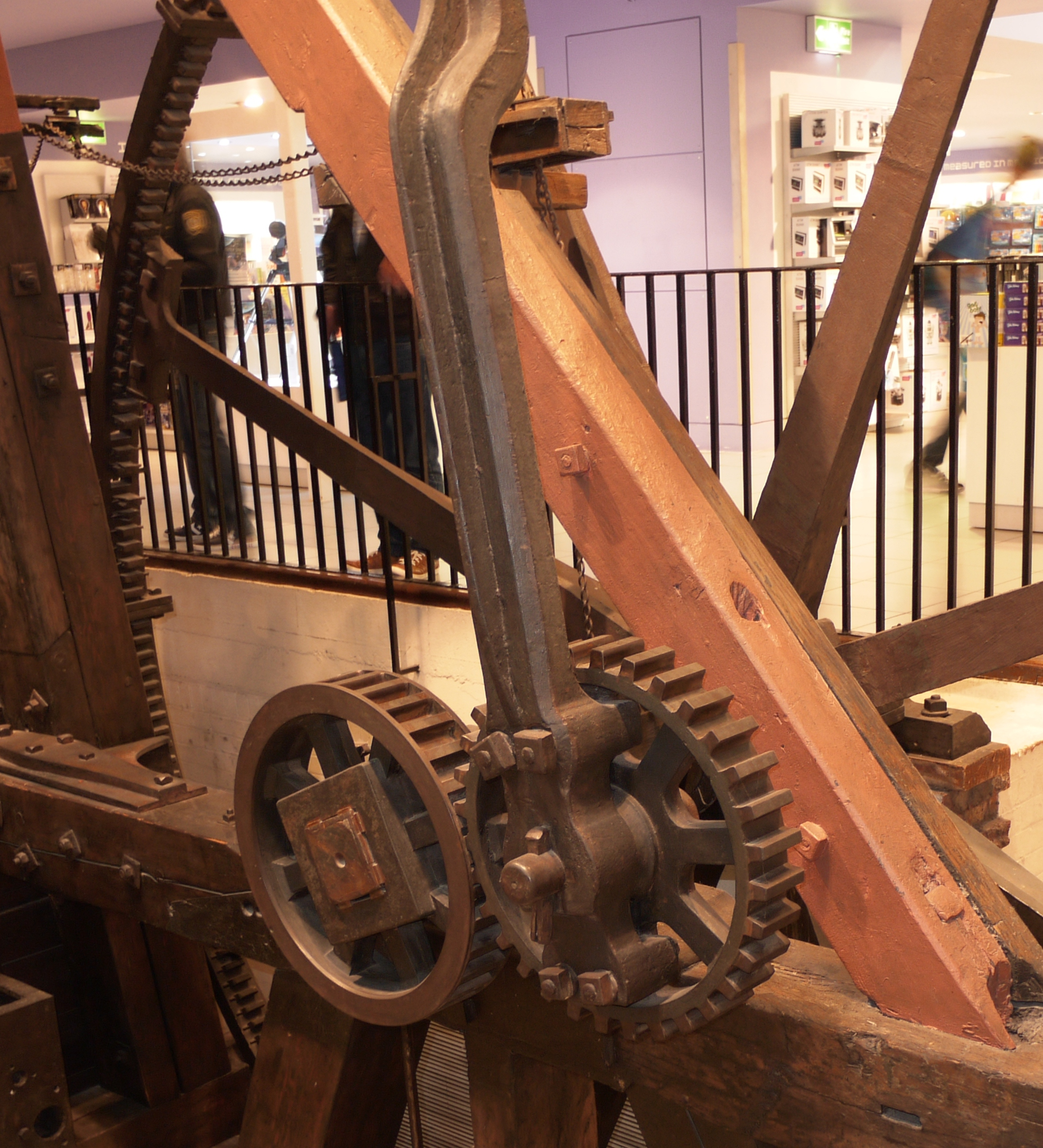
Boulton & Watt engine of 1788. The 'sun and planet gear' (also called the 'planet and sun gear') was a method of converting reciprocal motion to rotary motion and was utilised in a reciprocating steam engine

1781: James Watt markets his rotary-motion steam engine. The earlier steam engine's vertical movement was ideal for operating water pumps but the new engine can be adapted to drive all sorts of machinery. Richard Arkwright pioneers its use in his cotton mills and within 15 years there are 500+ Boulton & Watt steam engines in British factories and mines. Boulton also arranges, in 1775, an act of Parliament extending the term of Watt's 1769 patent to 1799.

1784: James Watt refers to a two-speed transmission in patent No. 1432, which relates to steam carriages: The concept of changing speed (or a variable velocity) in gearing, which could arguably be the seed of thought for all subsequent gearing systems.

"Motion [from a steam engine] is communicated to the axle-tree of one or more wheels of the carriage by means of the "circulating rotative to machinery" formerly patented by the inventor. Two or more loose wheels of different diameters are placed to be locked on the axle and impart extra power for bad roads or steep ascents."

1785: William Withering publishes An Account of the Foxglove and some of its Medical Uses, pioneering its use as a cardiac drug, Digitalis.

1785: James Watt and William Murdoch invent the oscillating cylinder and double action engine. Around this time James Watt creates a governor and throttle valve for automatically regulating the supply of steam to an engine although no patents for this are taken out by Watt.

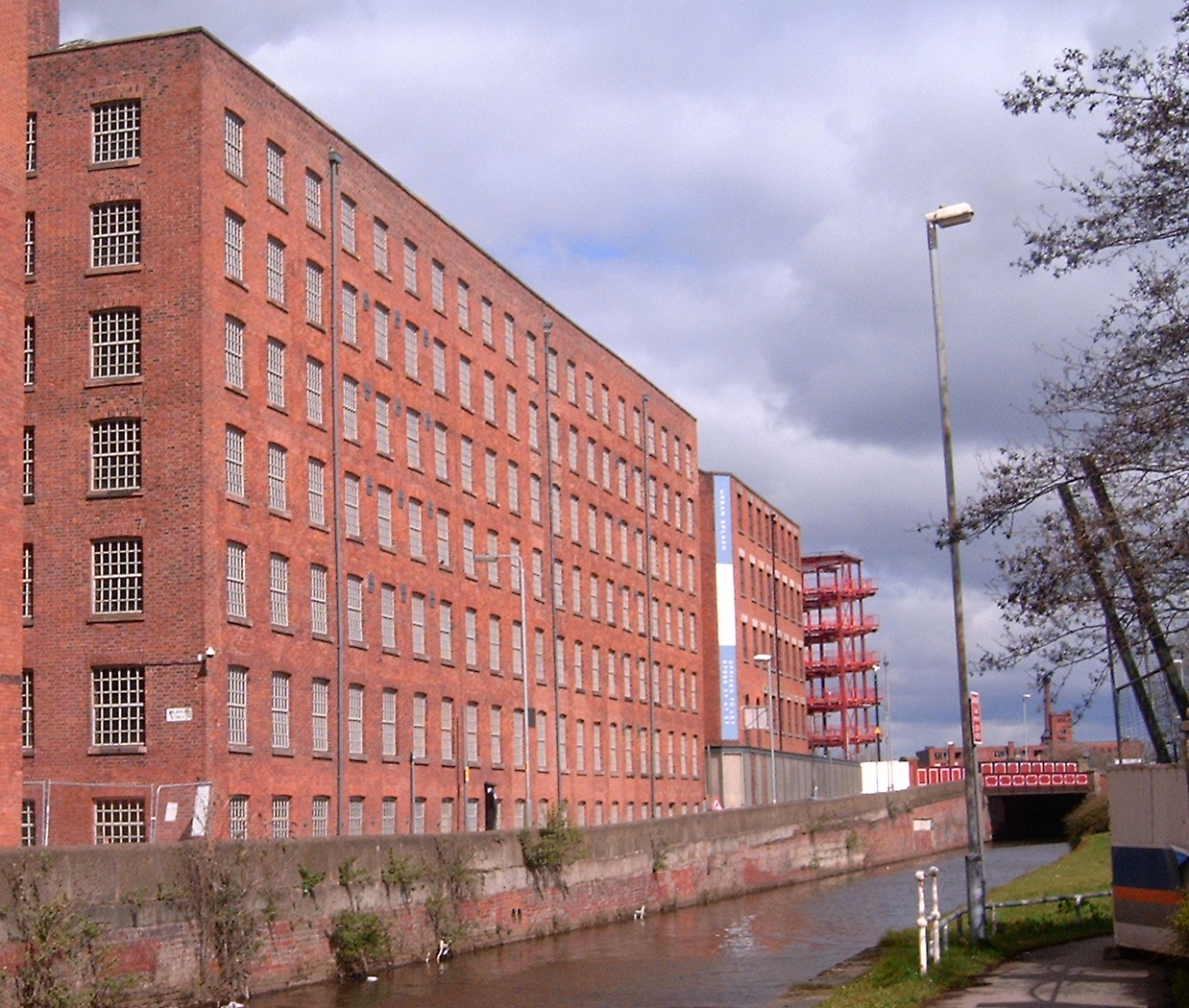
The first steam powered Cotton Mills such as this Murrays' Mill in Greater Manchester were powered by 40 hp Boulton and Watt beam engines. Richard Arkwright pioneered Watt's rotary-motion steam engine in his cotton mills and within 15 years there were 500+ Boulton & Watt steam engines in British factories and mines.

1788: Boulton and Watt build the rotative steam engine also known as a piston engine, an improved steam engine whose smooth reciprocating action enable it to drive a variety of rotary machinery.

1790: W. Richardson publishes The Chemical Principles of the Metallic Arts: designed chiefly for the use of Manufacturers, which is used to help with diseases associated with the metal working industry.

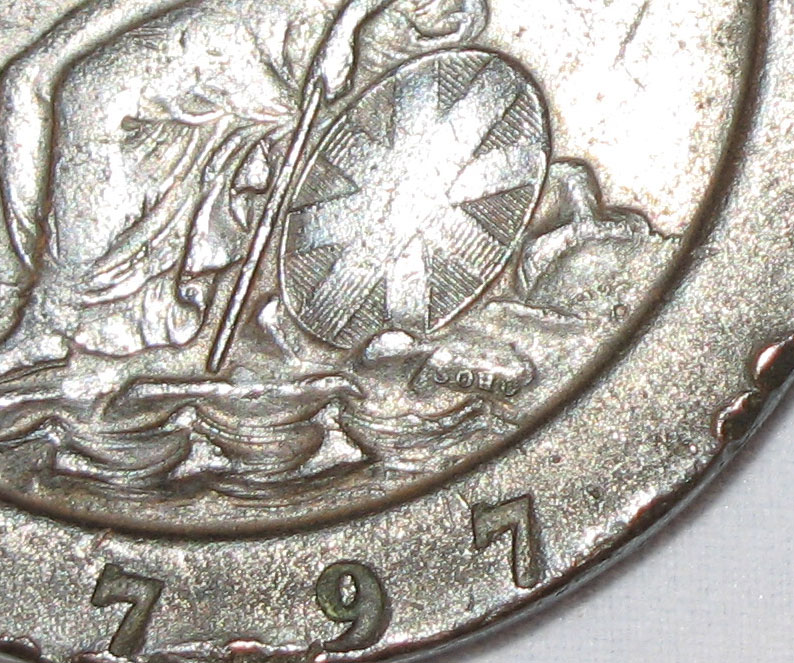
Soho mint mark on a cartwheel twopence. The Soho Mint pioneered mass production methods of coin manufacture around the world, with eight machines, driven by a steam engine, each capable of striking 70 to 84 coins per minute and worked by children.

1794: Ralph Heaton patents a steam powered machine for mass-producing button shanks. This is one of the earliest forms of mechanical mass production and steam powered machine tool operation.

Around this time William Futrell (a well known Birmingham pugilist) becomes publisher of possibly the first British boxing paper.

1797: Matthew Boulton erects at Soho a complete coining plant with which he strikes coins for the Sierra Leone and East India companies and for Russia, and produces a new copper coinage for Britain. Also in 1797, he takes out a British patent in connection with raising water on the principle of the hydraulic ram although one of a similar nature appears in France at around the same time.

1799: The first bellcrank engine is patented by William Murdoch while working for Boulton and Watt. It is the first compact, self-contained engine.

Among the products Matthew Boulton seeks to make in his new facility are sterling silver plate for those able to afford it, and Sheffield plate, silver-plated copper, for those less well off. Boulton and his father make small silver items throughout the 18th century, and there is no record of large items in either silver or Sheffield plate being made in Birmingham before Boulton does so. To make items such as candlesticks more cheaply than the London competition, the firm makes many items out of thin, die-stamped sections, which are shaped and joined.

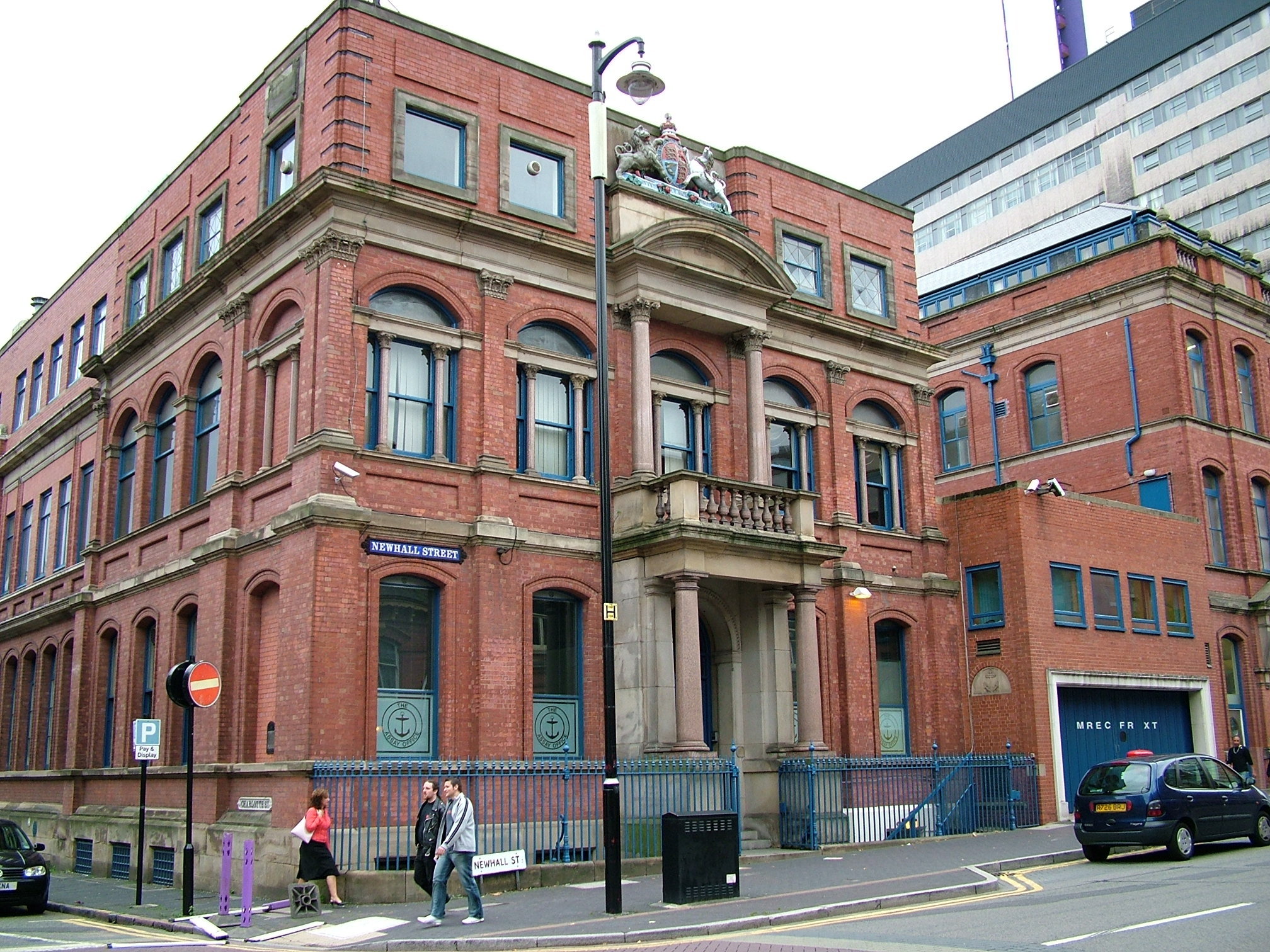
Birmingham Assay Office was fought for by Boulton and it changed the fortunes of silver making in the town and can still be visited today.

One impediment to Boulton's work is the lack of an assay office in Birmingham. The silver toys long made by the family firm are generally too light to require assaying, but silver plate has to be sent over 70 miles (110 km) to the nearest assay office, at Chester, to be assayed and hallmarked, with the attendant risks of damage and loss. Alternatively they can be sent to London, but this exposes them to the risk of being copied by competitors.

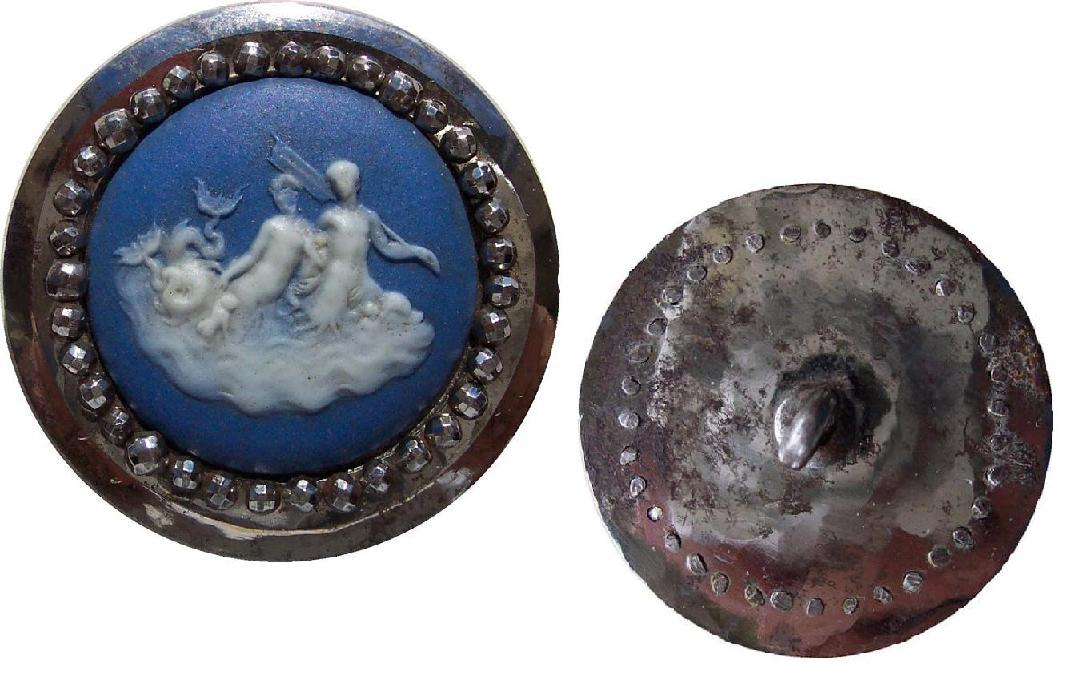
Wedgwood button with Boulton cut steels, depicting a mermaid and family, England, circa 1760.

Boulton writes in 1771:

"I am very desirous of becoming a great silversmith, yet I am determined not to take up that branch in the large way I intended, unless powers can be obtained to have a marking hall [assay office] at Birmingham."

Boulton petitions Parliament for the establishment of an assay office in Birmingham. Though the petition is bitterly opposed by London goldsmiths, he is successful in getting Parliament to pass an act of Parliament establishing assay offices in Birmingham and Sheffield, whose silversmiths face similar difficulties in transporting their wares. The act is passed in March 1773, to grant Birmingham and Sheffield the right to assay silver.

1773: The Birmingham Assay Office opens on 31 August and the town becomes a leading manufacturer of all types of silver ware spanning three centuries. The assay office can still be visited today by appointment and is situated near to the city's well renowned Jewellery Quarter.

1793: "A gentleman of the name of Hand" in Birmingham obtains a patent for preparing flexible leather having a glaze and polish that renders it impervious to water and needing only be wiped with a sponge to restore it to its original lustre. This is later recognised as patent leather and is further improved by other inventors.

At some time around the late 18th or early 19th century a stand-alone cooking range or stove is invented by John Heard (joiner), capable of roasting, boiling, baking and of course heating a room. The products of combustion are carried off by means of a flue leading to the chimney, the inventor mentions it is particularly suitable for use on board ships. This is possibly the first of its kind, as earlier stoves such as the Franklin stove do not appear to have flues attached and require a hearth and chimney to function, also it is not until the turn of the 19th century that other stoves begin appearing for cooking as well as heating a room.

== 19th century ==
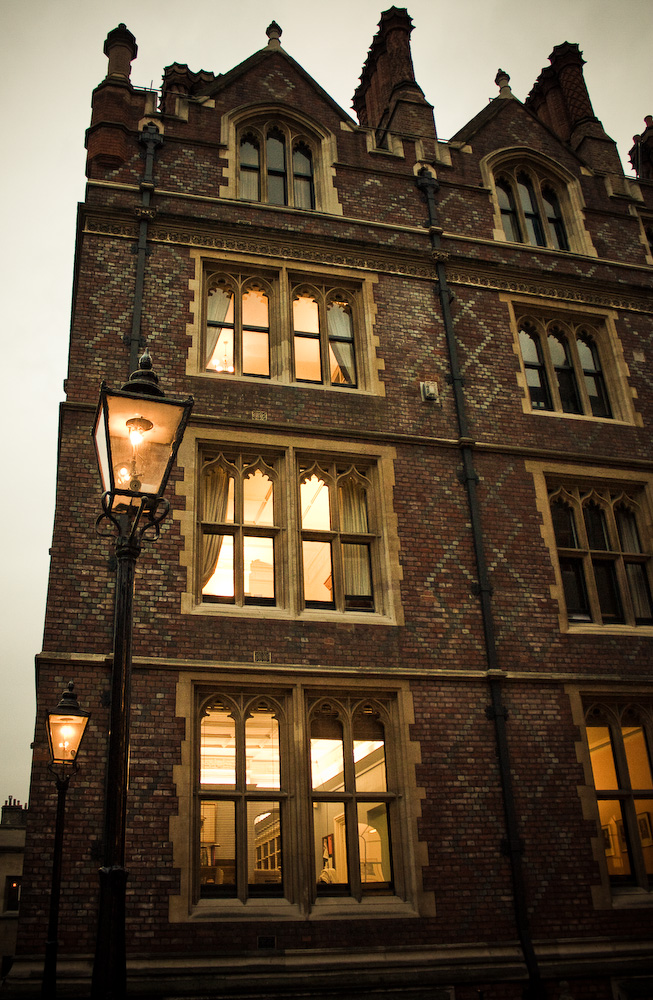
Gas lighting was pioneered in Birmingham, and subsequently spread around the world. Gas lamps were later replaced with electric fittings.

1802: The exterior of the Soho Foundry is lit with gas lighting by William Murdoch. Murdoch, its developer, worked for Matthew Boulton and James Watt at Soho. This becomes the basis for Birmingham's immense gas industry, which incorporates many products and trades that rely on gas to work.

1811: Henry James takes out a patent for propelling vessels by steam, via a paddle wheel fixed in the middle of the stern and steered by two fins to relieve leggers from the arduous duty of pushing boats through canal tunnels.

1814: Thomas Dobbs (actor) invents a reaping machine, which consists of a circular saw or sickle; the grain is drawn or fed up to the saw by means of a pair of rollers. This predates William Bell's straw cutting machine.

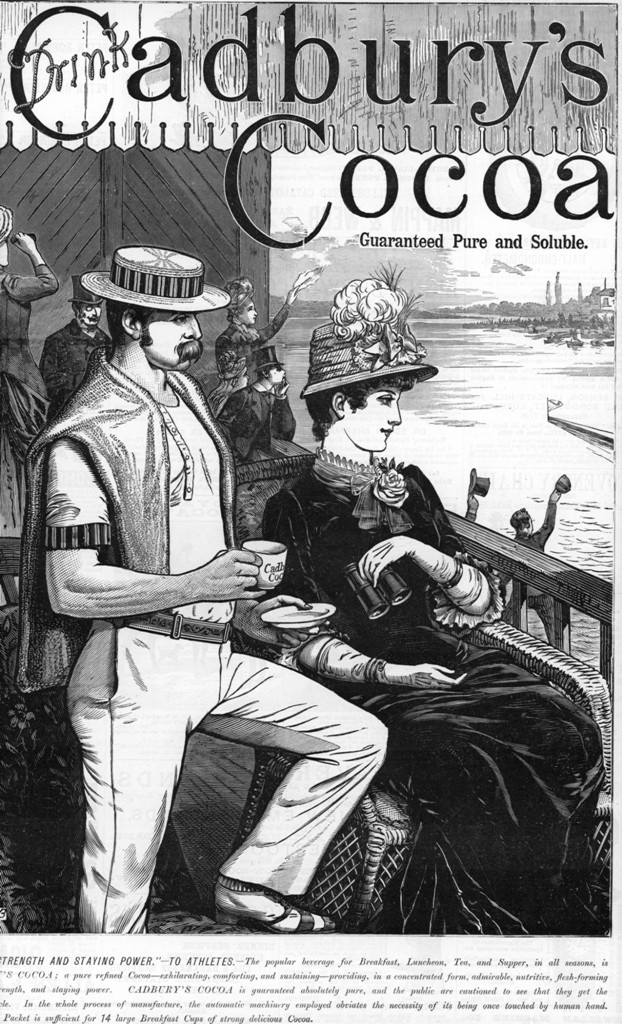
Cadbury's was founded in Birmingham and later became a household name in Britain, selling cocoa based foods and drink and pioneering mass food manufacture techniques as well as major advances in the well-being of employees by providing homes and encouraging fitness through sport.

1821: Emanuel Heaton, gun finisher, takes out a patent for a watertight pan for gun locks.

1823: Francis Deakin improves a method of stringing the piano by employing the screw and nut as opposed to the previously used wooden peg, thus allowing a greater tension and strength of wire.

1824: American inventor William Church patents a printing machine in his Birmingham works, which positions the paper sheets more accurately. He is a prolific inventor, taking out numerous patents for methods of button making, nail making, metal working, smelting iron, spinning and other branches of engineering.

1824: John Cadbury begins selling tea, coffee, and drinking chocolate, which he produces himself, at Bull Street. He later moves into the production of a variety of cocoa and drinking chocolates, made in a factory in Bridge Street and sold mainly to the wealthy because of the high cost of production. John Cadbury becomes a partner with his brother Benjamin and the company they form is called 'Cadbury Brothers of Birmingham'.

The brothers open an office in London and in 1854 they receive the royal warrant as manufacturers of chocolate and cocoa to Queen Victoria. In the 1850s the industry receives a much needed boost, with the reduction in the high import taxes on cocoa, allowing chocolate to be more affordable to everybody. Cadbury's later becomes one of the largest chocolate manufacturers in the world and is still in production across the world today with a major production plant in Bournville.

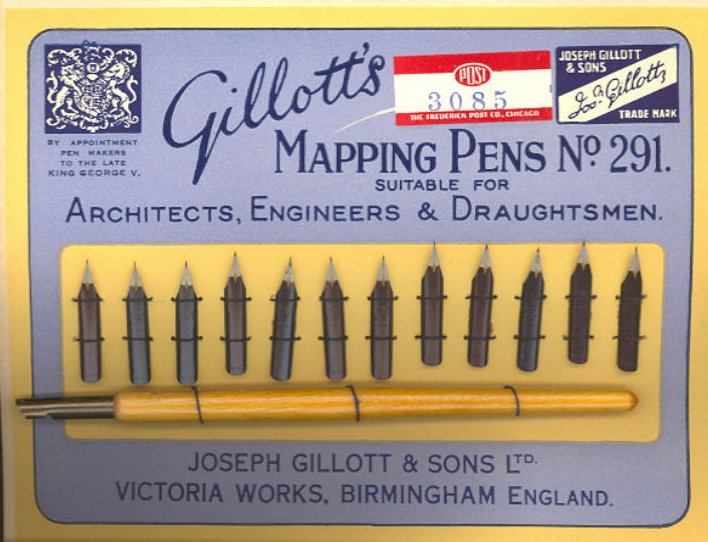
By the 1850s, Birmingham Pen Trade existed as a world centre for steel pen and steel nib manufacture; more than half the steel-nib pens manufactured in the world at this time were made in Birmingham.

1828: Josiah Mason improves a cheap, efficient slip-in nib that can be added to a fountain pen.

1830: With the invention of a new machine, William Joseph Gillott, John Mitchell and James Stephen Perry devise a way to mass-produce robust, cheap steel pen nibs. This boosts the Birmingham pen trade and by the 1850s, Birmingham exists as a world centre for steel pen and steel nib manufacture; more than half the steel-nib pens manufactured in the world are made in Birmingham. Thousands of skilled craftsmen and -women are employed in the industry. Many new manufacturing techniques are perfected, enabling the city's factories to mass-produce their pens cheaply and efficiently. These are sold worldwide to many who previously cannot afford to write, thus encouraging the development of education and literacy.

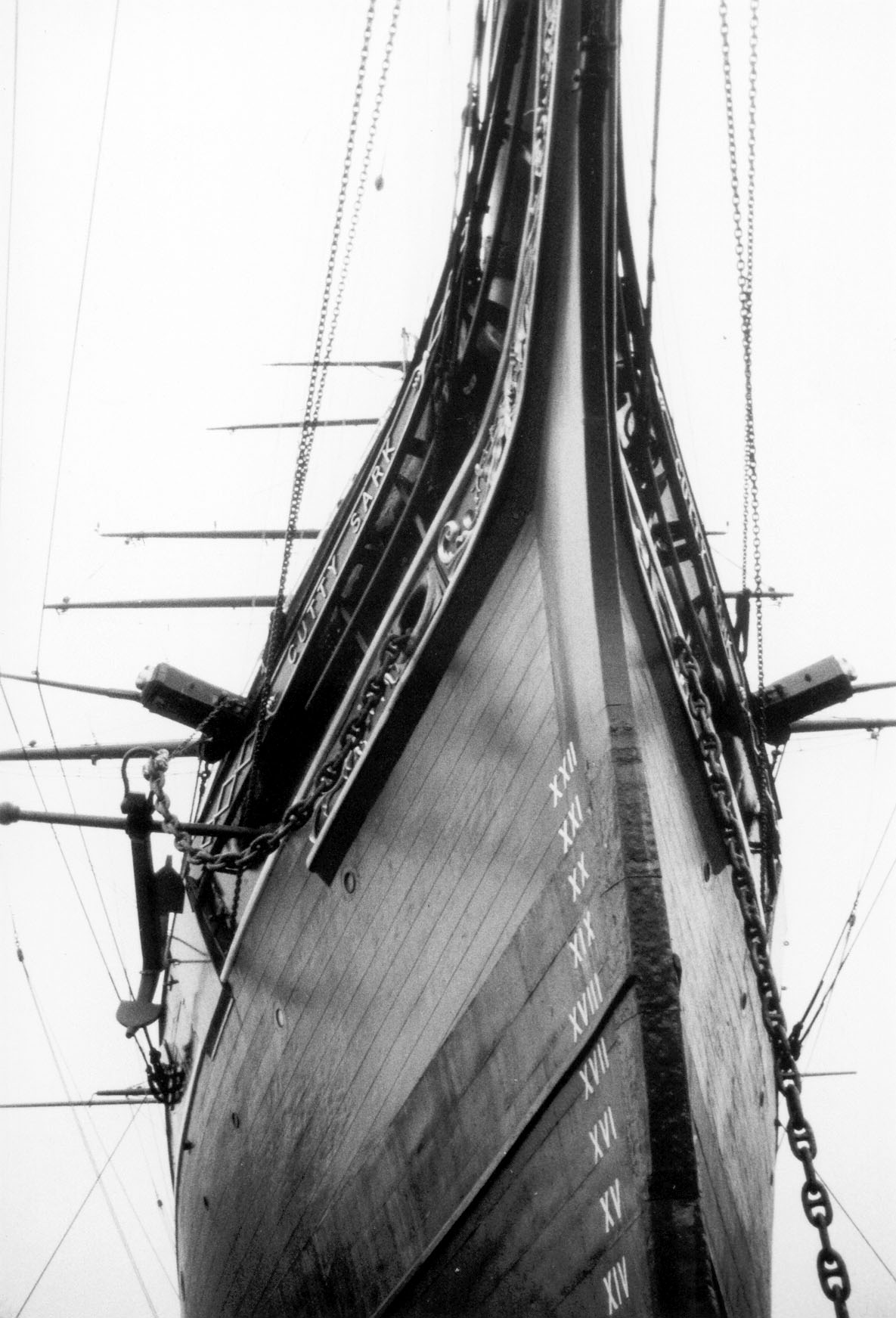
Muntz metal was used in maritime vessels such as the hull of the Cutty Sark, Its original application was as a replacement for copper sheathing placed on the bottom of boats and is still used today for corrosion resistant machine parts.

1830s: Thomas Ridgway begins trading in the Bull Ring, selling tea. Ridgway later goes bankrupt. Setting up business in London, he pays back all of his creditors and continues his tea trade, becoming one of the first English tea companies to hygienically prepack tea so as to avoid adulteration. In 1876, Queen Victoria commands House of Ridgways to create a blend for her own personal use.

1832: Muntz metal is patented, an alpha-beta brass with about 40% zinc and 60% copper. Its original use is as a replacement for the copper lining placed on the bottom of boats as it maintains the anti-fouling abilities of the pure form.

It costs around two-thirds that of pure copper and has identical properties for this application, it becomes the material of choice and Muntz makes his fortune. A notable use of Muntz Metal is in the hull of the Cutty Sark.

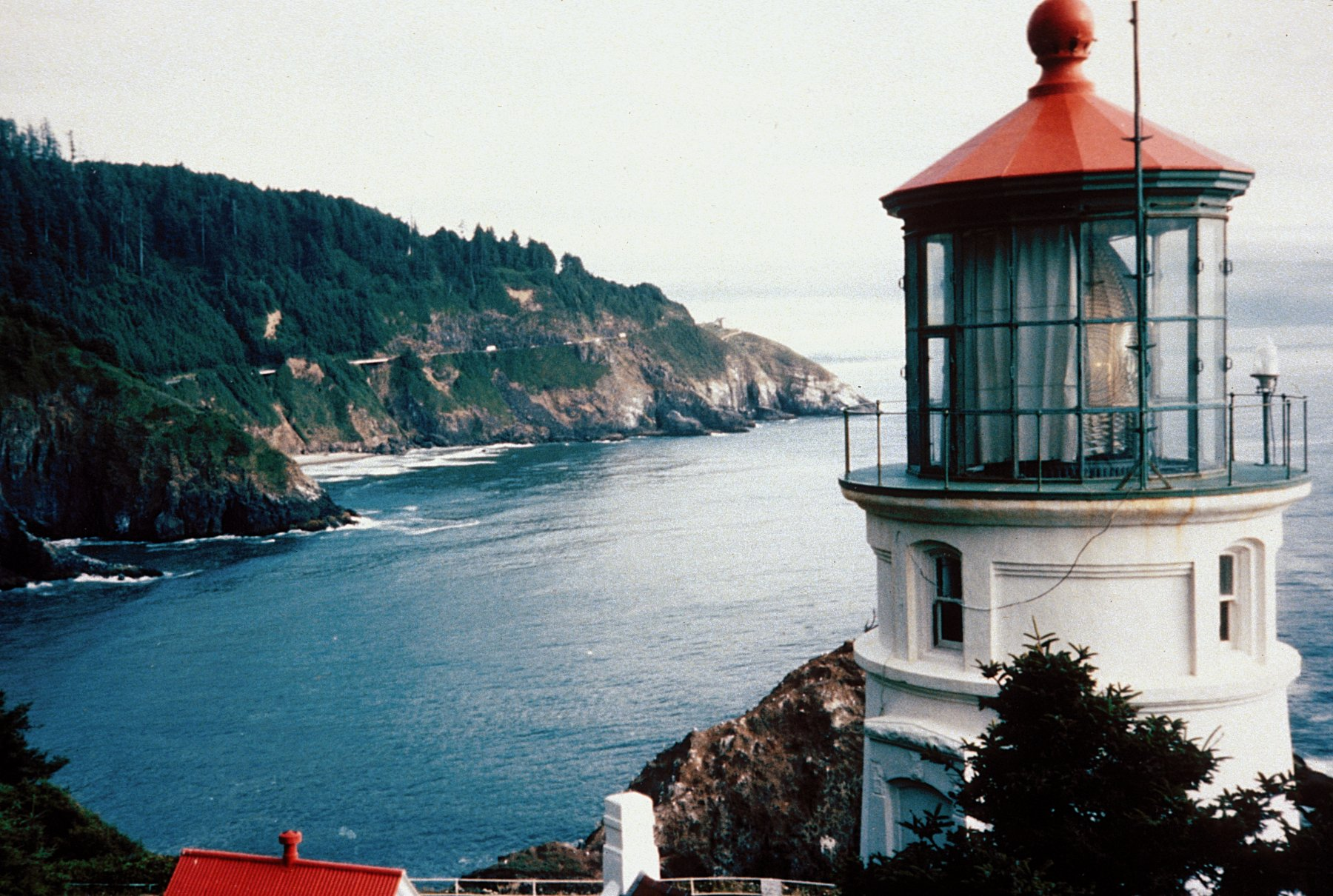
Heceta Head Lighthouse in Oregon. The Chance Brothers Fresnel lens, built in the early 1890s, is still in operation at this historic light station. Chances became one of the foremost glass makers in the world, pioneering the use of glass in items such as UV lenses and glass syringes. Another famous lighthouse Split Point Lighthouse in Australia uses a Birmingham-made Fresnel lens but the factory was bombed during war-time and the essential formulae for making the unique lens crystal were lost

1832: William Chance, owner of a Birmingham iron merchants, invests in his brothers failing glass works in nearby Smethwick. After saving the company, this partnership later becomes the Chance Brothers. The company relies on local workers, and at one stage is known as "... the greatest glass manufacturer in Britain", taking advantage of the Birmingham Canal Navigations and the Industrial Revolution in the region. Great advances in glass manufacture take place such as perfection of the earliest optical lenses to block the harmful ultraviolet rays of the sun and improvements in lighthouse illumination. The company is responsible for glazing the original Crystal Palace to house the Great Exhibition of 1851, and the Houses of Parliament (built 1840–1860). At that time it is the only firm that is able to make the opal glass for the four faces of the Westminster Clock Tower that houses the famous bell, Big Ben. The ornamental windows for the White House in America are also made at Chances.

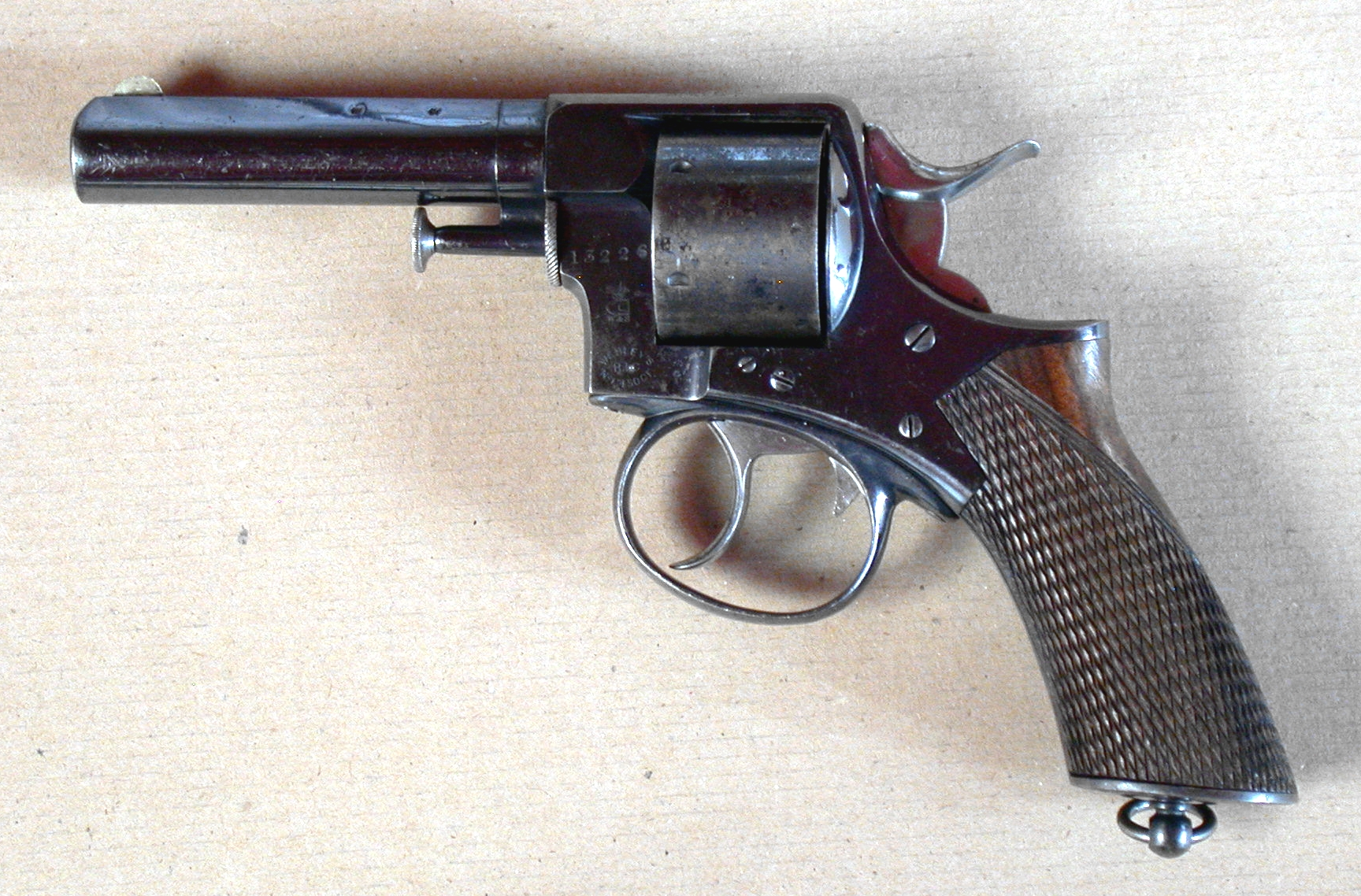
An 1868 Webley & Scott Revolver. Birmingham has a long history of arms manufacture. By the 19th century, the introduction of the percussion system combined with the adoption of modern production methods led to Birmingham becoming the dominant producer in British firearms with its own Gun Quarter.

1832: A form of German silver is invented by Charles Askins, this is used to make spoons and cutlery specifically in the Birmingham area.

1837: Bird's Custard is first formulated and cooked by Alfred Bird, because his wife is allergic to eggs, the key ingredient used to thicken traditional custard. Bird's custard powder later becomes famous around the world.

1838: Charles Green patents an original and unique method of producing solid, seamless brass and copper tubes, around this time much development takes place in Birmingham and Manchester with regard to copper tubing and printing plates.

1839: After many years of research, innovation and campaigning, Rowland Hill (of Kidderminster and later Birmingham) is given a two-year contract to run his new postal system. Hill is an English teacher, inventor and social reformer. He campaigns for a comprehensive reform of the postal system, based on the concept of penny postage and his solution of prepayment facilitates the safe, speedy and cheap transfer of letters. Hill later serves as a government postal official, and he is usually credited with originating the basic concepts of the modern postal service, including the invention of the postage stamp (his brother Edwin Hill helps the service with further innovations).

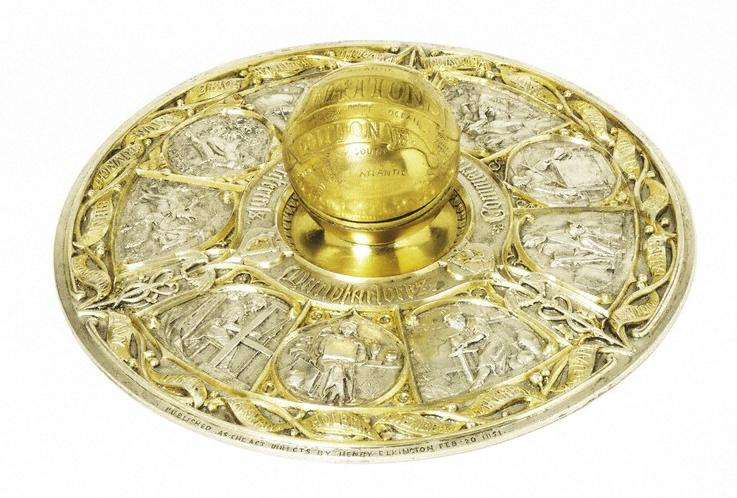
George and Henry Elkington were awarded the first patents for electroplating in 1840. These two then founded the electroplating industry in Birmingham from where it spread around the world.

1839: Sir Edward Thomason improves the gun lock by making the cock detachable by the thumb and finger as well as making improvements to prevent misfires.

George Elkington and Henry Elkington found the English electroplating industry in the early 19th century. In 1840, they aid John Wright, who discovers that potassium cyanide is a suitable electrolyte for gold and silver electroplating.

Carl Wilhelm Siemens has several meetings with George Elkington, and makes speeches on 'Science and Industry,' to the Birmingham and Midland Institute, he later sets up a works in Birmingham and carries out experiments on metals and telegraphy.

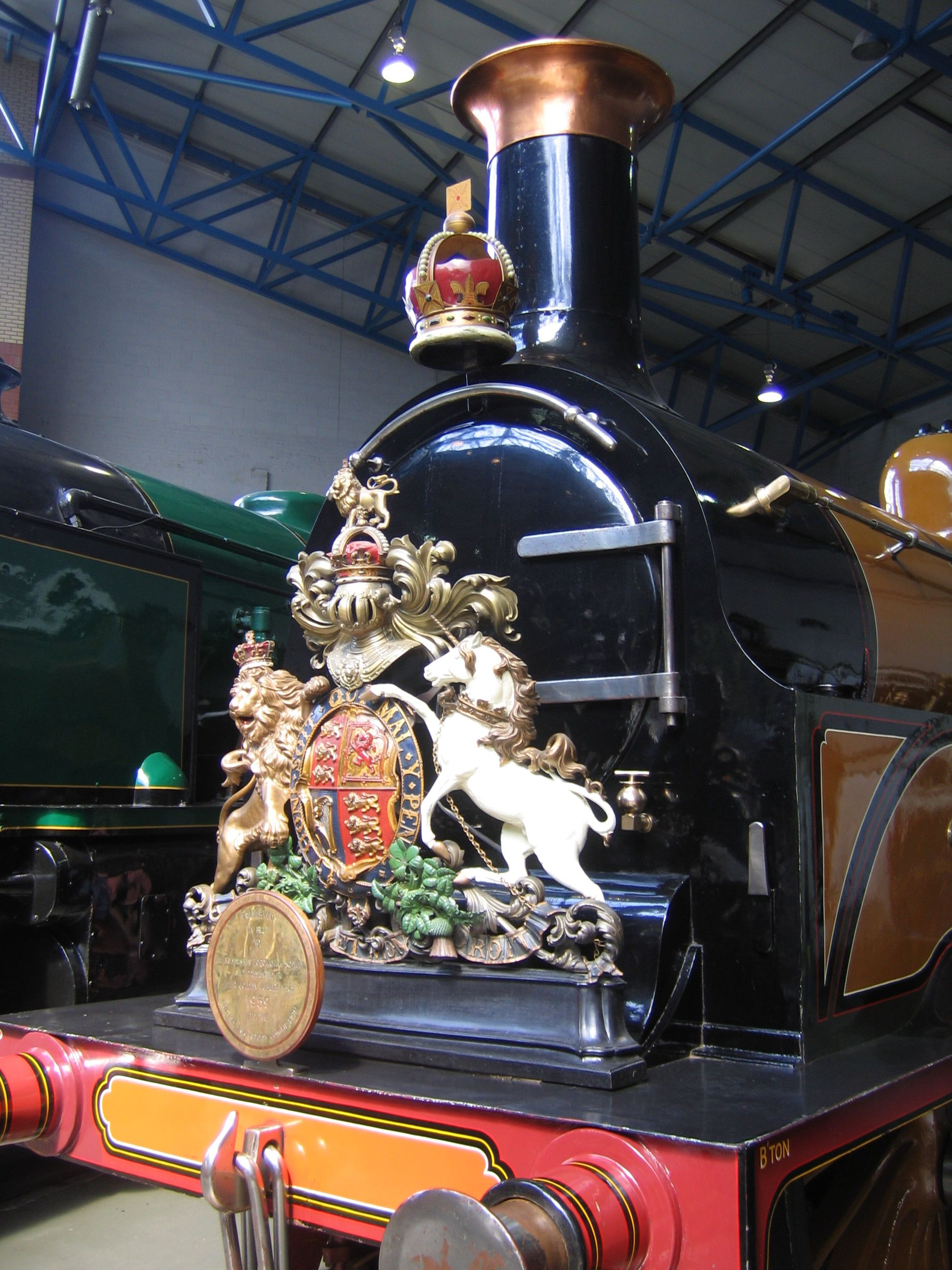
One of William Stroudley's locomotives. Stroudley spent seven years studying in Birmingham under John Inshaw before becoming one of Britain's most famous steam locomotive engineers.

1845: During the late 1830s, canal steam boats begin operating with limited success but in 1845, Birmingham engineer John Inshaw builds the first twin-screw canal steamers. Inshaw finds great success through his engineering and in 1859 the owners of the Ashby Canal ban his steamer "Pioneer", claiming it erodes the canal banks. It is later allowed to run no faster than 4 mph, thus begin speed limits on British waterways. Inshaw's "Pioneer" is successful and later inspires other steam boats such as those built for the Grand Junction Canal. Inshaw is also consulted by George Stephenson on the design of wheels for steam locomotives.

Sir Francis Galton created some of the first weather maps in order to devise a theory on storm systems. These proved popular with the British public when first printed in newspapers.

1847: William Stroudley joins Birmingham engineer John Inshaw as one of his most successful pupils. Stroudley later becomes one of Britain's most famous steam locomotive engineers of the 19th century, working principally for the London, Brighton and South Coast Railway (LB&SCR). He designs some of the most famous and longest-lived steam locomotives of his era.

Birmingham glassworks are among the early mass-producers of uranium glass. Manufacturers include Bacchus, Green & Green (later George Bacchus & Sons), Union Glassworks, in the 1840s, and Lloyd & Summerfield in the 1850s, who are the first to use uranium in glass commercially.

1849: William Tranter takes out the first of many patents for his improvements in manufacture of the firearm.

The use of weather charts in a modern sense begins in the middle portion of the 19th century. Weather map pioneers include William Charles Redfield, William Reid, Elias Loomis, and Birmingham's Sir Francis Galton, who creates the first weather maps in order to devise a theory on storm systems.

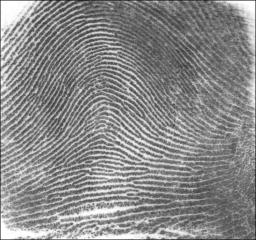
Sir Francis Galton studied fingerprints for ten years, publishing a detailed statistical model of fingerprint analysis and identification and encouraged its use in forensic science.

Galton formulates (and later coins the term for) eugenics as well as questionnaires and many important tools in statistics. Galton avidly supports the theories of his cousin Charles Darwin, and also furthers the most important advances in fingerprinting.

1851: John Nettlefold, screw manufacturer, attends the Paris exhibition. He later buys exclusive rights to use Thomas Sloan's machine for making screws, which is in the show. With adaptation of the machine for their Birmingham premises and inspiration of Birmingham mass production methods, Nettlefold & Chamberlain become Britain's leading screw-making firm.

1854: Birmingham chemist Thomas Allcock invents the porous plaster for the relief of pain in New York after fighting as a General for the New York Heavy Artillery during the American Civil War after emigrating in 1845 aged 20.

1857: Joseph Sturge buys the Elberton Sugar Estate and converts it into a lime production plant. The Montserrat Co. Ltd. is formed in Edgbaston by J.& E. Sturge. Lime juice is produced in the city and then exported for use in the manufacture of citric acid. The failure of Sicily's lemon crop at this time results in an opening in the market, which Sturge takes great advantage of utilizing their extensive chemical works based in Edgbaston. He also tries to prove that Free labour can be made profitable (the Sturge family are instrumental in the anti-slavery movement). A company is set up by the Sturge and Albright families who fund the development of Montserrat estates in 1867.

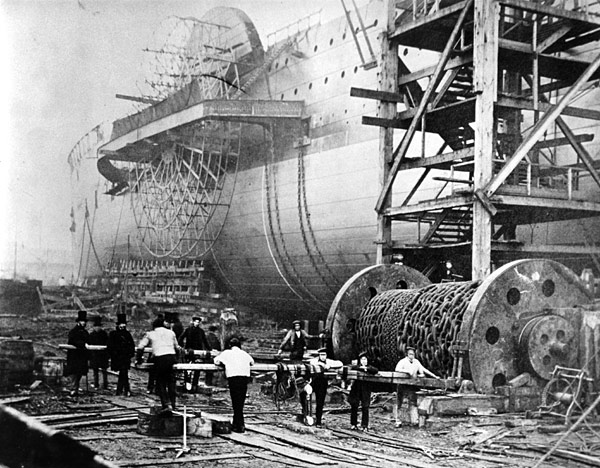
Isambard Kingdom Brunel turned to Richard Tangye to help launch the SS Great Eastern in 1858. Tangye later designed, built and exported all types of engines, jacks and pulleys across the world.

1858: After several failed attempts of launching the SS Great Eastern steam ship, Isambard Kingdom Brunel turns to Richard Tangye's more powerful hydraulic rams, which are successfully employed in the launch.

Richard Tangye's company then acquires the patent of the differential pulley-block in 1859, and in 1862 he invents the Tangye Patent hydraulic jack. This results in the 1862 purchase and demolition of Soho-located Smethwick Hall, on the site of which is built the Cornwall Works.

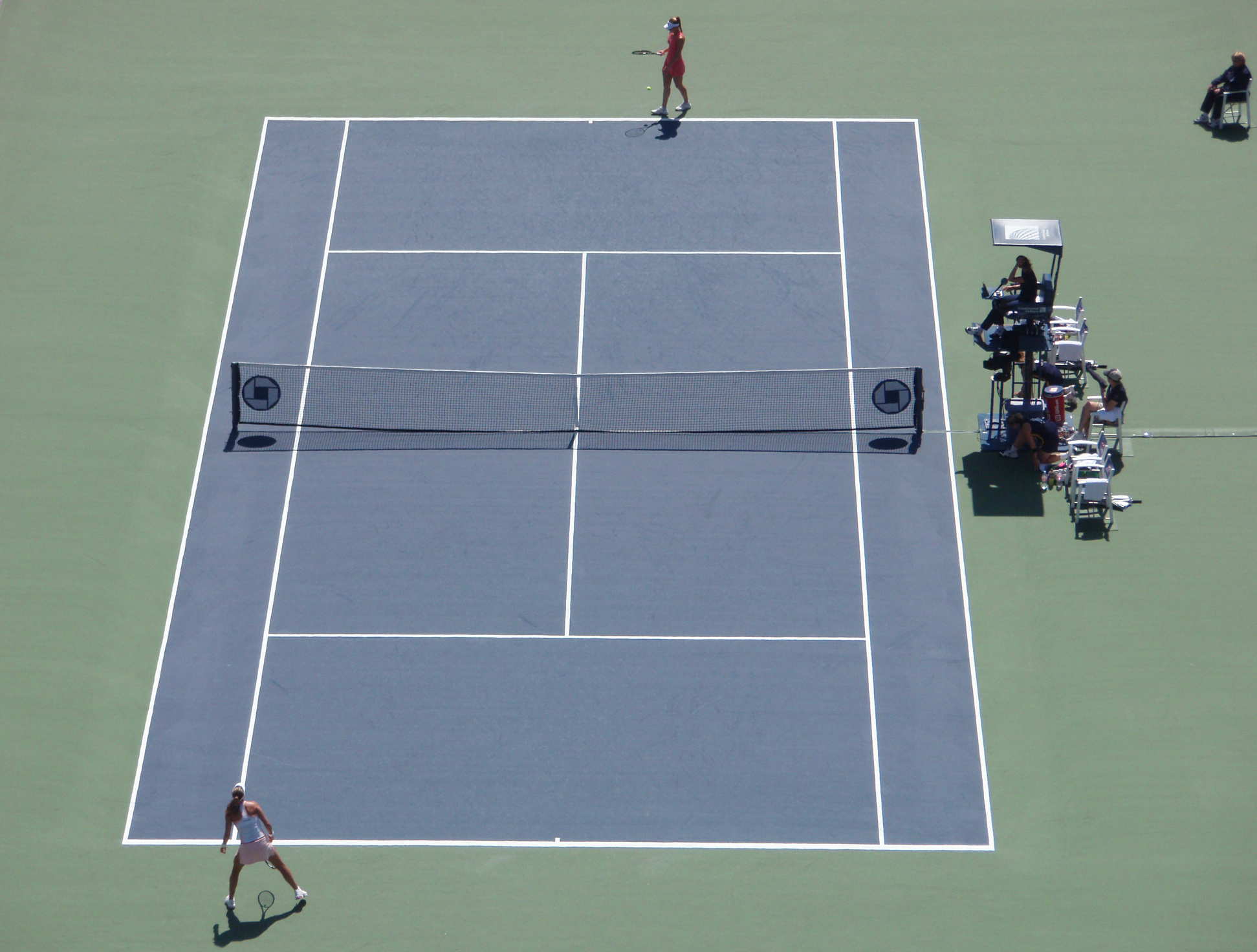
The modern game of lawn tennis was invented in Edgbaston by Augurio Perera and Harry Gem.

1867: The patent for a new type of direct-acting steam pump is acquired, in 1869 Tangye Ltd is commissioned to design the hydraulic systems for the UK's first funicular cliff railway in Scarborough, North Yorkshire and in 1870 the company commences the manufacture of steam engines. Richard Tangye and his brother George found the Birmingham Art Gallery in 1885, which today has a collection of international importance covering fine art, ceramics, metalwork, jewellery, archaeology, ethnography, local history and industrial history. They also found the Birmingham School of Art.

1859: The first ever game of lawn tennis is played in Edgbaston, international tennis is still played at Edgbaston's Priory Club.

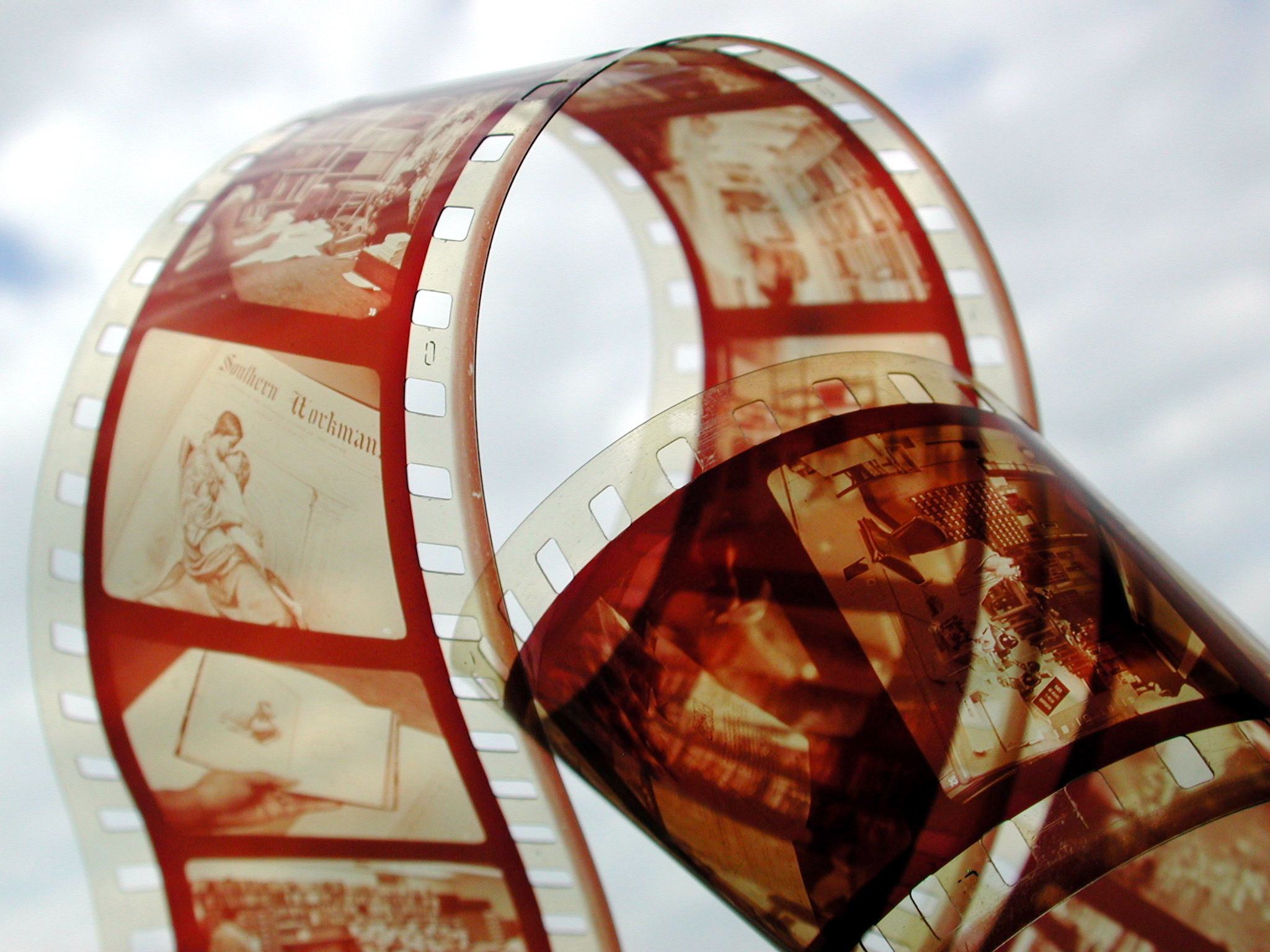
Celluloid as a bulk material for forming objects was invented in 1856 by Alexander Parkes, it was later described as generally the first plastic and is used in various subsequent inventions, most notably movie film.

The first celluloid as a bulk material for forming objects is invented in 1856 by Alexander Parkes. Many years later, and with the recognition of celluloid as a format for making photographic film, an American court declares Parkes as the true inventor of celluloid.

1862: the thermoplastic Parkesine is showcased at the Great International Exhibition in London. Invented by Alexander Parkes, this celluloid is credited by the London Science Museum to be "generally accepted as the first plastic". (This presumably refers to synthetic plastic formed into objects: it is predated by the 1848 collodion, a nitrocellulose-based solution that dries to a celluloid-like film but is useless for industrial purposes, (as well as several natural plastics).

1862: James Moore Clements of Livery Street, who has already invented an improved machine for making buttonholes, is granted a patent for a new arrangement of 'stitching the hole'.

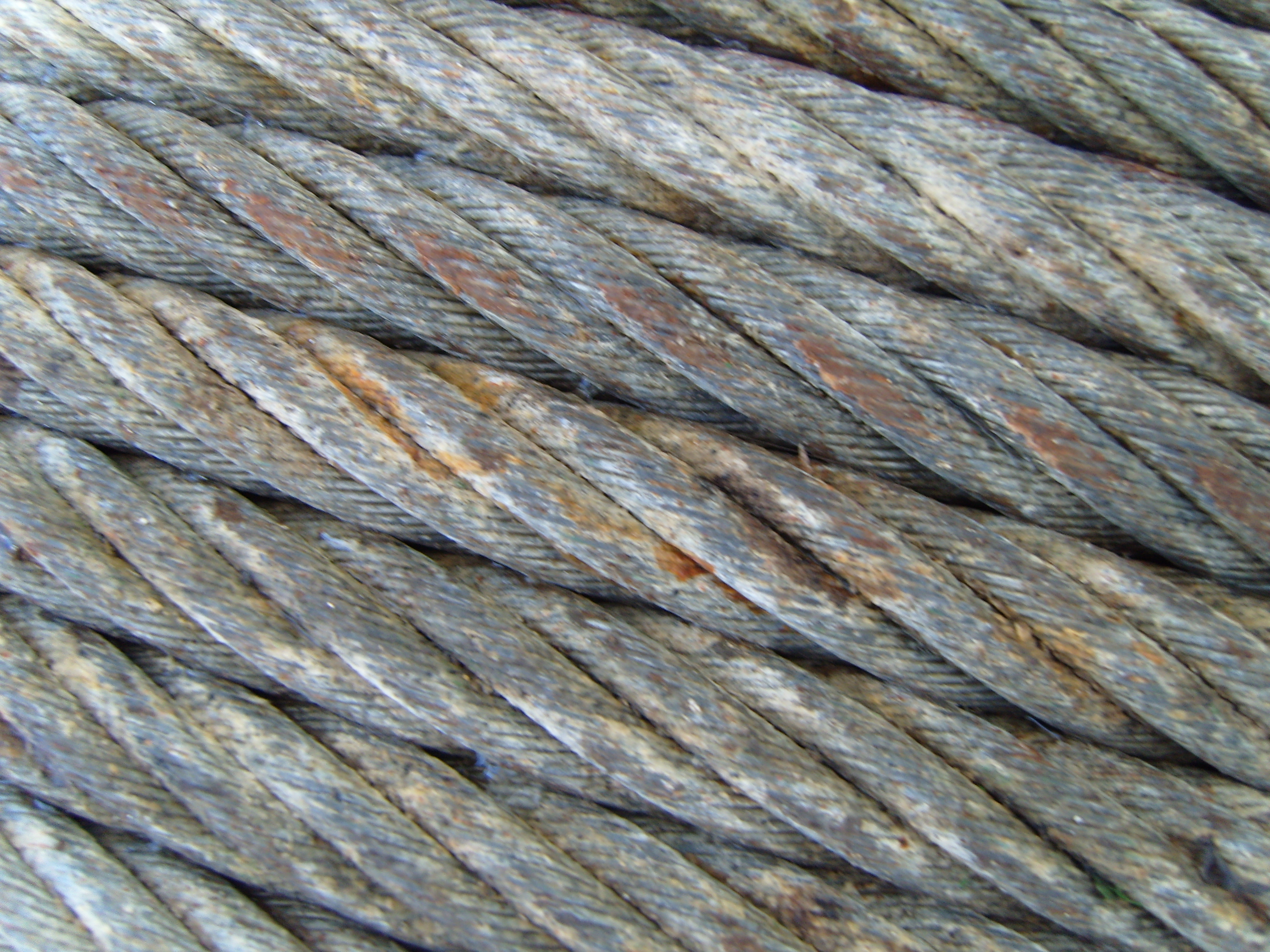
Birmingham has a long history of wire and cable manufacture, the industry set various international standards for wire gauges and the city became one of the foremost producers of wire for musical instruments in Europe. In 1865 the first successful Transatlantic telegraph cable was made by Webster and Horsfall, who also improved the manufacture of piano wire (giving them a near monopoly).

1863: William Sumner (founder of Typhoo) publishes "A Popular Treatise on Tea". In 1870, Sumner starts a pharmacy/grocery business on the High Street, Birmingham. This grows and forces Sumner to move to new premises on Castle Street and then on to Bordesley Street at the canalside. Typhoo tea later becomes one of the largest teabag makers in Britain. The brand is now based in Wirral.

1865: The steel wire, some 16,000 miles long, for sheathing the first successful Transatlantic telegraph cable is made by Webster and Horsfall, Birmingham.

1865: Joseph Hinks sets up James Hinks & Son, of 91-96 Great Hampton Street and 66 Hockley Street. He patents improvements to oil lamps, marketing the resultant Duplex Lamp, which is later used across the world and becomes a popular choice for railway workers.

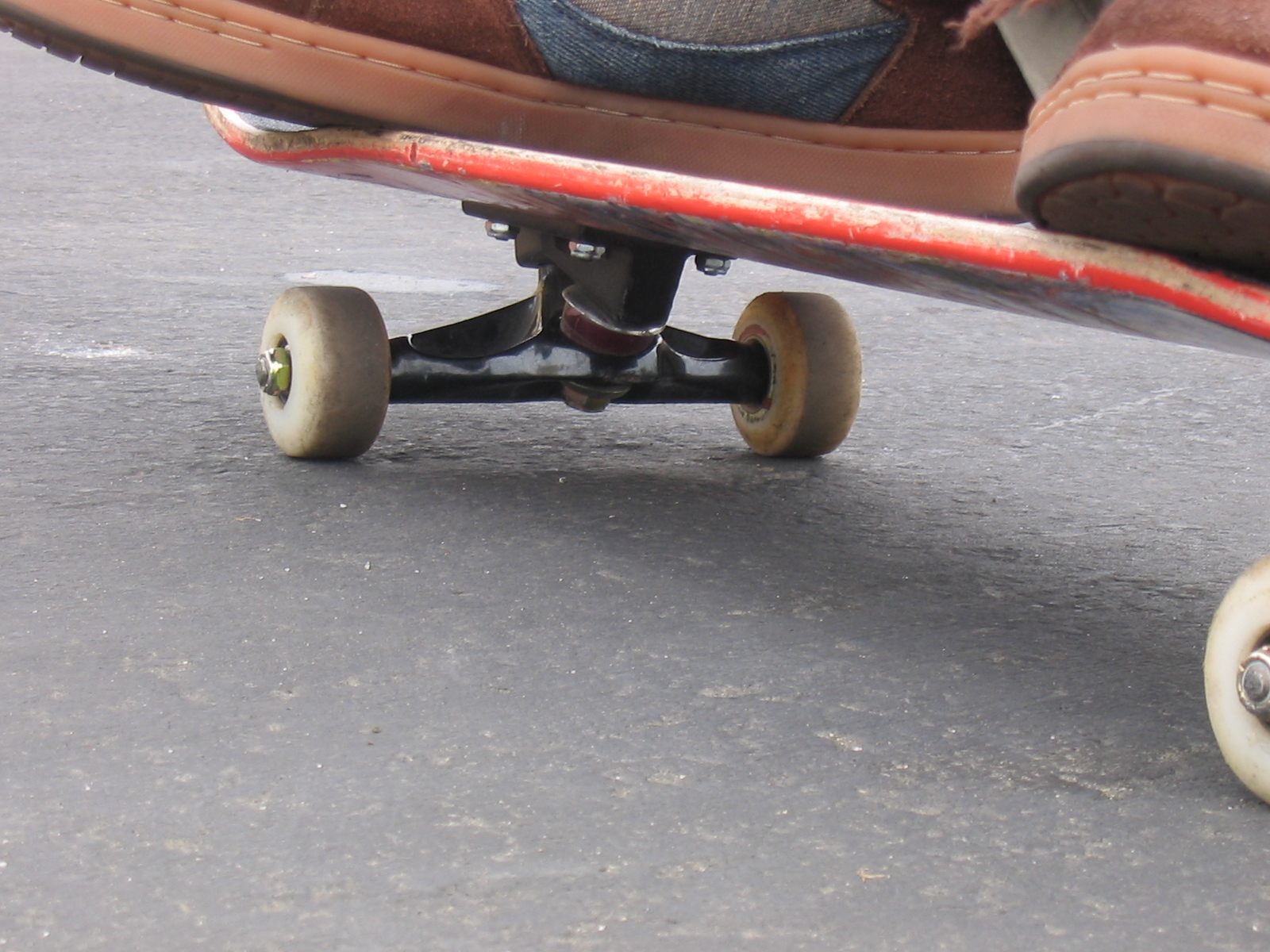
Skateboard wheels owe their existence to William Bown and Joseph Henry Hughes, who patented a design for the wheels of roller skates that kept the two bearing surfaces of an axle, fixed and moving, apart. This technique is still used today in automobiles and machinery.

1868: C. H. Gould patents a British stapler, although it remains unclear as to how different this is from U.S. patents of the same age.

1868: John Barnes Linnett patents the world's first flip book.

1873: William Westley Richards, gunmakers, takes out the first of many patents relating to the firearm, for which gold medals and royal warrants were awarded.

1875: Joseph Lucas begins making lamps for ships, concentrating on the new types of lamp burning paraffin and petroleum for which there is considerable demand. The business becomes Lucas Industries.

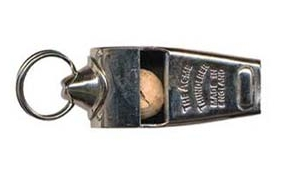
Joseph Hudson invented the world's most successful whistle to date, the 'Acme Thunderer' (the first ever pea whistle). Other firsts for Hudson include the introduction of the football referee whistle and the police whistle.

1876: William Bown patents a design for the wheels of roller skates that embodies his effort to keep the two bearing surfaces of an axle, fixed and moving, apart. Bown works closely with Joseph Henry Hughes, who draws up the patent for a ball or roller bearing race for bicycle and carriage wheels that includes all the elements of an adjustable system in 1877.

1878: Joseph Hudson makes the first whistle ever to be used by a football referee. It is used for the first time at a game held at Nottingham Forest, this replaces the referee's use of the handkerchief to attract footballers attention. Later, in 1883 Hudson invents and manufactures the first police whistle for the Metropolitan Police force, prior to this police use hand rattles, whistles are usually used as musical instruments or toys. His whistle is still used by the force and many others today. In 1884 Hudson invents the world's most successful whistle to date, the 'Acme Thunderer' (the first ever pea whistle). The whistle is used as an alarm or attention instrument by all manner of industries, sports and revellers. It continues to sell in great quantities throughout the world.

Autographic printing, a duplicating process for text and monochrome drawings, developed and patented by photographer Alfred Pumphrey (1830-1913), became popular in around 1878.

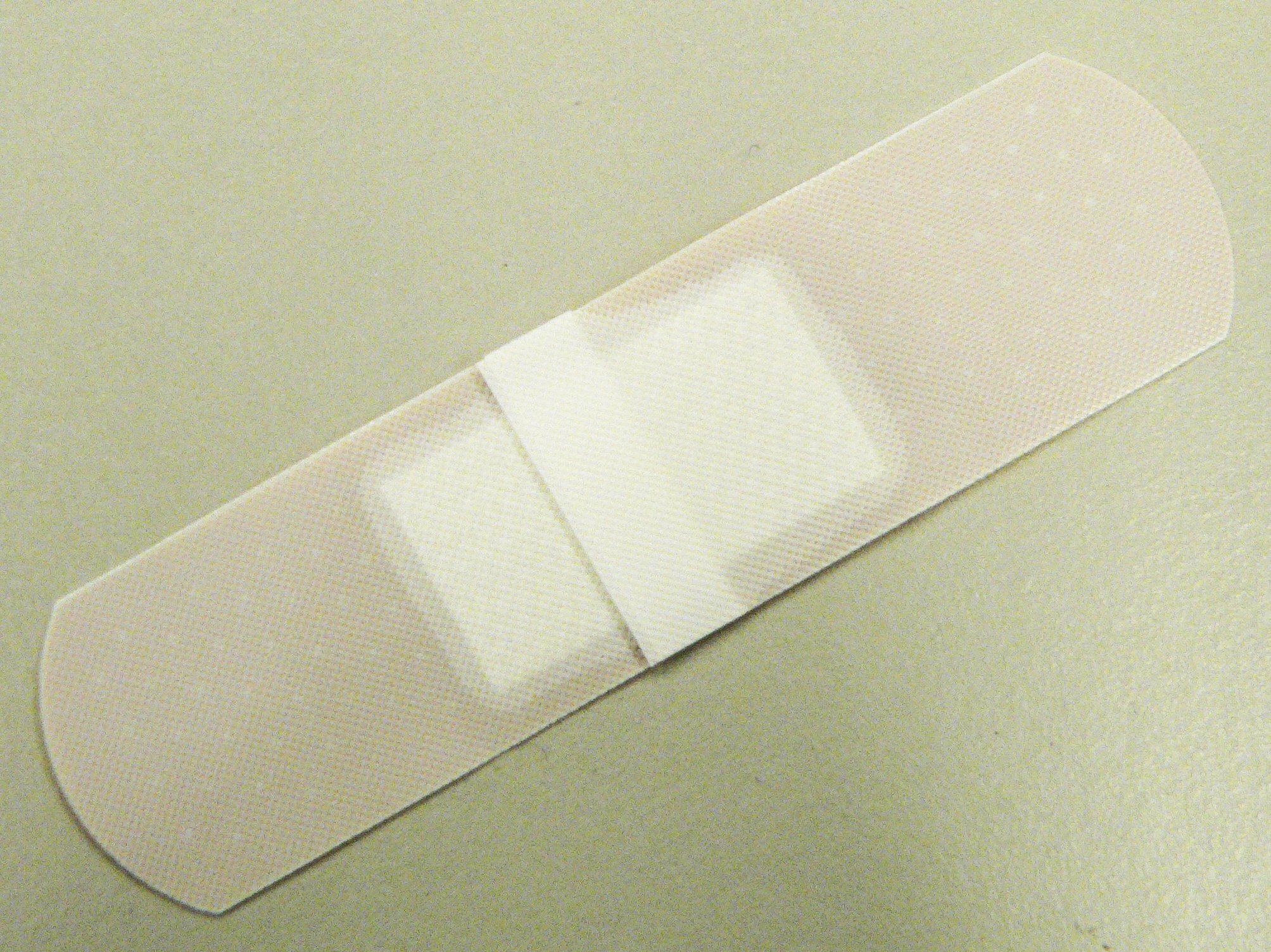
Dr Joseph Sampson Gamgee pioneered the use of cotton wool in the first medical context as Gamgee Tissue and his cottonwool gauze is still essential in the treatment of wounds today. The common sticking plaster (invented by Earle Dickson of New York in 1924) was based on Gamgee's gauze, however, Birmingham chemist Thomas Allcock invented a porous plaster for the relief of pain in New York as early as 1854.

1880: Gamgee Tissue, a surgical dressing with a thick layer of absorbent cotton wool between two layers of absorbent gauze, is invented by Joseph Sampson Gamgee. It represents the first use of cotton wool in a medical context, and is a major advancement in the prevention of infection of surgical wounds. It is still the basis for many modern surgical dressings. Gamgee also invents the aseptic technique, a procedure that is performed under sterile conditions. This includes medical and laboratory techniques, such as with microbiological cultures. It includes techniques like flame sterilization. The largest example of aseptic techniques is in hospital operating theatres. J. R. R. Tolkien later bases The Lord of the Rings character 'Sam Gamgee' on this character as they live near to Mr Gamgee.

During the late 19th century, Birmingham companies such as Joseph Lucas & Sons and Powell & Hammer pioneered the production of bicycle lamps and lanterns for ships, capitalising on the advances in using acetylene gas. The Birmingham lamps were exported around the world, with the Lucas company later becoming famous for manufacturing components related to the motor industry and aerospace industry. Richard Bissell Prosser (1838–1918) writes 58 lives for the Dictionary of National Biography, and supplies much material for the New English Dictionary. Prosser also writes Birmingham Inventors and Inventions, 1881 and is a pioneer of the study of technical history, his published biographies and manuscript records are an incomparable source for present-day researchers. His father Richard Prosser (1804–1854), engineer and inventor, was heavily involved with the introduction of the Patent Law Amendment Act 1852, and his 700-volume library, combined with that of Bennet Woodcroft forms the basis of the Patent Office Library.

1879: Harry Lucas designs a hub lamp for use in a high bicycle and names the oil lamp "King of the Road".

1881: Birmingham businessman John Skirrow Wright invents the postal order and its use subsequently spreads across the world. Skirrow becomes one of the prominent pioneers and social improvers of the 19th century.

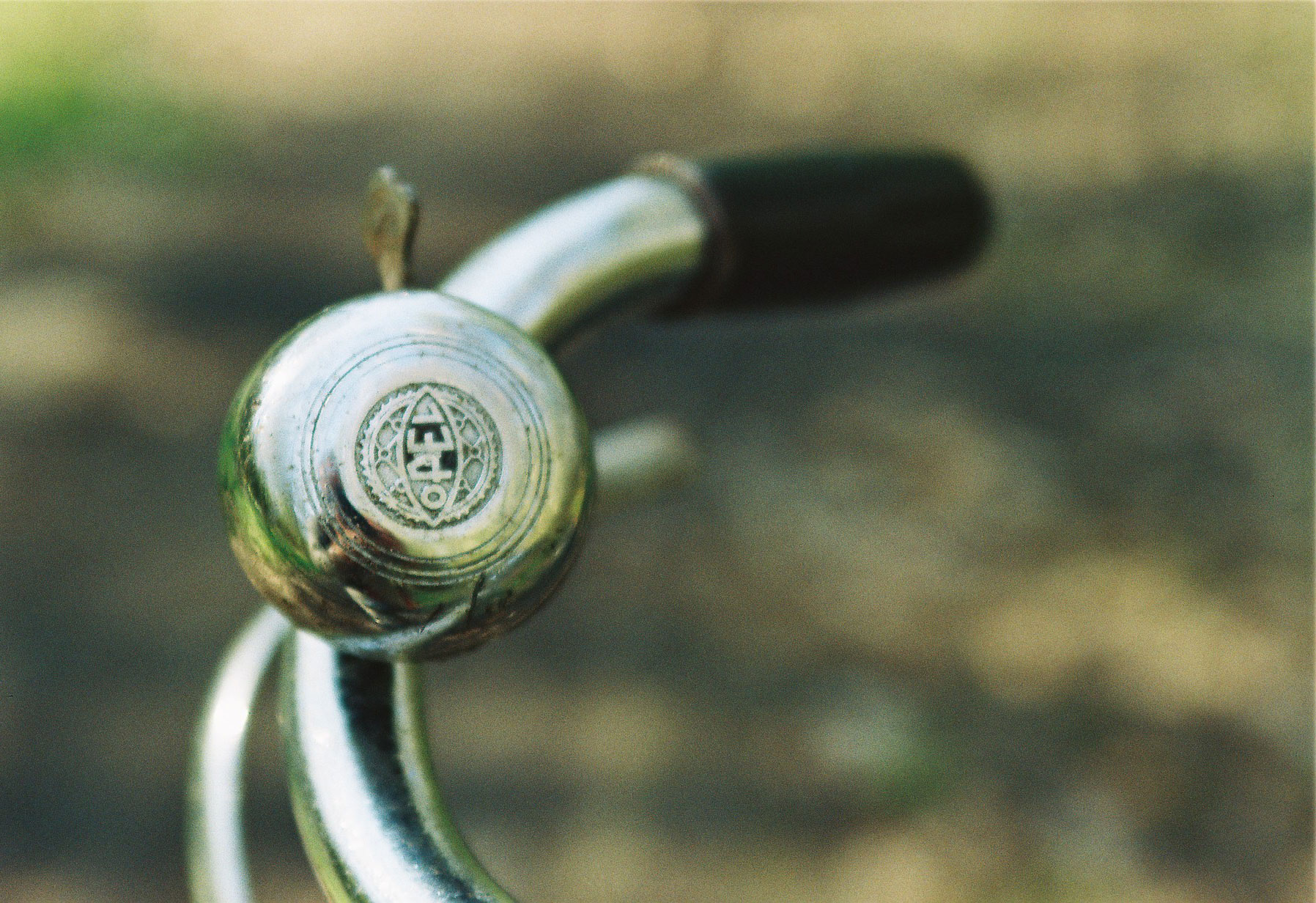
The bicycle bell was invented by John Richard Dedicoat and his patents appear as early as 1877.

John Richard Dedicoat invents a bicycle bell, his patents for bicycle bells appear as early as 1877. Apprenticed to James Watt, Dedicoat goes on to become a bicycle manufacturer and makes and sells the "Pegasus" bicycle.

1883: Surgeon and gynaecologist Lawson Tait, pioneer of several surgical procedures, carries out the world's first successful operation on a ruptured ectopic pregnancy.

1884: John Berry Haycraft has been actively engaged in research and published papers on the coagulation of blood and in 1884, he discovers that the leech secretes a powerful anticoagulant, which he names hirudin.

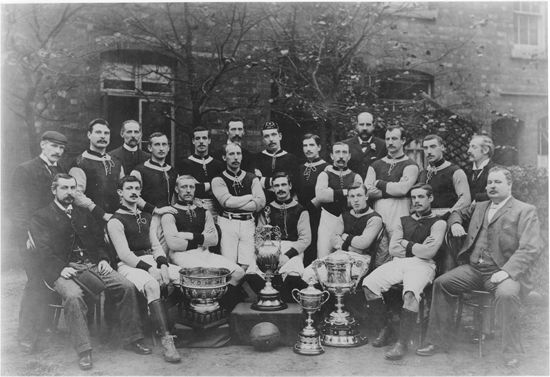
The world's first Football League was founded in Birmingham by William McGregor in 1885, McGregor was a director of Aston Villa (pictured in their 1883-4 strip). Villa were very successful around this time, before money and international players dictated top flight success.

1885: Birmingham School of Art becomes the first municipal school of art. It later becomes the leading centre for the Arts and Crafts movement.

1885: The world's first professional football league is founded at a meeting in Aston under the auspices of William McGregor, a director of Aston Villa.

1889: Charles Pinkney of Tangyes perfects a gas engine, this comes about through his experimentation with a hydrocarbon gas producer and a bituminous coal gas generator. The engine proves to be more economical that an earlier Four-stroke Otto cycle engine.

1891: The Dunlop Rubber Company co-founded by John Boyd Dunlop established its Birmingham factory Fort Dunlop, later to become the focus of Dunlop as one of the largest multinational manufacturers of automotive and aeronautical tyres.

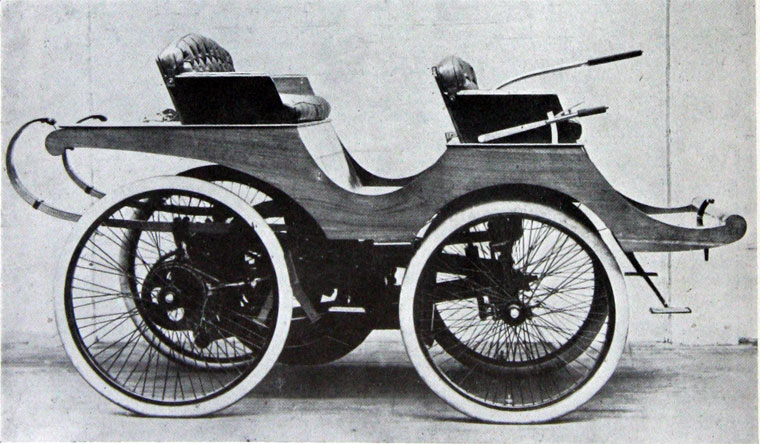
Frederick William Lanchester and his brother built the first petrol driven four-wheeled car in Britain. The Lanchester Motor Company went on to pioneer many advances in engineering.

1894: Richard Norris, a doctor of medicine and professor of physiology at Queen's College, Birmingham, brings out a new patent of dry plate used in photography and is generally credited with the first development of the collodion dry plate in the 1860s.

1895: Frederick William Lanchester and his brother build the first petrol driven four-wheeled car in Britain. Lanchester also experiments with the wick carburetor, fuel injection, turbochargers and invents the accelerator pedal and first uses the pendulum governor for controlling the speed of a car engine. In 1893 he designs and builds his first engine (a vertical single cylinder) that is fitted to the first British motorboat.

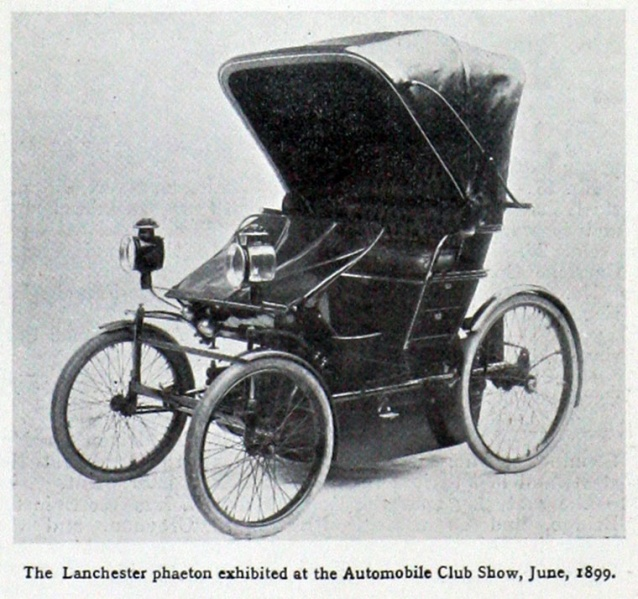
During the late 19th century, Birmingham, Coventry, Wolverhampton and West Bromwich engineering companies were at the forefront of the burgeoning automobile and motocycle industries. Early horseless carriages such as the 1899 Lanchester Phaeton (pictured) were made possible in the region thanks to an existent array of metalwork and engineering skills that were mainly evolving out of the bicycle industry.

1895: Herbert Austin, an employee at Wolseley Sheep Shearing Company, becomes interested in engines and automobiles. During the winter of 1895–96 he makes his own version of a design by Léon Bollée that he has seen in Paris. Later he finds that another British group have bought the rights, therefore Austin has to come up with a design of his own.

Two years later, the second Wolseley car is revealed. It is a three-wheeled design featuring independent rear suspension, mid-engine and back-to-back seating for two adults. Four years later the Wolseley Gasoline Carriage is built featuring a steering wheel instead of a tiller. Austin manages the new Wolseley company for a short time before resigning to form his own concern, the Austin Motor Company, in 1905.

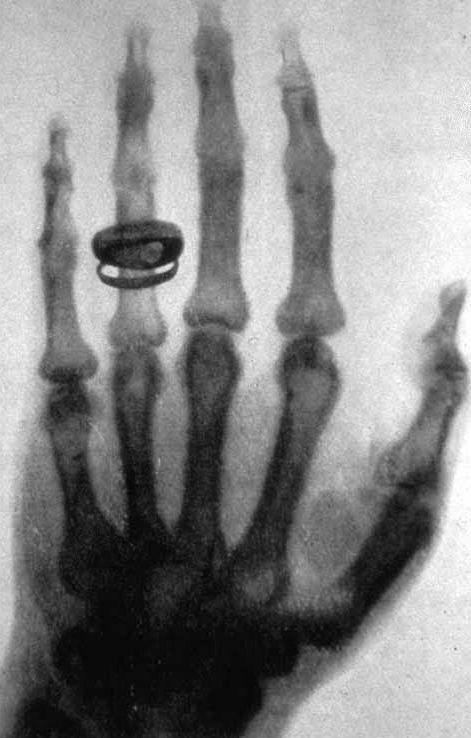
An early radiograph. The first radiograph used to assist in surgery was taken by the pioneer of medical X-rays, Major John Hall-Edwards.

Wolseley later becomes a successful car and engine maker selling upmarket cars, and even opens a lavish showroom, Wolseley House, in Piccadilly London (next to the Ritz Hotel, now housing a restaurant called The Wolseley). The company is later merged in other motor car companies.

1896: The first radiograph used to assist in surgery is taken in Birmingham by the British pioneer of medical X-rays, Major John Hall-Edwards thus kick-starting a whole new field of medical science.

1896: A new building is built in Corporation Street to house James Henry Cook's vegetarian restaurant, one of the first in England. In 1898, 'The Pitman Vegetarian Hotel', named after the famous vegetarian Sir Isaac Pitman, opens on the same site, and the proprietors subsequently open a long-running health food store.

1896: The first 'public' trial in Birmingham of a "horseless carriage" or motor car takes place at Cannon Hill Park.

1897: John Benjamin Stone founds the National Photographic Record Association, of which he becomes president. The National Portrait Gallery holds 62 of his portraits and many photographs of people and places in and around Westminster. His career culminates in 1911 with his appointment as official photographer to the coronation of King George V. Stone travels widely in pursuit of his hobby, taking 26,000 photographs, and writing books as he travels. He publishes works and invaluable records of the folk customs and traditions of the British Isles, which later influence photographers of note, such as Tony Ray-Jones.

1897: The Reynolds Tube Company patents the process for making butted bicycle tubes, which are thicker at the ends than in the middle, this allows frame builders to create frames that are both strong and lightweight. Reynolds continues to develop lightweight bicycle frames into the 20th century picking up many awards for wins in races such as the Tour de France, the company still makes lightweight frames in the city today.

J. Lancaster & Son was a photographic company, formed in 1835 when James Lancaster started an optical firm for the manufacture of glasses, microscopes, and telescopes. By 1898 it claimed to be the world's largest camera manufacturer having sold over 200,000 cameras and produced products such as the Gem Apparatus of 1880, a camera with twelve lenses to shoot the same subject twelve times at once and a Telescopic Patent Watch Camera in pocket watch format.

== 20th century ==
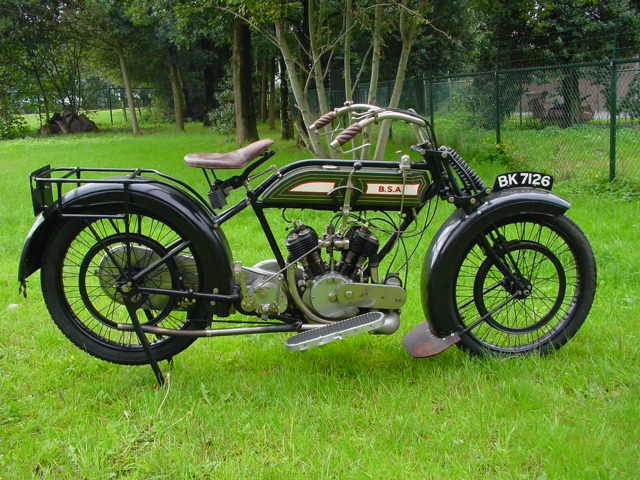
Out of Birmingham's bicycle manufacturers, there emerged a plethora of cutting edge automobile and motorcycle brands. Motorcycles from New Hudson, Revere, Beardmore, Sun, Ariel, Norton, Rex-Acme, Alldays & Onions, Velocette and BSA made Birmingham into an international hub for motorcycle manufacture. At its peak, BSA was the largest motorcycle producer in the world and engineers such as James Lansdowne Norton pioneered engineering in the city, helping Birmingham-made motorbikes to win many awards for speed and quality.

Bicycles have been manufactured in the Midlands (mainly Birmingham and Coventry) since the mid 19th century. By 1900 Birmingham has the largest number of bicycle makers and component manufacturers in Britain. Several advances in the development of the bicycle take place, one of the longer established high quality manufacturers being the Quadrant Cycle Company of Sheepcote Street, which later manufactures motorbikes (as do many cycle makers).

Other notable firms are Reynolds (still manufacturing in the city), New Hudson, Rudge-Whitworth (also of Coventry), BSA, CWS, Dawes, Grundle, James Cycle Co, Ariel, Armstrong Cycles, Phillips Cycles, Excelsior (originally of Coventry), Sun Cycle & Fittings Co, Pashley Cycles (now manufactured in Stratford-upon-Avon) and Hercules Cycle and Motor Company.

Through the 20th century, many of Birmingham's bicycle manufacturers evolve into automobile and motorcycle brands, creating one of the busiest and most productive engineering hubs in the world.

Reynolds bicycle frames are extremely lightweight and have been used in several winning Tour de France bikes. Reynolds still manufactures frames in the city today.

Motor engineering brands such as Wolseley, Lanchester, Metro-Cammell, Austin, Morris, Vickers-Armstrongs, New Hudson, Revere, Beardmore, Sun, Ariel, Norton, Rex-Acme, Alldays & Onions, Velocette, Midland Red and BSA either originate or have substantial factories in Birmingham, manufacturing motorbikes, buses, tractors, cars, tanks and aeroplanes.

Other diverse engineering companies develop to feed the supply chain of the motoring industry such as Webster and Horsfall (pioneering wire for aircraft and cars), Dunlop Rubber (supplying rubber and tyres), Lucas Industries (pioneering electric and lighting), Accles & Pollock (producing tubular sections for aircraft) and Pockley Electric (manufacturing car lights).

1900: Bournville Village Trust is founded by George Cadbury, this is to make many improvements and set high standards of living and leisure pastimes for factory workers across Britain. Cadbury's still makes chocolate in the city today and Bournville remains a sought after area to live in.

1900: John Wright invents a much-improved gas fire, which uses fretted columns of fireclay, rather than tufted asbestos, to radiate the heat. The Wright design of gas fire heating endures throughout the century, however, electric fires improve at a similar pace.

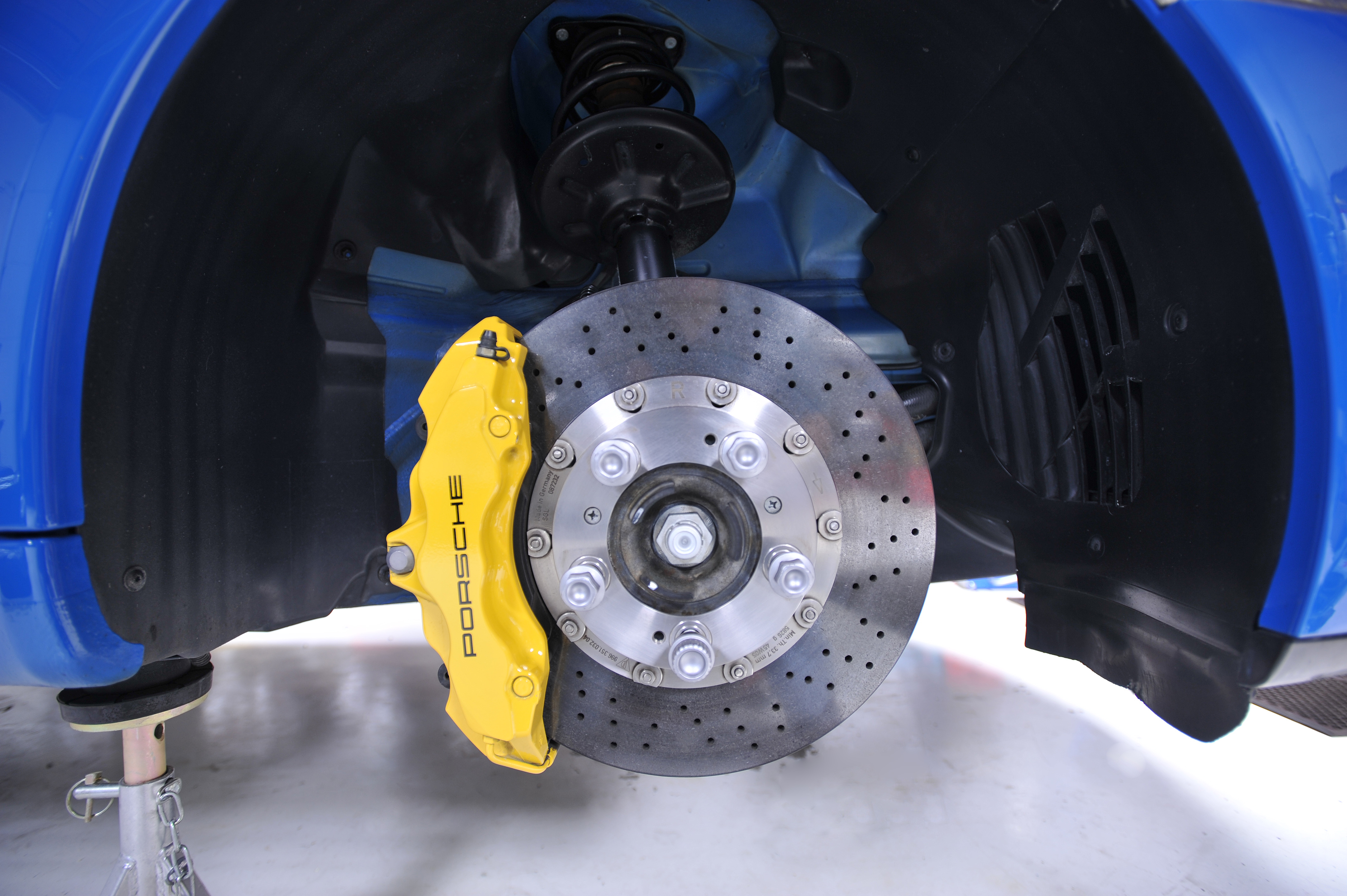
Porsche Carrera S composite ceramic brake, perfected over one hundred years after the original patent is taken out by Frederick William Lanchester

1902: The first caliper-type automobile disc brake is patented by Frederick William Lanchester in his Birmingham factory and used successfully on Lanchester cars. However, the limited choice of metals in this period means that he has to use copper as the braking medium acting on the disc. The poor state of the roads at this time — no more than dusty, rough tracks — means that the copper wears quickly, making the disc brake system non-viable. It is not until 1929, in the same city that manufacturers Girling and New Hudson further develop disc brakes, which are very successful on racing cars from the early 1950s to the 1970s. Girling brakes have the quirk of using natural rubber (later nitrile) seals. Girling still manufacture disc brakes in Birmingham today.

1902: George Andrew Darby patents the first electrical heat detector and smoke detector.

1903: Birmingham-born patent lawyer Bertram Hopkinson is elected to the Cambridge chair in mechanism and applied mechanics, where he carries out early research on tank armour plating.

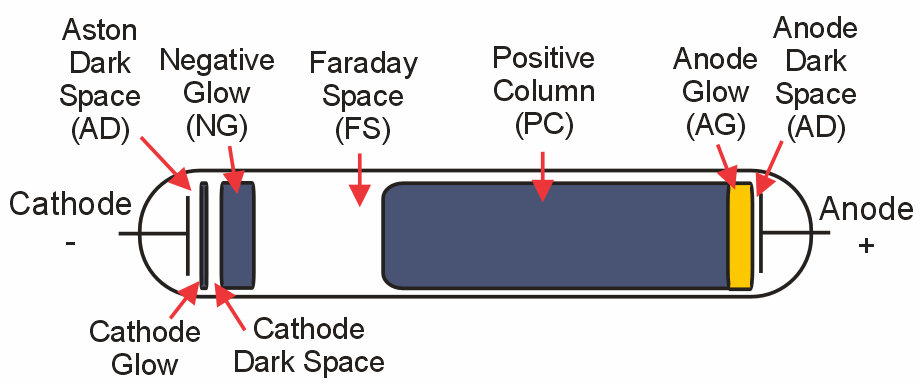
An electric glow discharge tube featuring its most important characteristics: (a) An anode and cathode at each end (b) Aston Dark Space (c) Cathode glow (d) Cathode dark space (also called Crookes dark space, or Hittorf dark space) (e) Negative glow (f) Faraday space (g) Positive column (h) Anode glow (i) Anode dark space.

Hopkinson builds a team of researchers, one of whom is Harry Ricardo, the engineer who makes his name for his pioneering work on internal combustion engines. Hopkinson encourages Ricardo to work on engines.

1903: Brummie Francis William Aston wins a scholarship to the University of Birmingham and in his studies of electronic discharge tubes he discovers the phenomenon now known as the Aston Dark Space. He later moves to the Cavendish Laboratory in Cambridge, where he uses a method of electromagnetic focusing to invent the mass spectrograph, which rapidly allows him to identify no fewer than 212 of the 287 naturally occurring isotopes. His work on isotopes also leads to his formulation of the Whole Number Rule, which is later used extensively in the development of nuclear energy. In 1922 he wins the Nobel Prize in Chemistry for the invention of the mass spectrometer.

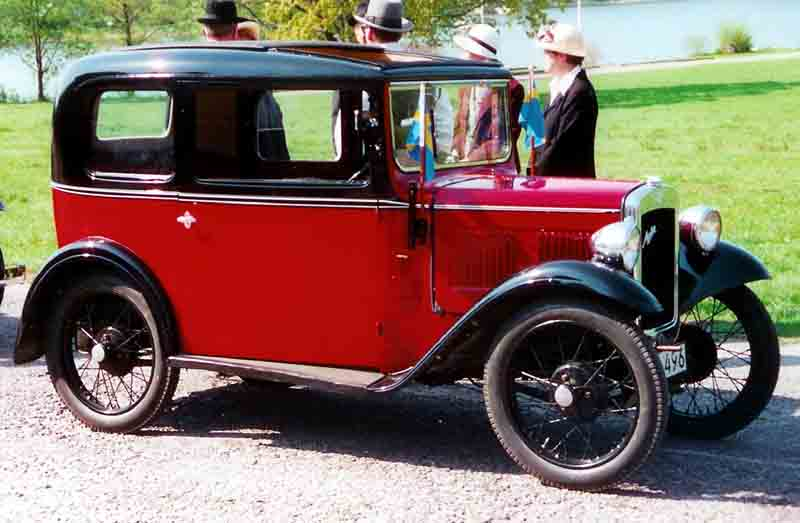
In 1905 Herbert Austin began making cars at his new Longbridge plant, seventeen years later the Austin 7 went into production, it was one of the most popular cars ever produced for the British market, its effect on the British market was similar to that of the Model T Ford in the USA. It was also licensed and copied by companies all over the world. The very first successful BMW car, the BMW Dixi, was a licensed Austin 7. In Japan Nissan also used the 7 design as the basis for their original cars. Many Austin 7s were rebuilt as "specials" after the Second World War, including the first Lotus, the Lotus Mk1, which was based on an Austin 7.

1905: A manually powered domestic vacuum cleaner is invented by manufacturer Walter Griffiths of 72, Conybere Street, Highgate. It is originally patented as 'Griffiths' Improved Vacuum Apparatus for Removing Dust from Carpets'. Although an electric cleaner is patented in 1901 by H. Cecil Booth, Griffiths' design is more similar to modern portable cleaners than Booth's cart-mounted device.

1905: Herbert Austin begins making cars at Longbridge, many improvements in mass car manufacture and production later arise from these car works. Seventeen years later the Austin 7 goes into production, it becomes one of the most popular cars ever produced for the British market, its effect on the British market is similar to that of the Model T Ford in the USA. Austin's designs and production help set up other car brands around the world that later become famous in their own right, such as BMW, Nissan and Lotus.

1905: Accles & Pollock Produces the first tubular box spanners.

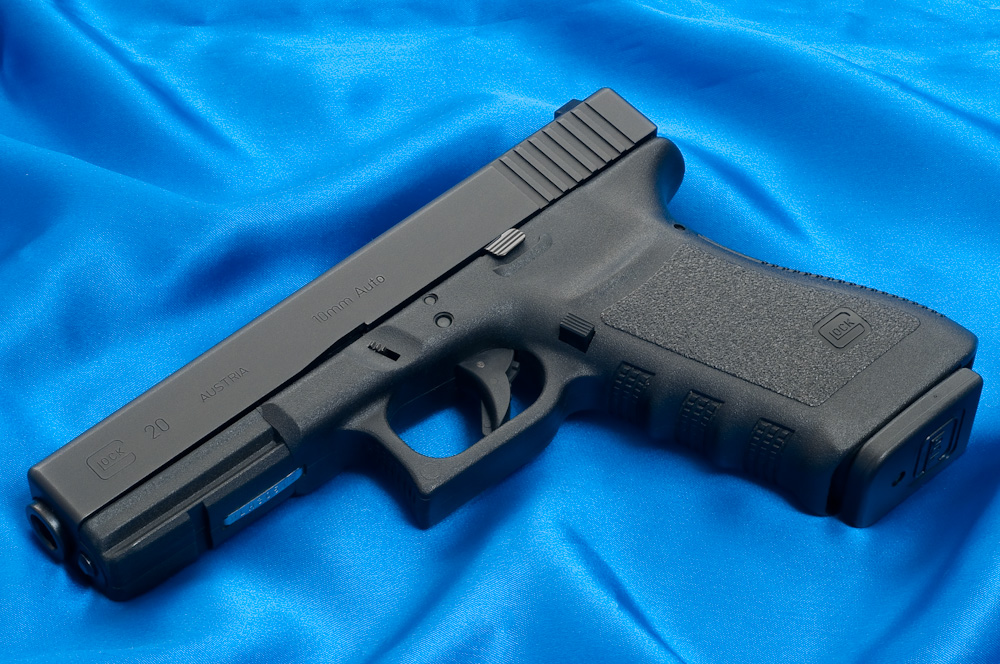
Glock 20 pistol with a black Parkerized topcoat. Parkerizing (also called phosphating and phosphatizing) is a method of protecting a steel surface from corrosion and increasing its resistance to wear. Thomas Watts Coslett was a pioneer in this field.

1906: The earliest work on the parkerizing processes is developed by British inventors William Alexander Ross, in 1869, and by Thomas Watts Coslett, in 1906. Coslett, of Birmingham, subsequently files a patent based on this same process in America in 1907. It essentially provides an iron phosphating process, using phosphoric acid. Parkerizing (also called phosphating and phosphatizing) is a method of protecting a steel surface from corrosion and increasing its resistance to wear. Parkerizing is commonly used on firearms.

1907: Accles & Pollock produce the first tubular sections for aircraft and the first tubular furniture.

1908: Pockley Automobile Electric Lighting Syndicate markets the world's first electric car lights to be sold as a set, which consist of headlights, sidelights and tail lights and are powered by an 8 volt battery.

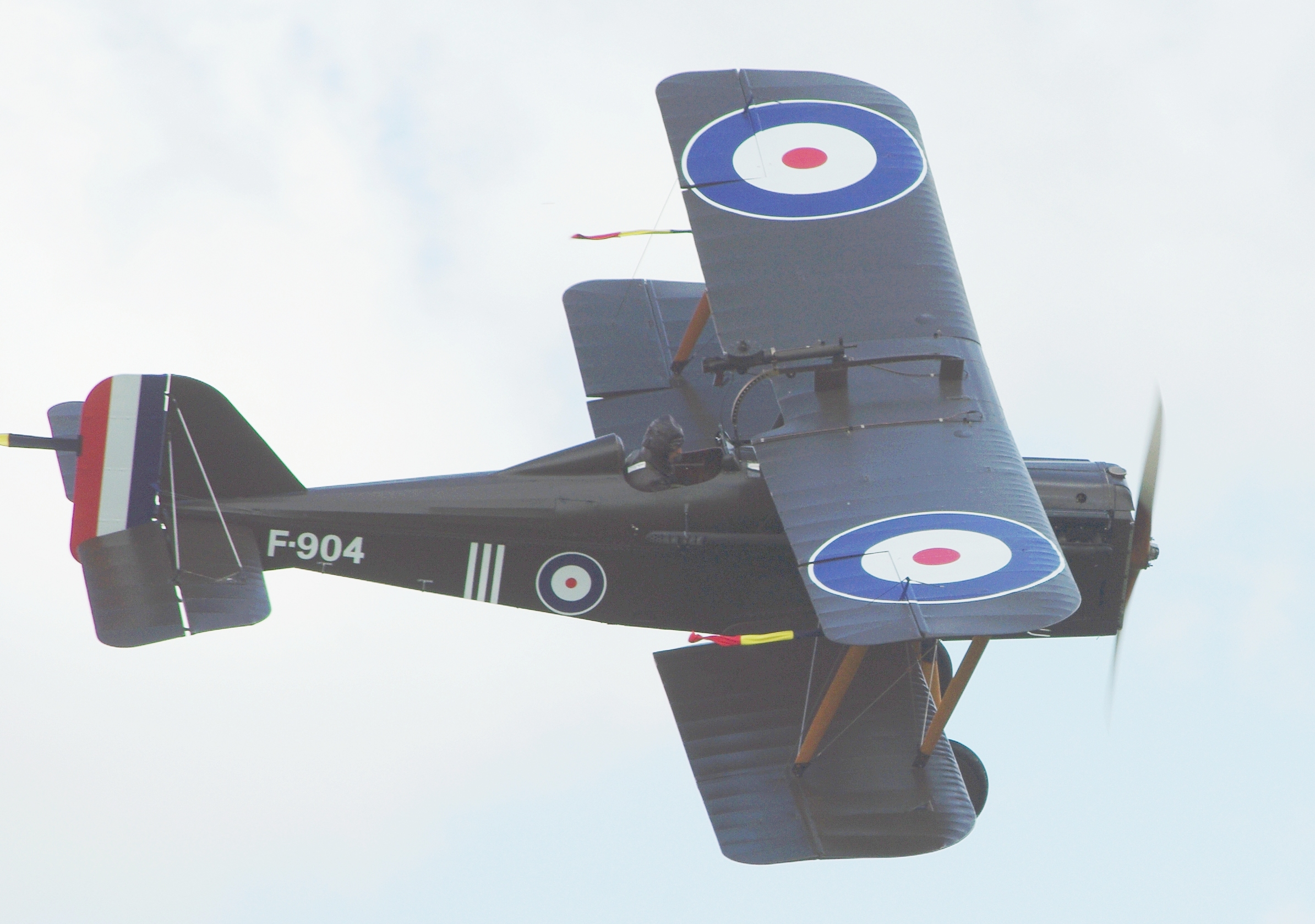
The S.E.5 biplane fighter was built by Austin and Wolseley Motors in Birmingham. The city produced 2081 S.E.5s. Brum also produced Spitfires, Hawker Hurricanes, Fairey Battle light bombers, Mercury and Pegasus aero engines, Short Stirling four-engined heavy bombers and Avro Lancasters during the Second World War.

Birmingham's ingenuity and expertise in metal working aids the early production of lightweight tubing used in the construction of successful airplanes. Engineering firms pioneer advances in aircraft engines also such as Austin and Wolseley Motors, who later build hundreds of early aircraft for the British Air force, such as the S.E.5 biplane fighter. Wolseley help to set Vickers on their path to motor and engine development for aircraft at Adderly Park, with a new engine ready for production by 1909. The Wolseley Viper engine is applied to many aircraft around this time and is developed out of the Hispano-Suiza 8. Several other small engineering firms design and build early aircraft engines such as Maxfield & Co, who test an early monoplane in 1909 at Castle Bromwich, the Butterfield Brothers also make an experimental aircraft engine in 1911. Birmingham engineering works later diversify with all manner of industries relating to the development and manufacture of aircraft components including assembly of whole planes during war years such as Spitfires, Hawker Hurricanes, Fairey Battle light bombers, Mercury and Pegasus aero engines, Short Stirling four-engined heavy bombers and Avro Lancasters (towards the end of World War II).

1910: J. R. R. Tolkien begins to construct his first Elfin tongue whilst a pupil at King Edward's School, Birmingham. He later calls it Qenya (c. 1915). Tolkien is already familiar with Latin, Greek, Spanish, and several ancient Germanic languages, Gothic, Old Norse and Old English. Tolkien's parents are from Birmingham and he himself grows up, and studies in and around Birmingham (Tolkien also meets his wife in the town and considers himself a 'West Midlander'). The enduring popularity of The Lord of the Rings later leads to numerous references in popular culture, the founding of many societies by fans of Tolkien's works, and the publication of many books about Tolkien and his works. The Lord of the Rings continues to inspire artwork, music, films and television, video games and subsequent literature, including reference in the Oxford English Dictionary. Award-winning adaptations of The Lord of the Rings are later made for radio, theatre and film.

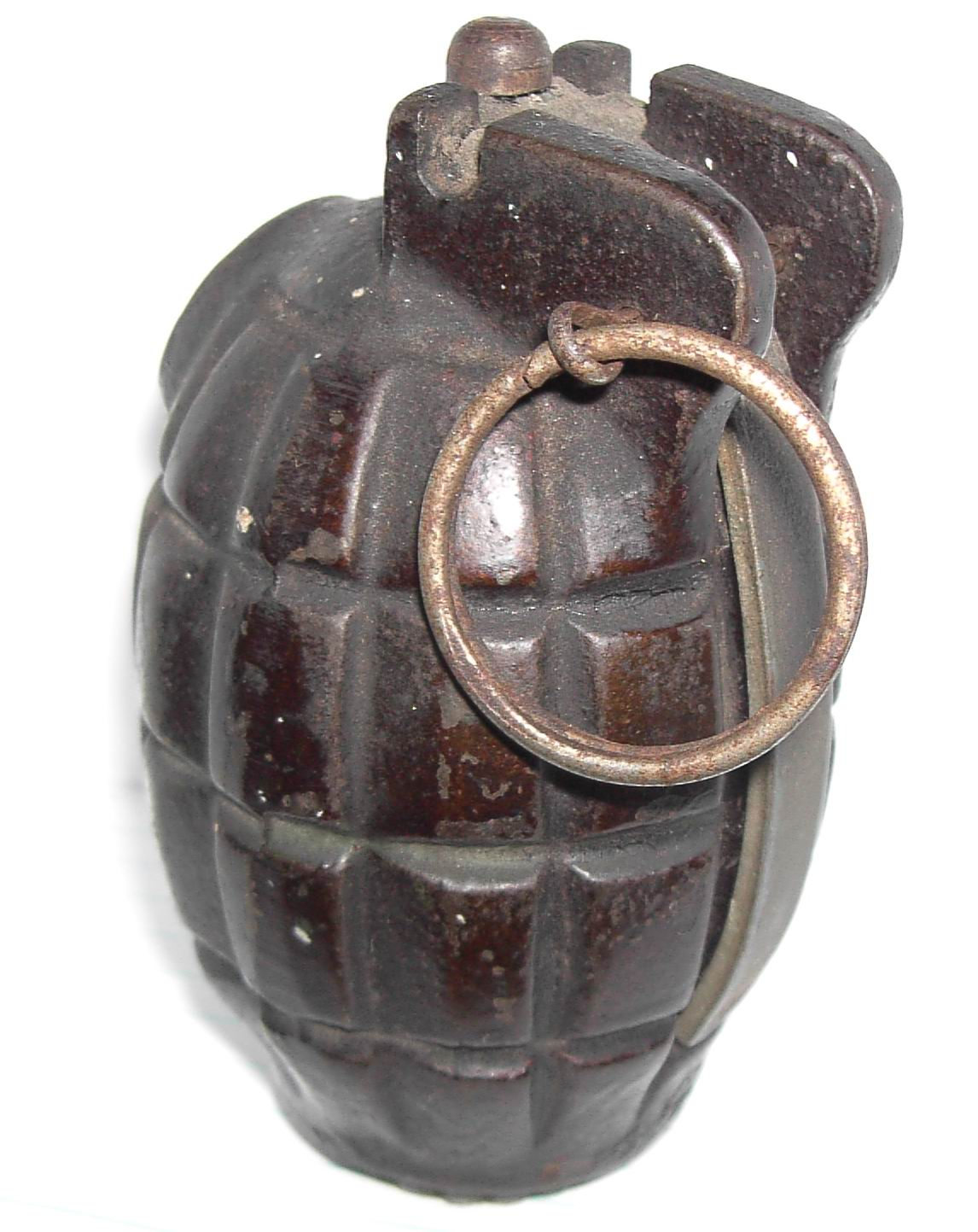
Mills bomb 36M, dating from 1942. The Mills bomb was adopted by the British Army as its standard hand grenade in 1915 and underwent many developments.

1910: Oliver Lucas's company design and make an electric car vehicle horn, which becomes industry standard; an electric motorcycle horn is manufactured the following year.

1913: Accles & Pollock is granted a patent for seamless tapered steel golf shafts.

1914: Oliver Lucas and Charles Breeden carry out pioneering work on the design of the dynamo and electric equipment for motorcycles and by 1914 they are already manufacturing these items.

1914 Birmingham, by now, is supplying the world with 28 million mass-produced pen nibs per week.

1915: William Mills develops the first "safe grenade" meaning it is safe for the soldier throwing it rather than his opponent. It is named the Mills bomb, and is adopted by the British Army as its standard hand grenade in 1915. 75,000,000 grenades are supplied during The Great War.

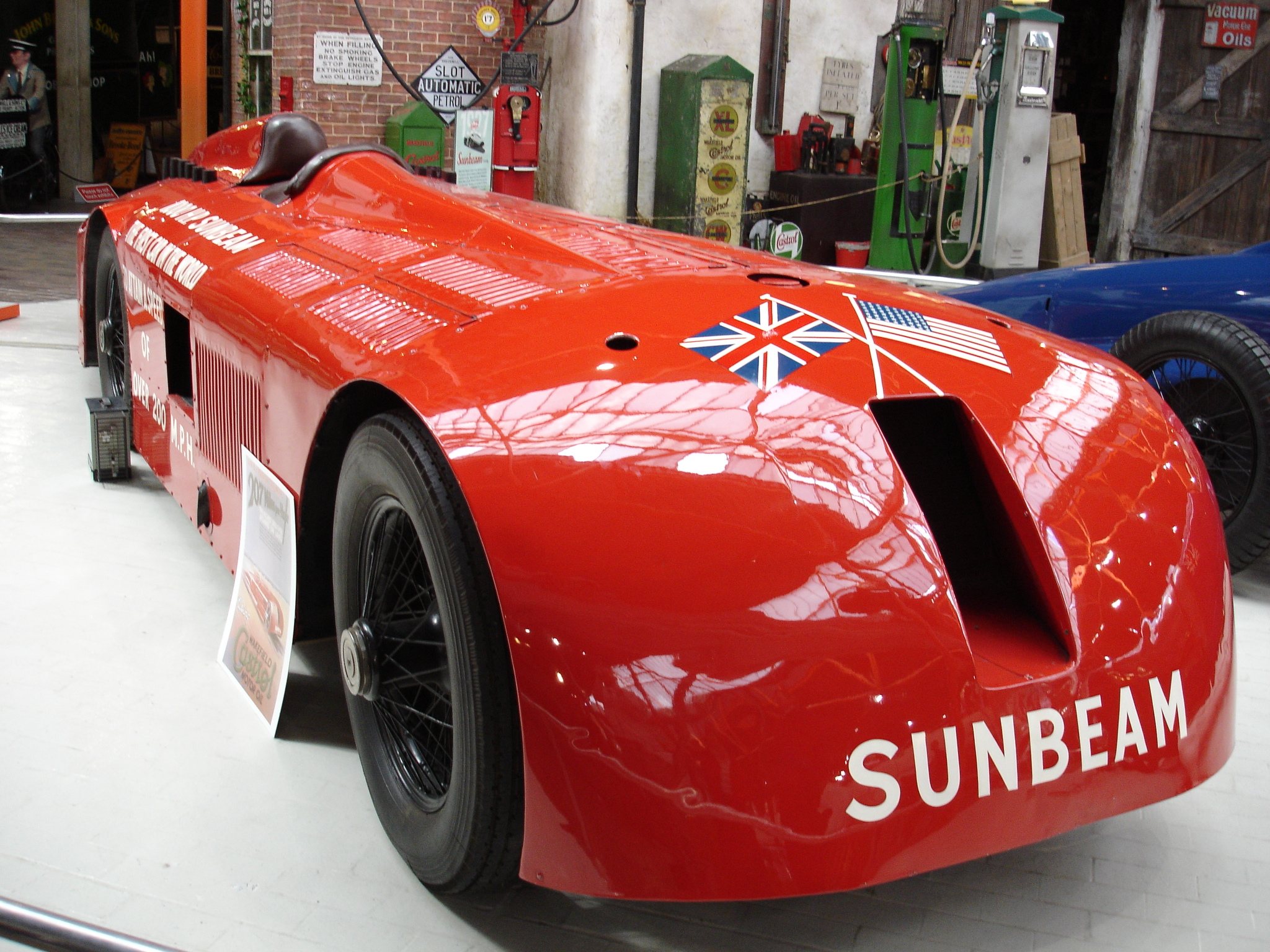
The first car in the world to travel at over 200 mph was built in nearby Wolverhampton and held the ground thanks to Dunlop's Birmingham-made tyres. Dunlop tyres were used on subsequent record breaking vehicles and became a popular choice for racing cars such as Formula 1.

1918: Much work is carried out by Oliver Lucas's company on the design and improvement of the military search light, he also designs a signalling lamp after experiences at the Somme and the design is later used by the British Army.

1919: The airbag "for the covering of aeroplane and other vehicle parts" traces its origins to a United States patent submitted in 1919 by two Birmingham dentists, Harold Round & Arthur Parrott, and approved in 1920.

1920: Charles Henry Foyle invents the folding carton and is founder of Boxfoldia. However, an American process is developed by accident prior to this.

1921: A British patent for windscreen wipers is registered by Mills Munitions. Several other patents take place for windscreen wipers around the world.

1922: Birmingham rubber manufacturer Dunlop invents a tyre with steel rods and a canvas casing that lasts three times longer than any other tyre, this is a milestone in tyre manufacture. The following year their tyres help Henry Segrave win a Grand Prix title in a Sunbeam racing car, and are then used on a Bentley to help win the 24 Hours of Le Mans race.

By 1927 Dunlop tyres have already helped Malcolm Campbell reach a British land speed record and in this year, they help Henry Segrave achieve the world land speed record in a Sunbeam 1000 hp at Daytona Beach Road Course, USA.

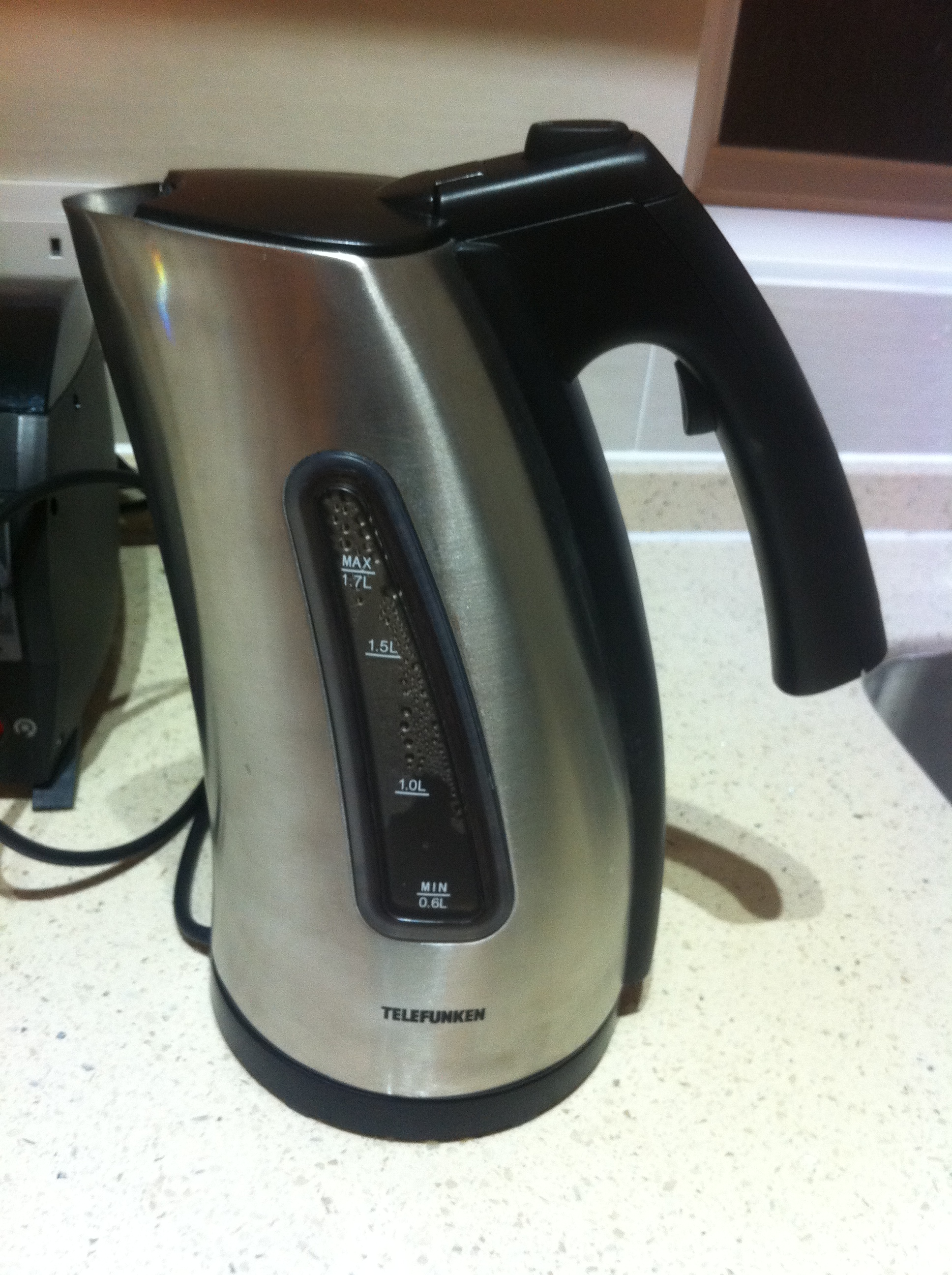
The electric kettle has changed little since the invention of an immersed heating resistor and the safety valve both by Birmingham firms.

In 1931 Dunlop tyres help Malcolm Campbell achieve a new land speed record in a Blue Bird at Daytona Beach Road Course, USA. In 1935 Dunlop helps Malcolm Campbell achieve yet another new land speed record in the USA. Foam rubber is also invented at the Dunlop Latex Development Laboratories, Fort Dunlop in 1929. Dunlop continues to pioneer advances in tyre manufacture and becomes industry standard for many prestigious car makers and its tyres have been used, and continue to be used, on cars achieving victory in motor rallies and racing championships such as Formula 1 and touring.

1923: Arthur L. Large invents the immersed heating resistor, a major advancement in the electric kettle. A safety valve is introduced by kettle maker Walter H. Bullpitt, also from Birmingham, in 1931. These two advances in electrical water heating are to have profound effects on water heating and become the basis of the modern day electric kettle.

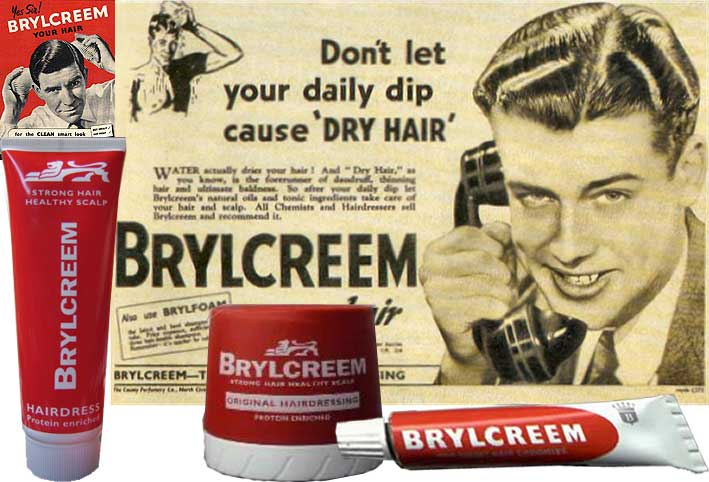
Brylcreem led the way with hair styling products throughout the mid 20th century, becoming standard choice for emerging UK fashions such as Teddy Boy.

1926: Cameras have been made in Birmingham since 1880, by companies such as J. Lancaster & Son and in 1926 Coronet begin manufacturing cameras in the city. Coronet eventually mass-produce cheap, but affordable cameras. Coronet have close links with other Birmingham camera makers such as Standard Cameras Ltd (featured in the National Media Museum) and E Elliott Ltd, who manufacture the unique and now collectible V. P. Twin (featured in the Museum of early consumer electronics and 1st achievements).

1928: Brummie, Oscar Deutsch opens his first Odeon Cinema in nearby Brierley Hill. By 1930, "Odeon" is a household name and the cinemas are known for their maritime-inspired Art Deco architecture. This style is first used in 1930 on the cinema at Perry Barr in Birmingham, which is bought by Deutsch to expand the chain. He likes the style so much that he commissions the architect, Harry Weedon, to design his future buildings. The Odeon cinema chain later becomes one of the largest cinema chains in Europe.

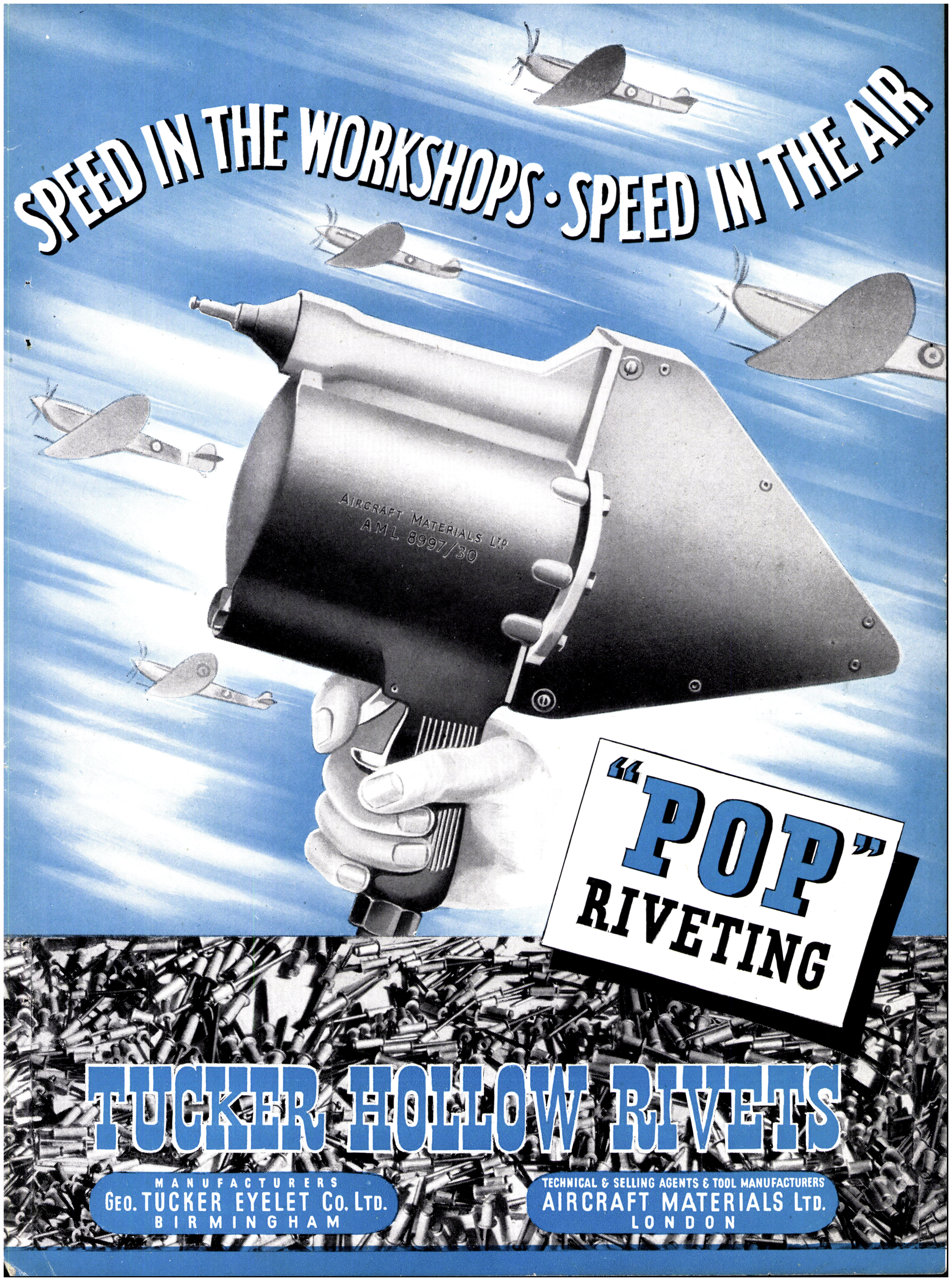
Speed in the Workshops - Speed in the Air, March 1944 Geo Tucker Eyelet Co. advert for pop rivets, featuring Spitfire aircraft

1928: The George Tucker Eyelet company, of Birmingham, England, produced a type of "cup" rivet. This is later developed as the "POP rivet".

1929: Brylcreem (made famous by the Teddy Boy) is invented in the city and later gives rise to other hair styling products.

First production run of Birmingham and Midland Motor Omnibus Company (Midland Red) buses takes place during the 1920s—one of the first British buses to have pneumatic tyres. BMMO later develop petrol and diesel engines during the 1930s, with experimental rear-engined buses being built. By the 1940s experiments with, and production of under-floor engined single-deck buses take place. Experiments and developments of independent front suspension, air suspension, rubber suspension, glass fibre construction and disc brakes take place during the 1950s. 1959 sees the introduction of a turbocharged coach capable of almost 100 mph, for non-stop motorway services. High speed (motorway) buses are developed with passenger toilets. During the 1960s BMMO becomes the first British bus company to make wide-scale use of computers in compiling bus schedules and staff rosters.

1932: The Birmingham Sound Reproducers company is set up in the West Midlands. In the early 1950s, Samuel Margolin begins buying auto-changing turntables from BSR, using them as the basis of his Dansette record player. Over the next twenty years, "Dansette" becomes a household word in Britain. By 1957, BSR has grown to employ 2,600 workers. In addition to manufacturing their own brand of player—the Monarch Automatic Record Changer that could select and play 7", 10" and 12" records at 33 1/3, 45 or 78 rpm, changing between the various settings automatically—BSR McDonald supplied turntables and autochangers to most of the world's record player manufacturers, eventually gaining 87% of the market. By 1977, BSR's various factories produced over 250,000 units a week.

1932: Leonard Parsons is the first to use synthetic vitamin C as treatment for scurvy in children.

1933: Credenda Conduit Co. Ltd of Birmingham patent a Credastat automatic oven thermostat, which is fitted to Creda electric cookers. This is an early advancement in electric cookers and a feature that eventually becomes standard on all electric cookers. An example of this cooker is on display at the London Science Museum.

1934: The Reynolds Tube Company introduces the double-butted tube-set 531 for high strength but lightweight bicycle frames. Reynolds 531 remains for many years at the forefront of alloy steel tubing technology and is used to form the front subframes on the Jaguar E-Type during the 1960s. Before the introduction of more exotic materials such as aluminium, titanium or composites, Reynolds is considered the dominant maker of high end materials for bicycle frames. According to the company, 27 winners of the Tour de France have won riding on Reynolds tubing.

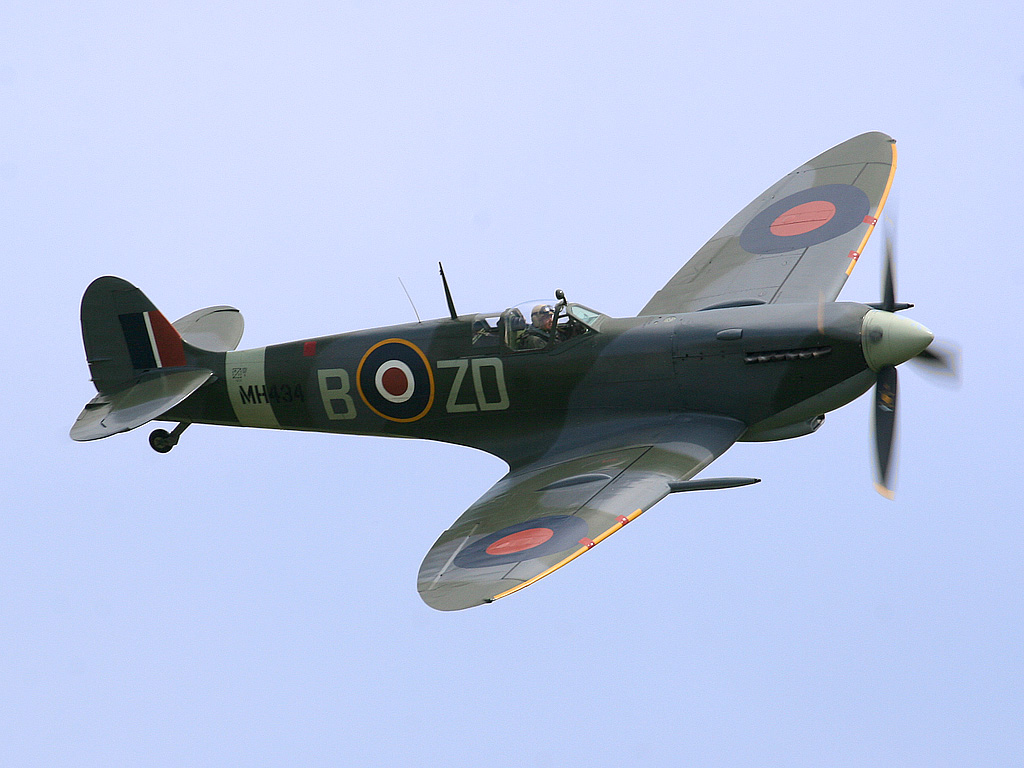
During the Second World War, Castle Bromwich Aircraft Factory was the largest Spitfire factory in the UK, producing a maximum of 320 aircraft per month, it built over half of the approximately 20,000 aircraft of this type. Despite being bombed, BSA made nearly 500,000 Browning guns during the Second World War, many of which were fitted to Spitfires.

1935: Birmingham has a long history of toy and trinket manufacture and in 1935 the biggest toy makers in England, Chad Valley, are appointed Toy Makers to the Queen of the United Kingdom. During their existence Chad Valley carry out several improvements and practices in the manufacture of toys during their production between the late 19th and mid-20th centuries, constantly striving to develop new board games, jigsaws and toys.

1937: Professor Norman Haworth is awarded the Nobel Prize for Chemistry for his pioneering work on carbohydrates and synthetic vitamin C.

1939: Dr Mary Evans and Dr Wilfred Gaisford begin trials of the world's first antibiotic M&B (sulfapyridine) as treatment for lobar pneumonia.

Birmingham becomes the major British manufacturer of the phenolic plastic Bakelite.

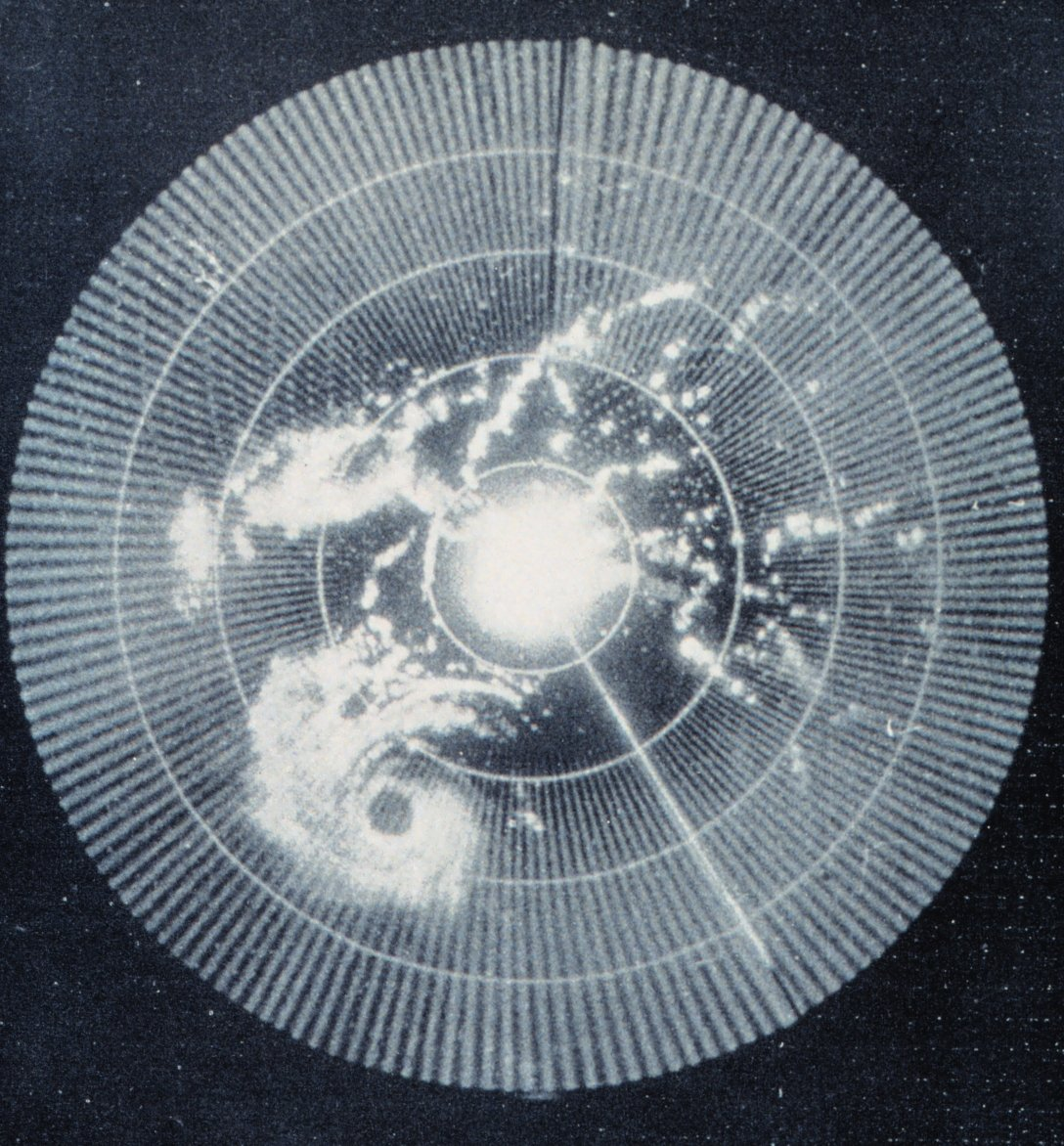
Major advances in radar take place at the University of Birmingham during the Second World War

The magnetron, the core component in the development of radar, and the first microwave power oscillators are developed at the University of Birmingham during World War II (the microwave oven owes its existence to these developments).

1940: After initial teething problems with management, Castle Bromwich Aircraft Factory started production of the Spitfire fighter plane. By the time production ended at Castle Bromwich in June 1945, a total of 12,129 Spitfires (921 Mk IIs, 4489 Mk Vs, 5665 Mk IXs and 1054 Mk XVIs) had been built. CBAF became the largest and most successful plant of its type during the 1939–45 conflict. As the largest Spitfire factory in the UK, by producing up to 320 aircraft per month, it built over half of the approximately 20,000 aircraft of this type.

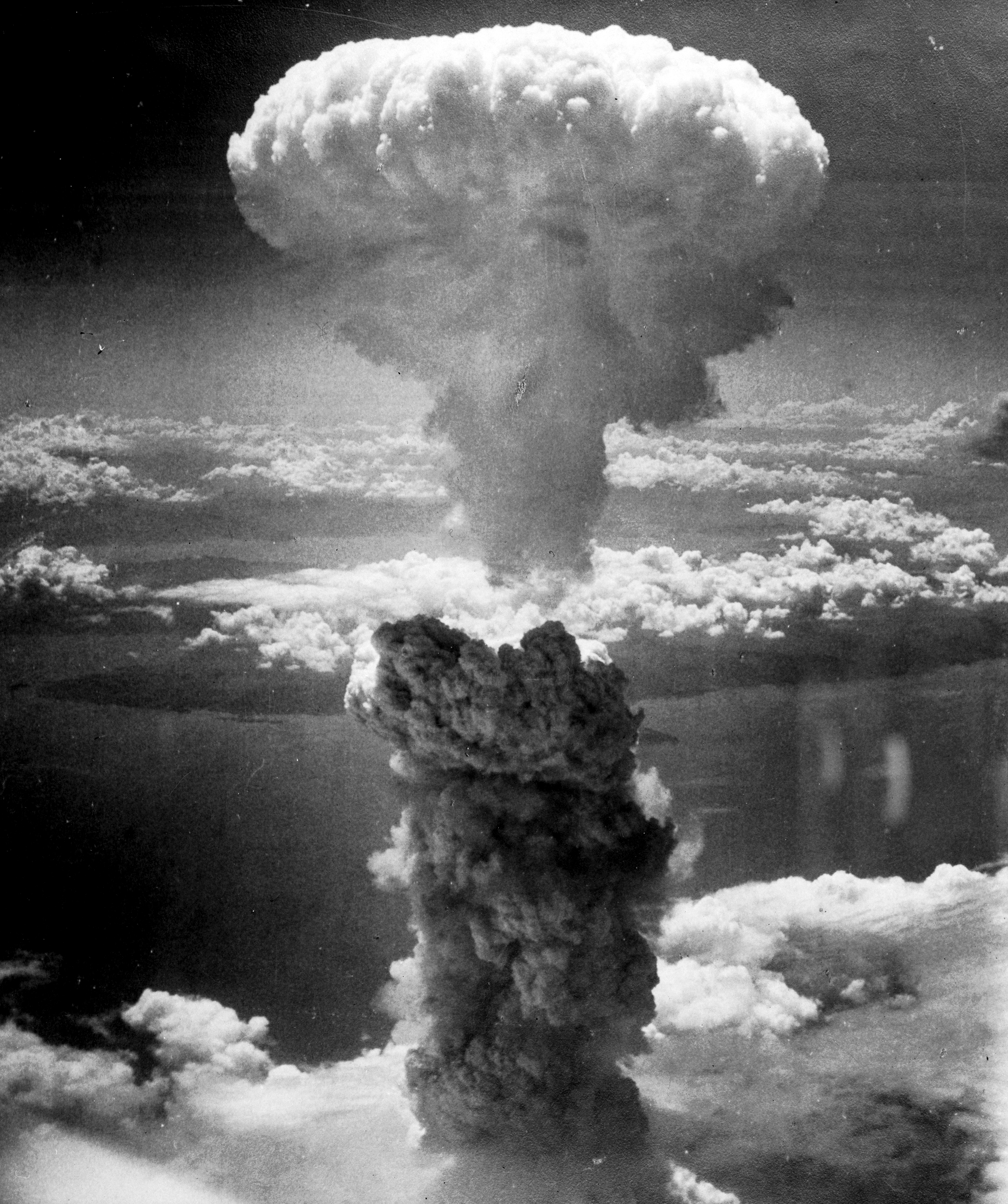
The Frisch–Peierls memorandum is the first document to set out a process by which an atomic explosion could be generated.

1940: The Frisch–Peierls memorandum is finalised by Otto Frisch and Rudolf Peierls while both working at Birmingham University—this is the first document to set out a process by which an atomic explosion could be generated.

1944: Anthony Ernest Pratt takes out his first patent for a board game named 'Murder', this is later to become the world-renowned murder mystery game 'Cluedo'.

1946: Chance Brothers produce the first all-glass syringe with interchangeable barrel and plunger, thereby allowing mass sterilisation of components without the need for matching them.

1947: Dunlop tyres help John Cobb raise the world land speed record to 630 km/h in the Railton Special, which is now displayed in Birmingham's Thinktank museum.

Between 1947 and 1951 Professor Peter Medawar pioneers research on skin graft rejection at Birmingham University, this leads to the discovery of a substance that aids nerves to reunite and the discovery of acquired immunological tolerance, Medawar is awarded the Nobel Prize for Medicine in 1960 for his work during this time.

1950: In February, the first operation in England for 'hole-in-the-heart' (congenital atrial septal defect) is performed at Birmingham Children's Hospital.

Conway Berners-Lee, a mathematician and computer scientist from Birmingham, works in the team that develops the Ferranti Mark 1, the world's first commercial stored program electronic computer. Berners-Lee is demobilized from the British Army in 1947 with the rank of Major. By the late 1960s Berners-Lee leads the Medical Development Team of ICT and then ICL and is involved in some of the earliest developments in the applications of computers in medicine, and his text compression ideas are taken up by an early electronic patient record system. Berners-Lee later marries Mary Lee Woods (also from Birmingham). Woods studies at Birmingham University and later works in the team that develop programs for the Manchester Mark 1, Ferranti Mark 1 and Mark 1 Star computers. In 1955 the Berners-Lees become parents to Tim Berners-Lee, who invents the World Wide Web, making the first proposal for it in March 1989.

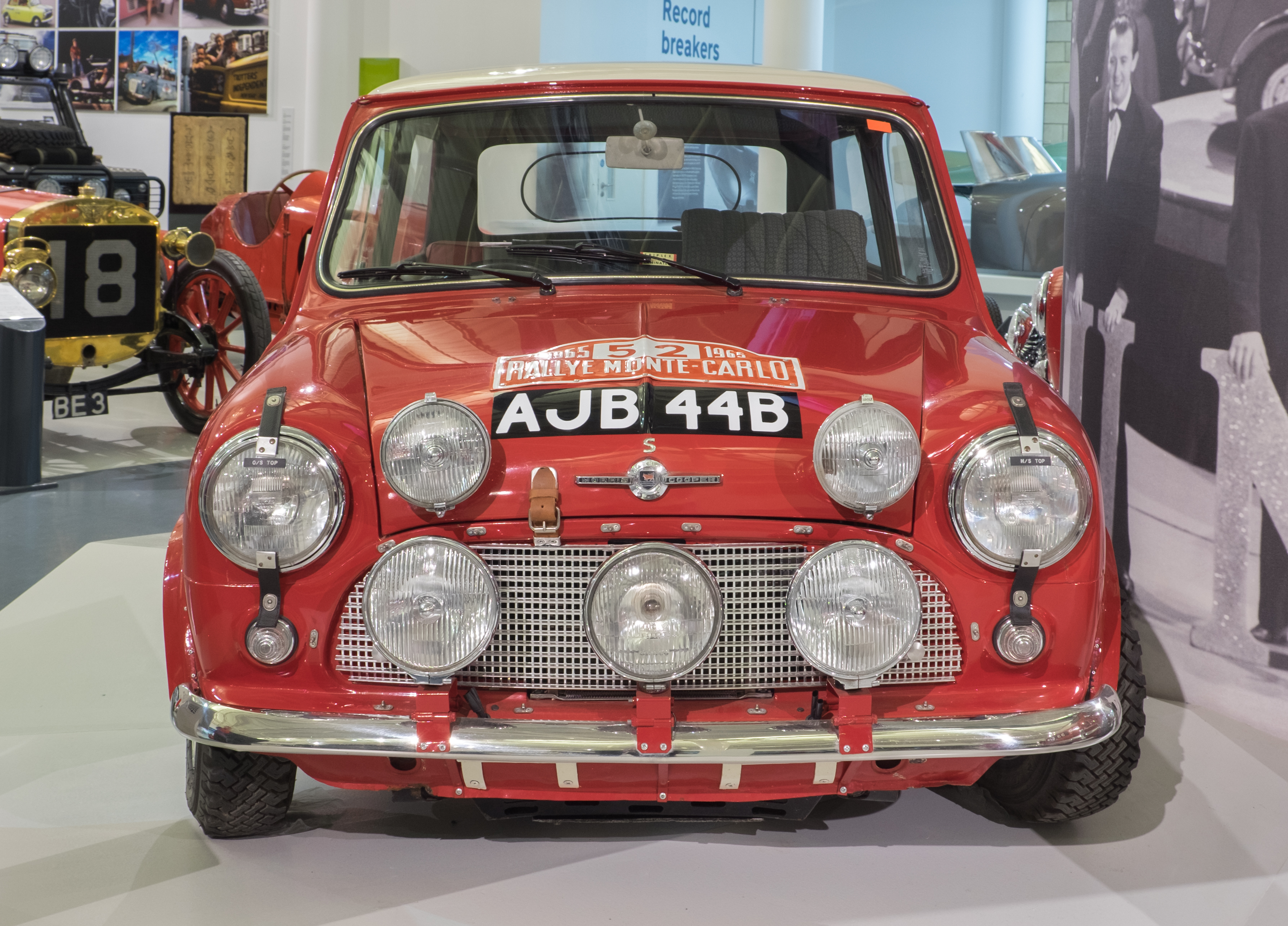
The original Mini is considered a British icon of the 1960s and has since been voted the second most influential car of the 20th century, behind the Ford Model T.

1952: Professor Charlotte Anderson (Leonard Parsons Professor of Paediatrics and Child Health) is one of the team who prove that the glutens in wheat cause coeliac disease, from this gluten-free diets are introduced.

1954: The Stewart platform (a parallel robot) first comes into use. Stewart platforms have applications in machine tool technology, crane technology, underwater research, air-to-sea rescue, satellite dish positioning, telescopes and orthopedic surgery but are better known for flight simulation.

1950–1959: Essential research and development on heart pacemakers and plastic heart valves is carried out by Leon Abrams at Birmingham University.

1959: The Mini car begins production at Birmingham's Longbridge plant. The original is considered a British icon of the 1960s, and its space-saving front-wheel-drive layout (which allowed 80% of the area of the car's floorpan to be used for passengers and luggage) influenced a generation of car makers. In 1999 the Mini was voted the second most influential car of the 20th century, behind the Ford Model T.

The structure of part of a DNA double helix. Birmingham raised and educated, Maurice Wilkins received the Nobel Prize for his work on DNA structure, he is one of three who became known as the Code Breakers.

1962: Maurice Wilkins, New Zealand born and Birmingham raised, receives the Nobel Prize for his work on DNA structure, he is one of three who become known as the Code Breakers. Wilkins is educated at King Edward's School (and St John's College, Cambridge), he receives a PhD for the study of phosphors at the University of Birmingham, where he works on radar display screens and uranium isotope separation before moving to the Manhattan Project.

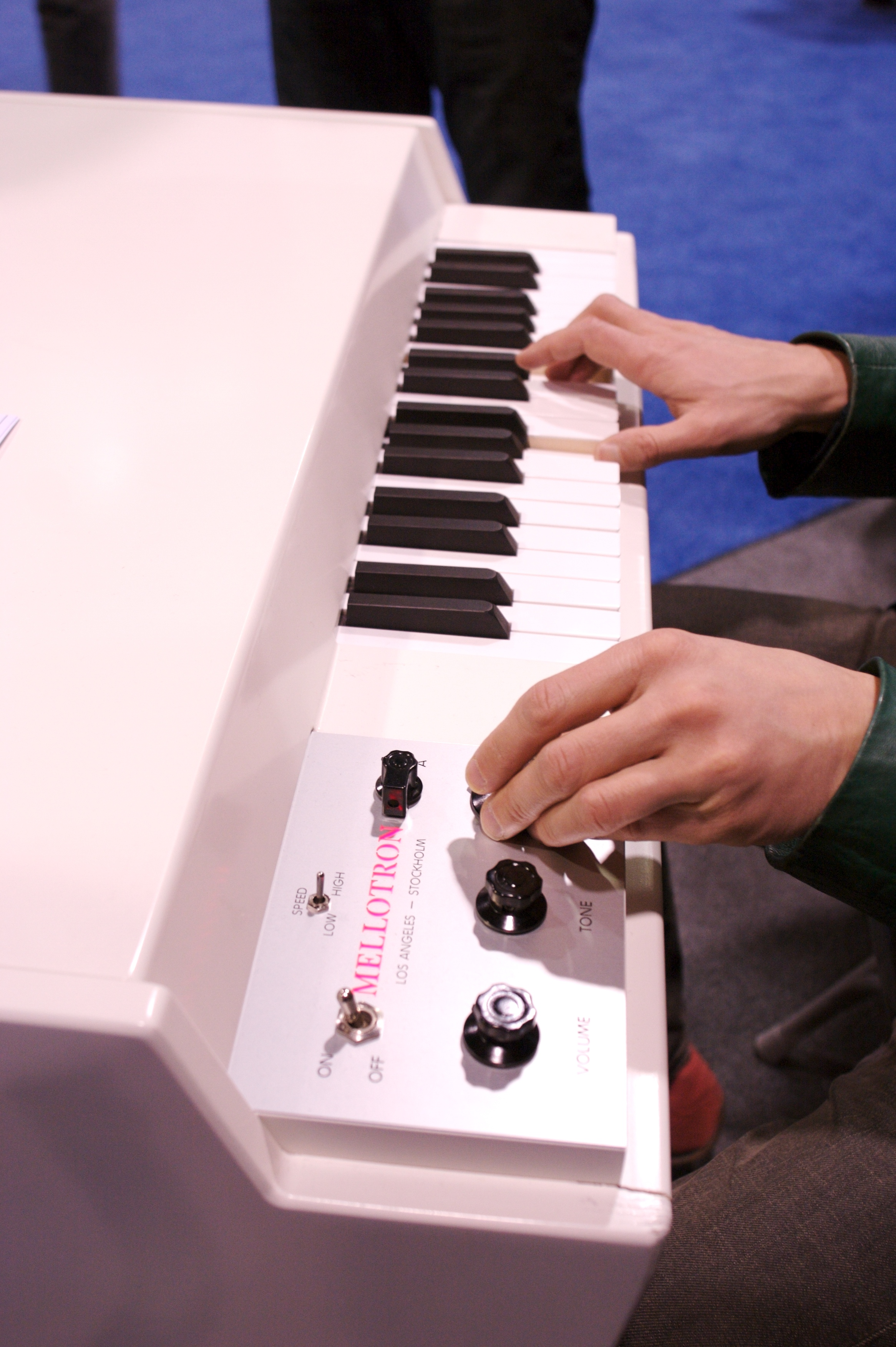
The Birmingham-made Mellotron has played a vital part in popular music since the 1960s, being used by artists such as The Beatles, The Rolling Stones and Led Zeppelin.

1962: Bill Fransen of American company Chamberlins brings two of their musical instruments to England to search for someone who could manufacture 70 matching tape heads for future Chamberlin keyboards. Fransen approaches a UK company that is skilled enough to develop the idea further and a deal is struck with Bradmatic Ltd. The first Mellotron sample keyboards are manufactured in Aston and are to enjoy great longevity in the music industry. Alongside the Hammond organ, the Mellotron later becomes a seminal musical instrument for music genres such as rock and psychedelia, it is also crucial to shaping the sound of the progressive rock and hard rock groups of the 1970s as well as inspiring further development of the sample keyboard, most notably the Fairlight, which, in turn, inspired sample modules such as the Akai Sampler range; synonymous with hip hop and dance music.

Some of the more notable songs that make use of the signature Mellotron sound include Nights In White Satin by The Moody Blues, Tomorrow Never Knows and Strawberry Fields Forever by The Beatles, 2000 Light Years from Home and We Love You by The Rolling Stones, Hole In My Shoe by Traffic, Mercy Mercy Me by Marvin Gaye, Days by The Kinks, Space Oddity by David Bowie, Stairway to Heaven, The Rain Song and Kashmir by Led Zeppelin.

1965: The Birmingham Press and Mail installs the GEC PABX 4 ACD, the earliest example of a call centre in the UK. Already the hallmarks of the call centre can be seen in the rows of agents with individual phone terminals, taking and making calls.

1969–1970: Heavy metal music begins to take shape in Britain and America. Of the earliest influential bands that are later to be described as Heavy Metal, several of the most notable artists arise from the mid to late 1960s Brum Beat music scene, such as: Robert Plant and John Bonham of Led Zeppelin, Ozzy Osbourne, Tony Iommi, Geezer Butler and Bill Ward of Black Sabbath and Rob Halford and Glenn Tipton of Judas Priest.

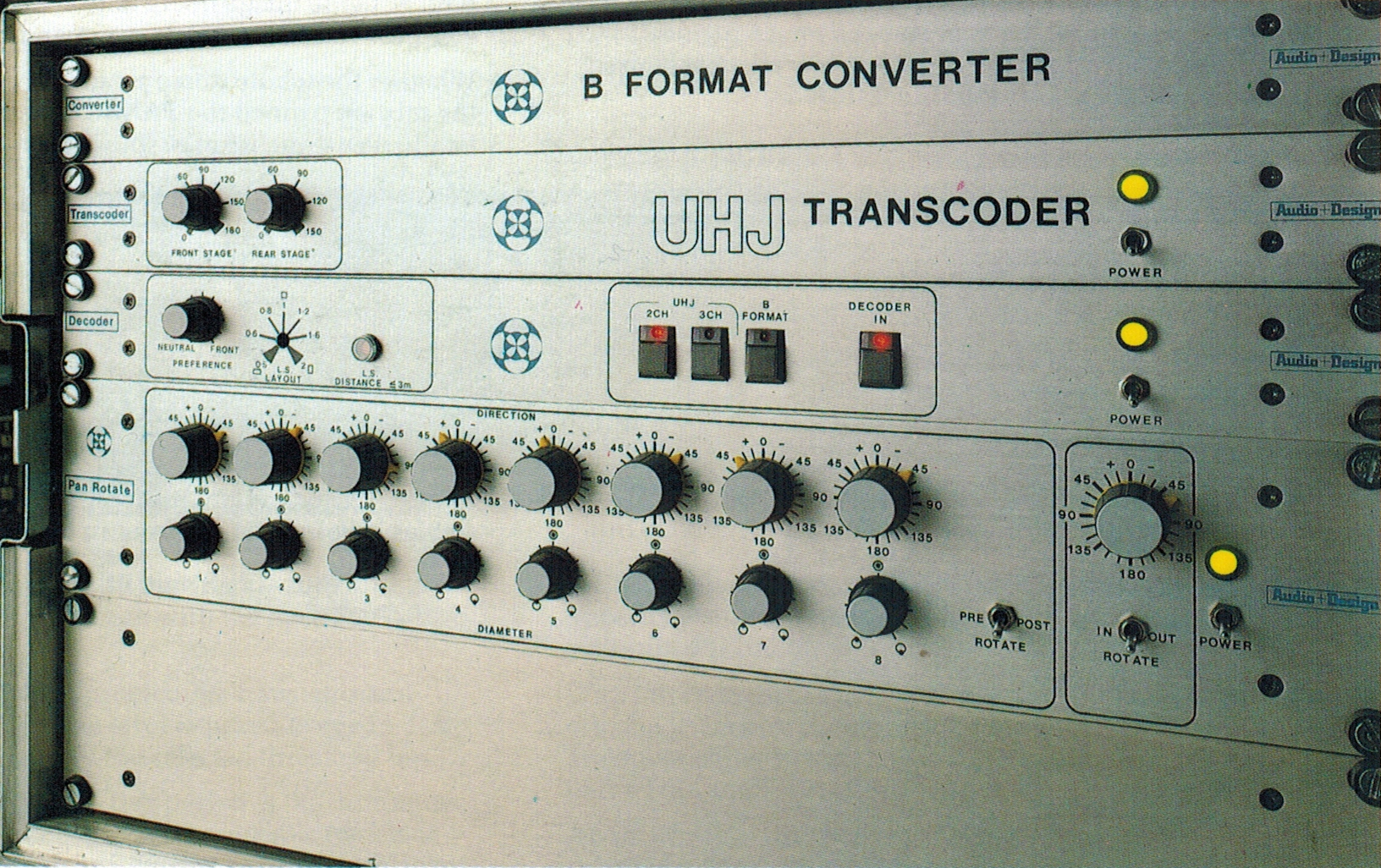
Birmingham inventor Michael Gerzon co-invents the Soundfield microphone and later played a large part in the invention of Ambisonics.

During the later half of the 20th century the first trials of the combined oral contraceptive pill outside the USA take place at Birmingham University and extensive research into advanced allergy vaccines and the synthesis of artificial blood take place.

1975: Birmingham inventor Michael Gerzon co-invents the Soundfield microphone. Gerzon studies at the University of Oxford, and is inspired by Alan Blumlein's landmark 1933 development of stereophonic recording and reproduction. The Soundfield range of microphones are now considered the ultimate microphones for recording both stereophonic and multichannel surround formats.

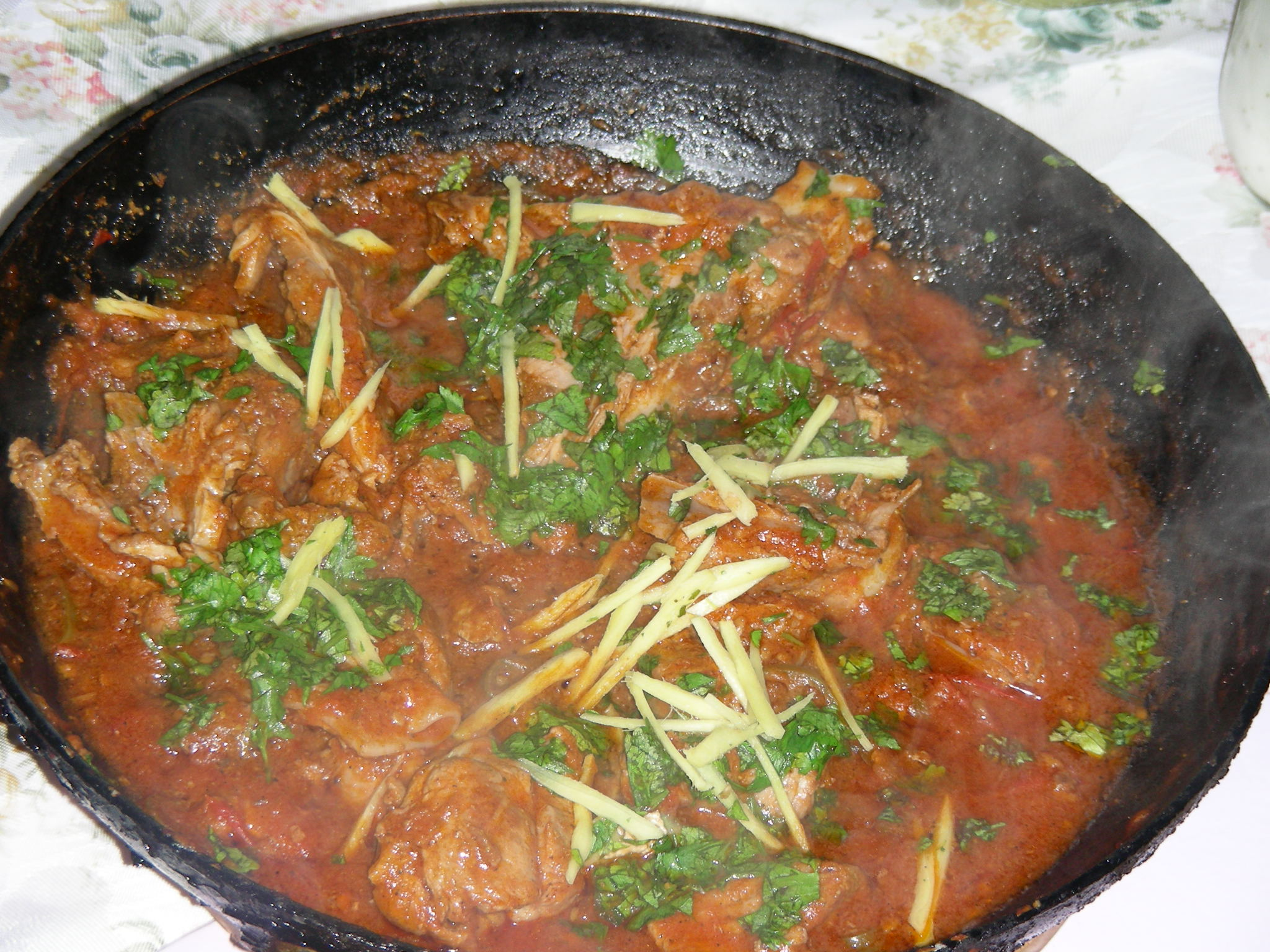
The Balti rose to fame in Birmingham

Gerzon later plays a large role in the invention of Ambisonics, which is a series of recording and replay techniques using multichannel mixing technology that can be used live or in the studio.

Balti cuisine becomes nationally renowned, after initial growth in the city during the late 1980s. Today Balti restaurants are extremely popular throughout Britain and abroad.

Sir John Robert Vane, winner of a Nobel Prize in Physiology or Medicine in 1982 for his work on aspirin, is educated at King Edward's School and studies Chemistry at the University of Birmingham.

1991: Derek McMinn begins the first successful modern metal-on-metal hip resurfacing operations and the instrumentation and surgical technique to implant it.

== 21st century ==
The University of Birmingham has become one of the significant UK research centres for nanotechnology.

As of 2013, Aston University was also carrying out research, including a micro-robotic drill for use in surgery, and the use of fibre optics instead of electric sensors in aircraft fuel tanks.

== See also ==
- Industrial Revolution
- Scientific Revolution
- Chemical revolution
- Jewellery Quarter
- Gun Quarter
- Birmingham pen trade
- Textile manufacture during the Industrial Revolution
- History of Birmingham
- History of trade and industry in Birmingham
