= Artillery of France in the Middle Ages =

Developments in French artillery

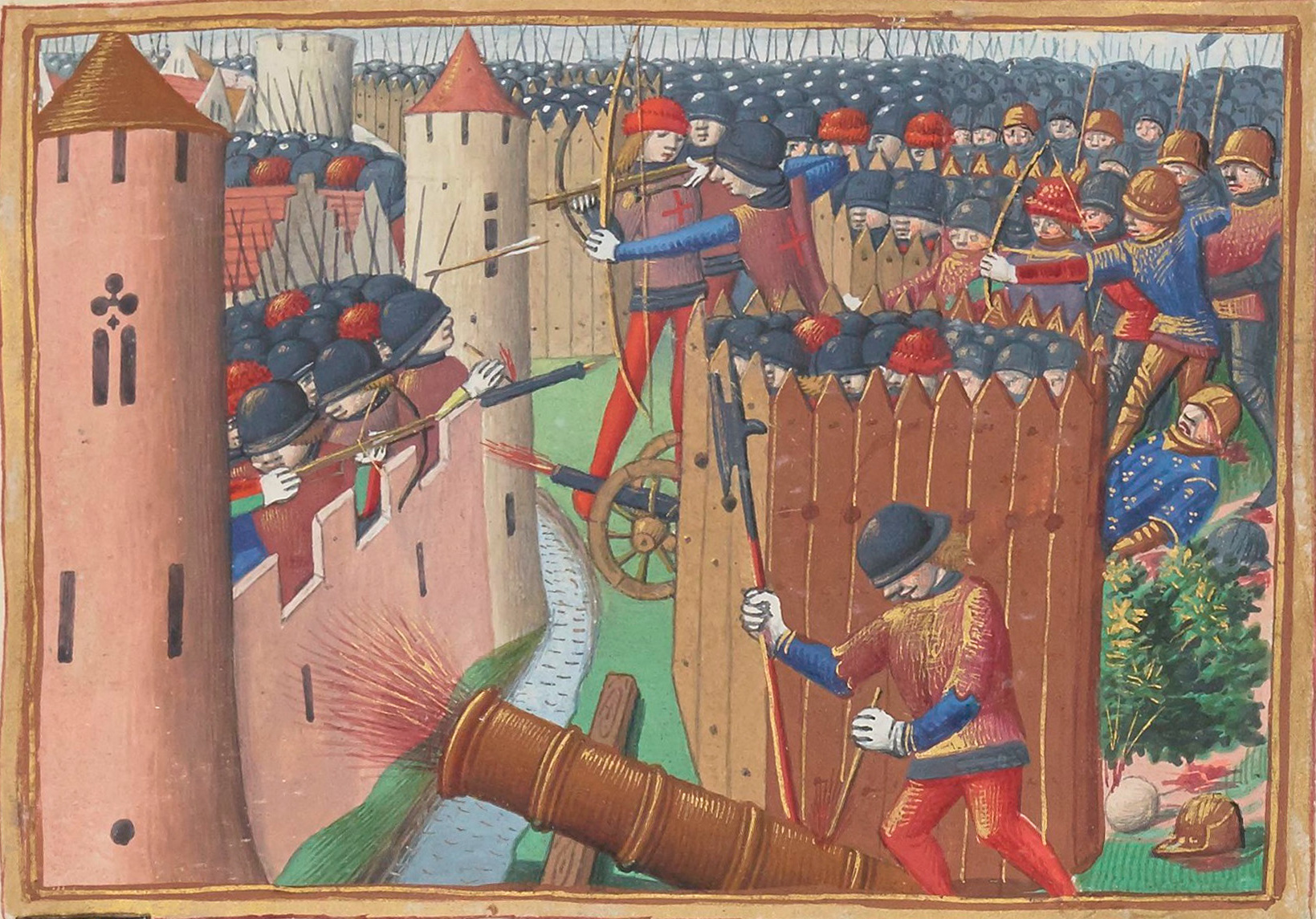
Depiction of artillery in a 1490s illustration of the Siege of Orléans of 1429

Artillery began to be used in France in the 14th century. The first depiction of a cannon in Europe appeared in Walter de Milemete's 1326 De nobilitatibus, sapientiis, et prudentiis regum. Small rudimentary weapons such as the pot-de-fer or the portable bâton à feu were introduced. At this early stage, cannon would fire either stone balls or metal pellets.

== 14th-century developments ==
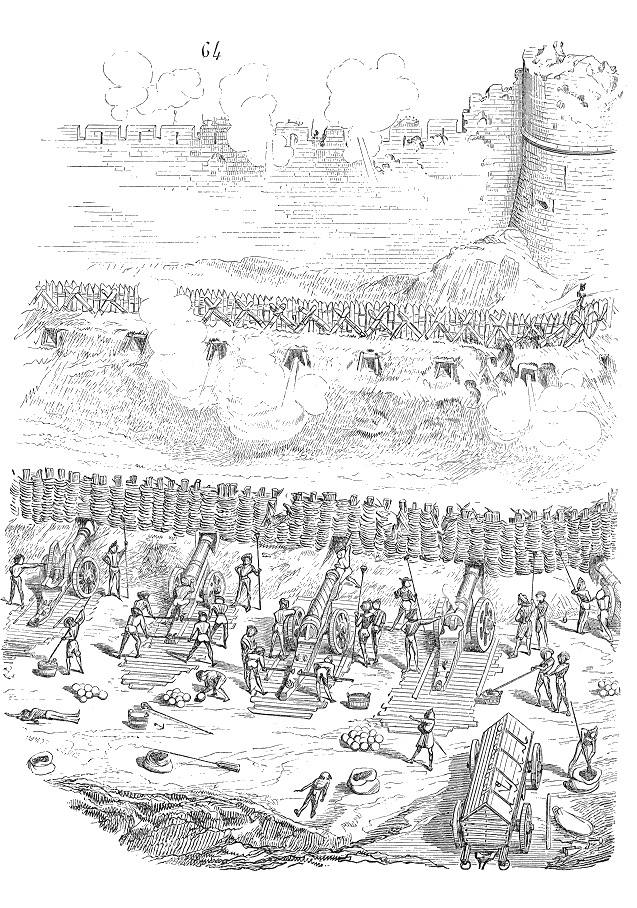
Eugène Viollet-le-Duc's impression of late medieval artillery in action (1856)

The 14th century saw considerable development of the new weapons in France and in Western Europe in general, especially with the outbreak of the Hundred Years' War (1337–1453).

Cannons were soon used at sea, with ships being used as a firing platform. Small guns projecting quarrels or lead pellets were used at the 1340 Battle of Sluys, and in the French defence of Tournai in August 1340.

Edward III used similar weapons at the Battle of Crécy in 1346, and in the Siege of Calais in 1347. "Ribaldis" were first mentioned in the English Privy Wardrobe accounts during preparations for the Battle of Crécy between 1345 and 1346.

Cannons evolved considerably towards the end of the century with the collapse of the Treaty of Brétigny and the resumption of the war in 1369. Until 1370, cannons were essentially small weapons of 10 to 20 kg (20 to 40 lbs), made of brass or copper. After that point, larger guns appeared, made of wrought iron or cast iron. During the 1375 siege of Saint-Sauveur-le-Vicomte, French troops successfully breached the walls of the fortress with guns weighing over 1 ton, and firing 50 kg stone balls. The English trailed behind French developments in the area and only had a few such weapons before 1400.

By the end of the century, new firearm types appeared, such as a variety of hand guns, small mortars and ribaudequins. These complemented, but did not replace, heavier artillery.

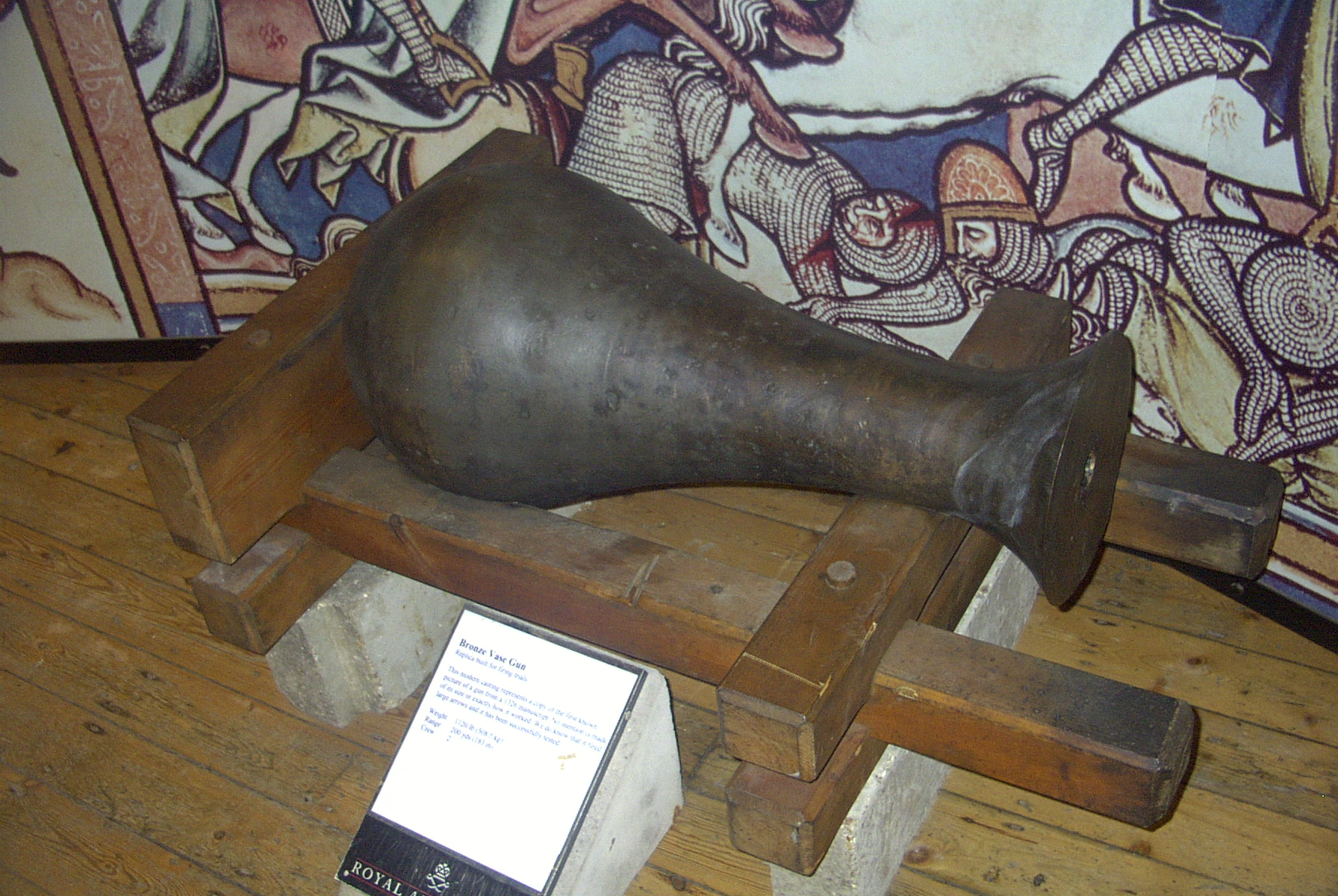
Reconstitution of a pot-de-fer, described in 1326 by Walter de Milemete.

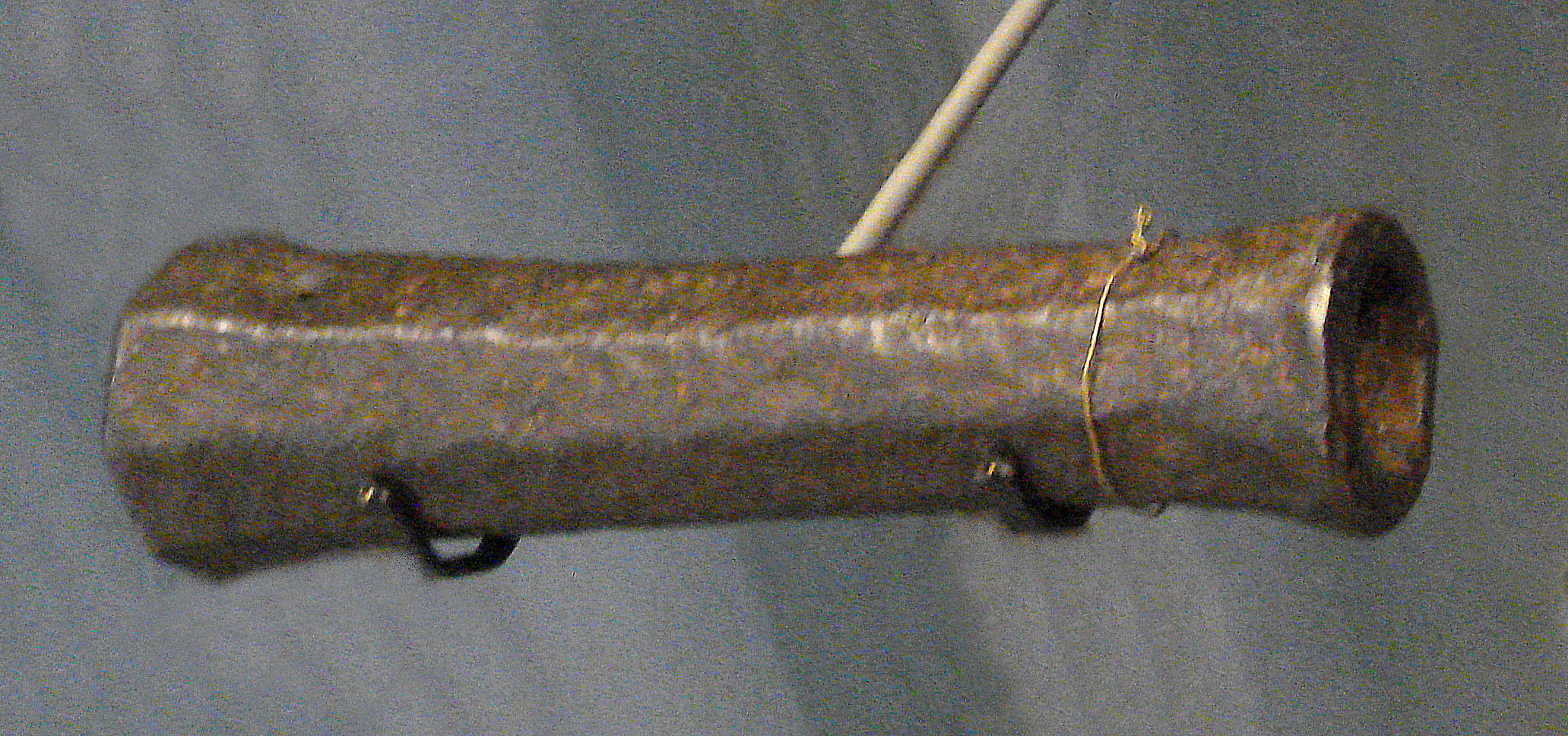
Bâton à feu, or hand bombard (1380). Musée de l'Armée.

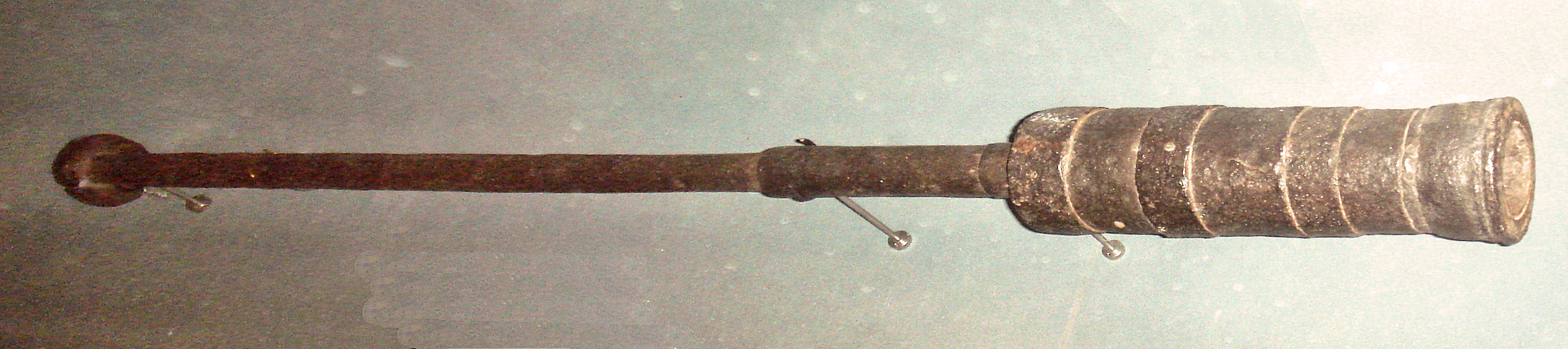
A bâton à feu with its wooden pole, France, 1390-1400.

== 15th-century developments ==
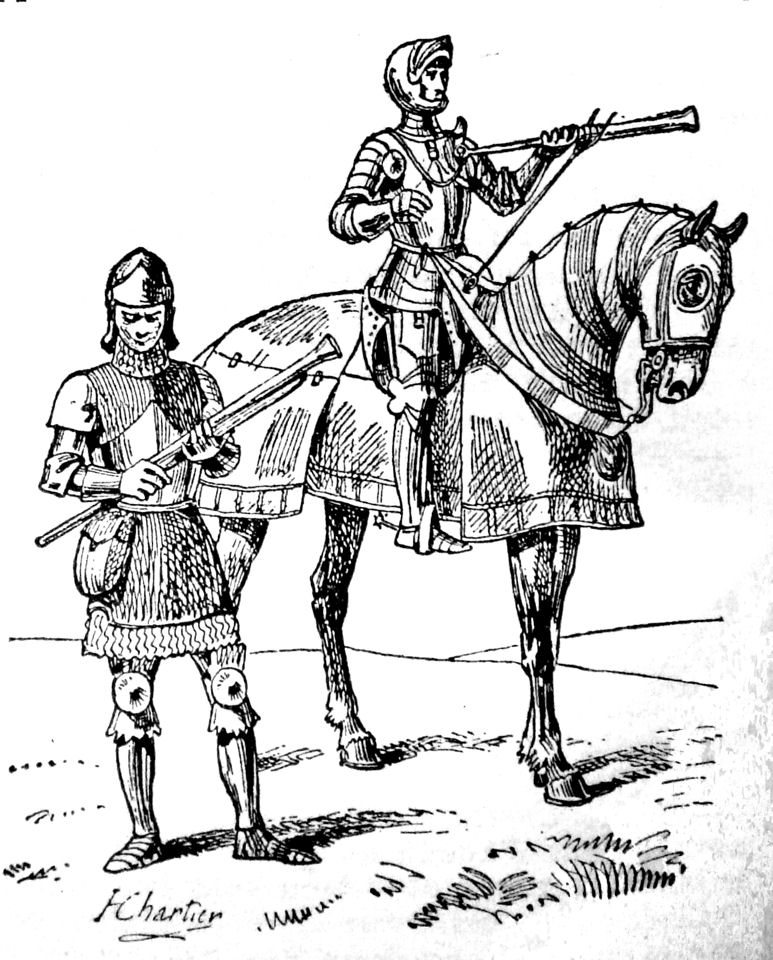
15th-century culveriners.

By the early 15th century, both armies had a wide variety of gunpowder weapons. Large guns were developed, known as bombards (French bombardes), weighing up to 3 tonnes and firing stone balls of up to 150 kg (300 lbs), which seem to have been more prevalent among the French than among the English until 1420. Such bombards were often made by welding bars of wrought iron together and holding them inside circular bracelets, a process known as "à tonoille", similar to that involving the manufacture of wine barrels (tonneaux).

Veuglaires (English "fowlers") were developed, up to 2 meters (8 feet) long, and weighing from 150 kg to several tonnes, while the crapaudins or crapaudaux were shorter (4 to 8 feet) and lighter than the veuglaires.

The first Western image of a battle with cannon goes back to the Siege of Orléans in 1429, in which both the English and the French side are depicted with firearms. French cannon killed the English commander Thomas Montagu in 1428. Joan of Arc used cannon effectively during the Loire campaign in 1429.

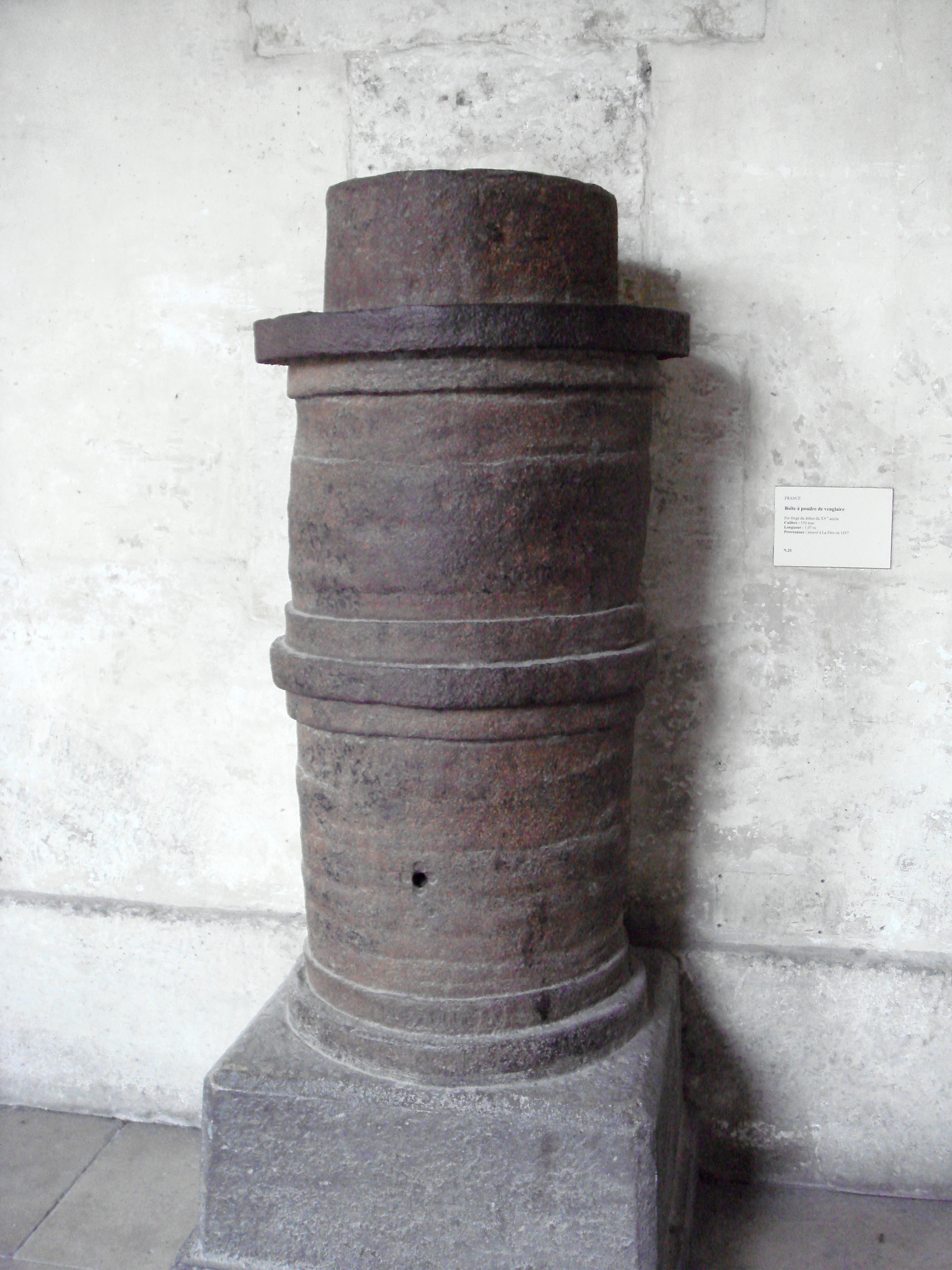
Powder chamber of a Veuglaire, caliber 130mm, length 1.07m, wrought iron, early 15th century, La Fère

Portable hand cannons, the ancestors of modern firearms, continued to be used on a wide scale, sometimes even by mounted soldiers. Small portable arms were also developed such as serpentines and couleuvrines. They were not able, however, to replace the widespread longbows or crossbows during the Hundred Years' War. In contrast, cannon took on a major role in siege warfare, where they came to replace traditional wooden siege engines of the types used since antiquity.

From the 1430s, the artillery of Charles VII was managed by Master Gunner Jean Bureau. Artillery was key to the French successes at Meaux (1439), Pontoise (1441), BCaen and during the Norman Campaign (1449–1450). French artillery was used with great efficiency at the 1453 Battle of Castillon, in which grouped and entrenched cannons decimated the English army, killing the commander John Talbot.

Artillery also started to affect military architecture, leading to the development of lower, thicker walls in order to better resist the effect of cannonballs.

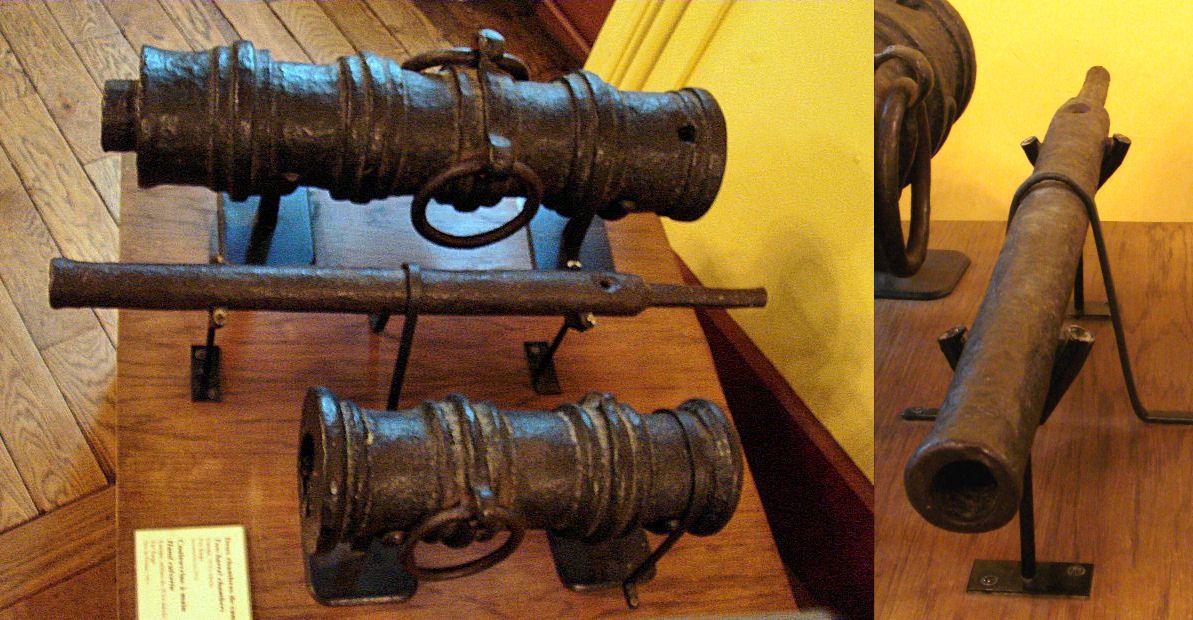
Small cannons and hand culverin, 15th century. Musée de Cluny.

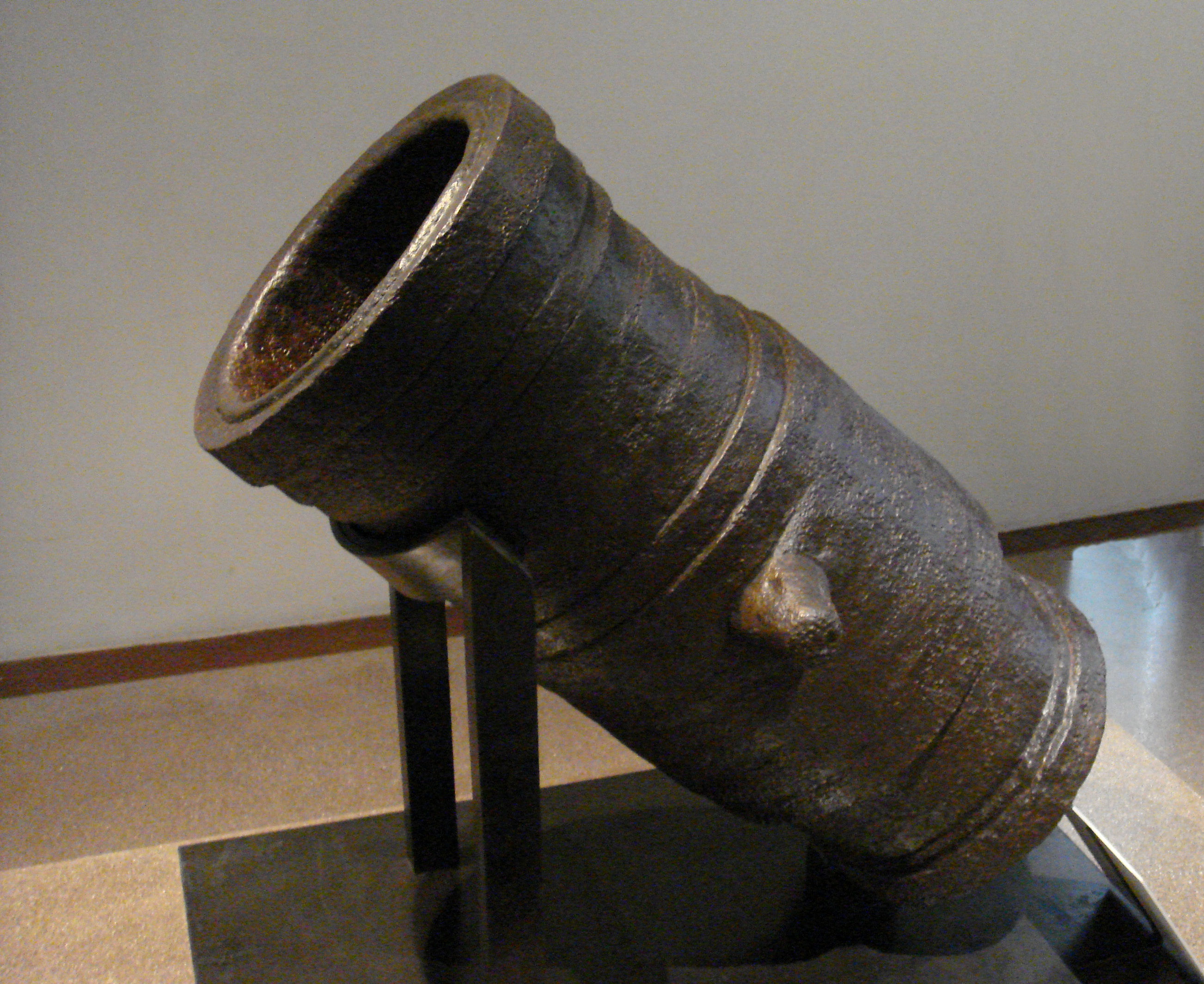
Bombarde-Mortier, La Fère, wrought iron, the second half of the 15th century. Length: 1m, caliber:35cm, weight: 600kg. In this weapon, the powder chamber was cast from molten metal, while the barrel was constructed "à tonoille".

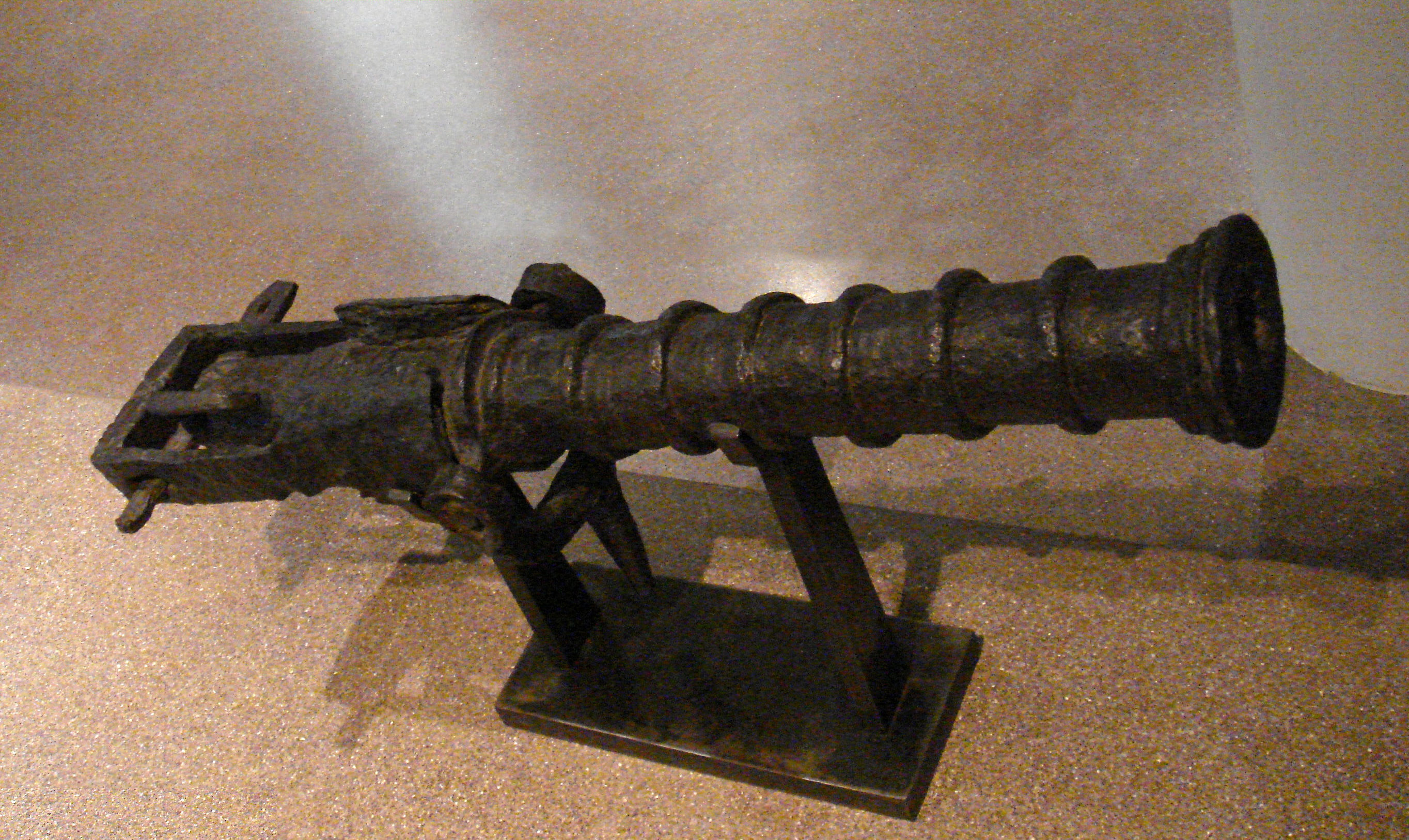
"Perrier à boîte" in wrought iron, 1410. Length: 72cm, caliber: 38mm, weight: 41.190kg. This is a breech-loading swivel gun.

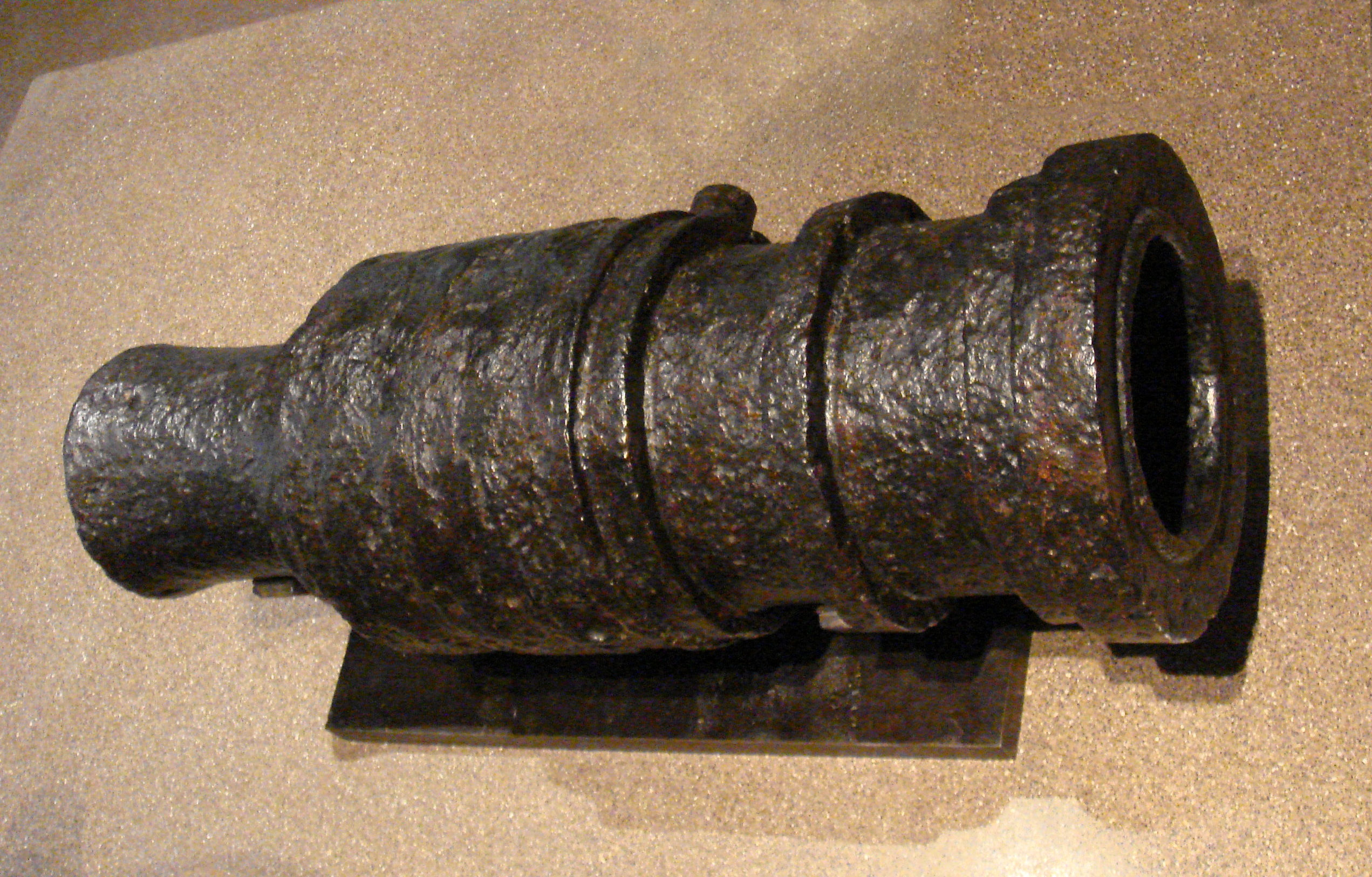
Small wrought iron bombard, Metz, circa 1450. Length: 0.82m, caliber: 175mm, weight: 200kg, ammunition: 6kg stone.

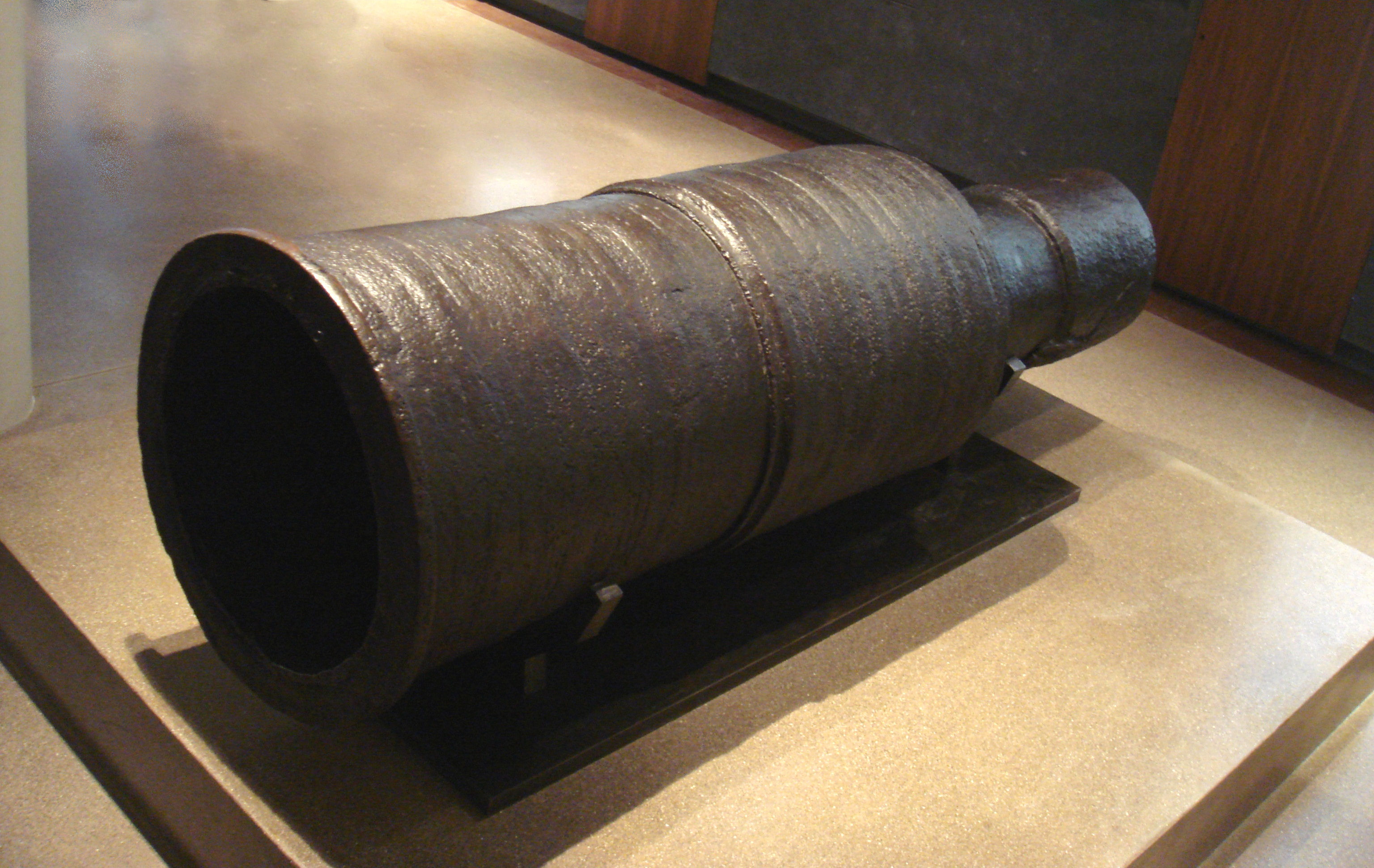
Wrought iron bombard, circa 1450, La Chapelle-aux-Naux, near Langeais. Length: 2m, caliber: 486mm, weight: 1,500kg, ammunition: 130kg stone ball, range: 100-200m.

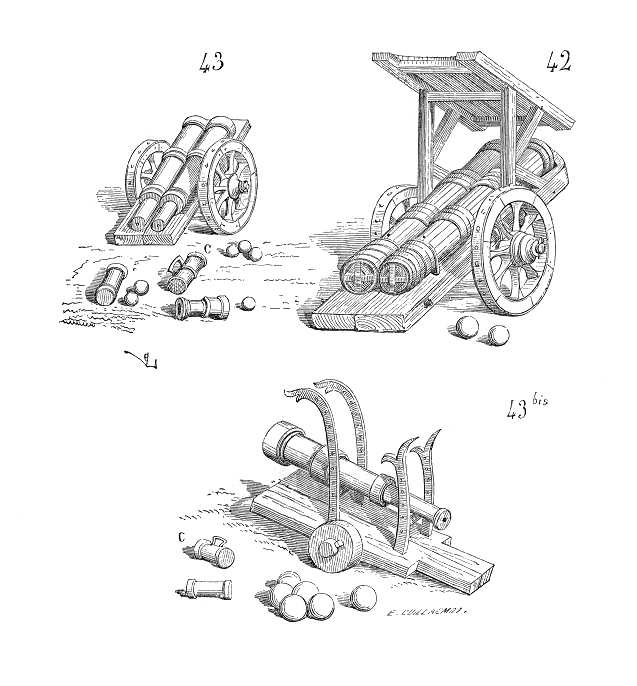
Various pieces of medieval artillery from Eugène Viollet-le-Duc's Dictionnaire raisonné de l'architecture française du XIe au XVIe siècle (1856).
