= Pierrier à boîte =

Early type of small cannon

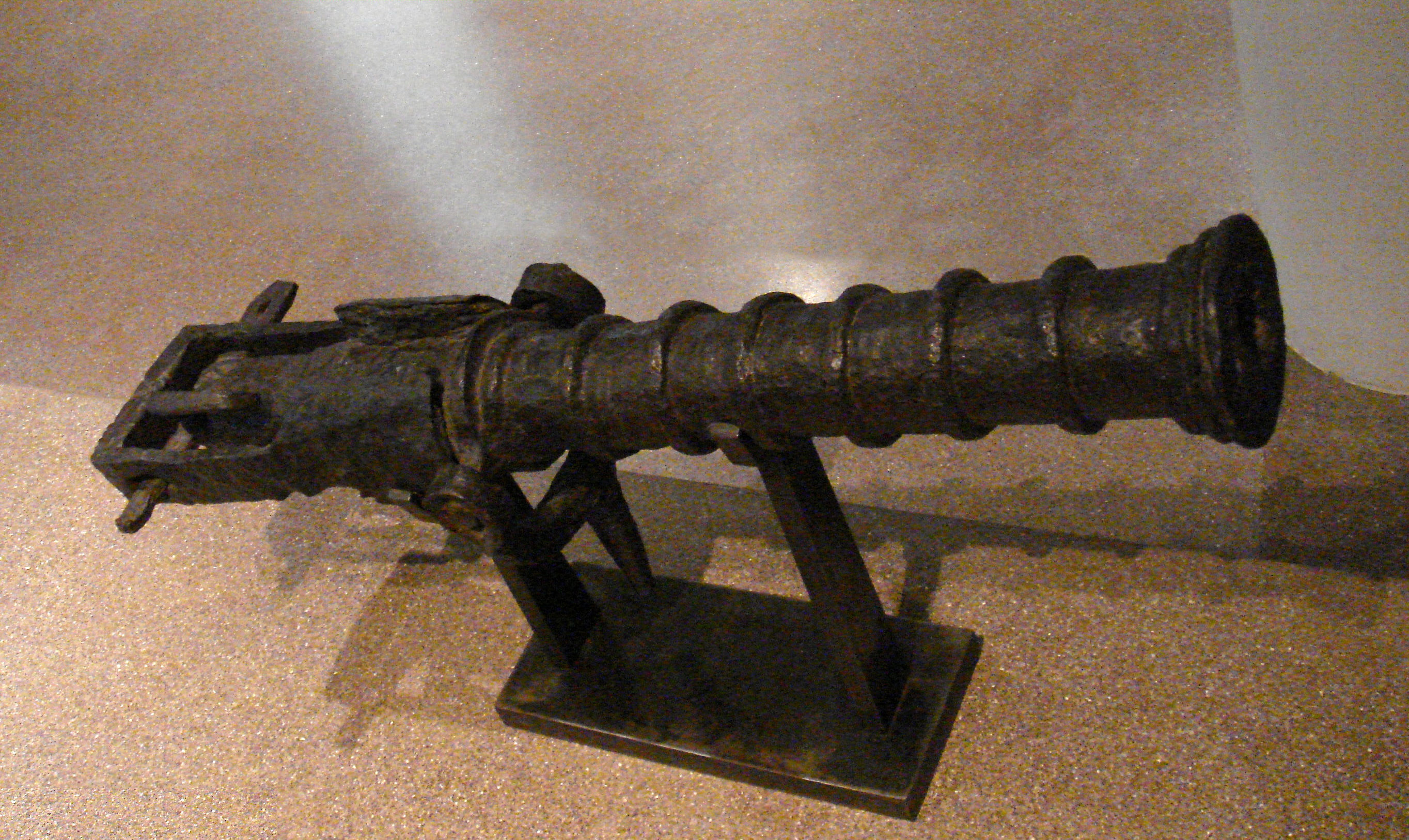
- Pierrier à boîte (1410). Musée de l'Armée.
- Type: Cannon
- Place of origin: Western Europe

Service history
- In service: 1410-
- Used by: Western European countries
- Wars: Hundred Years War

Production history
- Designer: Unknown
- Designed: 15th century
- Produced: 15th century-
- No. built: ?

Specifications
- Mass: 41.19 kilograms (90.8 lb)
- Length: 72 centimetres (28 in)
- Caliber: 38 mm
- Effective firing range: ?

A Pierrier à boîte was an early type of small wrought iron cannon developed in the early 15th century, and a type of breech-loading swivel gun. It was part of the artillery of France in the Middle Ages, and the artillery of the Middle Ages in general. Perrier is the historical term in English for such weapons, literally a stone thrower}.

The pierrier was a breech-loading weapon, using a powder chamber similar to a beer mug for loading of individual shots, without having to load from the front or lose time ramming charges in.

The pierrier allowed for extremely fast loading and firing, as it expended charges prepared in advance. On the downside, it leaked easily, leading to loss of power and safety issues for the gunners.

The pierrier was often used with a swivel. It was a weapon of choice on warships for intense and close encounters. It remained in use until the 19th century.

Note: it should not be confused with the 18th-century pierrier as described in the Encyclopédie of Diderot, which was a thin-walled wide-mouthed stone-throwing mortar (see the lower image in his Pl. X).

== Gallery ==
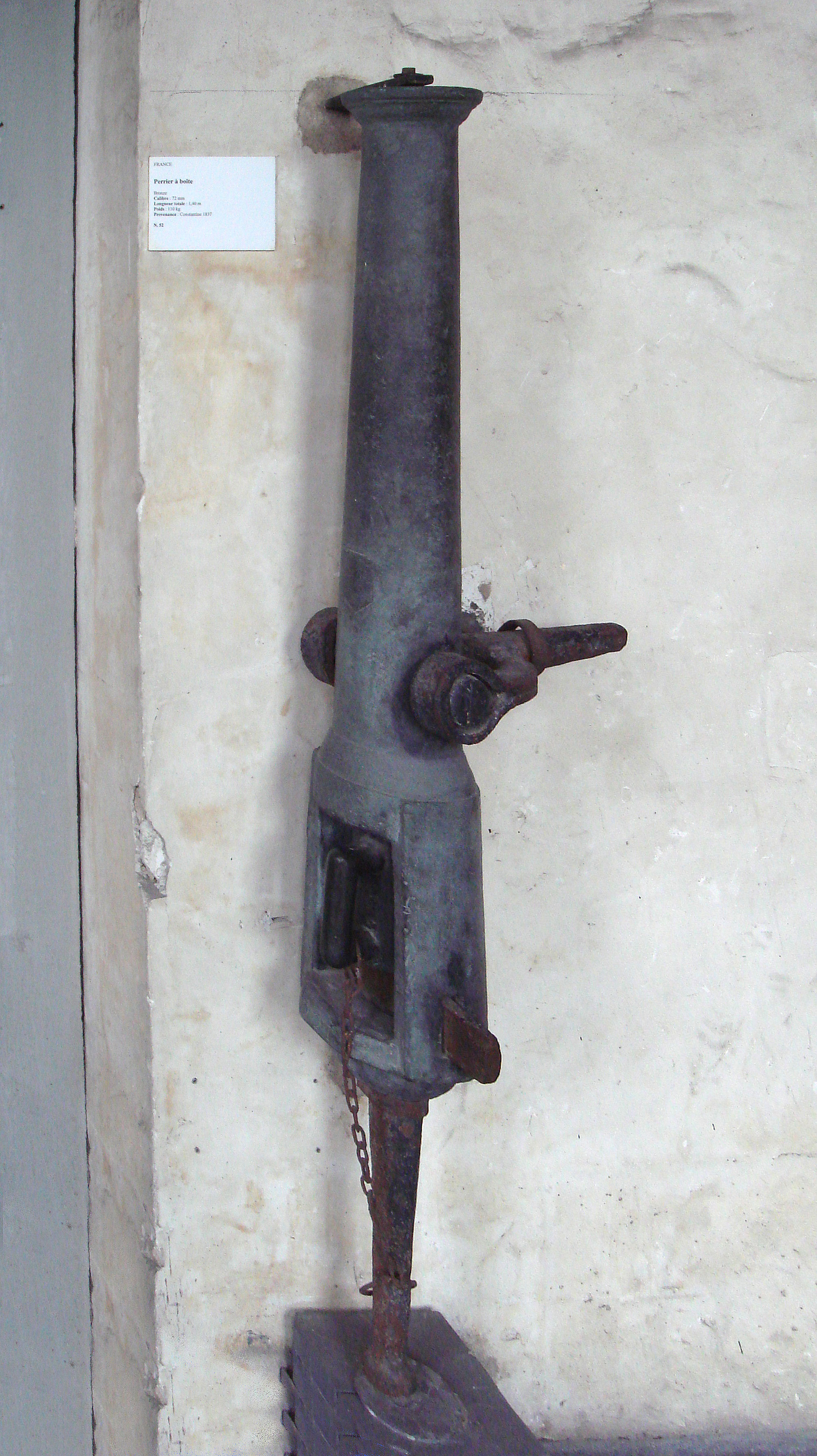
Pierrier à boîte, cal 72 mm, length 140 cm, weight 110 kg, seized in Constantine in 1837.

== See also ==
- Artillery of France in the Middle Ages
- Veuglaire
