= Veuglaire =

Wrought iron cannon part of the artillery of France in the Middle Ages

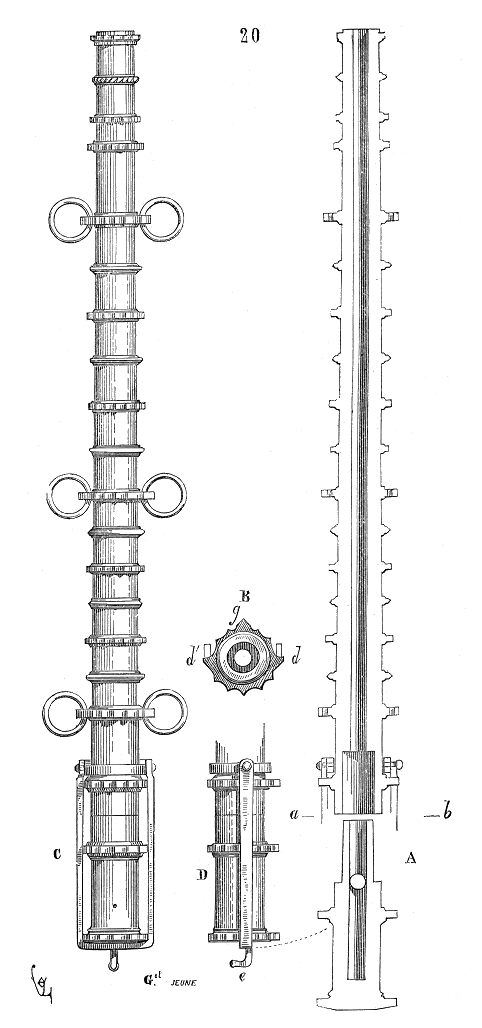
A 14th-century Veuglaire, formed of a powder chamber and a tube.

The Veuglaire (derived from the German Vogler and Vogelfänger, and the Flemish Vogheler, after a gun manufacturer named Vögler. English: Fowler) was a wrought iron cannon, and part of the artillery of France in the Middle Ages. There, guns were initially called acquéraux, sarres or spiroles.

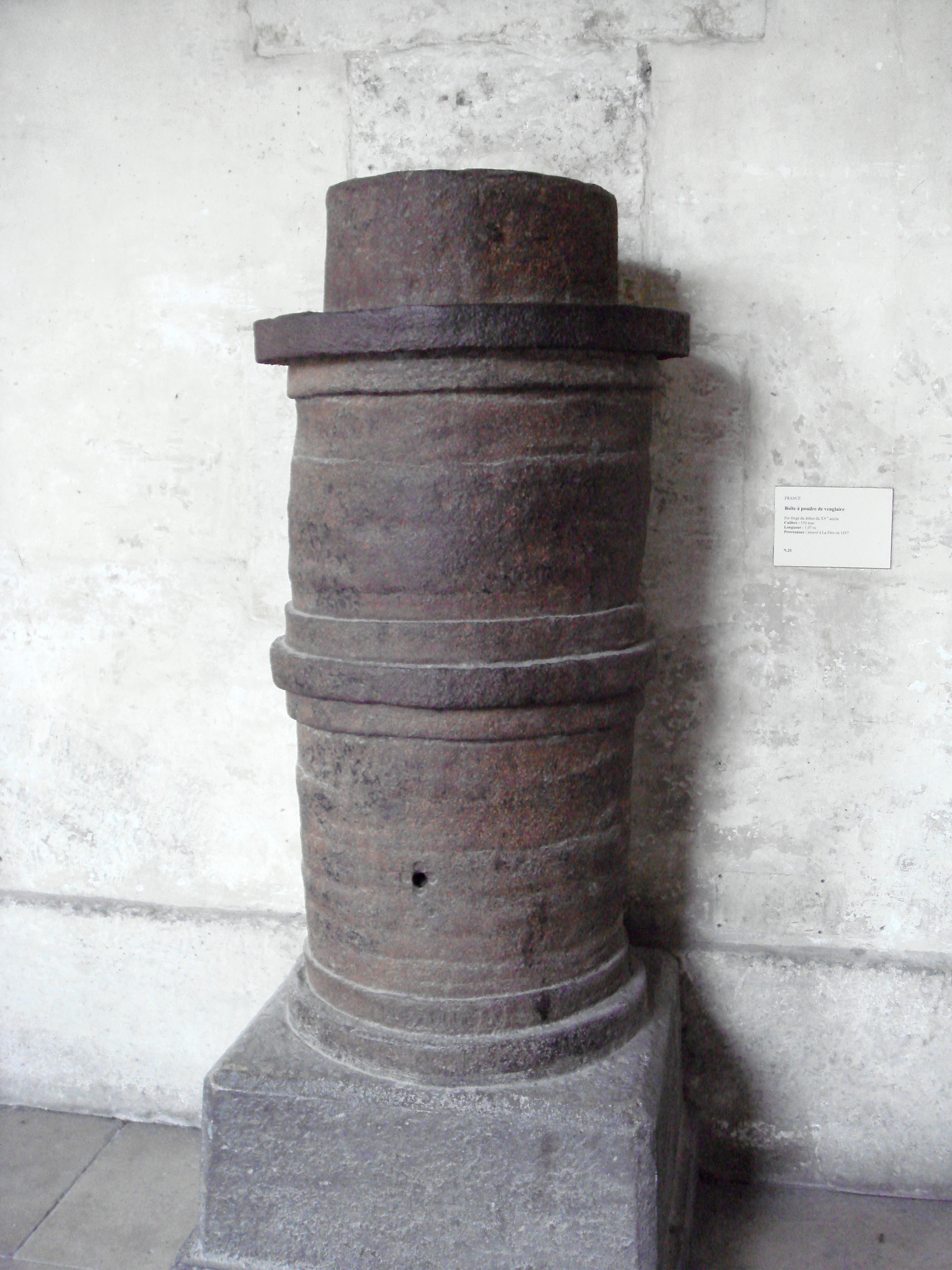
Powder chamber of a Veuglaire, caliber 130 mm, length 1.07 m, wrought iron, early 15th century, La Fère. Musée de l'Armée, Paris.

The Veuglaire was up to 2 meters (8 feet) long, and weighing from 150 kg to several tonnes, and compares to the Crapaudins or Crapaudaux, which were shorter (4 to 8 feet) and lighter than the Veuglaires. The Veuglaires were usually breech-loading, and therefore used a separate "powder chamber" (boîte à poudre) in which powder and ball were located upon loading, and the main body of the cannon was formed of a tube opened at both ends.

Veuglaires, together with Crapaudins, were considered medium-sized weapons and tended to have smaller chambers than bombards. They belonged to a category of weapons developed from the late 14th century, which had smaller bore and flatter trajectory. The category includes the culverin, curtall, serpentines, falcon and arquebus.

== See also ==
- Artillery of France in the Middle Ages
