= Bâton à feu =

Bâton à feu.
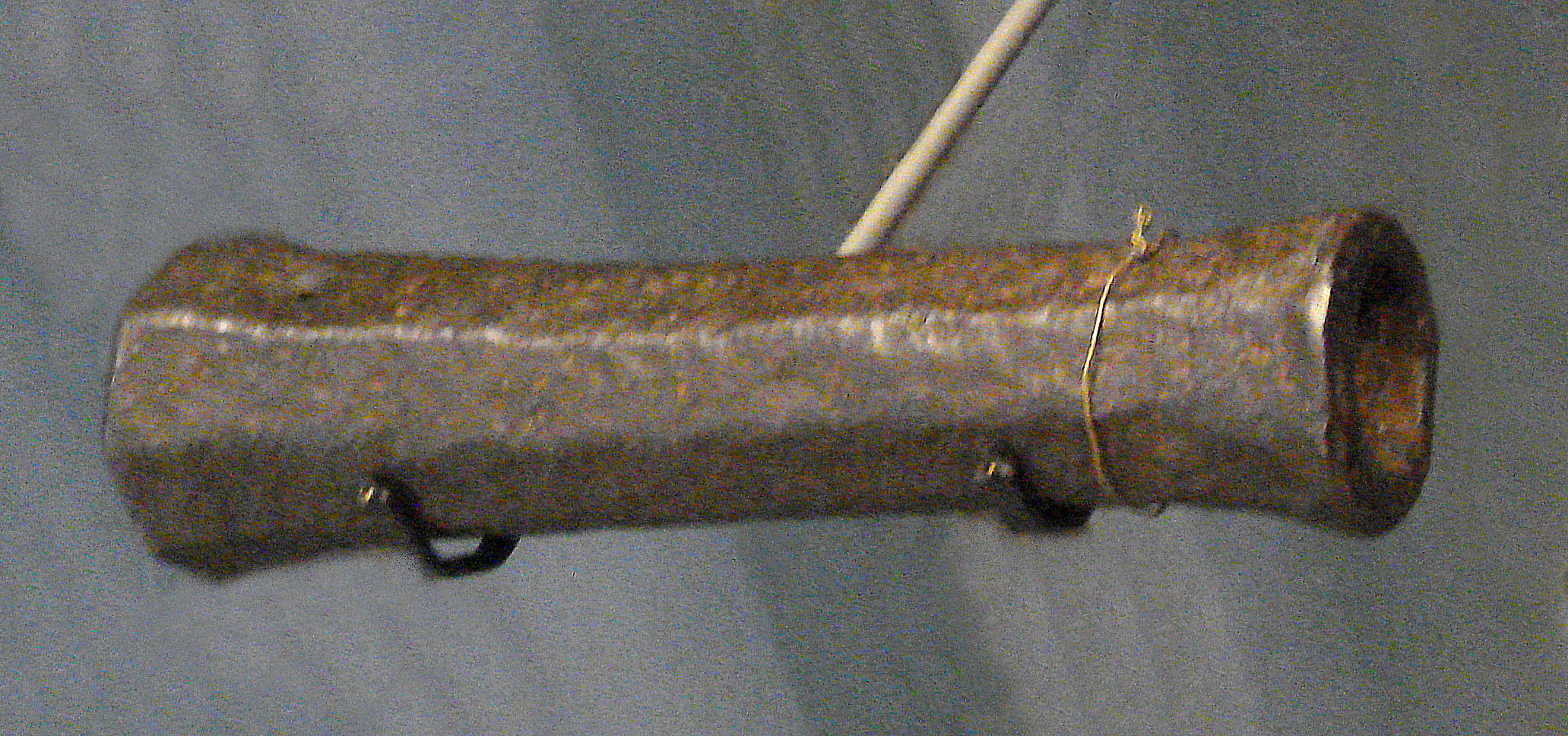
- Bâton à feu (1380). Musée de l'Armée.
- Type: Hand artillery
- Place of origin: Western Europe

Service history
- In service: 1380-1400?
- Used by: Western European countries
- Wars: Hundred Years War

Production history
- Designer: Unknown
- Designed: 13th century
- Produced: 14th century
- No. built: ?

Specifications
- Mass: 1.04kg
- Barrel length: 18 cm
- Caliber: 2 cm
- Effective firing range: ?

The Bâton à feu, or Baston à feu (French for "Fire stick"), is a type of hand cannon developed in the 14th century in Western Europe. This weapon type corresponds to the portable artillery of the second half of 14th century.

The Bâton à feu at the Musée de l'Armée in Paris has an hexagonal cross-section, and looks like a steel tube. It weighs 1.04 kg, and has a length of 18 cm. Its caliber is 2 cm.

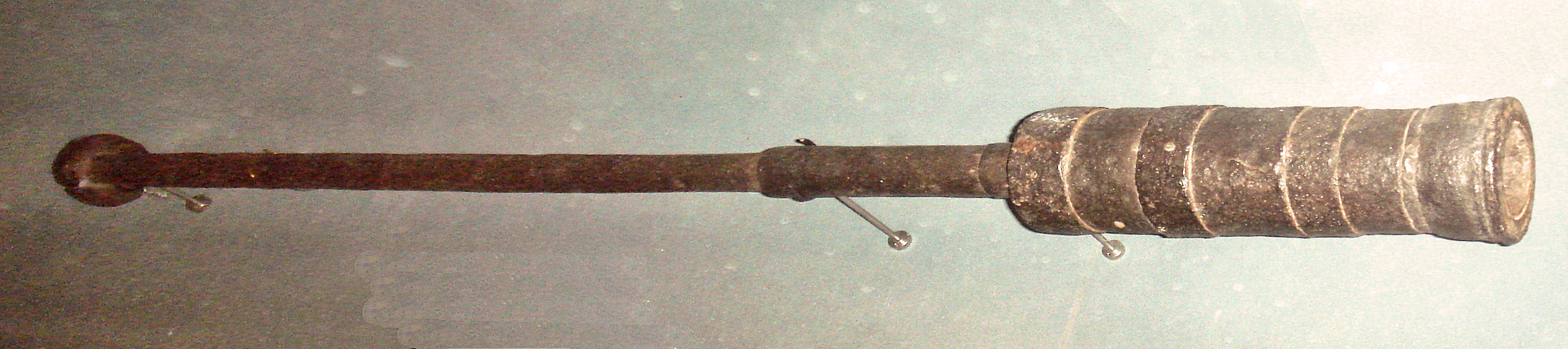
A Bâton à feu or "Hand bombard" with its wooden pole, France, 1390–1400.

In order to facilitate handling, the metal piece was placed at the end of a wooden pole. The powder was ignited through a small hole at the top, with a red-hot steel stick.

== See also ==
- Hand cannon
