= Breech-loading swivel gun =

Small cannon with rear loading chamber

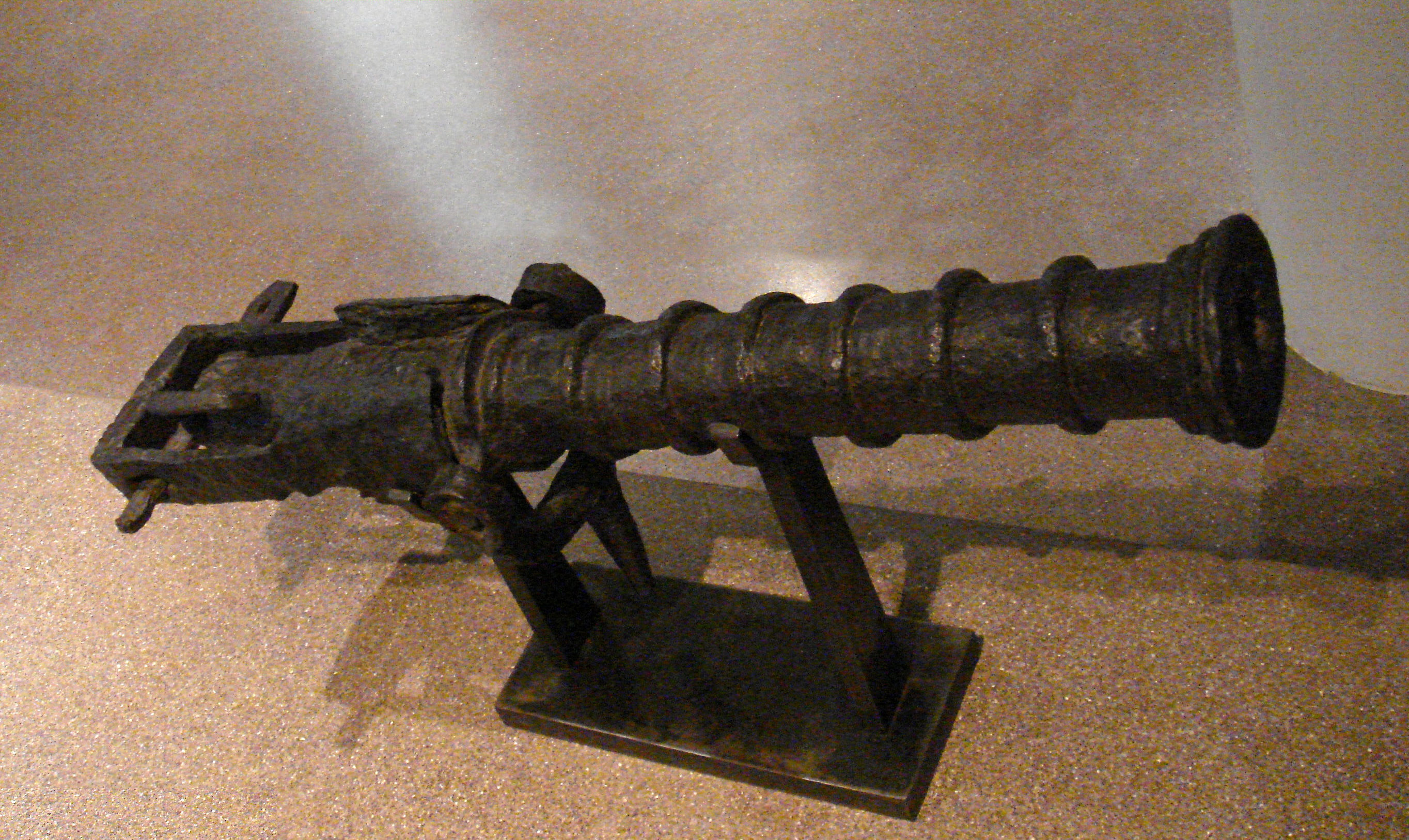
A breech-loading swivel gun, called a "Pierrier à boîte" in French, in wrought iron, 1410. Length: 72 cm, caliber: 38 mm, weight: 41.190 kg.

A breech-loading swivel gun was a particular type of swivel gun and a small breech-loading cannon invented in the 14th century. It was equipped with a swivel for easy rotation and was loaded by inserting a mug-shaped device called a chamber or breech block, filled with gunpowder and projectiles. It had a high rate of fire, as several chambers could be prepared in advance and quickly fired in succession and was especially effective in anti-personnel roles. It was used for centuries by many countries of Europe, Asia and Africa.

== Characteristics ==
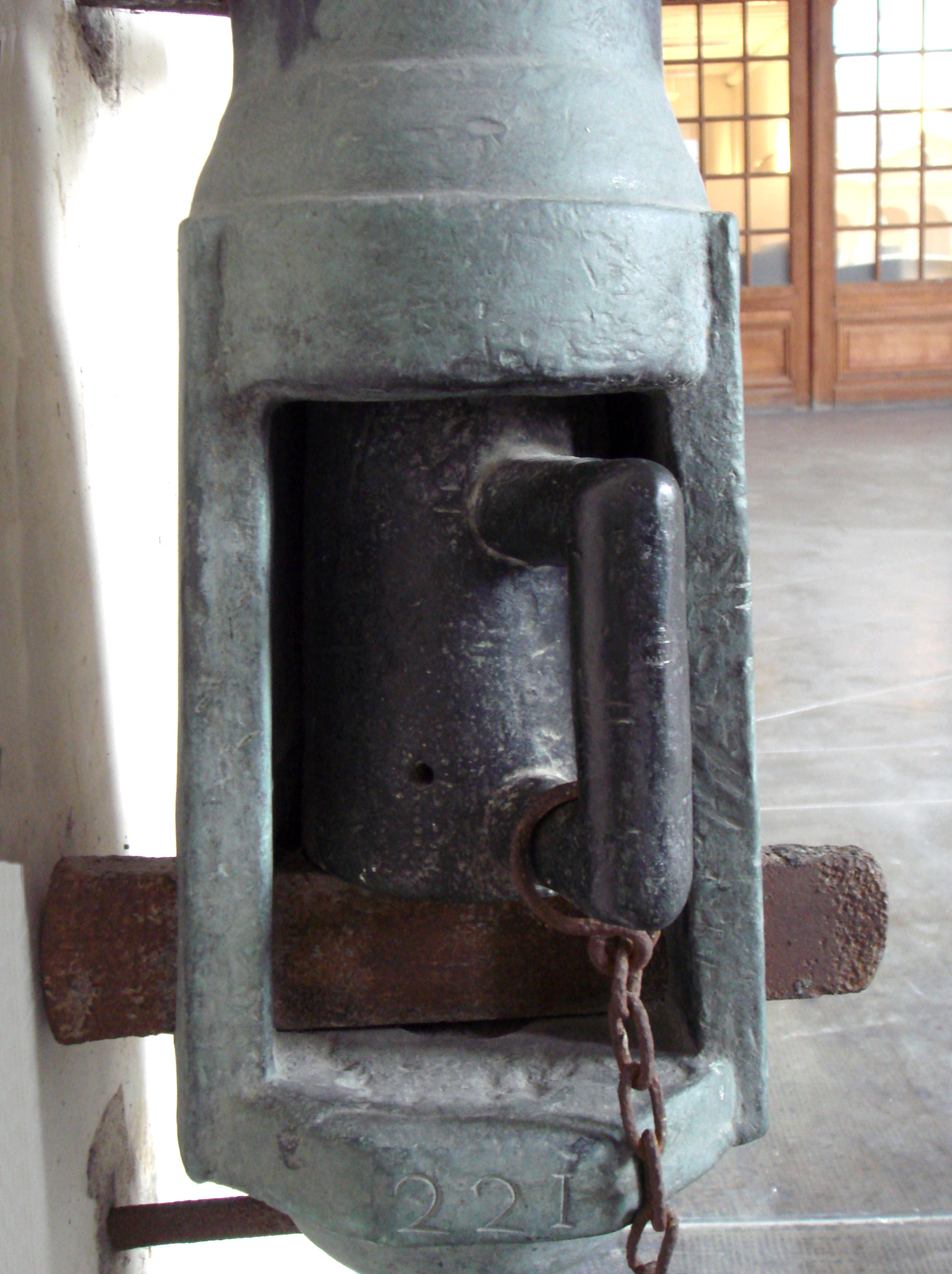
Breech-loading swivel gun with mug-shaped chamber and wedge to hold it in place

Although breech-loading is often considered a modern innovation which facilitated the loading of cannons, breech-loading swivel guns were invented in the 14th century, and used worldwide from the 16th century onward by numerous countries, many of them non-European. They have been called by many names, sometimes "Murderer", "Base", "Sling", "Port-Piece", "Serpentine", "Culverin", "Pierrier", "Stock Fowler", and "Patterero" in English; "Pierrier à boîte" in French; "Berço" in Portuguese; "Verso" in Spanish; "Prangi" in Turkish; "Kammerschlange" (lit. "chamber snake", properly means "breech-loading falconet") in German; "Folangji" (佛郎机, from Turkish "Prangi" or Turkic "Farangi"), "Folangji chong" (佛郎机铳, Prangi or Farangi gun), "Fo-lang-chi p'ao" (佛朗机炮 or 佛朗機砲, Portuguese cannon) in Chinese; "Bulanggi-po" ("불랑기포[佛郞機砲]") in Korean; "Furanki" (仏郎機砲, "Frankish gun") or 子砲 ("Child cannon") in Japanese; and "Bedil" or "bḍil" (ꦧꦣꦶꦭ) in Javanese. Some of them were used until the 20th century.

Breech-loading swivel guns were developed surprisingly early, and were used from 1364 onward. The guns were loaded with mug-shaped chambers, in which gunpowder and projectile had been filled in advance. The chamber was then put in place, blocked with a wedge, and then fired. As the loading was made in advance and separately, breech-loading swivel guns were quick-firing guns for their time. An early description of a breech-loading swivel gun puts the weight of the gun at 118 kilograms (260 lb), equipped with three chambers for rotations, each 18 kilograms (40 lb) in weight, and firing a 280 grams (9.9 oz) lead shot. The guns had a disadvantage: they leaked and lost power around the chambers, but this was compensated by the high rate of fire as multiple chambers could be prepared in advance. Breech-loading swivel gun could fire either cannonballs against obstacles, or grapeshot against troops.

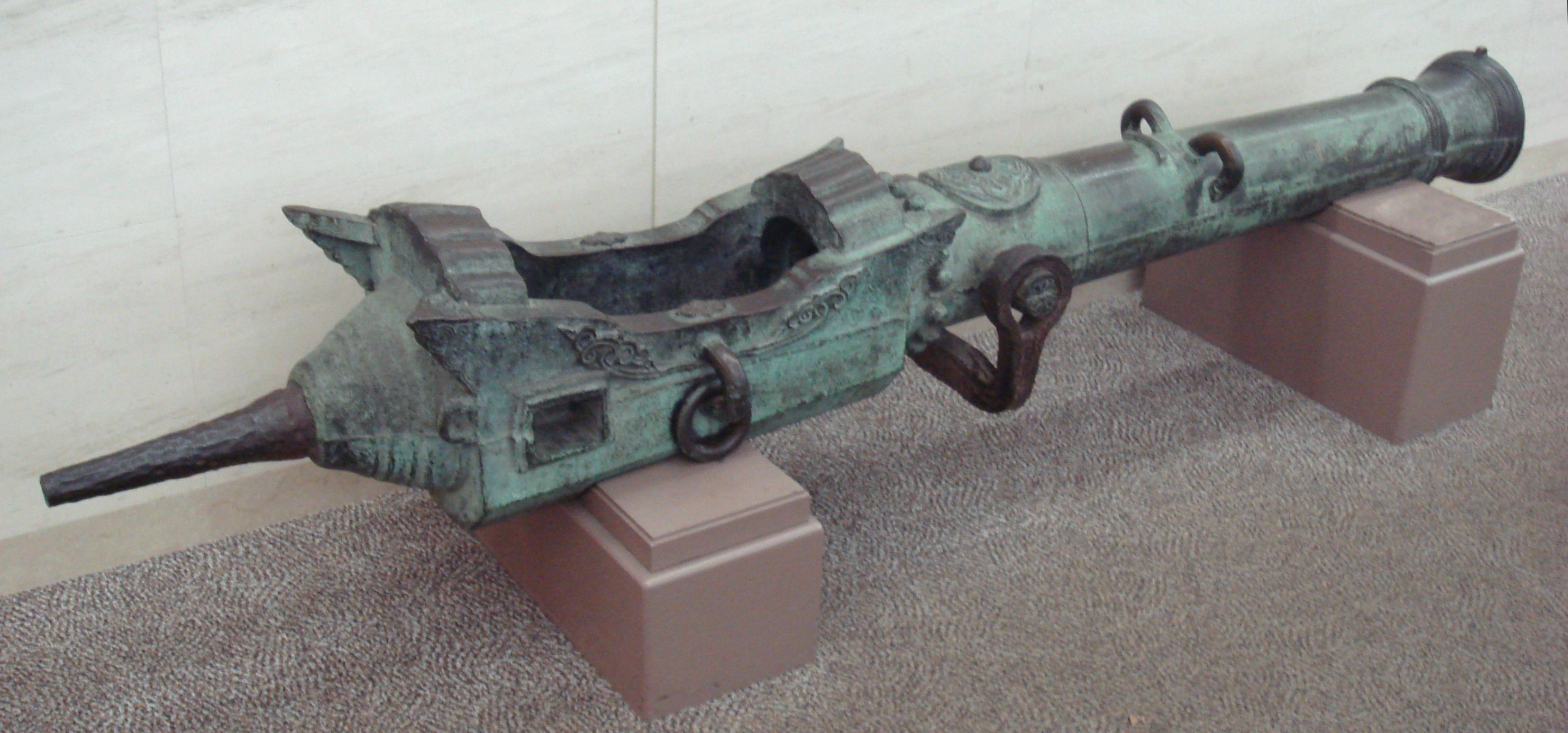
A Japanese breech-loading swivel gun of the time of the 16th century, obtained by Ōtomo Sōrin. This gun is thought to have been cast in Goa, Portuguese India. Caliber: 95 mm (3.7 in), length: 2.88 m (9.4 ft).

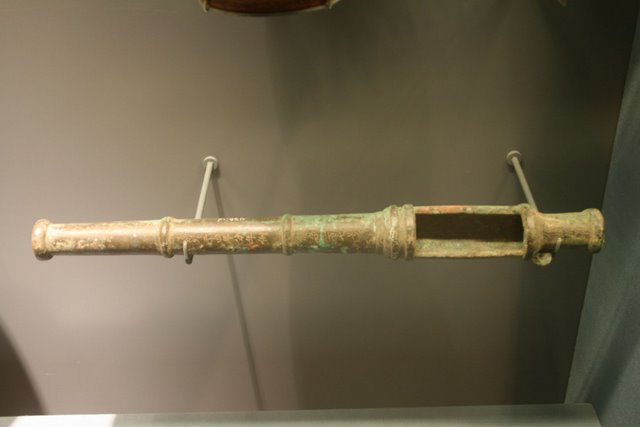
A Ming bronze cannon with open breech

During the Middle-Ages, breech-loading swivel guns were developed by the Europeans also partly as a cheaper alternative to the very expensive bronze cast muzzle-loading cannons, as bronze was many times more expensive than iron. As cast iron was not yet technologically feasible for the Europeans, the only possibility was to use wrought iron bars hammered together and held with hoops like barrels. With this method, a one piece design was very difficult, and a fragmental structure, with separated chamber and barrel was then selected.

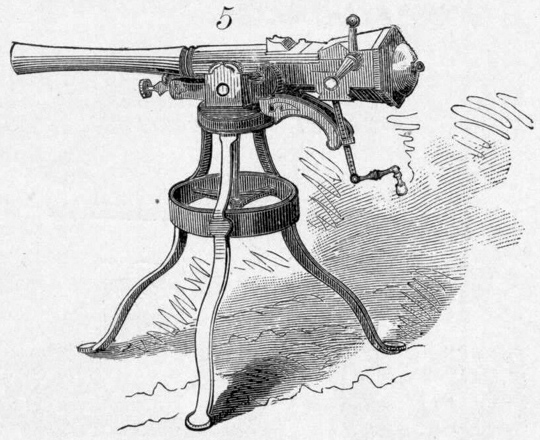
Breech-loading swivel cannon, left by Gustavus Adolphus at Munich, 1632

Around 1500, Europeans learnt how to cast iron, and shifted their cannon productions to one-piece iron muzzle-loaders. China started to adopt European breech-loading swivel guns from 1500 onward, limiting at the same time the production of their own muzzle-loaders, because of the high effectiveness of the breech-loading swivel gun as an anti-personnel gun, which to them was more interesting than the sheer power of a cannonball.

Usage of the breech-loading swivel gun continued in Europe however, with, as early as the 17th century, characteristics very similar to the modern machine-gun or mitrailleuse.

== Use ==
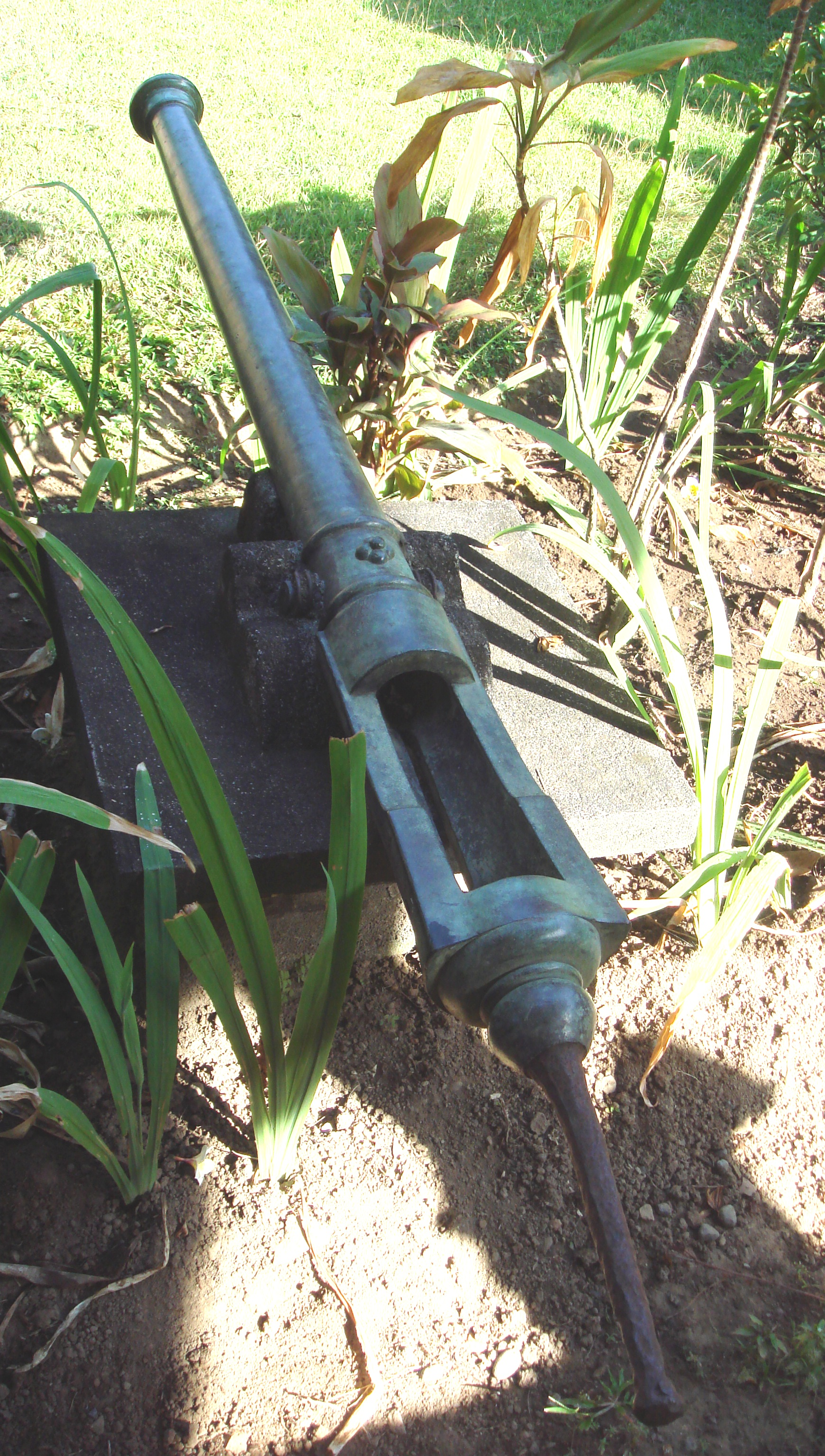
Bali Museum breech-loading swivel gun (Cetbang). Length: 1833 mm. Bore: 43 mm. Length of tiller: 315 mm. Widest part: 190 mm (at the base ring).

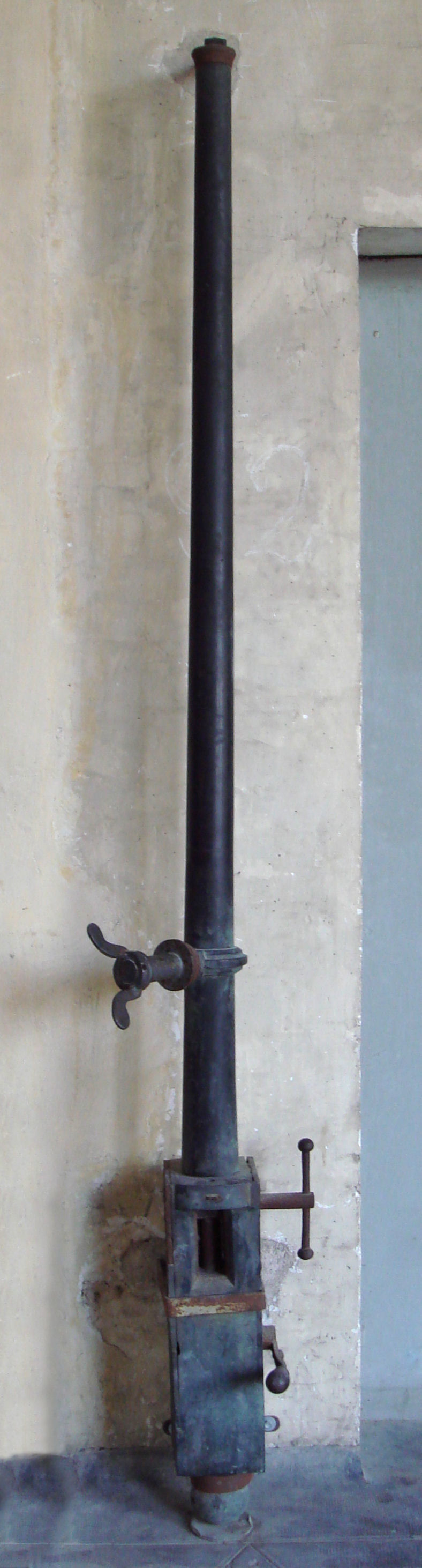
United States 30 mm 1890 steel rifled breech-loading swivel gun, brought from Madagascar to France in 1898. Length 230 cm.

Breech-loading swivel guns were used to advantage at the bow and stern on warships, but were also used in fortifications.

Breech loading guns were used by Burgundians as early as 1364. The Portuguese had versos (Berços) in c. 1410, while England has a picture of port-pieces of 1417, although the picture itself was made c. 1485. The Ottomans used the prangi from the mid-15th century onwards in field battles, aboard their ships, and in their forts, where prangis often comprised the majority of the ordnance. These weapons would spread eastward to Indian ocean, eventually reaching Southeast Asia in c. 1460 AD.

In China and Japan, breech-loading swivel guns were brought after China defeated the Portuguese in the 16th century. At the Battle of Xicaowan in 1522, after defeating the Portuguese in battle, the Chinese captured Portuguese breech-loading swivel guns and then reverse engineered them, calling them "Folangji" or "Fo-lang-chi" (佛郎機 – Frankish) guns, since the Portuguese were called "Folangji" by the Chinese. A shipwreck in 1523 apparently brought the gun to China, but the transmission may have occurred earlier. Views diverge on whether the origin of the cannon is Portuguese or Turkish. There was a confusion whether folangji was supposed to be the name of a people (the Portuguese) or name of a weapon. In fact the word folangji represent 2 different words with different etymology. The term folangji as a weapon is related to the prangi carried in Ottoman galleys and farangi used by Babur. The word folangji as an ethnonym (Frankish or Portuguese) is unrelated. The Ottoman prangi guns may have reached Indian ocean before either Ottoman or Portuguese ships did. They may also reach China through the Silk Road. In the Unofficial Gleanings of the Wanli Era (萬曆野獲編) by Shen Defu, it is said that "After the reign of Hongzhi (1445–1505), China started having Fu-Lang-Ji cannons, the country of which was called in the old times Sam Fu Qi". In volume 30 about "The Red-Haired Foreigners" he wrote "After the reign of Zhengtong (1436–1449) China got hold of Fu-Lang-Ji cannons, the most important magic instrument of foreign people". He mentioned the cannons some 60 or 70 years prior to the first reference about Portuguese. It was impossible for the Chinese to get hold of the Portuguese cannons prior to their arrival. Pelliot viewed that the folangji gun reached China before Portuguese did, possibly by anonymous carriers from Malaya. Needham noted that breech-loading guns were already familiar in Southern China in 1510, as a rebellion in Huang Kuan was destroyed by more than 100 folangji. It may even be earlier, brought to Fujian by a man named Wei Sheng and used in quelling a pirate incident in 1507.

In Japan, Ōtomo Sōrin seems to have been the first recipient of the guns, possibly as early as 1551. In 1561 the Portuguese, allied with Otomo in the Siege of Moji, bombarded rival Japanese position, possibly with swivel guns. In the Battle of Takajō in 1587, Ōtomo Sōrin used two swivel guns obtained from the Portuguese. The guns were nicknamed Kunikuzushi (国崩し, "Destroyer of Provinces").

In the later portions of the Ming dynasty (mid 16th century onward) it appears that these types of guns were the most common and numerous type of artillery used by the Ming forces. a great deal of variation of such cannons were produced, and it appeared in pretty much all of the conflicts of this time, including the Imjin War. Until the introduction of heavy Dutch cannons in the early 17th century, there were even attempts by the Ming to make large heavy versions of such guns.

Other countries also used swivel guns. In Bali, such a gun was found in the possession of the Raja of Badung, and is now located in the Bali Museum. Numerous such guns were also used in Northern Africa by Algerian rebels in their resistance to French forces.

Breech-loading swivel guns were also used extensively in Southeast Asia as early as the 16th century, apparently even before the arrival of the Portuguese and Spanish there, and continued to be in use as a preferred anti-personnel weapon as late as the 20th century. The Americans fought Moros equipped with breech-loading swivel guns in the Philippines in 1904. In early 20th century, Chinese junks were armed with old-fashioned swivel guns, both muzzle-loader and breech-loader. The breech-loading guns were called "breech loading culverin" by Cardwell, they were 8 feet (2.4 m) long with 1–2 inches (2.54–5.08 cm) bore. These guns were fired using percussion cap mechanism. Dyer c. 1930 noted the use of cannon by Makassan trepanger in Northern Australia, in particular the bronze breechloader with 2 inches (5.08 cm) bore.

Steel rifled breech-loading swivel guns are known which were manufactured by the United States towards the end of the 19th century, and used in colonial theaters such as in Madagascar.

== Gallery ==
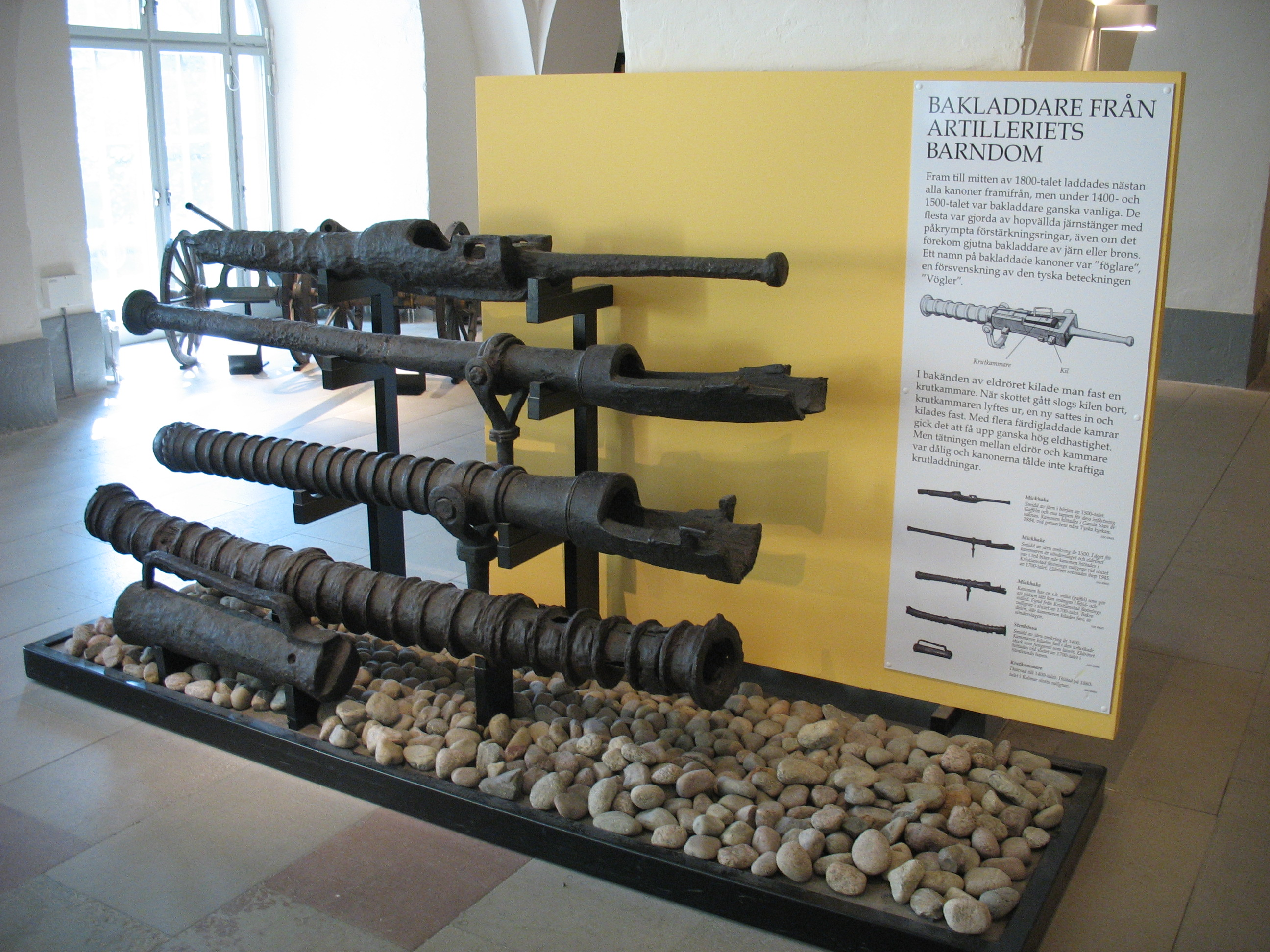
Breech-loading swivel guns from the 15–16th century at the Swedish Army Museum

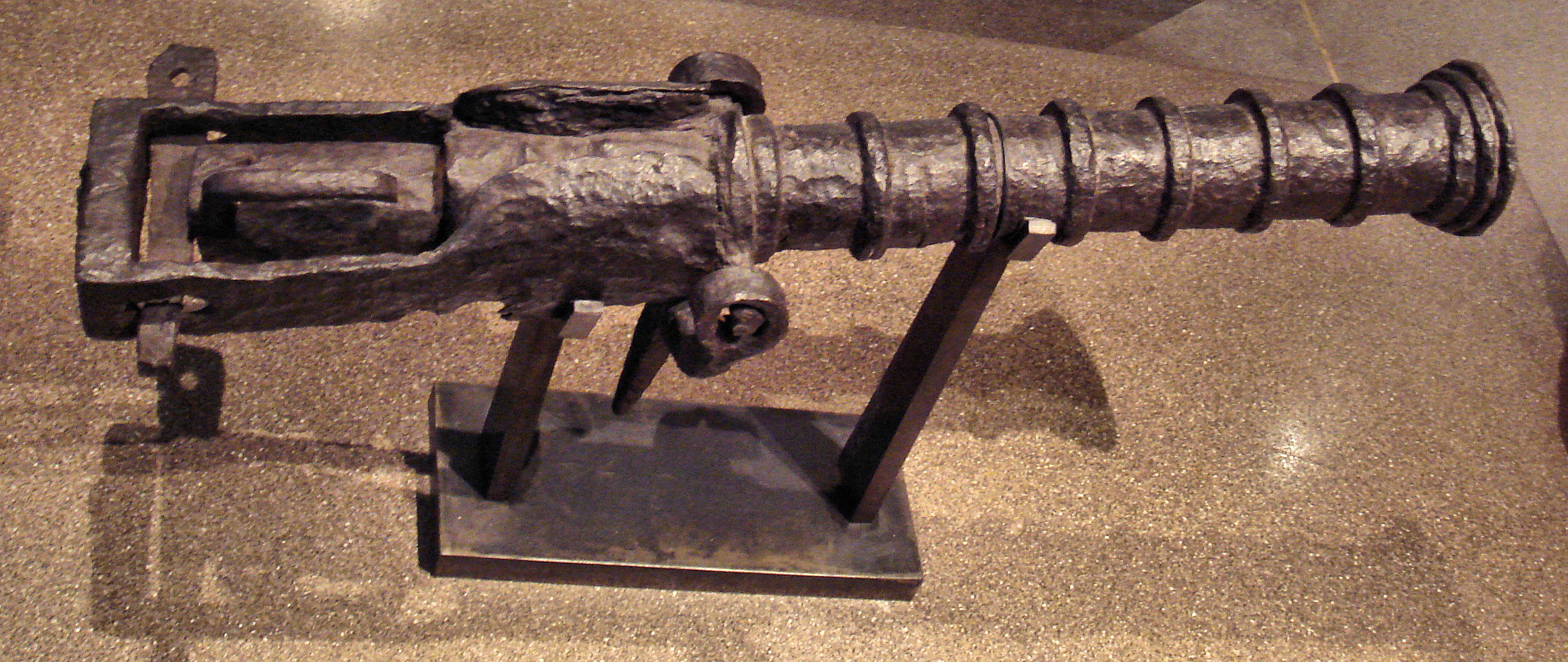
French breech-loading gun from 1410

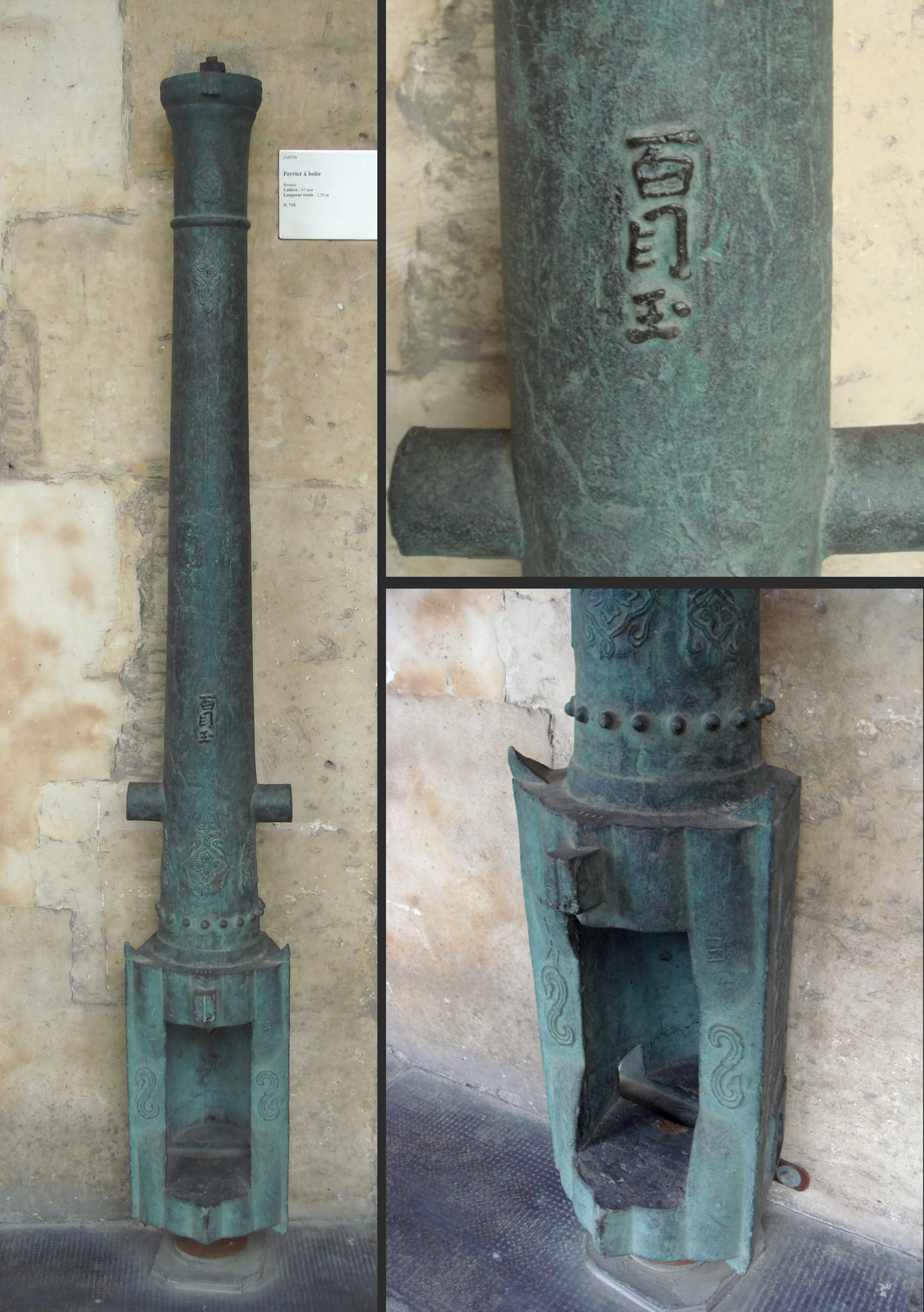
Japanese breech-loading swivel gun. Caliber: 47 mm, length: 159 cm.

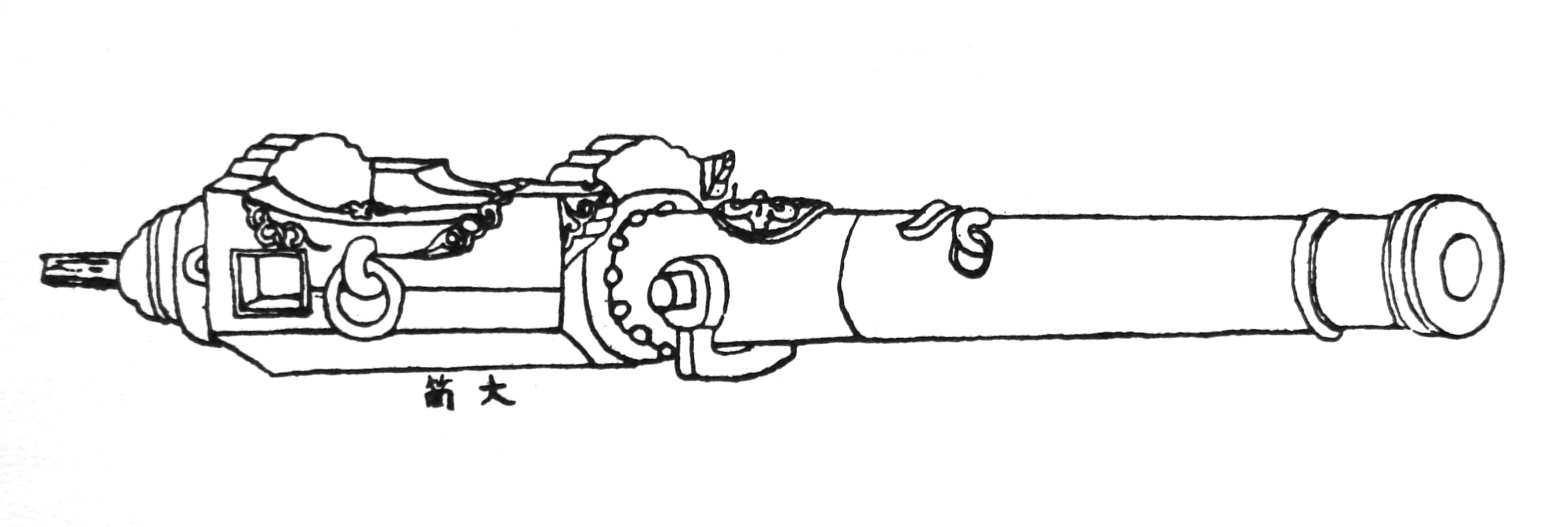
A 16th-century swivel breech-loading Japanese cannon, called an Ōzutsu (大筒, "Big tube")

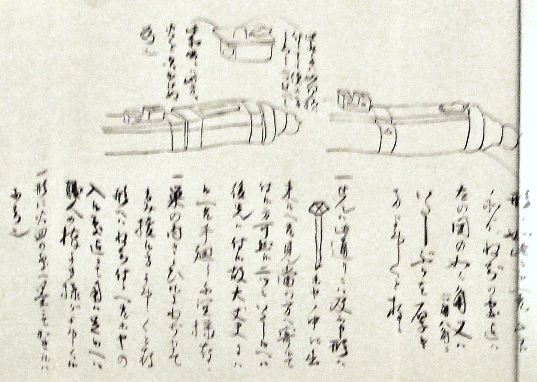
Description of the mechanism of a breech-loading swivel gun in Japanese. 16th century.

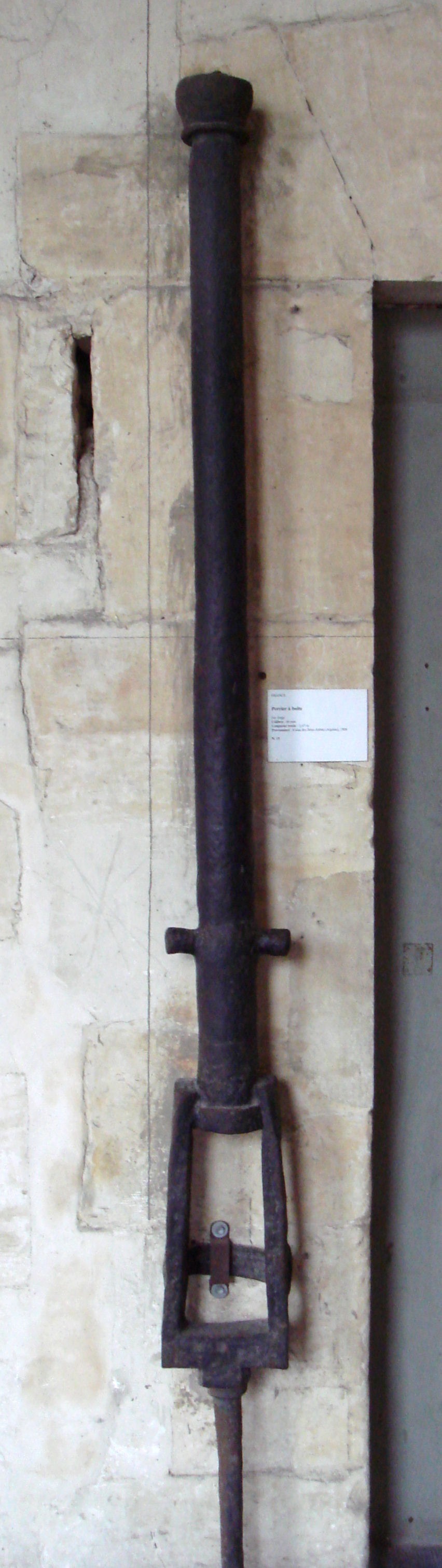
Breech-loading swivel gun, Algeria, 1906. Caliber: 60 mm, length: 247 cm.

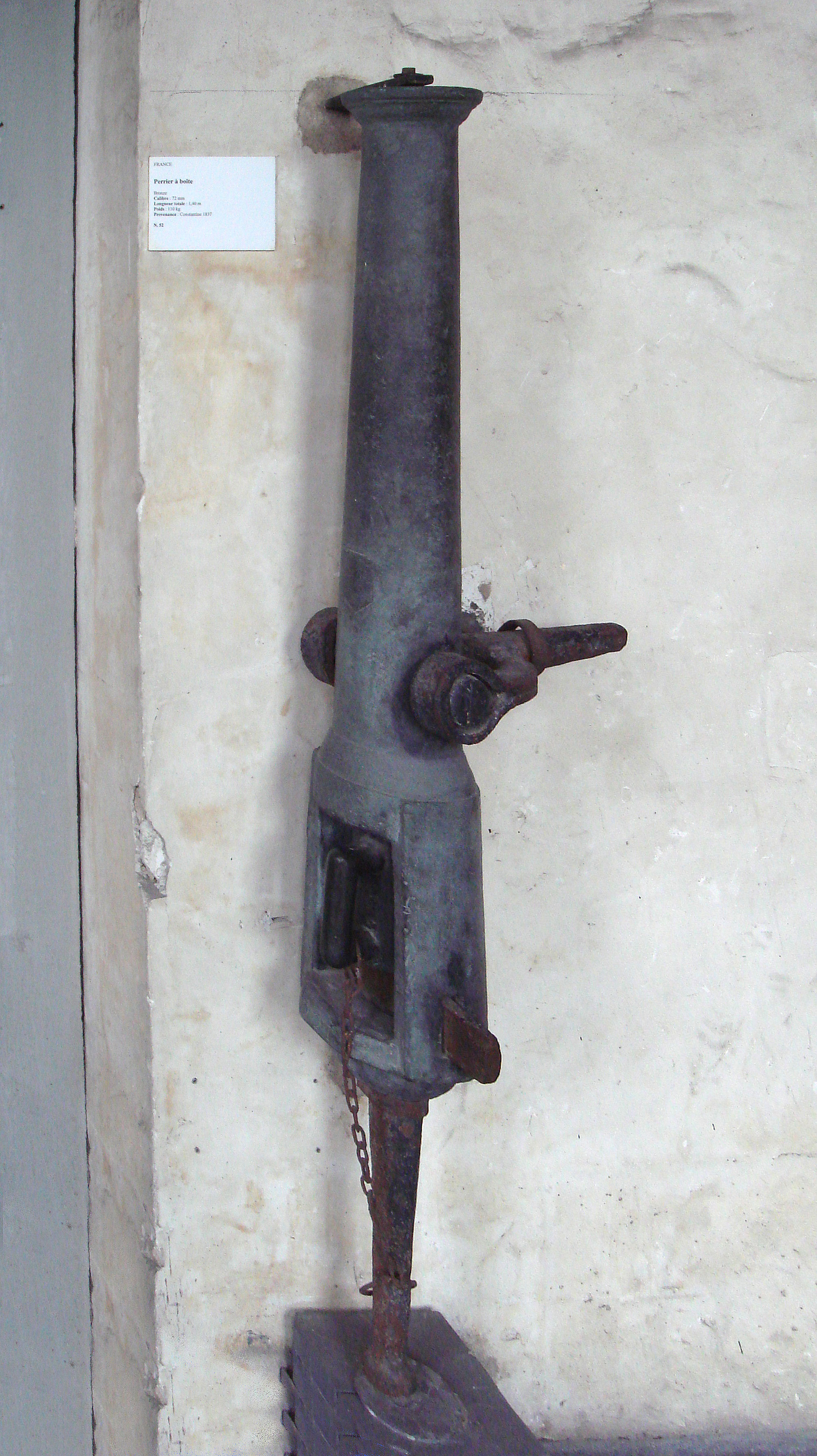
Breech-loading swivel gun, caliber: 72 mm, length: 140 cm, weight: 110 kg, seized by France in Constantine in 1837.

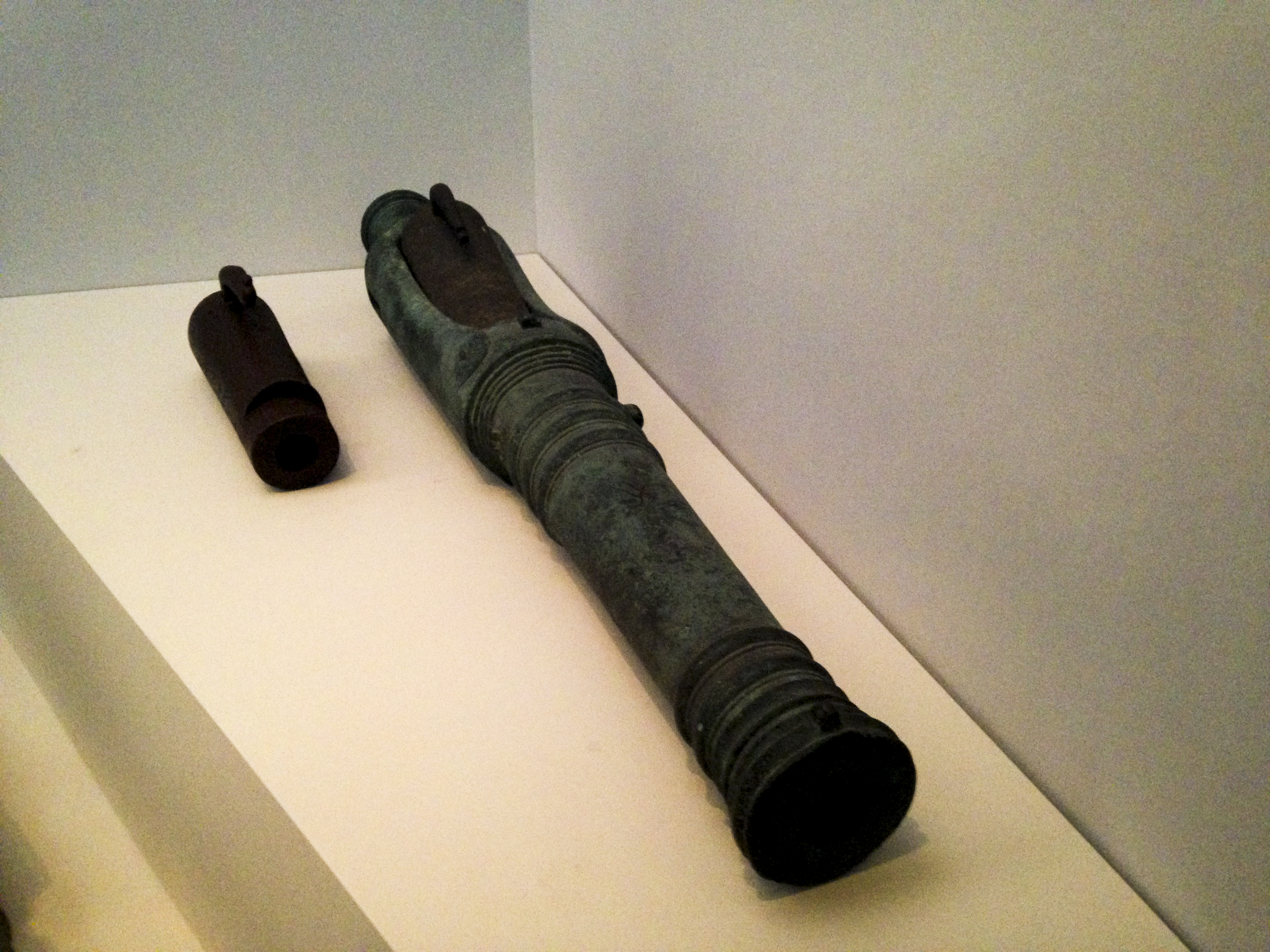
Korean breech-loading swivel gun with mug-shaped chamber

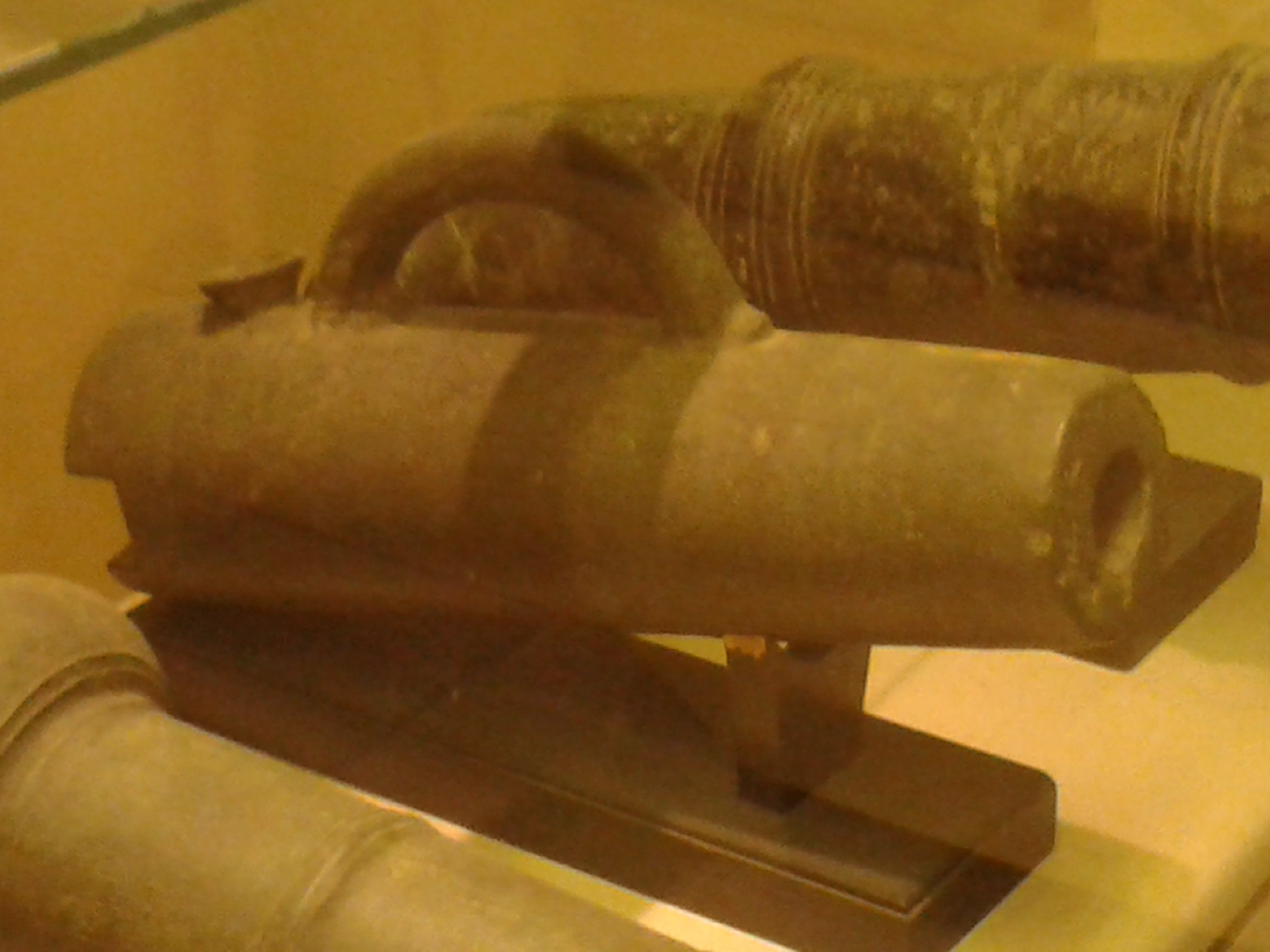
17th century Vietnamese breech block

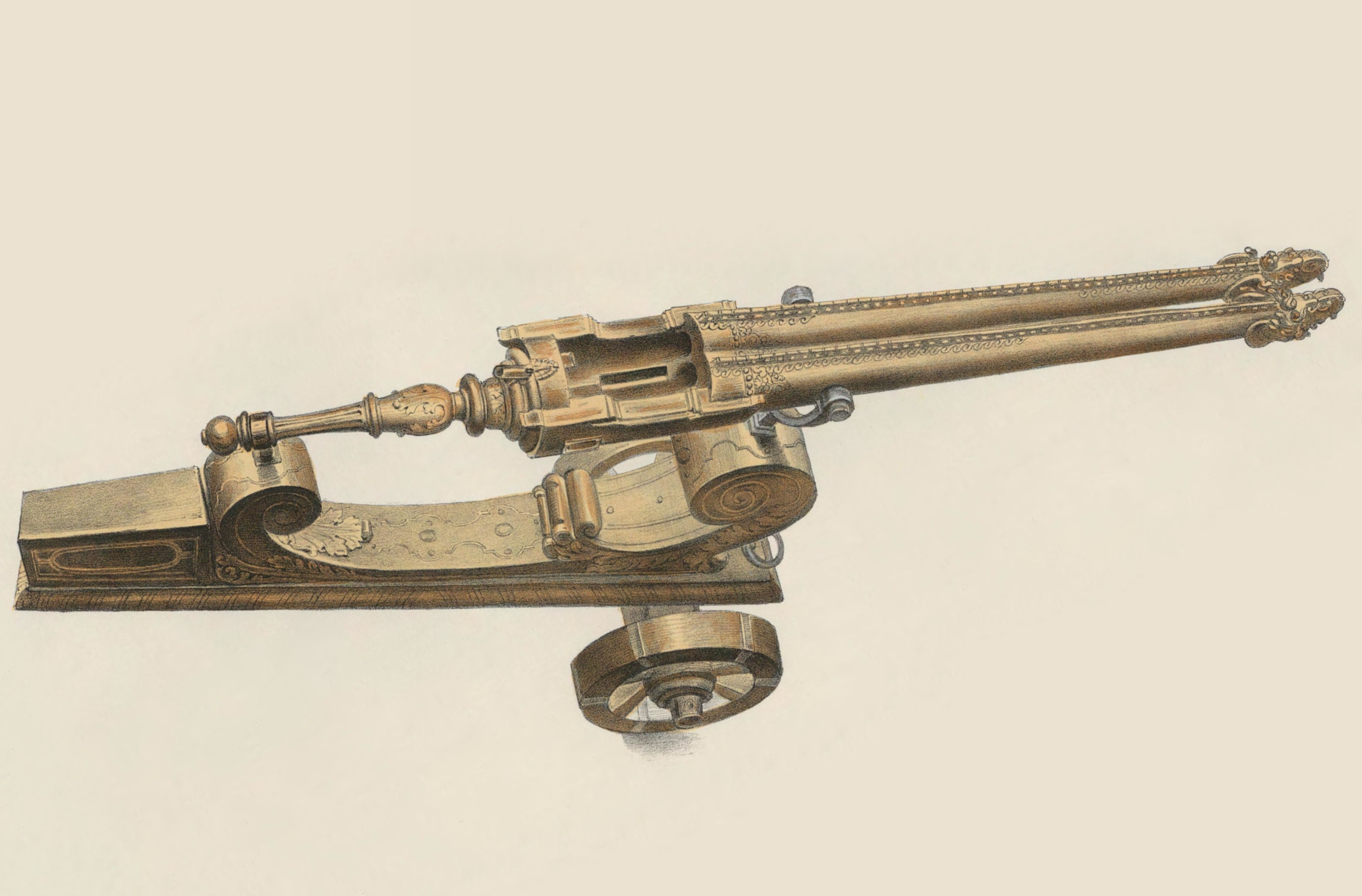
A double barrelled cetbang on a carriage, with swivel yoke, c. 1522. The mouth of the cannon is in the shape of Javanese Nāga.

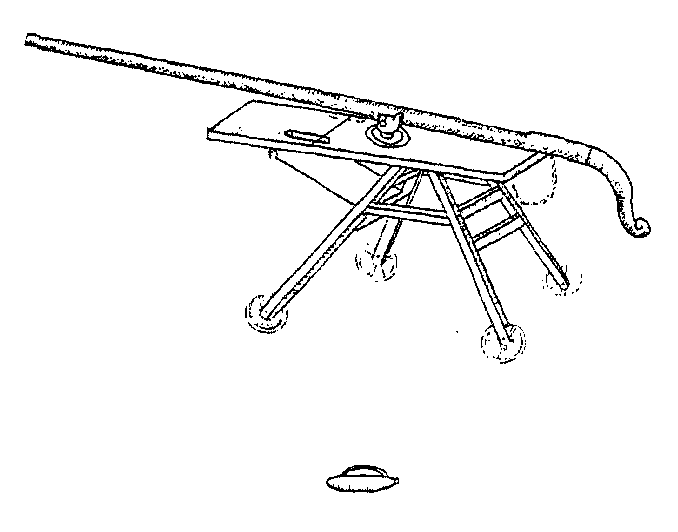
Mother and child gun of Qing dynasty (1759). It weighs 85 catties (42.5 kg) and has a total length of 203 cm

== See also ==
- Culverin, also refers to breech-loading swivel gun
- Artillery of Japan
- Gunpowder weapons in the Ming dynasty
- History of Bali
- Gunpowder weapons of Nusantara
