= Culverin =

Early gun; small arm and then a cannon

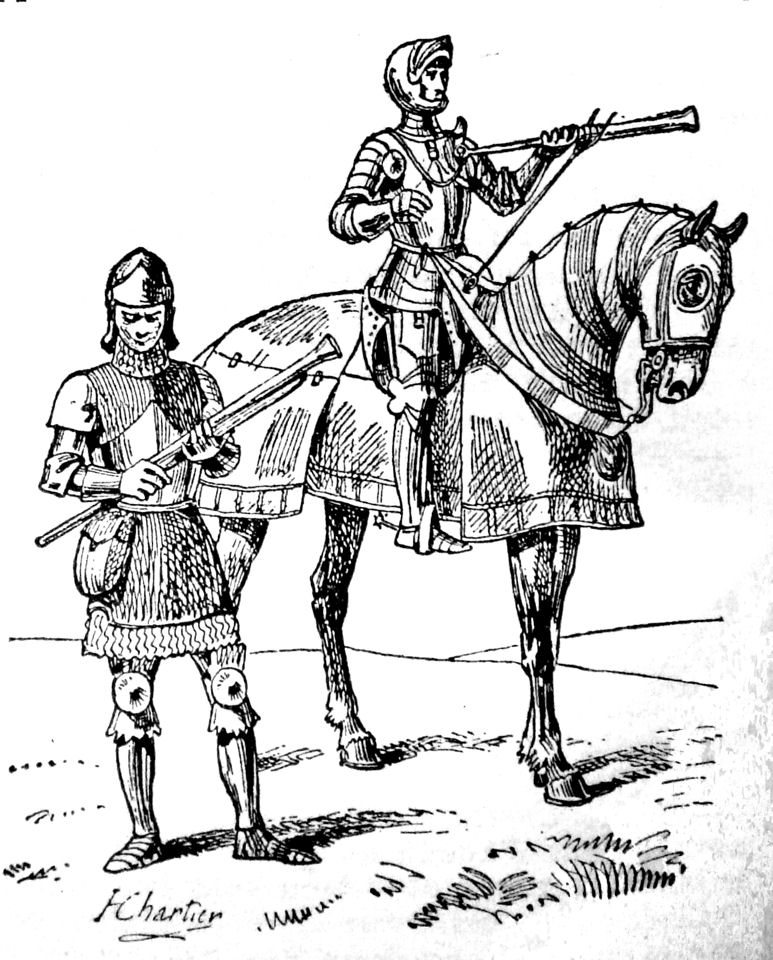
15th century culveriners

A culverin was initially an ancestor of the hand-held arquebus, but the term was later used to describe a type of medieval and Renaissance cannon. The word is derived from the antiquated "culuering" and the French couleuvrine (from couleuvre "grass snake", following Latin: colubrinus, lit. 'of the nature of a snake'). From its origin as a hand-held weapon it was adapted for use as artillery by the French in the 15th century and for naval use by the English in the 16th century. The culverin as an artillery piece had a long smoothbore gun barrel with a relatively long range and flat trajectory, using solid round shot projectiles with high muzzle velocity.

== Hand culverins ==
The hand culverin consisted of a simple smoothbore metal tube, closed at one end except for a small touch hole designed to allow ignition of the gunpowder. The tube was attached to a wood or metal extension which could be held under the arm. It was loaded with gunpowder and lead bullets and fired by inserting a burning slow match into the touch hole.

James IV of Scotland was an enthusiastic user of hand culverins in 1508. He held shooting matches in the great halls of Holyrood Palace and Stirling Castle, took a culverin to stalk deer in the park of Falkland Palace, and shot at sea birds from a row boat off the Isle of May with his culverin.

In addition to the arquebus, the culverin also evolved into the heavier breech-loading swivel gun weighing around 40 kg (88 lb), which required a swivel for support and aiming. This weapon was designed to use removable mug-shaped chambers which were prefilled with gunpowder and projectiles to speed up reloading. Breech-loading swivel guns were often used on ships against enemy crew or boarders.

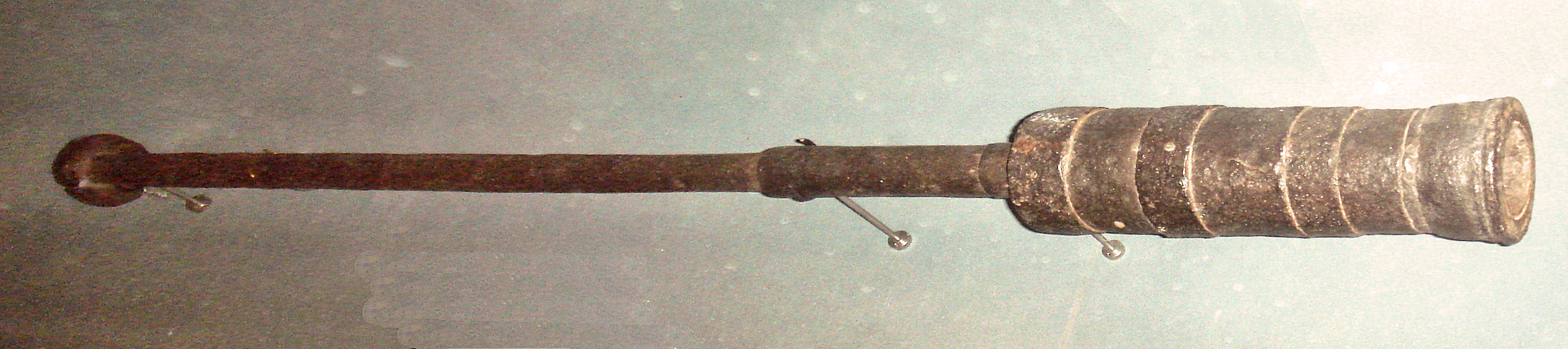
"Hand bombard", or early culverin, 1390–1400

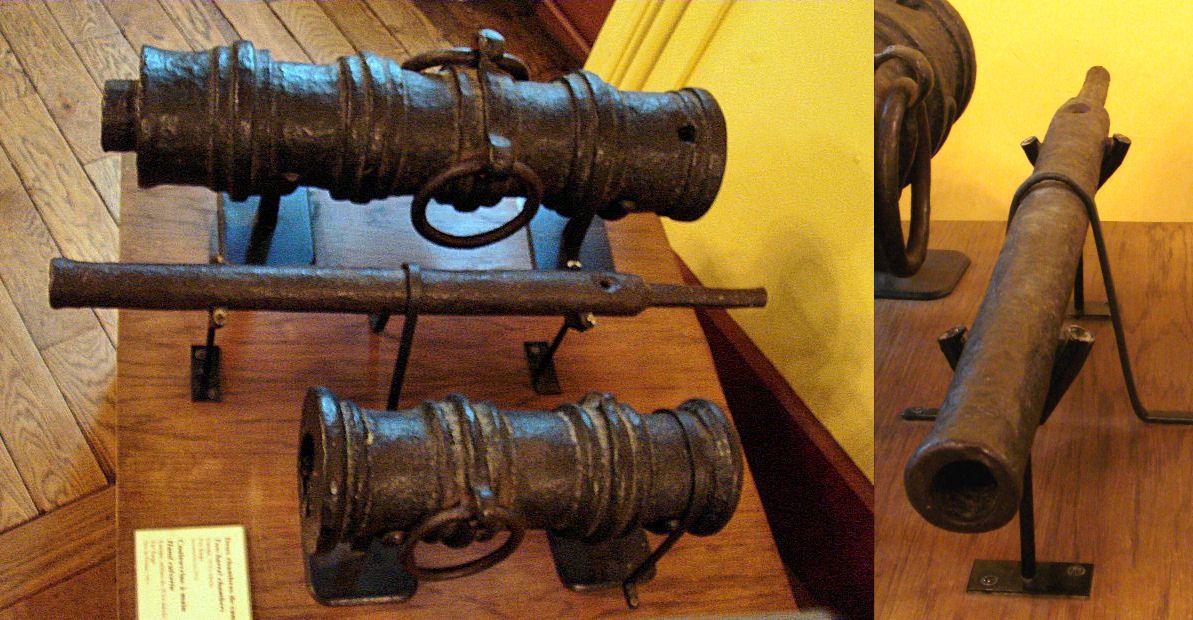
Hand culverin (middle) with two small cannons, Europe, 15th century

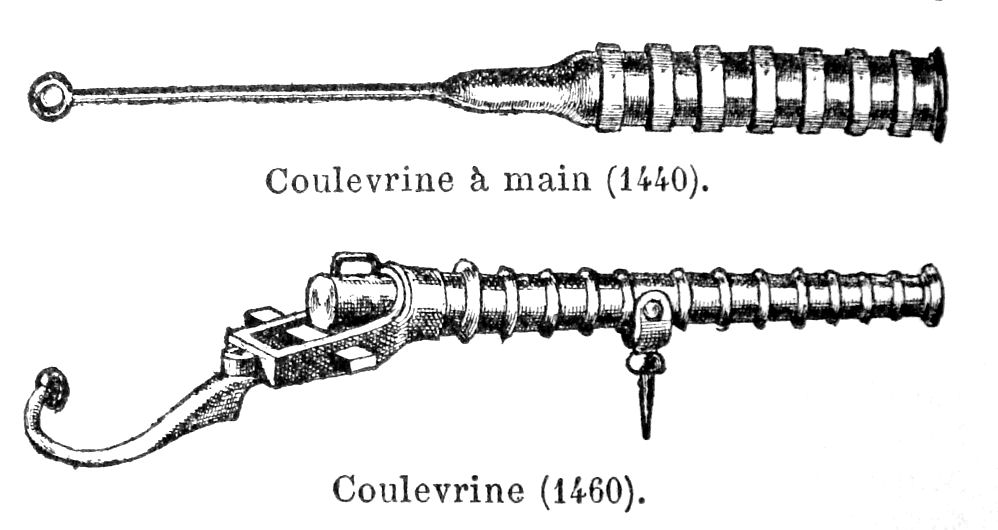
Early culverins (15th century): a hand culverin (top), and a culverin with removable chamber (bottom)

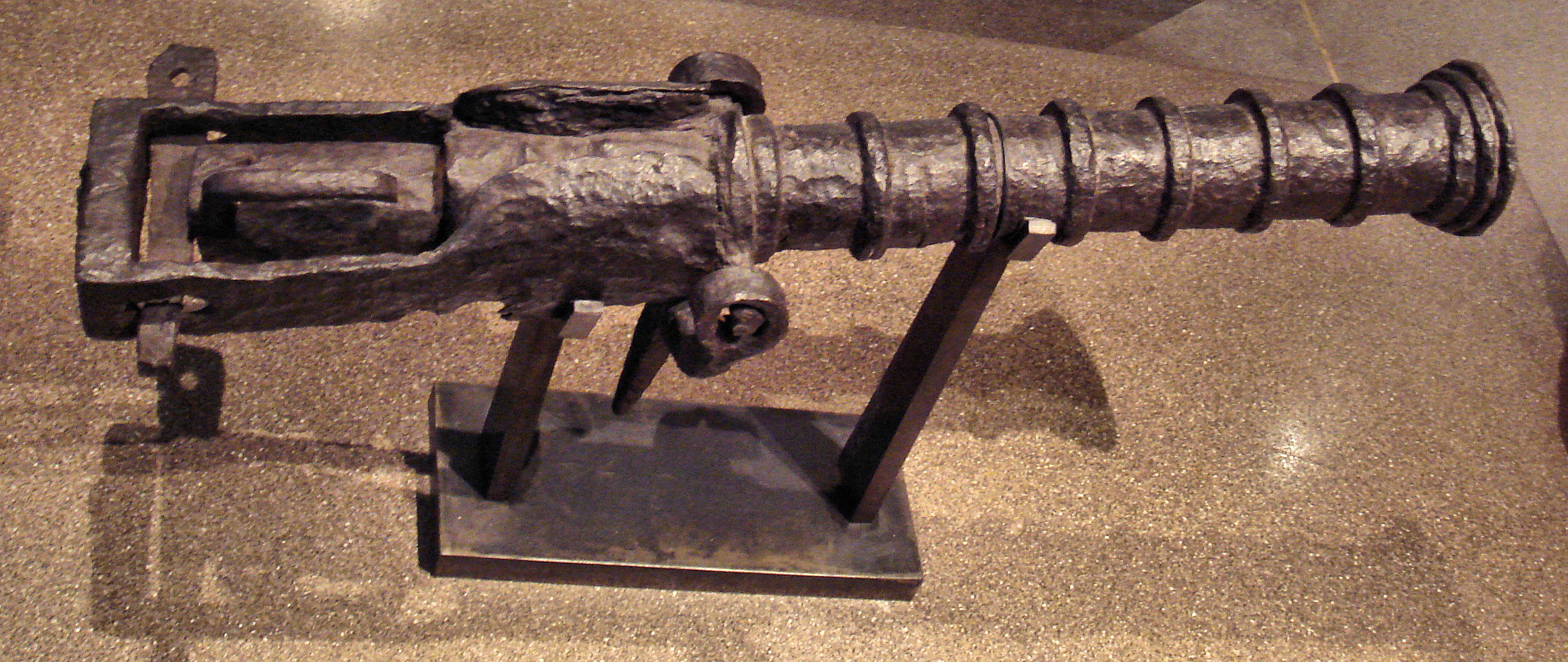
"Murderer", France, 1410

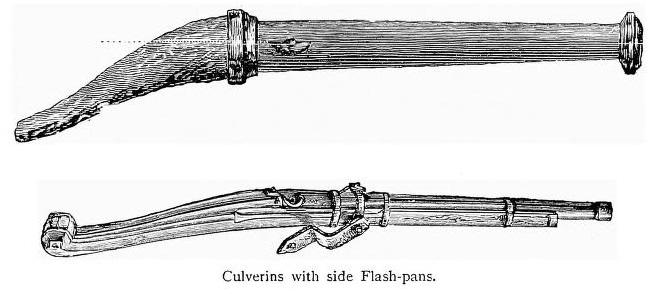
Culverin with side flash-pans

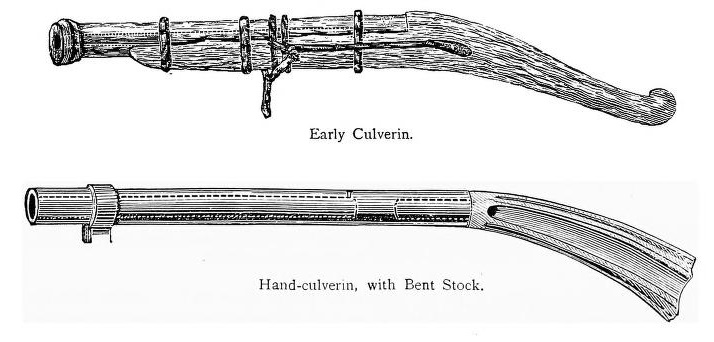
Above: Early culverin, below: Hand culverin with bent stock

== Field culverins ==
Three types of culverin artillery pieces were used, distinguished by their size: the "culverin extraordinary", the "ordinary", and the "least-sized".

Name	Bore diameter	Length	Weight	Shot diameter	Shot weight
Culverin extraordinary	5 1/2 in (140 mm)	32 calibers (14 ft 8 in; 4.47 m)	4,800 lb (2,200 kg)	5 1/4 in (130 mm)	20 lb (9.1 kg)
Ordinary culverin.	5 1/2 in (140 mm)	25 calibers (12 ft; 3.7 m)	4,500 lb (2,000 kg)	5 in (130 mm)	17 lb 5 oz (7.9 kg)
Culverin of the least size	5 in (130 mm)	29 calibers (12 ft; 3.7 m)	4,000 lb (1,800 kg)	3 3/4 in (95 mm)	14 lb 9 oz (6.6 kg)

There were also smaller versions, including the "bastard culverin" (4 inches; 100 mm), 7-pound (3.2 kg) shot and the "demi-culverin" or "culverin-moyen" (4 1/2 inches; 110 mm), 10-pound (4.5 kg) shot.

Overall, the culverin was a significant advance over earlier cannons. Since it fired iron round shot instead of stone projectiles and had a longer barrel to enable the gunpowder to fully burn and impart more force to the projectile, the culverin could fire the denser projectile to a relatively greater range and with a flatter trajectory. A replica culverin extraordinary has achieved a muzzle velocity of 408 m/s (1,340 ft/s), and a range over 450 m (1,480 ft) using only minimal elevation. This velocity and mass imply that the cannonball had a kinetic energy of roughly 600 kilojoules (440,000 ft⋅lbf) when leaving the muzzle.

In Britain, Brigadier General Michael Richards was appointed Master-General of the Ordnance in 1714 and he commissioned a Danish expert, Albert Borgard, to design a new artillery system. Borgard did away with the traditional nomenclature of culverins, sakers and minions, and devised a new system based on the weight of shot that each gun used, from 4 to 64 pounds. Although Borgard's gun designs were quickly superseded, the practice of naming ordnance by weight of shot persisted in Britain into the 20th century.

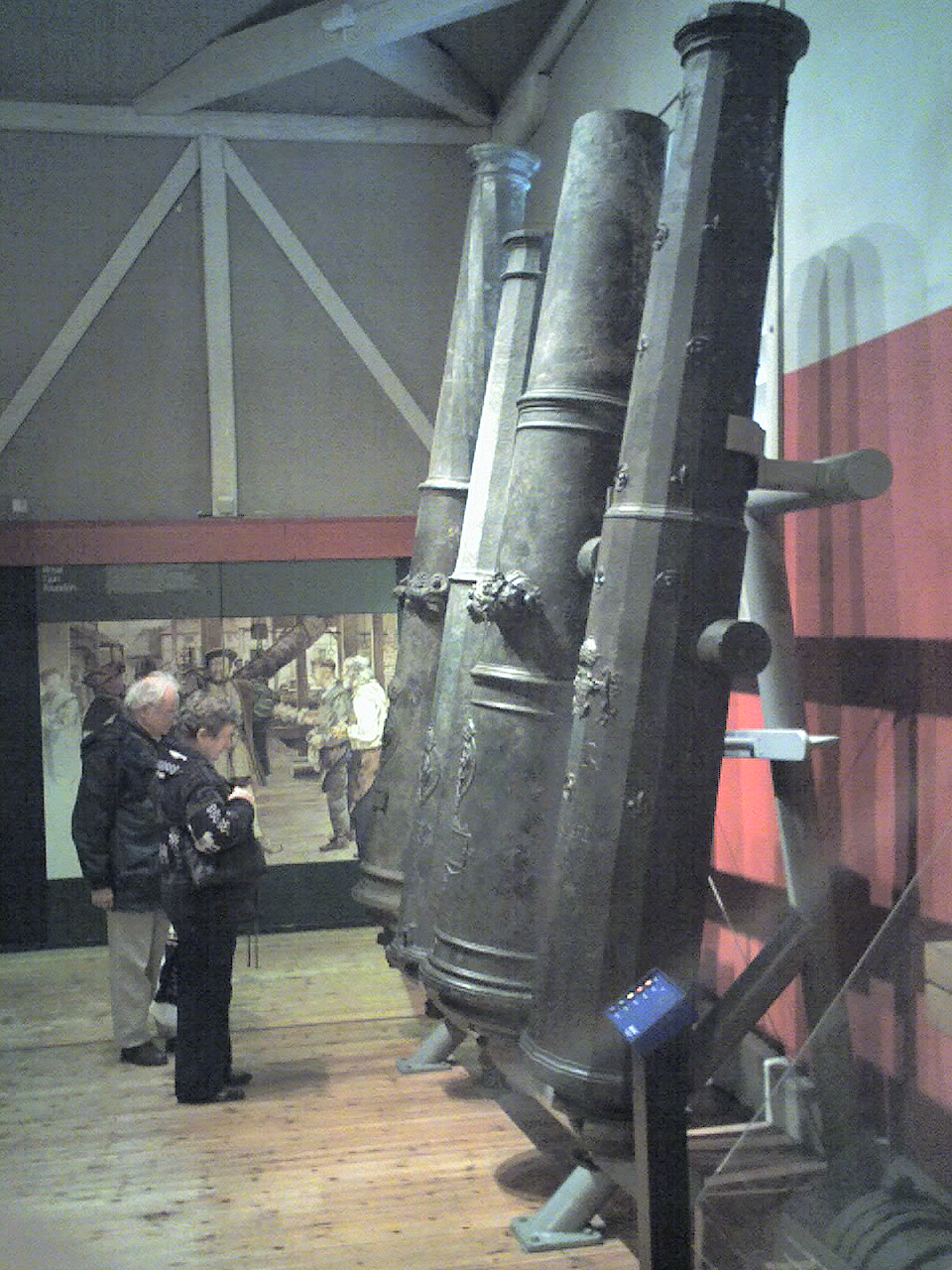
Bronze culverins and demi-cannon, on display at the Mary Rose Museum, Portsmouth

Pounder culverin with the muzzle cut 16th century - Museo Storico Navale.

== See also ==
- Arquebus
- Demi-culverin
- Doglock
- Flintlock
- Hand cannon
- Matchlock
- Miquelet lock
- Musket
- Pistol
- Snaphance
- Snaplock
- Wheellock
