= 2019 in archaeology =

This page lists major events of 2019 in archaeology.

== Excavations ==
- April 4–9 - "The Old Brig" wreck, probably a cutter, of around 1720 at Seasalter on the Kent coast of England.
- June - Major components of a Fairey Barracuda torpedo bomber from 1943 are recovered from The Solent.
- Thorough archaeological survey of the wreck of tugboat Robert C. Pringle (1903) in Lake Michigan.
- Viking hall at Skaill, Westness on Rousay in Orkney.
- Boar's Head Theatre in the east end of London.

== Finds ==
- January
  - A site corresponding to that of the Red Lion theatre of 1567 in the east end of London is located.
  - The Chew Valley Hoard of 2,528 silver coins from around the time of the Norman conquest of England (including some mules) is found in Somerset by metal detectorists Lisa Grace and Adam Staples.
  - 3 – A temple built between 1000 and 1260 CE and dedicated to Xipe Totec (Flayed Lord) is discovered in Ndachjian-Tehuacan, Puebla.
  - 24 – A collection of 20 tombs is discovered in Kom Al-Khelgan in the Nile Delta, dating back to the Middle Kingdom and the beginning of the New Kingdom, from about 1640 to 1540 B.C.
  - 25 – Discovery of the coffin of Captain Matthew Flinders (d. 1814) in London excavations in advance of High Speed 2 is announced.
  - 26 – A collection of nine tombs is discovered in Qubbet el-Hawa near Aswan, dating back to the Old Kingdom.
  - 31 – Discovery of evidence of Iron Age beer making from c. 400 B.C. in Cambridgeshire, England is announced.
- February
  - A "two gamboling goats" plaque is discovered at Arslantepe, the capital of the Neo-Hittite kingdom of Melid.
  - 2 – A collection of fifty mummies is discovered in Tuna el-Gebel in Minya Governorate, dating back to the Ptolemaic Kingdom.
  - 4 – Four hundred ancient stone monuments are found near Tifariti in Western Sahara, dating back to over 10,000 years ago to 3,000 years ago.
  - 7 – Roman lead coffins are discovered in Surrey, decorated with scallop shells which might refer to fertility and rebirth in the Romano-Celtic culture.
  - 13 – An ancient shipyard is found at the Tel Abu Saifi archaeological site in the northern Sinai Peninsula, which might have been the Roman fortress of Silla.
  - 27 – A criosphinx and other unfinished sculptures are discovered at the Gebel el-Silsila, dating back to the reign of Amenhotep III.
- March
  - 10 – An ancient city, probably one of the three ancient capitals of the Qin dynasty (Chinese: 废丘), is found accidentally by workers who are building the Xi'an Metro.
  - 25 – A number of Aztec sacrifices including a richly adorned jaguar dressed as a warrior at the Templo Mayor are discovered in Mexico City, which may lead to Moctezuma II's tomb.
  - 26
    - Ancient inscriptions are found on carved rocks, stelai and ostraka at the Amethyst mining site of Wadi el-Hudi, dating back to the Middle Kingdom.
    - A port used to transport stones from their quarries to the pyramid sites is located near Gebel el-Silsila on the east bank of the Nile, dating back to the Eighteenth Dynasty.
  - 28 – Discovery of remains of a B-24 bomber that crashed into the sea near Bermuda in 1945 is announced.
  - 30 – A 14-year-old boy in Glasgow, Scotland, discovers long-lost medieval stone carvings in a cemetery.
- April
  - 1 – French archaeologists in Iraqi Kurdistan discover the remains of a lost city at Kunara, near the Zagros Mountains.
  - 3 – Announcements of discoveries of:
    - Bones at Hirado, Nagasaki in Japan believed to belong to William Adams (died 1620).
    - The wreck of a ship of about 1540 in the Dutch North Sea loaded with copper plates with marks of the Fugger family, found by chance in a salvage operation.
  - 5 – A tomb is discovered at Al-Dayabat archaeological site in Sohag Governorate, dating back to the Ptolemaic era.
  - 10 – A new species of hominin, Homo luzonensis, is announced as being found in Callao Cave, Luzon, Philippines. At 67,000 years old, these are the oldest hominin remains found in the archipelago.
  - 13 – A 4,000-year-old tomb of an influential person named 'Khuwy' is found in Saqqara, dating back to the Fifth Dynasty of Egypt.
  - Eastbourne wreck site discovered off the south coast of England, identified in 2023 as Dutch warship Klein Hollandia (sank 1672).
- May
  - 4 – Discovery of the tomb of two officials near the Giza pyramid complex, dating back to the Fifth Dynasty of Egypt, is announced.
  - 14 – An ancient desert fortress is found at Tell El-Kadwa, Sinai Peninsula, dating back to the reign of Psamtik I.
  - 18 – Discovery of a coin of the short-lived Roman usurper Laelianus in Cambridgeshire, England is announced.
  - 21 – A 150-foot-long (46 m) by 50-foot-wide (15 m) Roman building is uncovered at Abbey Farm in Faversham, England.
  - 22
    - The Alabama Historical Commission announces that the wreck of the slave ship Clotilda (scuttled 1860) was found in the Mobile River a year ago.
    - A 17th century fort is discovered in Stornoway in the Western Isles of Scotland.
  - 24
    - Identification of a 2,300-year-old bark shield dating back to the Iron Age, found in 2015 at the Everards Meadows site south of Leicester in England, is announced.
    - A marching camp used by the Roman legions, dating back to the first century during the reign of governor Agricola, is found in Ayrshire.
- June
  - American submarine USS Grayback (SS-208) (sunk 1944) is located by a private research group, Lost 52 Project, off the coast of Okinawa (Japan).
  - 8 – A 5,000-year-old underground city is discovered in Çalış, Avanos, Nevşehir Province, Cappadocia.
  - 13 – 8,000-year-old carvings by Khoisan people are discovered at the Vredefort impact structure.
  - 15–16 – Remains of the Tranent to Cockenzie Waggonway (1722) are excavated near Cockenzie and Port Seton in Scotland.
  - 22 – A Byzantine baptismal font is discovered in the Church of the Nativity, Bethlehem.
  - 27 – 2,000 year-old mummies are found in Egypt, at Saqqara, in the area near Djoser Pyramid; the burial site dates back approximately to between the 6th century BC and the 1st century AD.
  - 28 – A 3,400-year-old Bronze Age palace is found in Kemune, Iraqi Kurdistan; it dates back to the Mittani Empire.
- July
  - 17 – A 9,000-year-old city is discovered near Motza, west of Jerusalem; it dates back to the Neolithic period.
  - 18
    - A 1,200-year-old mosque is found near Rahat, Negev Desert.
    - The Church of the Apostles, Peter and Andrew, is found in the village of Bethsaida.
  - 23 – The wreck of Russia is discovered in Lake Huron.
  - 26 – A Greek temple and treasure-laden ships are found at the sunken city of Heracleion, Egypt.
  - 31 – Remains of the Graeco-Roman Senate are discovered in Pelusium, Egypt.
  - The wreck of SS Hudson (1887) is discovered in Lake Superior.
- August
  - 20 – A 3,800-year-old mural is uncovered at the Vichama site, Huaura Province, north of Lima, Peru.
  - 28 – The 5,000-year-old Dolmen de Guadalperal is uncovered due to seasonal drought of the Valdecañas reservoir.
- September
  - 5 – The wreck of USS H-1, a World War I submarine, is found south of Baja California.
  - 20 – A 2,200-year-old lion statue is found in Assos, Çanakkale Province, Turkey.
  - 30 – A temple is unearthed in Kom Ishqau, Egypt, dating back to the reign of Ptolemy IV Philopator.
  - A gold half-angel coin from the reign of Richard II of England is found near Buckingham.
- October
  - 7 – A 5,000-year-old Bronze Age Canaanite settlement is discovered at En Esur, Israel.
  - 11 – An ancient "industrial area" is uncovered in Luxor, which highlights the tools and techniques used to produce the royal coffins.
  - 19 – Thirty ancient coffins are found in El-Assasif near Luxor, Egypt, from the earlier Twenty-second Dynasty.
  - 23 – An ancient church with intricate mosaics is found in Beit Shemesh, Israel, built during the reign of Justinian I.
  - 30
    - The discovery during the summer of the wreck of British submarine HMS Urge, sunk in 1942 off Malta, is announced.
    - The discovery of the deepest known wreck, American destroyer USS Johnston, sunk in 1944 in the Battle off Samar, is announced.
  - 31
    - A 25-metre-wide (82 ft) ring cairn, dating back to the Bronze Age, is found near Tidenham, Gloucestershire.
    - An 11,000-year-old ancient temple, dating back to the Neolithic era, is unearthed in Dargeçit, Turkey.
- November
  - 2 – One of Britain's first cities is discovered at Blick Mead on Salisbury Plain, probably occupied by hunter-gatherers, who built Stonehenge, 10,000 years ago.
  - 5 – A Roman-era catacomb is discovered in Saqqara, dating between the first and second century AD.
  - 8
    - An ancient shipwreck is found in the Volga river near Vinnovka, Samara, which is over 600 years old.
    - Two shipwrecks are discovered in the Baltic Sea, linked to Sweden's Vasa, dating back to the 17th century.
  - 20 – Announcements of the discoveries of:
    - A 3,000-year-old megalithic temple used by a 'water cult' at the Huaca El Toro, Oyotún District, Zaña Valley, Peru.
    - A cave lion figurine made of woolly mammoth tusk at the Denisova Cave, dating back to approximately 45,000 years ago.
  - 21 – Announcement that an 8,000-year-old monument has been found at Uğurlu-Zeytinlik, Imbros.
  - 23 – Mummified animals are announced to have been discovered a year earlier at Saqqara near Cairo, including cats, crocodiles, cobras, birds, lion cubs, and a large scarab.
  - 25 – Discovery of 45 tombs and a settlement in Al-Mudhaibi, Ash Sharqiyah, Oman, dating back to the Iron Age, is announced.
- December
  - 5 – Location of wreck of SMS Scharnhorst (sunk in the Battle of the Falkland Islands, December 1914) by a team led by Mensun Bound is reported.
  - 11 – A red granite bust of Ramesses II is discovered in Giza.
  - 12 – Dating of a cave painting of a hunting scene in Sulawesi, Indonesia, to at least 43,900 years BP, is announced. It is the oldest known example of human art.
  - 17 – Two Bronze Age tombs containing a trove of engraved jewelry and artifacts are discovered in Pylos, Greece.
  - 18
    - Discovery of an anchor in the Gulf of Mexico consistent with the fleet of Hernán Cortés is reported.
    - A 7,000-year-old wall against sea level rise is uncovered at the submerged Tel Hreiz on Carmel Coast, near Haifa, Israel.
  - 25 – Roman and Anglo-Saxon artefacts are discovered in Baginton, England.
  - 27 – An ancient slab is found in the ancient city of Hadrianopolis in Paphlagonia.
  - 30 – A hoard of gold coins dating back to the 9th century is unearthed in Yavneh, Israel, including a dinar minted during the reign of Harun al-Rashid.

== Events ==
- January 21 - A recumbent stone circle reported in December 2018 in Aberdeenshire, Scotland, thought to date from around 4,000 years BP, is shown to have been built in the 1990s.
- March 29 - Announcement that Norway will return Easter Island artefacts taken by Thor Heyerdahl fifty years ago.
- April 18 - Announcement that a bone found in 1964 at Fishbourne Roman Palace has been identified as that of a rabbit (likely a pet) from the 1st century AD, making it the oldest found in England.
- June 3 - Announcement that designated sunken materiel on the south coast of England lost in training for the 1944 Normandy landings has been scheduled for legal protection.
- July - A report by the United States National Park Service concludes that 22 archaeological sites in the Organ Pipe Cactus National Monument are threatened by the LP construction of a wall on the U.S.-Mexico border.
- July 2 - A 1,300-year old, 200 square metres (2,200 sq ft) one-piece floor mosaic, found in Hatay in 2010, is opened to visitors.
- July 22 - Announcement that a Baltic Sea wreck, first located in 2009, has been identified earlier in the year as belonging to a date around 1500 and in an excellent state of preservation.
- August 29 - Stone tools and animal bones that are 16,600 years old have been found near the Salmon River near Cottonwood, Idaho. These may be the oldest human remains found in the Americas.
- October 3 - Finland agrees to return Native American remains and other artifacts stolen in 1891 to Mesa Verde National Park in Colorado.
- October 7 - Syria places a 5th-century mosaic from the region between Hama and Idlib on display at the National Museum of Damascus after its return to the country having been smuggled to Canada in the late 1990s.
- November 11
  - Archaeologists in Iceland map shipwrecks near Eyrarbakki, which consist of 400 English, Dutch, Danish, Basque, and Icelandic vessels lost between A.D. 1200 and 1920.
  - Cadw announces that the wreck of an American Lockheed P-38 Lightning fighter which crashed in September 1942 off the coast of Wales near Harlech is the first legally designated military aircraft crash site in the United Kingdom to be scheduled for legal protection for its historic and archaeological interest.
- November 18 - Agreement Concerning the Shipwrecked Vessel RMS Titanic to give international protection to the 1912 wreck of the RMS Titanic in the North Atlantic comes into effect.
- November 21 - Welsh metal detectorists are convicted of stealing and concealing a large Viking and Anglo-Saxon coin and jewellery hoard found in June 2015 at Eye, Herefordshire on the English border.
- November 27 - A replica Anglo-Saxon house adjacent to the site of the foundations on which it is based excavated in 2016 at Long Wittenham in the Thames Valley of England is opened.

== Deaths ==
- January 13 - Miguel Civil, Sumerologist (born 1926)
- January 14 - Rainer Stadelmann, German Egyptologist (born 1933)
- January 16 - Barbara Tsakirgis, American archaeologist (born 1954)
- January 18 - Lamia Al-Gailani Werr, Iraqi archaeologist (born 1938)
- March 10 - Sebastiano Tusa, Italian archaeologist (born 1952)
- March 20 - Ralph Solecki, American archaeologist (born 1917)
- May 27 - Judith McKenzie, Australian archaeologist (born 1957)

== See also ==
- List of years in archaeology
