= History of trade and industry in Birmingham =

Aspect of history

Birmingham was a flourishing medieval market town in England.

== 11th century ==
A settlement of Birmingham appears in Domesday Book, but there is nothing to indicate that it was anything but a rural manor. It was one of many in the area that had been subinfeuded by William Fitz Osbern, Lord of Dudley. In lawsuits of 1285 and 1308 it was claimed that the Birmingham market had been held without interruption since before the Norman Conquest. However no more contemporary evidence of such a market exists.

== 12th century ==
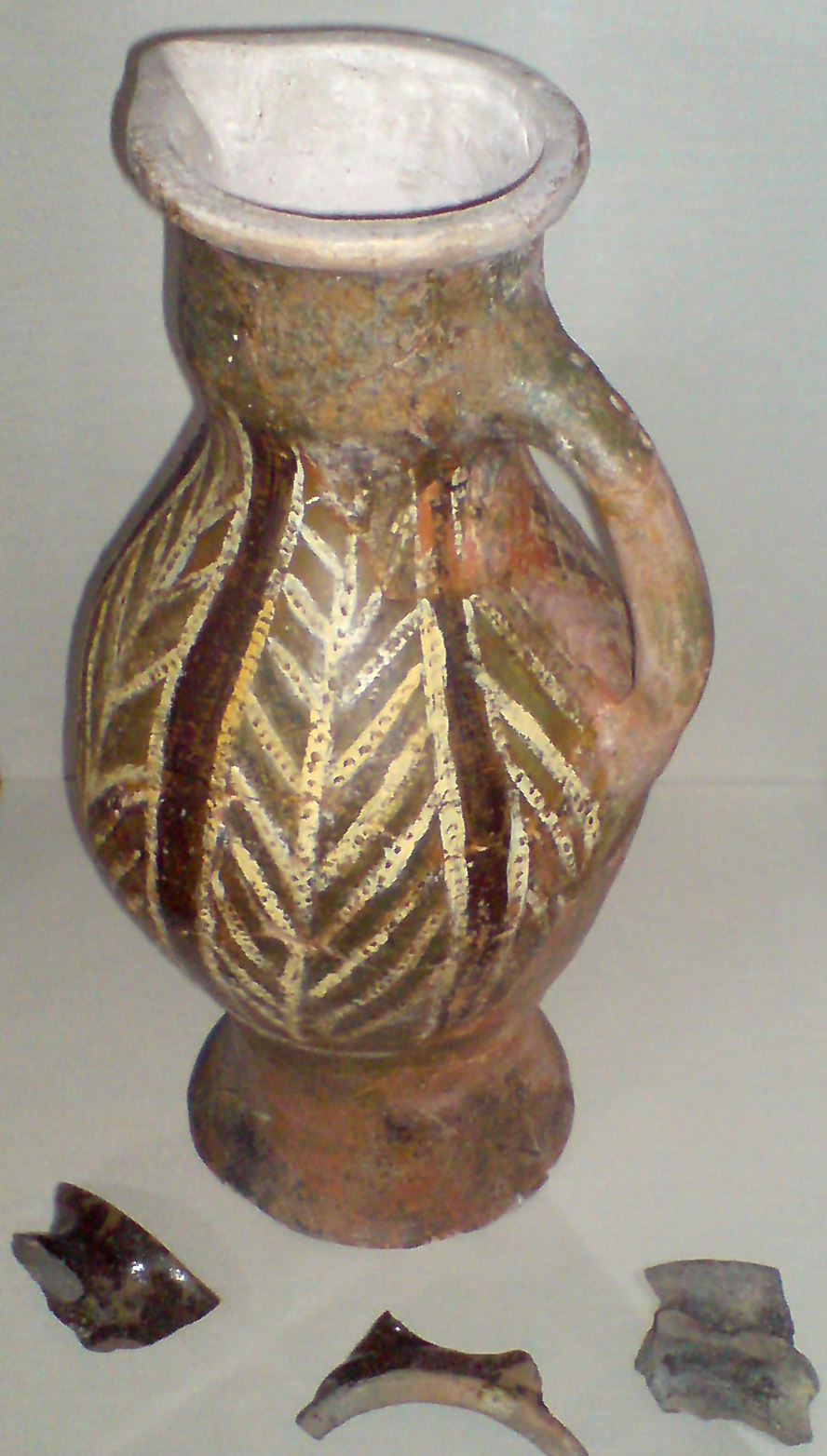
Deritend ware

The key moment in the transformation of Birmingham from the purely rural manor recorded in the Domesday Book was in 1166, with the purchase by Peter de Birmingham of a royal charter from Henry II permitting him to hold a weekly market "at his castle at Birmingham" and to charge tolls on the market's traffic – one of the earliest of the two thousand such charters granted in England in the two centuries up to 1350. With the benefit of this charter, it would seem that Peter proceeded with the deliberate creation of a planned market town.

This era saw the laying out of the triangular marketplace that became the Bull Ring; the selling of burgage plots on the surrounding frontages, granting privileges in the market and freedom from tolls; the diversion of local trade routes towards the new site and its associated crossing of the River Rea at Deritend; the rebuilding of the Birmingham Manor House in stone; and probably the first establishment of the parish church of St Martin in the Bull Ring.

Analysis of craftsmen's names in medieval records suggests that the major industries of medieval Birmingham were textiles, leather working and iron working. Archaeological evidence also suggests the presence of pottery, tile manufacture and probably the working of bone and horn.

In the following period, the new town expanded rapidly in highly favourable economic circumstances, and there is archaeological evidence of small-scale industries, such as Kilns producing the distinctive local Deritend Ware pottery.

== 13th century ==
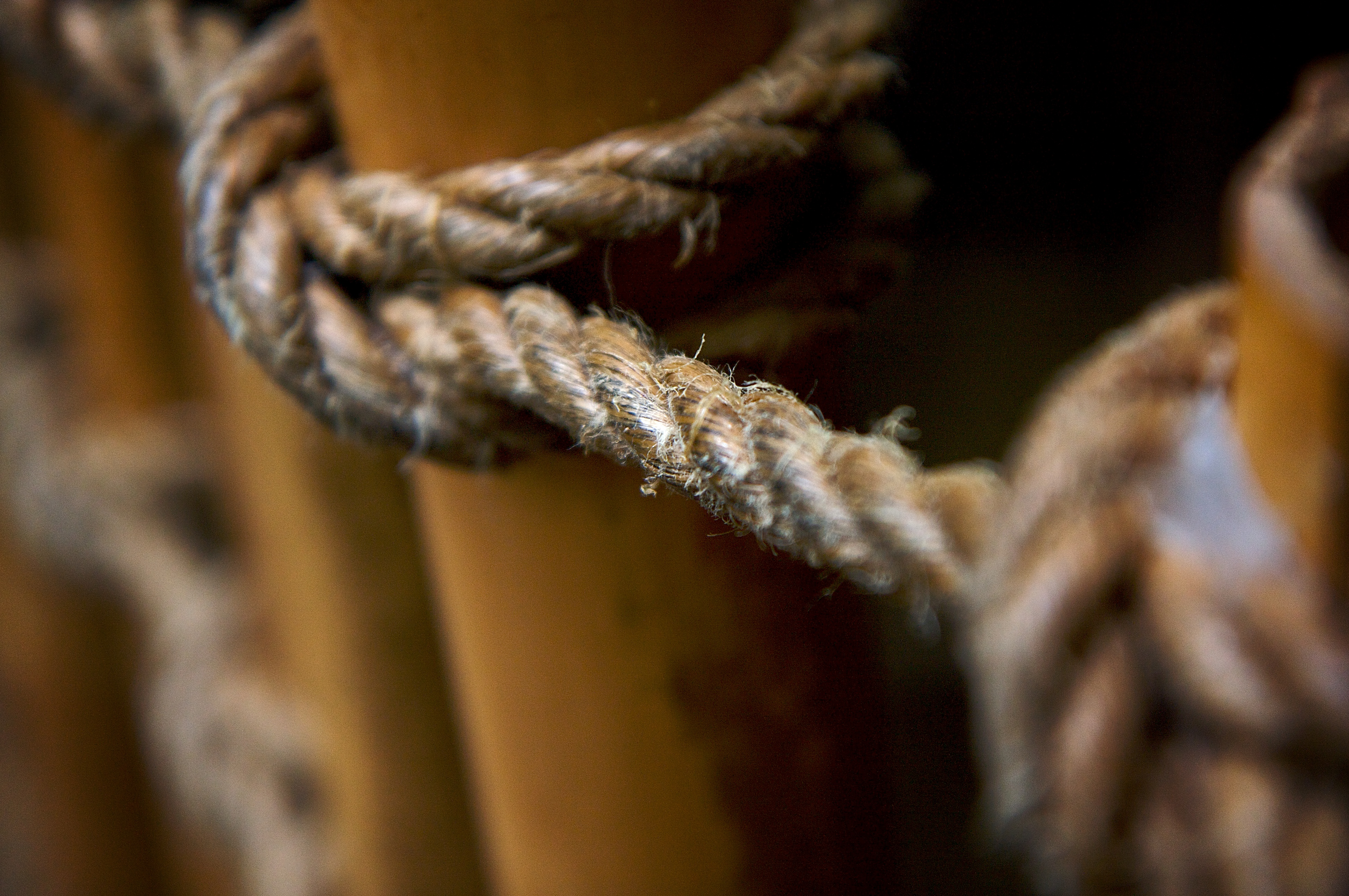
Hemp rope which would have been made in the town

The first documentary evidence of craftsmen in the town comes in 1232, when a group of burgesses negotiating to be released from their obligation to help with the Lord's haymaking is listed as including a smith, a tailor and four weavers. Manufacturing is likely to have been stimulated by the existence of the market, which provides a source of raw materials such as hides and wool as well as a demand for goods from prosperous merchants in the town and from visitors from the countryside selling produce.

Mercers and purveyors are mentioned in deeds around this time and there are tanning pits in use in Edgbaston Street; and hemp and flax are being used for making rope, canvas and linen. Kilns producing local pottery also exist. The borough rentals of 1296 provide evidence of at least four forges in the town.

References in 1285 and 1306 to stolen cattle being sold in the town suggest that the size of the animal trade at this time is sufficient for such sales to go unnoticed.

Birmingham is situated on several significant overland trade routes. By the end of the 13th century, the town is an important transit point for the trade in cattle along drovers' roads from Wales to Coventry and the South East of England.

== 14th century ==
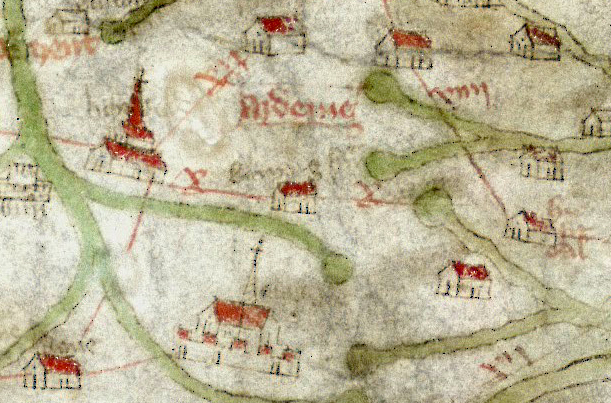
Birmingham's first cartographic representation, on the fourteenth century Gough MapThe town (centre) is shown within the Forest of Arden, on the road between Lichfield (left) and Droitwich (right). North is to the left

The land of the Birmingham Plateau, particularly the unenclosed area of the manor of Birmingham to the west of the town, is more suited to pastoral than arable agriculture; and excavated animal bones indicate that cattle were the dominant livestock, with some sheep but very few pigs. Trade through Birmingham diversified as a merchant class arose.

While most manufactured goods in Birmingham were produced for a local market, there is some evidence that the town was already a specialised and widely-recognised centre of the jewellery trade during the medieval period. An inventory of the personal possessions of the Master of the Knights Templar in England at the time of their suppression in 1308 includes 22 Birmingham Pieces: small, high value items, possibly jewellery or metal ornaments, that are sufficiently well-known to be referred to without explanation as far away as London.

By 1332 the number of craftsmen in Birmingham is similar to that of other Warwickshire towns associated with industry such as Tamworth, Henley-in-Arden, Stratford-upon-Avon, and Alcester.

Birmingham is now established as a particular centre of the wool trade. Two Birmingham merchants represent Warwickshire at the council held in York in 1322 to discuss the standardisation of wool staples, and others attend the Westminster wool merchants assemblies of 1340, 1342 and 1343, a period when at least one Birmingham merchant is trading considerable amounts of wool with continental Europe.

In 1343 three Birmingham men are punished for selling base metal items while asserting they are silver, and there is documentary evidence of goldsmiths in the town in 1384 and 1460 – a trade that could not have been supported purely through local demand in a town of Birmingham's size.

wikt:Skinners, tanners and wikt:saddlers are recorded. The presence of slag and hearth bloom in pits excavated behind Park Street also suggests the early presence of working in iron.

Four smiths are mentioned on a poll tax return of 1379 and seven more are documented in the following century. Although fifteen to twenty weavers, dyers and fullers have been identified in Birmingham up to 1347, this is not a significantly greater number of cloth-workers than that found in surrounding villages and at least some of the cloth sold on the Birmingham market had rural origins. This was the first local industry to benefit from mechanisation, however, and nearly a dozen fulling mills exist in the Birmingham area by the end of the 14th century, many converted from corn mills, but including one at Holford near Perry Barr that is purpose-built in 1358.

Aulnage records for 1397 give some indication of the size of Birmingham's textile trade at this time, the 44 broadcloths sold being a tiny fraction of the 3,000 sold in the major textile centre of Coventry, but making up almost a third of the trade of the rest of Warwickshire.

== 15th century ==
A legal dispute involving traders from Wednesbury in 1403 reveals that traders from Birmingham and dealing in iron, linen, wool, brass and "calibe" (possibly fur) as well as cattle in the town.

== 16th century ==
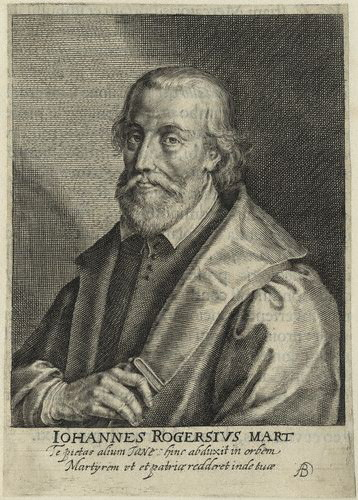
John Rogers the compiler and editor of the 1537 Matthew Bible

Birmingham's first notable literary figure is John Rogers, the compiler and editor of the 1537 Matthew Bible, parts of which he also translates. This is the first complete authorised version of the Bible to be printed in the English language and the most influential of the early English printed Bibles, providing the basis for the later Great Bible and the Authorized King James Version. Rogers' 1548 translation of Philipp Melanchthon's Weighing of the Interim, possibly translated in Deritend, is the first book by a Birmingham man known to have been printed in England.

By the early 16th century Birmingham was already a centre of metal working, for example when Henry VIII was making plans to invaded Scotland in 1523 Birmingham smithies supplied bulk orders for bodkin arrowheads for use by his army.

In 1538 churchman John Leialand passed through the Midlands and wrote:

The Beauty of Bermingham a Good Markett Towne in the extreame partes of Warwike-shire is one Street going up alonge almost from the left Ripe of the Brooke ["that rises, some say 4 or 5 miles [away] towards the Black Hilles"] up a meane Hill by the length of a Quarter of a Mile. I saw many Smithes in the Towne that use to make Knives and all mannour of cutting Tooles, and many Loriners tat make Bittes, and a great many Naylors. Soe that a great part of the Towne is maintained by Smithes whoe have their Iron (Note: "Yren out of Staffordshire and Warwikeshire and See Coale out of Staffordshire" (Leland & Hearne 1744, p. 109 footnote 2)) and Sea Cole out of Stafford-shire.

In 1547 The King's Commissioners report that the Guild of the Holy Cross are responsible "for keeping the Clocke and the Chyme" at St Martin's Church, at a cost of four shillings and four pence a year. The next recorded mention of a clock is in 1613. A survey of 1553 names one of the first goldsmiths of Birmingham, Roger Pemberton.

The principal institutions of medieval Birmingham collapse within the space of eleven years between 1536 and 1547. The Priory of St Thomas is suppressed and its property sold at the Dissolution of the Monasteries in 1536, with the Guild of the Holy Cross, the Guild of St John and their associated chantries are also disbanded in 1547. Most significantly, the de Birmingham family lose possession of the manor of Birmingham in 1536, probably as a result of a feud between Edward de Birmingham and John Sutton, 3rd Baron Dudley. After brief periods in the possession of the Crown and the Duke of Northumberland, the manor is sold in 1555 to Thomas Marrow of Berkswell. Birmingham will never again have a resident Lord of the manor, and the district as a whole remains an area of weak lordship throughout the following centuries. With local government remaining essentially manorial, the townspeople's resulting high degree of economic and social freedom is to be a highly significant factor in Birmingham's subsequent development.

== 17th century ==
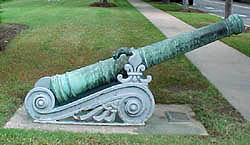
17th century European saker cannon.

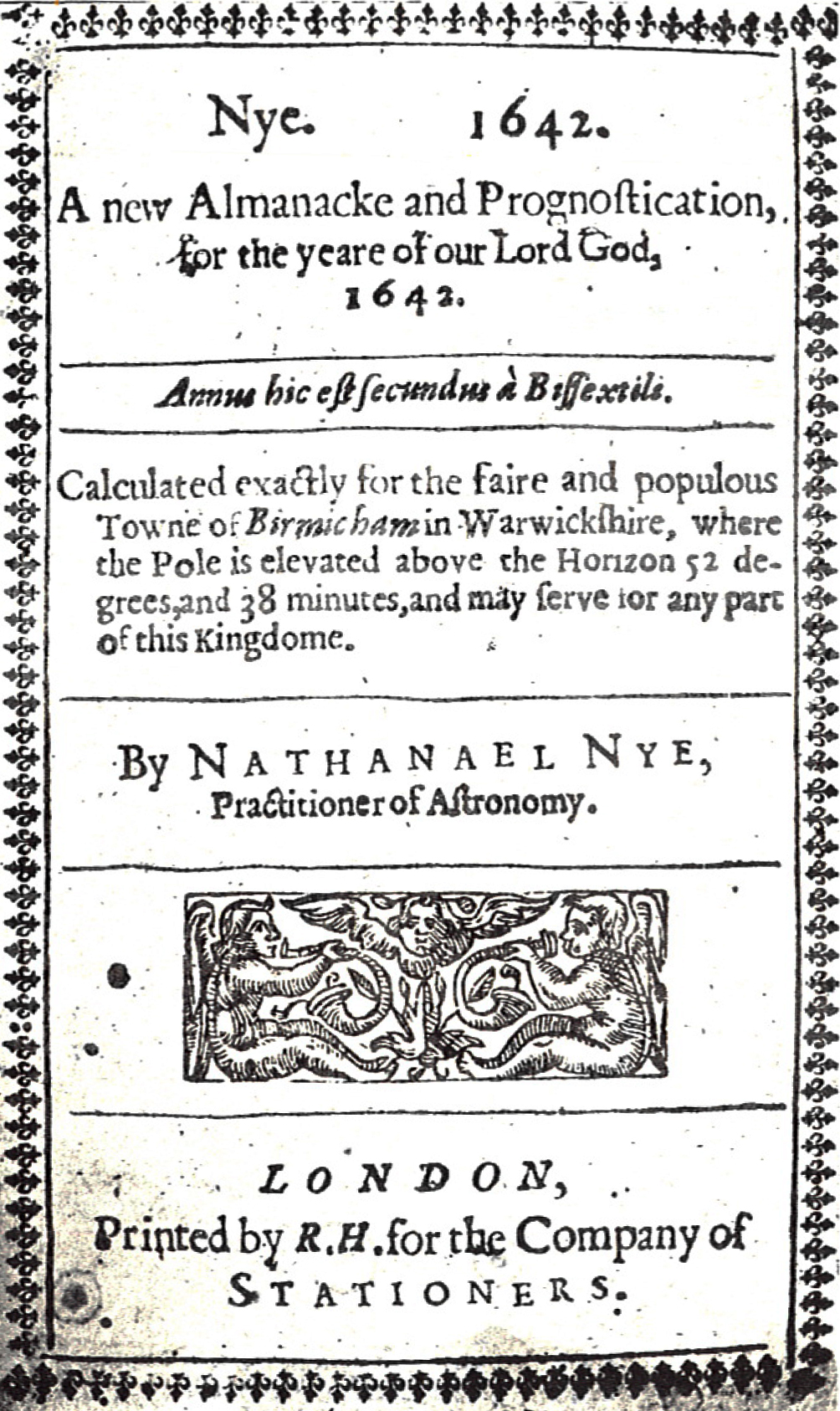
Frontispiece of Nye's New Almanacke and Prognostication for 1642

1642: The early Birmingham mathematician and astronomer Nathaniel Nye publishes A New Almanacke and Prognostication calculated exactly for the faire and populous Towne of Birmicham in Warwickshire, where the Pole is elevated above the Horizon 52 degrees and 38 minutes, and may serve for any part of this Kingdome.

Birmingham's principal tradesmen during the English Civil War were the smiths, who were called upon to manufacture over 15,000 sword blades, these are supplied to Parliamentarian forces only. One of the town's leading minds, 'Nathaniel Nye' is recorded as testing a Birmingham cannon in 1643. Nye also experimented with a saker in Deritend in 1645. From 1645 he became the master gunner to the Parliamentarian garrison at Evesham and in 1646 he successfully directs the artillery at the Siege of Worcester, detailing his experiences and in his 1647 book The Art of Gunnery, believing that war is as much a science as an art.

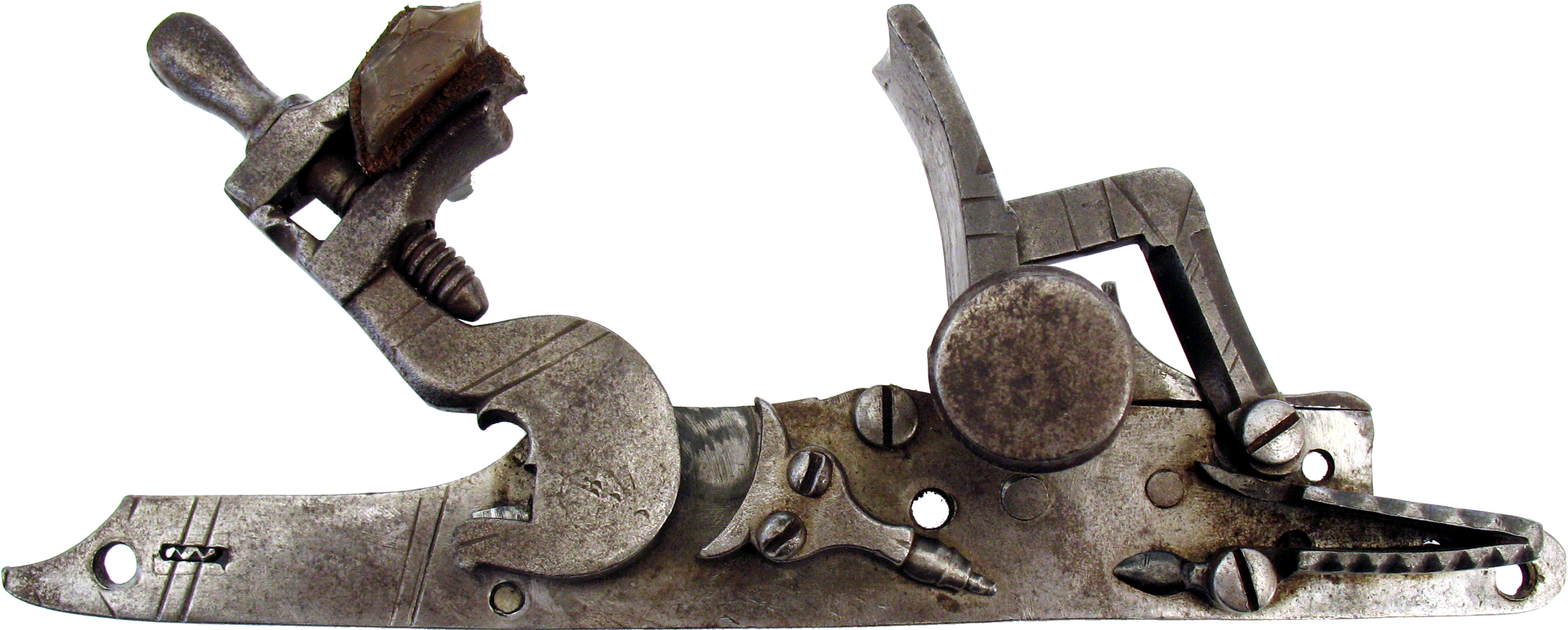
External view of a cocked 17th century snaphance lock on musket, a weapon Birmingham was selling to London.

The earliest known clockmakers in the town arrived from London in 1667. Between 1770 and 1870 there were over 700 clock and watch makers in Birmingham.

In 1689 Sir Richard Newdigate, one of the new, local Newdigate Baronets, approaches manufacturers in the town with the notion of supplying the British Government with small arms. It is stressed that they would need to be of high enough calibre to equal the small arms that were being imported from abroad. After a successful trial order in 1692, the Government places its first contract. On 5 January 1693, the "Officers of Ordnance" chooses five local firearms manufacturers to initially produce 200 "snaphance musquets" per month over the period of one year, paying 17 shillings per musket, plus 3 shillings per hundredweight for delivery to London.
