= English ship Grantham (1654) =

Warship

History

England
- Name: Grantham
- Namesake: Skirmish at Grantham, Lincolnshire in 1643
- Operator: Navy of the Commonwealth of England; Royal Navy (from 1660)
- Ordered: 1 October 1653
- Builder: Daniel Furzer, Lydney, Forest of Dean
- Launched: 1654
- Commissioned: 1654
- Renamed: Garland in 1660
- Fate: Taken to pieces in 1698

General characteristics as built 1654
- Type: 22-gun fifth rate
- Tons burthen: 26590/94 bm
- Length: 98 ft 7 in (30.0 m) (on gundeck), 80 ft 0 in (24.4 m) keel for tonnage
- Beam: 25 ft 0 in (7.6 m) for tonnage
- Draught: 12 ft (3.7 m)
- Depth of hold: 10 ft 0 in (3.0 m)
- Sail plan: ship-rigged
- Complement: 100 in 1660, 110 in 1666, 150 by 1673
- Armament: As built 1654; 18 x demi-culverins (UD); 4 x sakers (QD)

Grantham was a fifth-rate warship of the Commonwealth of England's naval forces, one of six such ships built under the 1653 Programme (the others were Islip, Colchester, Fagons, Selby, and Basing). She was built by contract with Master Shipwright Daniel Furzer at his yard at Lydney in the Forest of Dean, and was launched during 1654 as a 22-gun Fifth rate. She was named Grantham to commemorate a skirmish near that town on 13 May 1643 in which Colonel Oliver Cromwell's cavalry routed a Royalist force.

Her length was recorded as 98 feet 7 inches (30.0 metres) on the gundeck and 80 feet 0 inches (24.4 metres) on the keel for tonnage calculation. The breadth was 25 feet 0 inches (7.6 metres) with a depth in hold of 10 ft 0 in (3.0 m). The tonnage was thus calculated at 26590/94 bm tons.

She was originally armed with 22 guns, comprising 18 demi-culverins on the single gundeck and 4 sakers on the quarterdeck. At the Restoration in 1660 she was taken into the Royal Navy and renamed as HMS Guardland (the name was later rendered as Garland). By 1665 she actually carried 28 guns, comprising 16 demi-culverins on the gundeck and 12 sakers on the quarterdeck (and by 1685 had additionally acquired 4 saker cutts and 2 3-pounders to give her a final total of 34 guns). The Guernsey took part during the Second Anglo-Dutch War in the Battle of Lowestoft in 1665 and in the attack on Dutch shipping in the Vlie ("Holmes's Bonfire") during 1666. In 1671 she took part in the Battle of Bugia on 8 May 1671. The Garland was converted into a fireship in August 1688, but was restored to being a Fifth rate in 1689. She was finally sold to be taken to pieces on 13 May 1698.
