= English ship Basing (1654) =

Warship

History

England
- Name: Basing
- Namesake: Basing House, Hampshire
- Operator: Navy of the Commonwealth of England; Royal Navy (from 1660)
- Ordered: 1 October 1653
- Builder: Jonas Shish, Walberswick, Suffolk
- Launched: 26 April 1654
- Commissioned: 1654
- Renamed: Guernsey in 1660
- Fate: Sunk as a foundation 1694

General characteristics as built 1654
- Type: 22-gun fifth rate
- Tons burthen: 25540/94 bm
- Length: 91 ft 0 in (27.7 m) (on gundeck), 80 ft 0 in (24.4 m) keel for tonnage
- Beam: 24 ft 6 in (7.5 m) for tonnage
- Draught: 12 ft (3.7 m)
- Depth of hold: 10 ft 0 in (3.0 m)
- Sail plan: ship-rigged
- Complement: 100 in 1660, 110 in 1666, 130 in 1673
- Armament: As built 1654; 18 x demi-culverins (UD); 4 x sakers (QD)

Basing was a fifth-rate warship of the Commonwealth of England's naval forces, one of six such ships built under the 1653 Programme (the others were Islip, Colchester, Fagons, Selby, and Grantham). She was built by contract with Master Shipwright Jonas Shish at his yard at Walberswick (near Southwold), Suffolk, and was launched on 26 April 1654 as a 22-gun Fifth rate. She was named Basing after the victory of Parliamentary forces under Oliver Cromwell in capturing the house of that name in Hampshire in 1645 after a protracted siege.

Her length was recorded as 91 feet 6 inches (27.9 metres) on the gundeck and 80 feet 0 inches (24.4 metres) on the keel for tonnage calculation. The breadth was 24 feet 6 inches (7.5 metres) with a depth in hold of 10 ft 0 in (3.0 m). The tonnage was thus calculated at 25540/94 bm tons.

She was originally armed with 22 guns, comprising 18 demi-culverins on the single gundeck and 4 sakers on the quarterdeck. At the Restoration in 1660 she was taken into the Royal Navy and renamed as HMS Guernsey. By 1665 she actually carried 26 guns, comprising 16 demi-culverins on the gundeck and 10 sakers on the quarterdeck. The Guernsey took part during the Second Anglo-Dutch War in the Battle of Lowestoft and the Battle of Vagen during 1665. In the Third Anglo-Dutch War she fought at the Battle of Texel in 1673. She was finally taken to pieces in 1693.
