= English ship Colchester (1654) =

Warship

History

England
- Name: Colchester
- Operator: Navy of the Commonwealth of England; Royal Navy (from 1660)
- Ordered: 1 October 1653
- Builder: Henry Edgar, Great Yarmouth
- Launched: 23 February 1654
- Commissioned: 1654
- Fate: Sunk in action 1667

General characteristics as built 1654
- Type: 24-gun fifth rate
- Tons burthen: 2877/94 bm
- Length: 83 ft 0 in (25.3 m) keel for tonnage
- Beam: 25 ft 6 in (7.8 m) for tonnage
- Draught: 12 ft (3.7 m)
- Depth of hold: 11 ft 0 in (3.4 m)
- Sail plan: ship-rigged
- Complement: 100 in 1660, 110 in 1666, 125 in 1667
- Armament: As built 1654; 18 x demi-culverins (UD); 6 x sakers (QD)

Colchester was a fifth-rate warship of the Commonwealth of England's naval forces, one of six such ships built under the 1653 Programme (the others were Islip, Fagons, Selby, Basing, and Grantham). She was built by contract with Master Shipwright Henry Edgar at his yard at Great Yarmouth, Norfolk, and was launched on 23 February 1654 as a 24-gun fifth rate. She was named Colchester to commemorate the attack on that town by Parliamentary forces under Thomas Fairfax in 1648 during the Civil War.

Her length on the keel was recorded as 83 feet (25.3 metres) for tonnage calculation. The breadth was 25 feet 6 inches (7.8 metres) with a depth in hold of 11 ft 0 in (3.4 m). The tonnage was thus calculated at 2877/94 bm tons.

She was originally armed with 24 guns, comprising 18 demi-culverins on the single gundeck and 6 sakers on the quarterdeck. She took part in the Battle of Santa Cruz de Tenerife (1657) as part of Blake's fleet. At the Restoration in 1660 she was taken into the Royal Navy as HMS Colchester. By 1665 she actually carried 28 guns, comprising 18 demi-culverins on the gundeck, and 10 sakers on the quarterdeck. In the Second Anglo-Dutch War she took part in the Battle of Lowestoft in June 1665, capturing the VOC ship Nagelboom. She was in the Caribbean in 1667 under Captain Arthur Laugharne when she was attacked and sunk on 24 March off Saint Kitts by the French Armes d'Angleterre (originally the English Coventry).

== Bibliography ==
- Rif Winfield (2009), British Warships in the Age of Sail 1603 – 1714, by Rif Winfield, published by Seaforth Publishing, England © 2009, ISBN 978-1-84832-040-6, EPUB ISBN 978-1-78346-924-6, Chapter 5, The Fifth Rates
- Jim Colledge, Ships of the Royal Navy, by James J. Colledge, revised and updated by Lt Cdr Ben Warlow and Steve Bush, published by Seaforth Publishing, Barnsley, Great Britain, © 2020, EPUB ISBN 978-1-5267-9328-7.
