= English ship Oxford (1656) =

Warship

History

England
- Name: Oxford
- Namesake: Siege of Oxford, 1646
- Operator: Navy of the Commonwealth of England; Royal Navy (from 1660)
- Ordered: 28 December 1654
- Builder: Manley Callis, Deptford Dockyard
- Launched: November 1656
- Commissioned: 1656
- Fate: Blown up by accident in 1669

General characteristics as built 1656
- Type: 20-gun fifth rate
- Tons burthen: 22056/94 bm
- Length: 72 ft 0 in (21.9 m) keel for tonnage
- Beam: 24 ft 0 in (7.3 m) for tonnage
- Draught: 11 ft (3.4 m)
- Depth of hold: 10 ft 0 in (3.0 m)
- Sail plan: ship-rigged
- Complement: 100 in 1660, 110 in 1666
- Armament: As built 1656; 16 x demi-culverins (UD); 6 x sakers (QD)

Oxford was a fifth-rate warship of the Commonwealth of England's naval forces, one of six such ships ordered on 28 December 1654, all six built in the state dockyards (the others were Pembroke, Dartmouth, Norwich, Wakefield, and Cheriton). She was built by Master Shipwright Manley Callis at Deptford Dockyard, and was launched in November 1656 (by Order of 6 November) as a 22-gun Fifth rate. She was named Oxford to commemorate the Roundhead victory at the capture of that city in 1646.

Her length was recorded as 72 feet 0 inches (21.9 metres) on the keel for tonnage calculation. The breadth was 24 feet 0 inches (7.3 metres) with a depth in hold of 10 ft 0 in (3.0 m). The tonnage was thus calculated at 22056/94 bm tons.

She was originally armed with 22 guns, probably comprising 16 demi-culverins on the single gundeck and 6 sakers on the quarterdeck. At the Restoration in 1660 she was taken into the Royal Navy as HMS Oxford. By 1666 she was officially rated at 24 guns (16 demi-culverins and 8 sakers), but actually carried 34 guns, comprising 21 demi-culverins, 2 sakers, 5 minions and 6 3-pounders. The Oxford took part during the Second Anglo-Dutch War in the Battle of Lowestoft in 1665.

At the start of 1669 the Oxford, leased to the Governor of Jamaica for a privateering raid to be led by pirate captain Henry Morgan, was in a bay off the Île-à-Vache (off western Hispaniola) when on 2 January she was destroyed in an explosion of unknown cause in which over 200 men died, with only 10 survivors (the latter including Henry Morgan).
