= English ship Dartmouth (1655) =

Royal Navy warship

Coordinates: 56.5064°N 5.6957°W

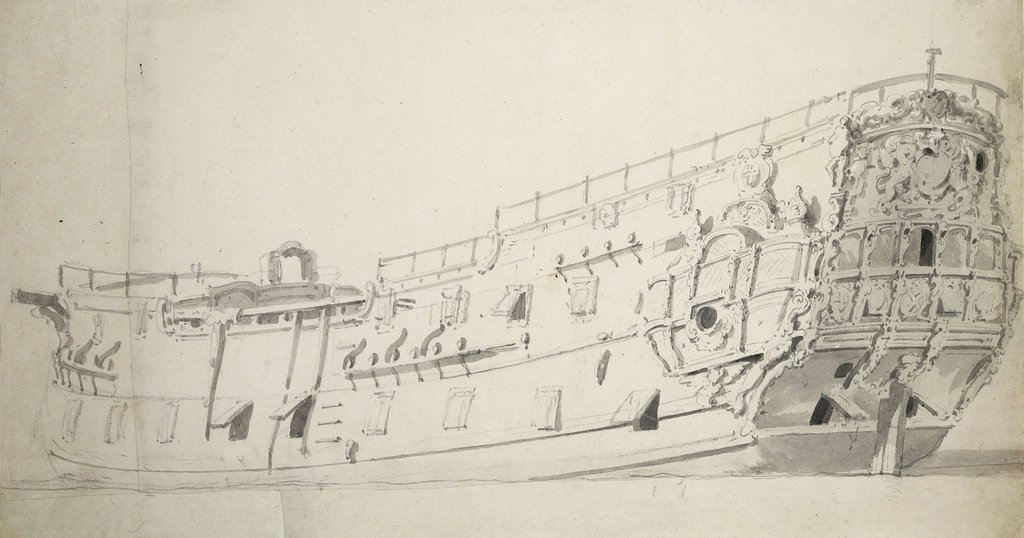
- A fifth-rate warship being refitted, sketched by Willem van de Velde the Younger, believed to be Dartmouth

History

England
- Name: Dartmouth
- Operator: Navy of the Commonwealth of England; Royal Navy (from 1660)
- Ordered: 28 December 1654
- Builder: Portsmouth Dockyard
- Cost: £1,693-5-0d
- Launched: 22 September 1655
- Commissioned: 1655
- Fate: Wrecked 9 October 1690

General characteristics
- Class & type: 22-gun fifth-rate frigate
- Tons burthen: 26062/94 tons bm
- Length: 80 ft (24.4 m) (keel)
- Beam: 24 ft 9 in (7.5 m)
- Draught: 12 ft (3.7 m)
- Depth of hold: 10 ft (3.0 m)
- Propulsion: Sails
- Sail plan: Full-rigged ship
- Complement: 100 in 1660, 110 in 1666, 135 in 1685
- Armament: As built 1655; 18 x demi-culverins (UD); 4 x sakers (QD); raised subsequently in stages to 36 guns

The Dartnouth was a fifth-rate warship of the Commonwealth of England's naval forces, one of six such ships ordered on 28 December 1654, all six from the state dockyards (the others were Norwich, Pembroke, Cheriton, Wakefield, and Oxford). She was built by Master Shipwright John Tippetts at Portsmouth Dockyard, and was launched on 22 September 1655 as a 22-gun fifth rate. She cost £1.693-5-od to build (or £6.10.0d per ton for a total of 2601/2 tons bm. She was named Dartmouth to commemorate the capture of that town by Parliamentary forces under Thomas Fairfax in January 1646.

Her length was recorded as 80 feet 0 inches (24.4 metres) on the keel for tonnage calculation. The breadth was 24 feet 9 inches (7.5 metres) with a depth in hold of 10 ft 0 in (3.0 m). The tonnage was thus calculated at 26062/94 bm tons.

She was originally armed with 22 guns, comprising 18 demi-culverins on the single gundeck and 4 sakers on the quarterdeck. At the Restoration in 1660 she was taken into the Royal Navy as HMS Dartmouth. By 1665 she actually carried 28 guns, comprising the 18 demi-culverins on the gundeck, and 10 sakers on the quarterdeck.

== Design ==
The Dartmouth was one of a number of ships built for Commonwealth of England by John Tippetts, Master Shipwright at Portsmouth Dockyard from 1650 to 1668. Tippetts learned his trade working in Denmark, which employed Dutch ship-building techniques; the archaeological survey indicates these were used to build Dartmouth, the only known English example of such a ship.

== Service ==
=== Anglo-Dutch Wars ===
On April 1666, in the Second Anglo-Dutch War, Dartmouth together with the larger (fourth-rate) frigate Sapphire and the 12-gun Little Gift, captured three Dutch armed merchant ships off the coast of Ireland.

On 28 May 1672, Dartmouth took part in the Battle of Solebay, the opening battle of the Third Anglo-Dutch War.

=== Barbary Pirates ===
In 1676–1677, Dartmouth served in the Mediterranean against the Barbary Pirates. She was part of Rear Admiral John Narborough's squadron, which fought pirates based in Tripoli and in Algiers.

=== Williamite-Jacobite wars ===
On 1 May 1689, Dartmouth, by now with an armament of 36 guns, took part in the Battle of Bantry Bay, in which a fleet of 24 French war ships, covering the landing of equipment for Irish Jacobite forces in the south-west of Ireland, fought 19 English war ships. The French had the better of the battle, badly damaging the English ships, but failed to press their advantage.

Later that year, Dartmouth, commanded by Captain John Leake, participated in the relief of the Siege of Derry. The town of Derry, which lies on the River Foyle near its mouth on Lough Foyle, was besieged by supporters of James II of England and defended by northern Irish Protestants supporting King William.

In May and June 1689 Dartmouth escorted a convoy from England to Ireland that brought a relief force, commanded by Major-General Percy Kirke, destined for Derry. On 17 May 1689, the convoy sailed from Liverpool with 24 transport ships, escorted by three men-of-war - HMS Swallow, HMS Bonaventure, and HMS Dartmouth. The fleet, carrying four battalions (about 2000 men), arrived in Lough Foyle early in June.

As the access to Derry from Lough Foyle by the river was defended by shore batteries and blocked by a boom across the river, Kirke did not dare use this route to approach the town. However, a desperate last-minute attempt succeeded on the 28 July. The Dartmouth engaged the shore batteries, while the armed merchant ship Mountjoy rammed and breached the boom. The Mountjoy and another armed merchant, the Phoenix, forced their way past the defences and relieved the siege.

In 1690, Dartmouth was employed in operations along the west coast of Scotland against Jacobite rebels. On 9 October, Dartmouth and two other smaller ships were sent to persuade the MacLeans of Duart to sign Articles of Allegiance to William III and Mary II. They encountered a heavy storm whilst in the Sound of Mull, and anchored to ride out the poor weather. Dartmouth was driven onto rocks and wrecked, with the loss of most of her crew, including her commanding officer, Edward Pottinger.

== Discovery of the Wreck ==
Location of the wreck of HMS Dartmouth in Argyll and Bute.

In 1973, divers from Bristol discovered a wreck on the north coast of Eilean Rudha an Ridire, an island in the Sound of Mull. A recovered brass ship's bell confirmed the wreck as the Dartmouth. The site underwent three years of archaeological survey. Twenty iron guns were identified, and parts of the ship's hull were recovered for closer examination. A varied selection of 17th century military, navigational, medical and domestic items were also recovered. The archaeological study supported traditional accounts of the ship's wrecking, and revealed that parts of Dartmouth's construction differed from conventional methods used during the period.

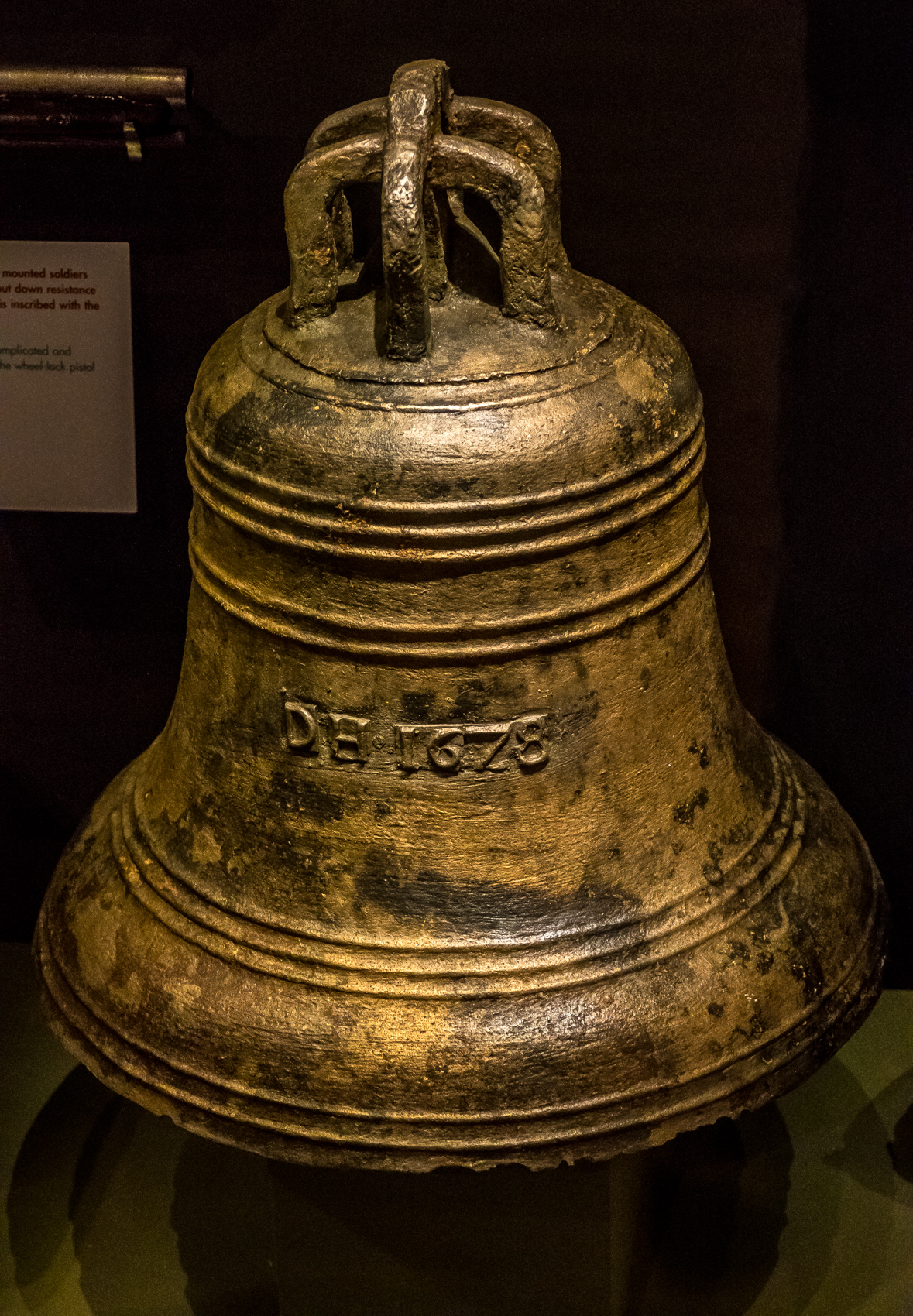
Dartmouth's brass bell

On 11 April 1974, the wrecksite was one of the first to be designated under the Protection of Wrecks Act. It was redesignated on 25 June 1992. The site became a Historic Maritime Protected Area in 2013.

== Sources ==
- Adnams, John R. (1974). "The Dartmouth, a British frigate wrecked off Mull, 1690" (PDF). The International Journal of Nautical Archaeology and Underwater Exploration. 3 (2): 269–274. doi:10.1111/j.1095-9270.1974.tb00883.x.
- Clowes, William Laird (1898). The Royal Navy: A History from the Earliest Times to the Present. Vol. 2. London: Sampson Low, Marston and Company.
- Hemingway, James Peter (2002). A comparative study of naval architecture between 1672 and 1755 (PDF). University of Bristol PHD Thesis.
- Colledge, J.J.; Warlow, Ben (2010). Ships of the Royal Navy: The Complete Record of all Fighting Ships of the Royal Navy from the 15th Century to the Present. Newbury, UK: Casemate. p. 103. ISBN 978-1-935149-07-1.
- Rodger, N. A. M. (2006). The Command of the Ocean: A Naval History of Britain, 1649–1815. London: Penguin. ISBN 978-0-141-02690-9.
- Winfield, Rif (2009). British Warships in the Age of Sail 1603-1714: Design, Construction, Careers and Fates. Seaforth Publishing. ISBN 978-1-84832-040-6.
- Advisory Committee on Historic Wrecks Report for 1999-2000
