= English ship Selby (1654) =

Warship

History

England
- Name: Selby
- Namesake: Battle of Selby
- Operator: Navy of the Commonwealth of England; Royal Navy (from 1660)
- Ordered: 1 October 1653
- Builder: Captain John Taylor, Wapping
- Launched: 22 April 1654
- Commissioned: 1654
- Renamed: Eagle in 1660
- Fate: Sunk as a foundation 1694

General characteristics as built 1654
- Type: 22-gun fifth rate
- Tons burthen: 29956/94 bm
- Length: 85 ft 6 in (26.1 m) keel for tonnage
- Beam: 25 ft 8 in (7.8 m) for tonnage
- Draught: 12 ft (3.7 m)
- Depth of hold: 10 ft 0 in (3.0 m)
- Sail plan: ship-rigged
- Complement: 100 in 1660, 110 in 1666, 135 in 1667
- Armament: As built 1654; 18 x demi-culverins (UD); 4 x sakers (QD)

Selby was a fifth-rate warship of the Commonwealth of England's naval forces, one of six such ships built under the 1653 Programme (the others were Islip, Colchester, Fagons, Basing, and Grantham). She was built by contract with Master Shipwright Captain John Taylor at his yard at Wapping, London, and was launched on 22 April 1654 as a 22-gun Fifth rate. She was named Selby after the victory of Parliamentary forces under Thomas Fairfax in capturing that town in 1644.

Her length on the keel was recorded as 85 feet 6 inches (26.1 metres) for tonnage calculation. The breadth was 25 feet 8 inches (7.8 metres) with a depth in hold of 10 ft 0 in (3.0 m). The tonnage was thus calculated at 29956/94 bm tons.

She was originally armed with 22 guns, comprising 18 demi-culverins on the single gundeck and 4 sakers on the quarterdeck. At the Restoration in 1660 she was taken into the Royal Navy and renamed as HMS Eagle. By 1665 she actually carried 26 guns, comprising 16 demi-culverins on the gundeck and 10 sakers on the quarterdeck. She was converted into a fireship in 1674, and subsequently served as a guardship. In 1694 she was sunk as a foundation (breakwater) at Sheerness Dockyard.
