= English ship Forrester =

Warship

History

England
- Name: Forrester
- Operator: Navy of the Commonwealth of England; Royal Navy (from 1660)
- Ordered: 10 July 1656
- Builder: Daniel Furzer, Lydney, Forest of Dean
- Launched: 3 September 1657
- Commissioned: 1657
- Fate: Blown up by accident 1672

General characteristics as built 1657
- Type: 22-gun fifth rate
- Tons burthen: 26590/94 bm
- Length: 80 ft 0 in (24.4 m) keel for tonnage
- Beam: 25 ft 0 in (7.6 m) for tonnage
- Depth of hold: 10 ft 6 in (3.2 m)
- Sail plan: ship-rigged
- Complement: 100 in 1660, 110 in 1666
- Armament: As built 1657; 18 x demi-culverins (UD); 4 x sakers (QD)

Forrester was a fifth-rate warship of the Commonwealth of England's naval forces, one of two such ships built under the 1656 Programme (the other was Bradford). The two ships were authorised to be built on 8 April 1656 to be built in the state dockyards at Portsmouth and Deptford, but on 10 July the Council of State directed that the two should be built in the Forest of Dean, "to make the experiment of building frigates in the Forest" (this is probably the reason for the ship's name).

The Admiralty Committee on 13 August that the first should be built under contract with Master Shipwright Daniel Furzer at Lydney Pill (the second was later awarded to Portsmouth Dockyard), and she was launched on 3 September 1657. Her length on the keel was 80 feet (24.4 metres) for tonnage calculation. The breadth was 25 feet (7.6 metres) with a depth in hold of 10 ft 6 in (3.2 m). The tonnage was thus 26590/94 bm tons. She was completed at an initial contract cost of £1,592.10.0d (Note: The cost accounting for inflation of approximately £258,700 in reference to today.) (or £6.10.0d per ton for the originally intended 245 tons bm).

She was originally armed with 22 guns, comprising 18 demi-culverins on the single gundeck and 4 sakers on the quarterdeck. In 1660 the Forrester was taken into the new Royal Navy. By 1665 she actually carried 32 guns, comprising 20 demi-culverins and 12 sakers. In the Second Anglo-Dutch War she took part in the Battle of Lowestoft in June 1665. In the Third Anglo-Dutch War she participated in the Battle of Solebay on 28 May 1672. On 18 November 1672 the Forrester was at Leghorn (Livorno) under Captain Robert Stout, who had just gone ashore when the ship was destroyed by a massive explosion of unknown cause.
