= English ship Pembroke (1655) =

History

England
- Name: Pembroke
- Namesake: Philip Herbert, 4th Earl of Pembroke
- Operator: Navy of the Commonwealth of England; Royal Navy (from 1660)
- Ordered: 28 December 1654
- Builder: Samuel Raven, Woolwich Dockyard
- Launched: September 1655
- Commissioned: 1655
- Fate: Foundered following collision in 1667

General characteristics as built 1655
- Type: 22-gun fifth rate
- Tons burthen: 26926/94 bm
- Length: 81 ft 0 in (24.7 m) keel for tonnage
- Beam: 25 ft 0 in (7.6 m) for tonnage
- Draught: 12 ft (3.7 m)
- Depth of hold: 11 ft 0 in (3.4 m)
- Sail plan: ship-rigged
- Complement: 100 in 1660 and 1666, 110 by 1667
- Armament: As built 1655; 18 x demi-culverins (UD); 4 x sakers (QD)

Pembroke was a fifth-rate warship of the Commonwealth of England's naval forces, one of six such ships ordered on 28 December 1654, all six from the state dockyards (the others were Norwich, Dartmouth, Cheriton, Wakefield, and Oxford). She was built by Master Shipwright Samuel Raven at Woolwich Dockyard, and was launched in September 1655 as a 22-gun fifth rate. She was named Pembroke after Philip Herbert, 4th Earl of Pembroke.

Her length was recorded as 81 feet 0 inches (24.7 metres) on the keel for tonnage calculation. The breadth was 25 feet 0 inches (7.6 metres) with a depth in hold of 11 ft 0 in (3.4 m). The tonnage was thus calculated at 26926/94 bm tons.

She was originally armed with 22 guns, comprising 18 demi-culverins on the single gundeck and 4 sakers on the quarterdeck. At the Restoration in 1660 she was taken into the Royal Navy as HMS Pembroke. By 1665 she actually carried 28 guns, comprising 20 demi-culverins on the gundeck, and 8 sakers on the quarterdeck. The Pembroke took part during the Second Anglo-Dutch War in the Battle of Lowestoft and the Battle of Vagen in 1665 and in the attack on Dutch shipping in the Vlie ("Holmes's Bonfire") during 1666. On 10 May 1667 she foundered in Tor Bay following a collision with Fairfax.
