= English ship Cheriton (1656) =

Warship

History

England
- Name: Cheriton
- Namesake: Battle of Cheriton, 1644
- Operator: Navy of the Commonwealth of England; Royal Navy (from 1660)
- Ordered: 28 December 1654
- Builder: Manley Callis, Deptford Dockyard
- Launched: 16 April 1656
- Commissioned: 1655
- Renamed: HMS Speedwell (in 1660)
- Fate: Wrecked in 1676

General characteristics as built 1656
- Type: 20-gun fifth rate
- Tons burthen: 23280/94 bm
- Length: 76 ft 0 in (23.2 m) keel for tonnage
- Beam: 24 ft 0 in (7.3 m) for tonnage
- Draught: 11 ft (3.4 m)
- Depth of hold: 9 ft 0 in (2.7 m)
- Sail plan: ship-rigged
- Complement: 90 in 1660, 100 in 1666, 125 by 1676
- Armament: As built 1655; 16 x demi-culverins (UD); 4 x sakers (QD)

Cheriton was a fifth-rate warship of the Commonwealth of England's naval forces, one of six such ships ordered on 28 December 1654, all 6 built in the state dockyards (the others were Pembroke, Dartmouth, Norwich, Wakefield, and Oxford). She was built by Master Shipwright Manley Callis at Deptford Dockyard, and was launched on 16 April 1656 as a 20-gun Fifth rate. She was named Cheriton to commemorate the Roundhead victory at the Battle of Cheriton in 1644.

Her length was recorded as 76 feet 0 inches (23.2 metres) on the keel for tonnage calculation. The breadth was 24 feet 0 inches (7.3 metres) with a depth in hold of 9 ft 0 in (2.7 m). The tonnage was thus calculated at 23280/94 bm tons.

She was originally armed with 20 guns, comprising 16 demi-culverins on the single gundeck and 4 sakers on the quarterdeck. At the Restoration in 1660 she was taken into the Royal Navy and renamed as HMS Speedwell. By 1665 she actually carried 26 guns, comprising the 16 demi-culverins on the gundeck, and now with 10 sakers on the quarterdeck. The Speedwell took part during the Second Anglo-Dutch War in the Battle of Lowestoft in 1665 In the spring of 1676 the Speedwell was sent on a voyage of Arctic exploration to seek the North East Passage under Captain John Wood, but on 29 June she ran ashore on the coast of Novaya Zemlya island, and was broken up by the pounding surf.
