= English ship Norwich (1655) =

Warship

History

England
- Name: Norwich
- Operator: Navy of the Commonwealth of England; Royal Navy (from 1660)
- Ordered: 28 December 1654
- Builder: Phineas Pett, Chatham Dockyard
- Launched: 11 September 1655
- Commissioned: 1655
- Fate: Bilged and run ashore in 1682

General characteristics as built 1655
- Type: 22-gun fifth rate
- Tons burthen: 26590/94 bm
- Length: 80 ft 0 in (24.4 m) keel for tonnage
- Beam: 25 ft 0 in (7.6 m) for tonnage
- Draught: 12 ft (3.7 m)
- Depth of hold: 10 ft 6 in (3.2 m)
- Sail plan: ship-rigged
- Complement: 100 in 1660 and 1666, 160 by 1673, later reduced
- Armament: As built 1655; 18 x demi-culverins (UD); 4 x sakers (QD)

Norwich was a fifth-rate warship of the Commonwealth of England's naval forces, one of six such ships ordered on 28 December 1654, all six built in the state dockyards (the others were Pembroke, Dartmouth, Cheriton, Wakefield, and Oxford). She was built by Master Shipwright Phineas Pett at Chatham Dockyard, and was launched on 11 September 1655 as a 22-gun fifth rate. She was named Norwich to commemorate the funding raised by subscription from the girls of that city to arm the 11th Troop of Oliver Cromwell's New Model Army.

Her length was recorded as 80 feet 0 inches (24.4 metres) on the keel for tonnage calculation. The breadth was 25 feet 0 inches (7.6 metres) with a depth in hold of 10 ft 6 in (3.2 m). The tonnage was thus calculated at 26590/94 bm tons.

She was originally armed with 22 guns, comprising 18 demi-culverins on the single gundeck and 4 sakers on the quarterdeck. At the Restoration in 1660 she was taken into the Royal Navy as HMS Norwich. By 1665 she actually carried 26 guns, comprising 18 demi-culverins on the gundeck, and 6 sakers on the quarterdeck, together with 2 3-pounders. The Norwich took part during the Second Anglo-Dutch War in the Battle of Lowestoft and the Battle of Vagen in 1665 and in the Battle of Nevis and Battle of Martinique during 1667. On 19 June 1682 she bilged off Port Royal, Jamaica, was freed but then run ashore to prevent foundering, and later abandoned on 26 June.
