= English ship Islip =

Warship

History

England
- Name: Isklip
- Namesake: Islip, Northamptonshire
- Operator: Navy of the Commonwealth of England; Royal Navy (from 1660)
- Ordered: 1 October 1653
- Builder: Francis Bayley, Bristol
- Launched: 25 March 1654
- Commissioned: 1654
- Fate: Wrecked 24 July 1655

General characteristics as built 1654
- Type: 22-gun fifth rate
- Sail plan: ship-rigged
- Complement: 100 in 1654
- Armament: As built 1654; 18 x demi-culverins (UD); 4 x sakers (QD)

Islip was a fifth-rate warship of the Commonwealth of England's naval forces, one of six such ships built under the 1653 Programme (the others were Colchester, Fagons, Selby, Basing, and Grantham). She was built by contract with shipwright Francis Bayley at his yard at Bristol, and was launched on 25 March 1654 as a 22-gun fifth rate. She was named Islip to commemorate the victory at that Northamptonshire village over Royalist forces by Parliamentary forces under Oliver Cromwell in 1645 during the Civil War.

There is no record of her tonnage or dimensions. She was armed with 22 guns, comprising 18 demi-culverins on the single gundeck and 4 sakers on the quarterdeck. She was commissioned shortly after completion under Captain Edward Tarleton, but was wrecked the next year off Inverlochy (Lough Linnhe) on 24 July 1655.
