= English ship Wakefield =

Warship

History

England
- Name: Wakefield
- Namesake: Battle of Wakefield, 1643
- Operator: Navy of the Commonwealth of England; Royal Navy (from 1660)
- Ordered: 28 December 1654
- Builder: John Tippetts, Portsmouth Dockyard
- Launched: November 1656
- Commissioned: 1656
- Renamed: HMS Richmond (in 1660)
- Fate: Sold in 1698 to take to pieces

General characteristics as built 1656
- Type: 20-gun fifth rate
- Tons burthen: 23280/94 bm
- Length: 89 ft 11 in (27.4 m) gundeck, 76 ft 0 in (23.2 m) keel for tonnage
- Beam: 24 ft 0 in (7.3 m) for tonnage
- Draught: 11 ft 6 in (3.5 m)
- Depth of hold: 9 ft 9 in (3.0 m)
- Sail plan: ship-rigged
- Complement: 100 in 1660 and 1666, 130 by 1673
- Armament: As built 1655; 16 x demi-culverins (UD); 4 x sakers (QD)

Wakefield was a fifth-rate warship of the Commonwealth of England's naval forces, one of six such ships ordered on 28 December 1654, all 6 built in the state dockyards (the others were Pembroke, Dartmouth, Norwich, Cheriton, and Oxford). She was built by Master Shipwright John Tippetts at Portsmouth Dockyard, and was launched in November 1656 as a 22-gun Fifth rate. She was named Wakefield to commemorate the Roundhead capture of that town by Thomas Fairfax in 1643.

Her length was recorded as 89 feet 11 inches (27.4 metres) on the gundeck and 76 feet 0 inches (23.2 metres) on the keel for tonnage calculation. The breadth was 24 feet 0 inches (7.3 metres) with a depth in hold of 9 ft 9 in (3.0 m). The tonnage was thus calculated at 23280/94 bm tons.

She was originally armed with 22 guns, probably comprising 16 demi-culverins on the single gundeck and 6 sakers on the quarterdeck. At the Restoration in 1660 she was taken into the Royal Navy and renamed as HMS Richmond. By 1665 she actually carried 24 guns, comprising the 16 demi-culverins on the gundeck, and now with 8 sakers on the quarterdeck. The Richmond served throughout the Second Anglo-Dutch War and the Third Anglo-Dutch War, but did not take part in any major battle. She was converted to a fireship in August 1677, and was finally sold on 30 August 1687 to be taken to pieces.
