= English ship Fagons =

Warship

History

England
- Name: Fagons
- Namesake: St Fagans, Cardiff
- Operator: Navy of the Commonwealth of England; Royal Navy (from 1660)
- Ordered: 1 October 1653
- Builder: Robert Page, Wivenhoe
- Launched: 22 May 1654
- Commissioned: 1654
- Renamed: Milford in 1660
- Fate: Burnt by accident 1671

General characteristics as built 1654
- Type: 22-gun fifth rate
- Tons burthen: 26176/94 bm
- Length: 82 ft 0 in (25.0 m) keel for tonnage
- Beam: 24 ft 6 in (7.5 m) for tonnage
- Draught: 12 ft (3.7 m)
- Depth of hold: 10 ft 0 in (3.0 m)
- Sail plan: ship-rigged
- Complement: 100 in 1660, 110 in 1666, 125 in 1667
- Armament: As built 1654; 18 x demi-culverins (UD); 4 x sakers (QD)

Fagons was a 22-gun fifth-rate warship of the Commonwealth of England's naval forces, one of six such ships built under the 1653 Programme (the others were Islip, Colchester, Selby, Basing, and Grantham). She was built by contract with shipwright Robert Page at his yard at Wivenhoe, Essex, and was launched on 22 May 1654. She was named Fagons after the village of St Fagans in Glamorgan, although the Commonwealth dropped the prefix "Saint" from her name.

Her length on the keel was recorded as 82 feet (25.0 metres) for tonnage calculation. The breadth was 24 feet 6 inches (7.5 metres) with a depth in hold of 10 ft 0 in (3.0 m). The tonnage was thus calculated at 26176/94 bm tons.

She was originally armed with 22 guns, comprising 18 demi-culverins on the single gundeck and 4 sakers on the quarterdeck. At the Restoration in 1660, she was taken into the Royal Navy and renamed HMS Milford. By 1665, she carried 30 guns, comprising 14 demi-culverins and 2 6-pounders on the gundeck, and 12 sakers on the quarterdeck, plus 2 3-pounders on the poop. In the Second Anglo-Dutch War, she took part in the Battle of Lowestoft in June 1665. She was at Port Mahon (Menorca under Captain John Shelley on 7 July 1671 when a fire broke out in her bread room, and she was burnt.
