= English ship Bradford =

Warship

History

England
- Name: Bradford
- Operator: Navy of the Commonwealth of England; Royal Navy (from 1660)
- Ordered: 29 January 1657
- Builder: John Taylor, Chatham Dockyard
- Launched: March 1658
- Commissioned: 1658
- Fate: Blown up by accident 1672

General characteristics as built 1657
- Type: 24-gun fifth rate
- Tons burthen: 294 bm
- Length: 85 ft 0 in (25.9 m) keel for tonnage
- Beam: 25 ft 6 in (7.8 m) for tonnage
- Draught: 12 ft (3.7 m)
- Depth of hold: 10 ft 8 in (3.3 m)
- Sail plan: ship-rigged
- Complement: 100 in 1660, 120 in 1666
- Armament: As built 1657; 18 x demi-culverins (UD); 6 x sakers (QD)

Bradford was a fifth-rate warship of the Commonwealth of England's naval forces, one of two such ships built under the 1656 Programme (the other was Forrester). The two ships were authorised to be built on 8 April 1656 to be built in the state dockyards at Portsmouth and Deptford, but on 10 July the Council of State directed that the two should be built in the Forest of Dean, "to make the experiment of building frigates in the Forest" (this is probably the reason for the ship's name). This was done with the first ship, but the second was later awarded to Portsmouth Dockyard on 25 September and subsequently changed to Chatham Dockyard on 29 January 1657, where she was built by Master Shipwright Captain John Taylor and was launched in March 1658. She was named Bradford to commemorate the support given by that town to the Parliamentary cause during the Civil War.

Her length on the keel was recorded as 85 feet (25.9 metres) for tonnage calculation. The breadth was 25 feet 6 inches (7.8 metres) with a depth in hold of 10 ft 8 in (3.3 m). The tonnage was thus calculated at 294 bm tons.

She was originally armed with 24 guns, comprising 18 demi-culverins on the single gundeck and 6 sakers on the quarterdeck. At the Restoration in 1660 she was taken into the Royal Navy and renamed Success. By 1665 she actually carried 30 guns, comprising 10 culverins and 10 demi-culverins on the gundeck, and 10 sakers on the quarterdeck. In the Second Anglo-Dutch War she took part in the Battle of Lowestoft in June 1665. In the Third Anglo-Dutch War she participated in the Battle of Solebay on 28 May 1672 and the Battle of Texel on 11 August 1673. On 2 December 1679 the Success was hunting pirates off the south coast of Cuba under Lieutenant Thomas Johnson, when she ran onto the flukes of her own anchor while attempting to moor, and sank.
