= Action of 12 March 1672 =

1672 naval battle

Coordinates: 50.549°N 1.111°W

- Part of the Franco-Dutch War
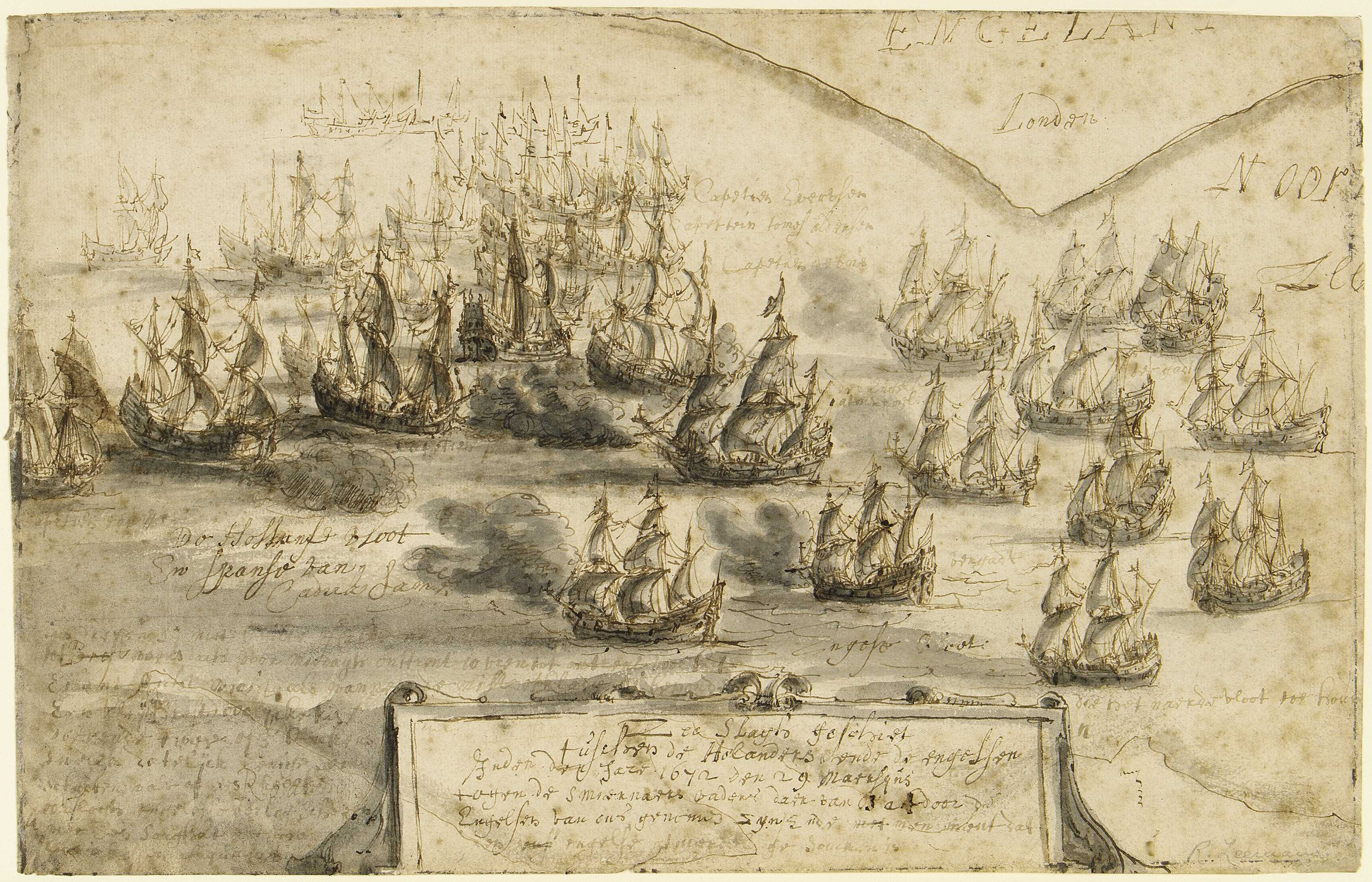
- Holme's attack on the Smyrna Fleet, off Beachy Head, 12 March 1672
Date	12–13 March 1672
Location	English Channel
Result	Indecisive

Belligerents
England	Dutch Republic

Commanders and leaders
Sir Robert Holmes; Sir Frescheville Holles	(Dutch Republic) Adriaan de Haaze † (Dutch Republic) Cornelis Evertsen

Strength
9 warships	5 warships 66 merchant ships

Casualties and losses
1 warship disabled (Saint Michael) and severe damage to the other ships	1 warship captured (Klein Hollandia); 4 merchant ships captured

The action of 12 March 1672 was a naval battle of the Third Anglo-Dutch War between a squadron commanded by Sir Robert Holmes and Sir Frescheville Holles against the Smyrna convoy, which was protected by 5 warships under De Haaze and Cornelis Evertsen. The Battle took place before the official start of the conflict, but now there was no turning back and England declared war on the Dutch Republic on March 17, 1672.

== Battle ==
Sir Robert Holmes with a squadron of 5 ships cruising about the Isle of Wight, met with the Dutch Smyrna fleet, consisting of about 50 sail.

When the English fleet closed in with the Smyrna convoy, Holmes ordered Captain De Haaze to come aboard his ship. De Haaze refused, and English ship Saint Michael reacted to this refusal with a broadside after which De Haaze's ship replied in kind, and the engagement became general. At a certain point during the battle Haaze was killed, but his crew kept resisting. Holmes maintained the engagement until sunset, but failed to capture a single ship while his squadron had suffered severe damage. With dawn the action resumed. Four English warships which had hung back the day before now joined the battle. After another whole day of fighting, Evertsen managed to extract 62 merchantmen from danger. The Dutch during the engagement had lost 1 warship and only lost 4 merchantmen of which only 2 were of any value. The English ships had suffered severe damage with one ship disabled.

The Gloucester's prize the Klein Hollandia which she had disabled and captured, later foundered off Eastbourne.

== Ships involved ==
The following details are from British Warships in the Age of Sail, 1603–1714.

Holmes' squadron
Vessel	Guns
Saint Michael	90
Resolution	70
Cambridge	70
Gloucester	62
York	60
Fairfax	60
Diamond	48
Success	32

De Haaze's squadron
Vessel	Guns
Vlissingen	50
Utrecht	48
Klein Hollandia	44
Dordrecht	44
Delft	36

== Sources ==
- Shomette, Donald G.; Haslach, Robert D. (1988). Raid on America: The Dutch Naval campaign of 1672-1674. University of South Carolina Press. ISBN 978-0788422454.
