= Nathaniel Nye =

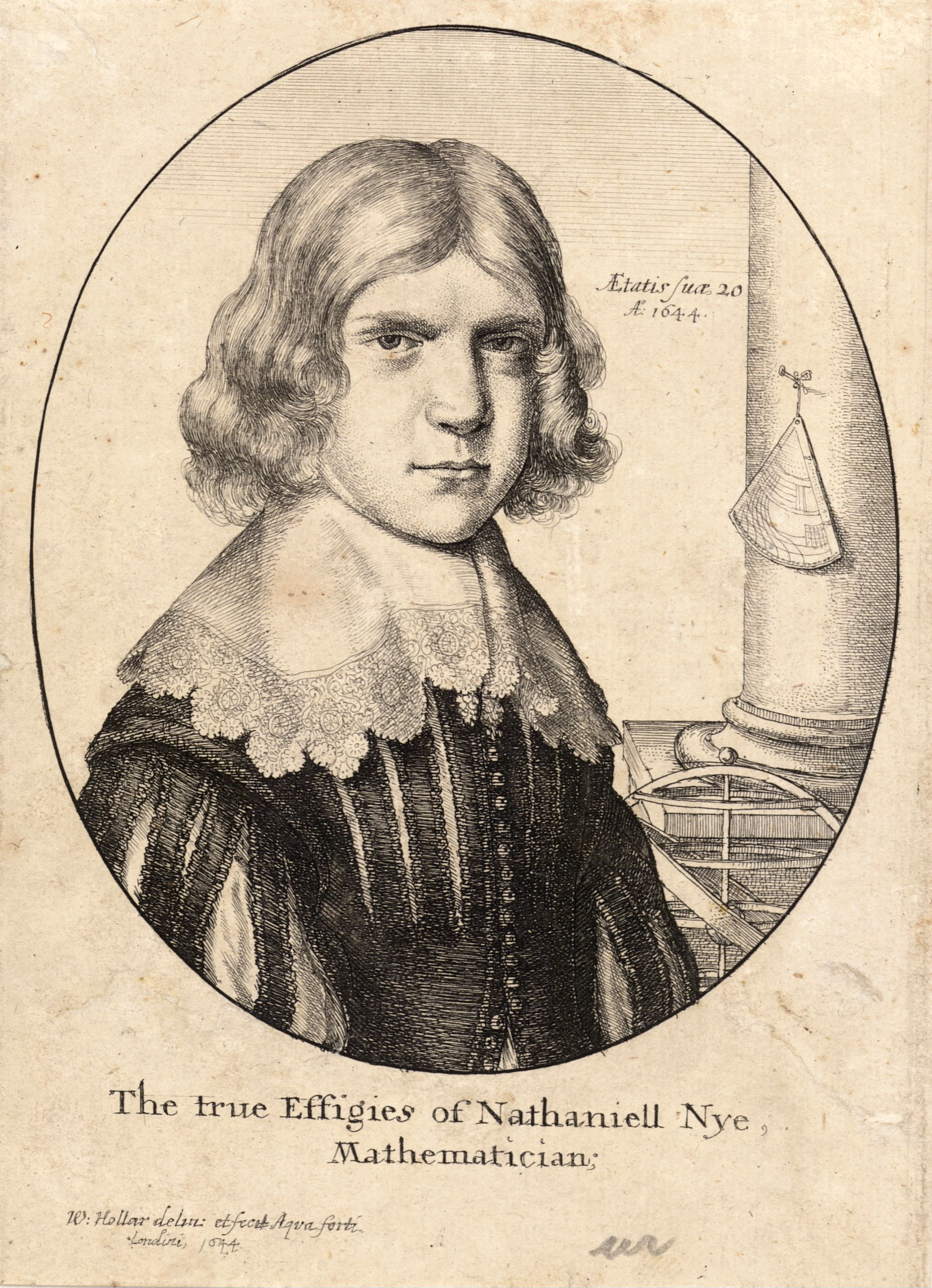
A 1644 engraving of Nathaniel Nye by Wenceslas Hollar

Nathaniel Nye (baptised 1624 – after 1647) was an English mathematician, astronomer, cartographer and gunner.

== Biography ==
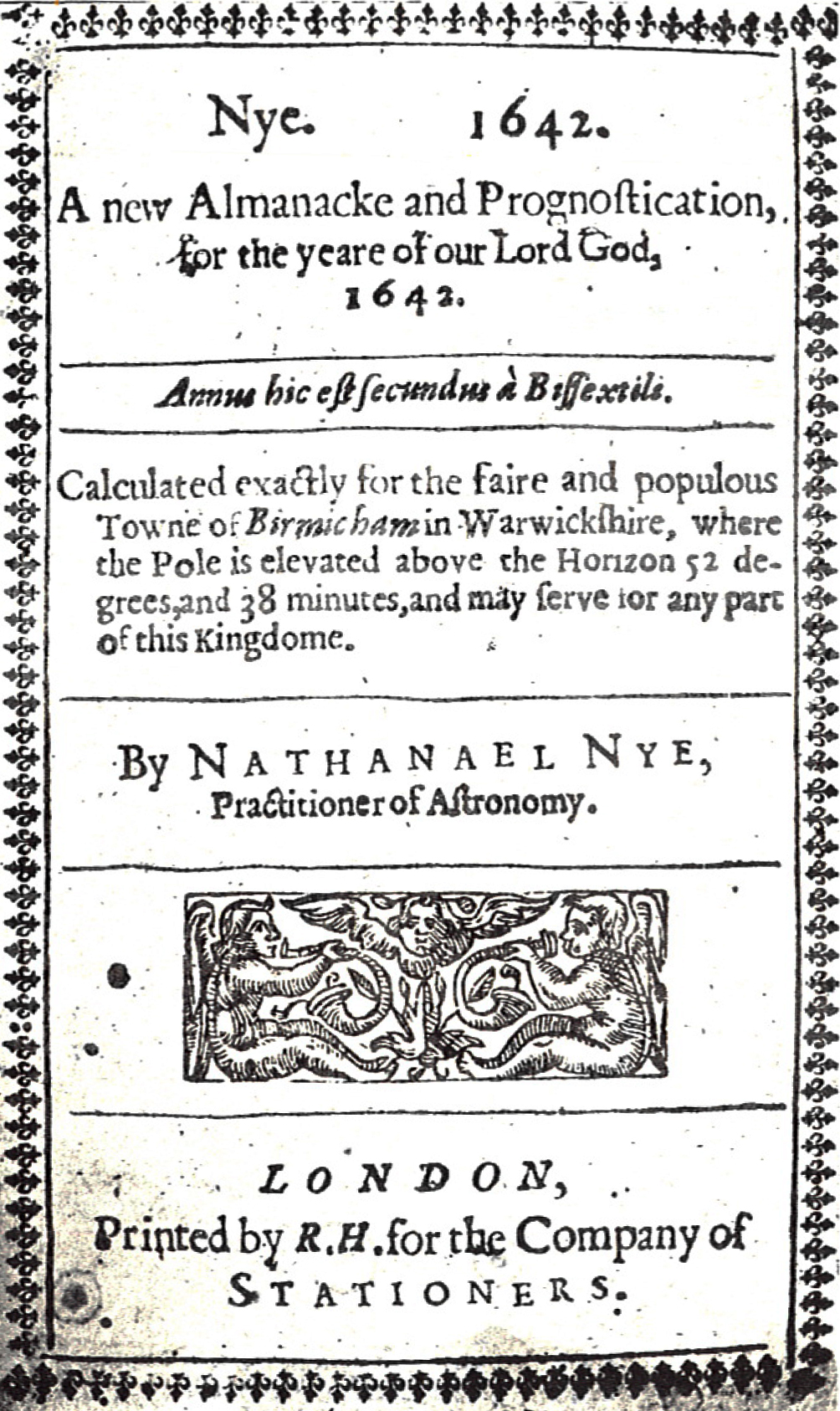
Frontispiece of Nye's New Almanacke and Prognostication for 1642

Nye was baptised in St Martin in the Bull Ring, Birmingham on 18 April 1624, and was probably the son of a governor of the town's King Edward's School.

In 1642 he published A New Almanacke and Prognostication calculated exactly for the faire and populous Towne of Birmicham in Warwickshire, where the Pole is elevated above the Horizon 52 degrees and 38 minutes, and may serve for any part of this Kingdome, in which he described himself as a "Practitioner of Astronomy". The dedication to this book suggests that he must have issued an earlier almanac in 1640, possibly from Arnhem in the Netherlands, when he would have been aged 17. A further almanac was published in 1643, in which he was described as "Mathematitian, Practitioner of Astronomy", and two more were forthcoming in 1645.

Nye also developed an interest in guns – Birmingham's principal trade during the English Civil War – and he is recorded as testing a Birmingham cannon in 1643 and experimenting with a saker in Deritend in 1645. From 1645 he was the master gunner to the Parliamentarian garrison at Evesham and in 1646 he successfully directed the artillery at the Siege of Worcester, detailing his experiences and in his 1647 book The Art of Gunnery. Believing that war was as much a science as an art, his explanations focused on triangulation, arithmetic, theoretical mathematics, and cartography as well as practical considerations such as the ideal specification for gunpowder or slow matches. His book acknowledged mathematicians such as Robert Recorde and Marcus Jordanus as well as earlier military writers on artillery such as Niccolò Tartaglia and Thomas Malthus.

Nothing is known of Nye's life after 1647, though further editions of The Art of Gunnery were produced in 1648 and 1670.

== Bibliography ==
- Donagan, Barbara (2008), War in England 1642-1649, Oxford: Oxford University Press, ISBN 978-0-19-928518-1
- Hill, Joseph (1907), The book makers of old Birmingham: authors, printers, and book sellers; republished, New York: B. Franklin, 1971, ISBN 0-8337-1706-5
- Porter, Stephen (2008), "Nye, Nathaniel (bap. 1624), mathematician and master gunner", Oxford Dictionary of National Biography (Online ed.), Oxford University Press
