= HMS St Michael =

Ship of the line of the Royal Navy

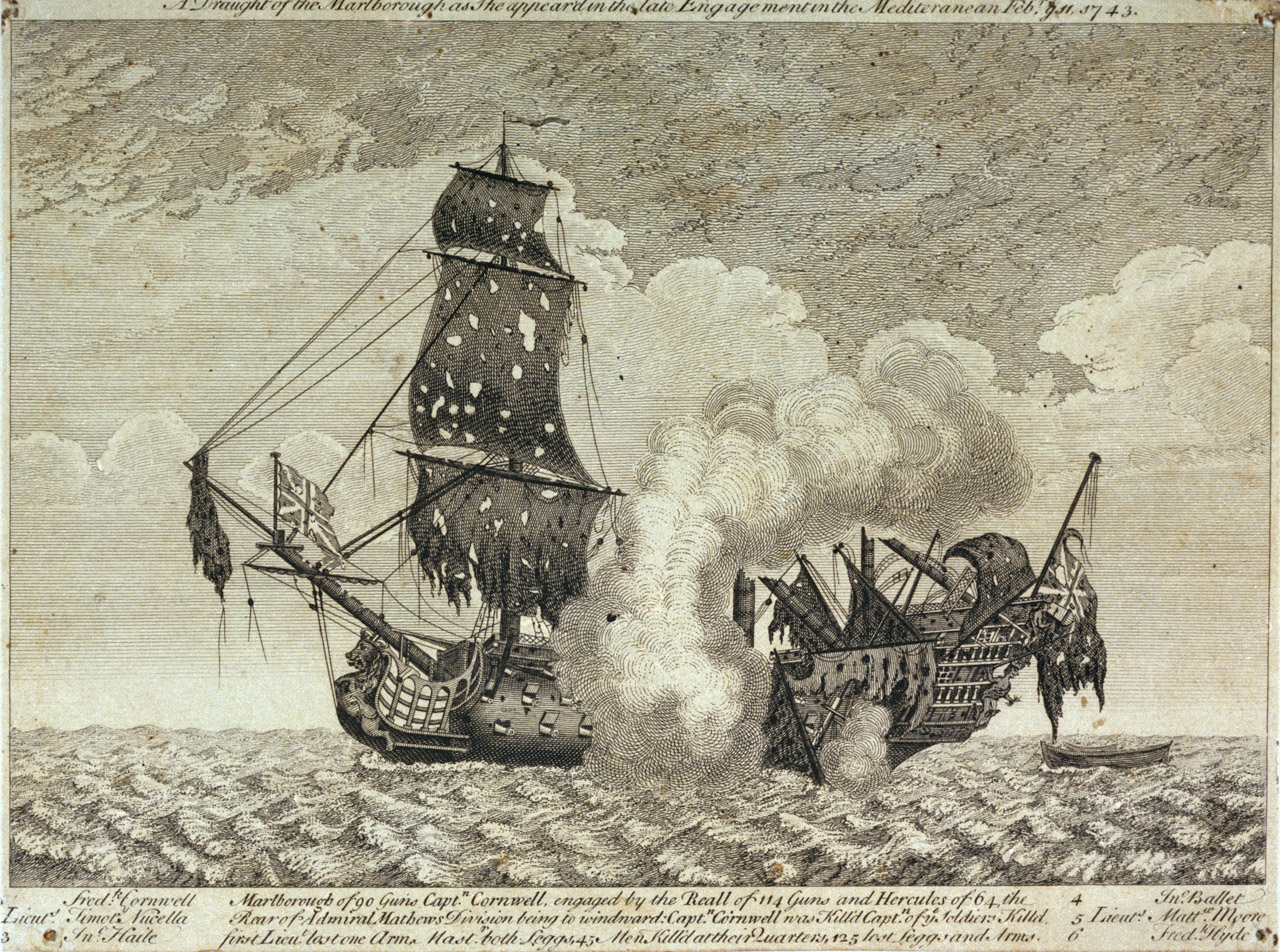
- Marlborough after the Battle of Toulon (1744)

History

Great Britain
- Name: HMS St Michael
- Builder: Tippetts, Portsmouth Dockyard
- Launched: 1669
- Renamed: HMS Marlborough, 1706
- Fate: Wrecked, 29 November 1762

General characteristics as built
- Class & type: 90-gun second rate ship of the line
- Tons burthen: 1101 bm
- Length: 125 ft (38 m) (keel)
- Beam: 40 ft 8 1/2 in (12.408 m)
- Depth of hold: 17 ft 5 in (5.31 m)
- Propulsion: Sails
- Sail plan: Full-rigged ship
- Armament: 90 guns of various weights of shot

General characteristics after 1706 rebuild
- Class & type: 90-gun second rate ship of the line
- Tons burthen: 1579 bm
- Length: 162 ft 8 in (49.58 m) (gundeck)
- Beam: 47 ft 4 in (14.43 m)
- Depth of hold: 18 ft 6 in (5.64 m)
- Propulsion: Sails
- Sail plan: Full-rigged ship
- Armament: 90 guns of various weights of shot

General characteristics after 1732 rebuild
- Class & type: 1719 Establishment 90-gun second rate ship of the line
- Tons burthen: 1567 bm
- Length: 164 ft (50 m) (gundeck)
- Beam: 47 ft 2 in (14.38 m)
- Depth of hold: 18 ft 10 in (5.74 m)
- Propulsion: Sails
- Sail plan: Full-rigged ship
- Armament: 90 guns: Gundeck: 26 × 32 pdrs; Middle gundeck: 26 × 18 pdrs; Upper gundeck: 26 × 9 pdrs; Quarterdeck: 10 × 6 pdrs; Forecastle: 2 × 6 pdrs

HMS St Michael was a 90-gun second rate ship of the line of the Royal Navy, built by John Tippetts of Portsmouth Dockyard and launched in 1669.

St Michael was commissioned in 1672 under the command of Sir Robert Holmes. Under his command, St Michael took part in the action of 12 March 1672, an indecisive engagement against the Dutch Republic; she lost 34 killed and 56 wounded. Soon after on 6 June 1672, St Michael was in action again at the Battle of Solebay.

St Michael was re-classed as a first rate ship in 1672, and became the flagship of Rear Admiral Thomas Butler. She took part in the two Battles of Schooneveld and the Battle of Texel in 1673, the last seeing her lose 60 killed and 130 wounded.

In 1678, St Michael was reduced to her original classification as a second rate ship.

St Michael was rebuilt at Blackwall Yard in 1706, at which time she was also renamed HMS Marlborough. This name was chosen to commemorate the Duke of Marlborough's victory at the Battle of Blenheim in 1704.

On 5 April 1725 Marlborough was ordered to be taken to pieces and rebuilt at Chatham. She was relaunched on 25 September 1732.

On 11 February 1744 during the Battle of Toulon. Marlborough and Namur bore the brunt of the Spanish fire, her captain James Cornewall, and 42 crew were killed and 120 wounded out of her crew of 750 men. Command passed to his distant cousin, Frederick Cornewall, the First Lieutenant, who was severely wounded and lost his right arm. Cornewall was buried at sea.

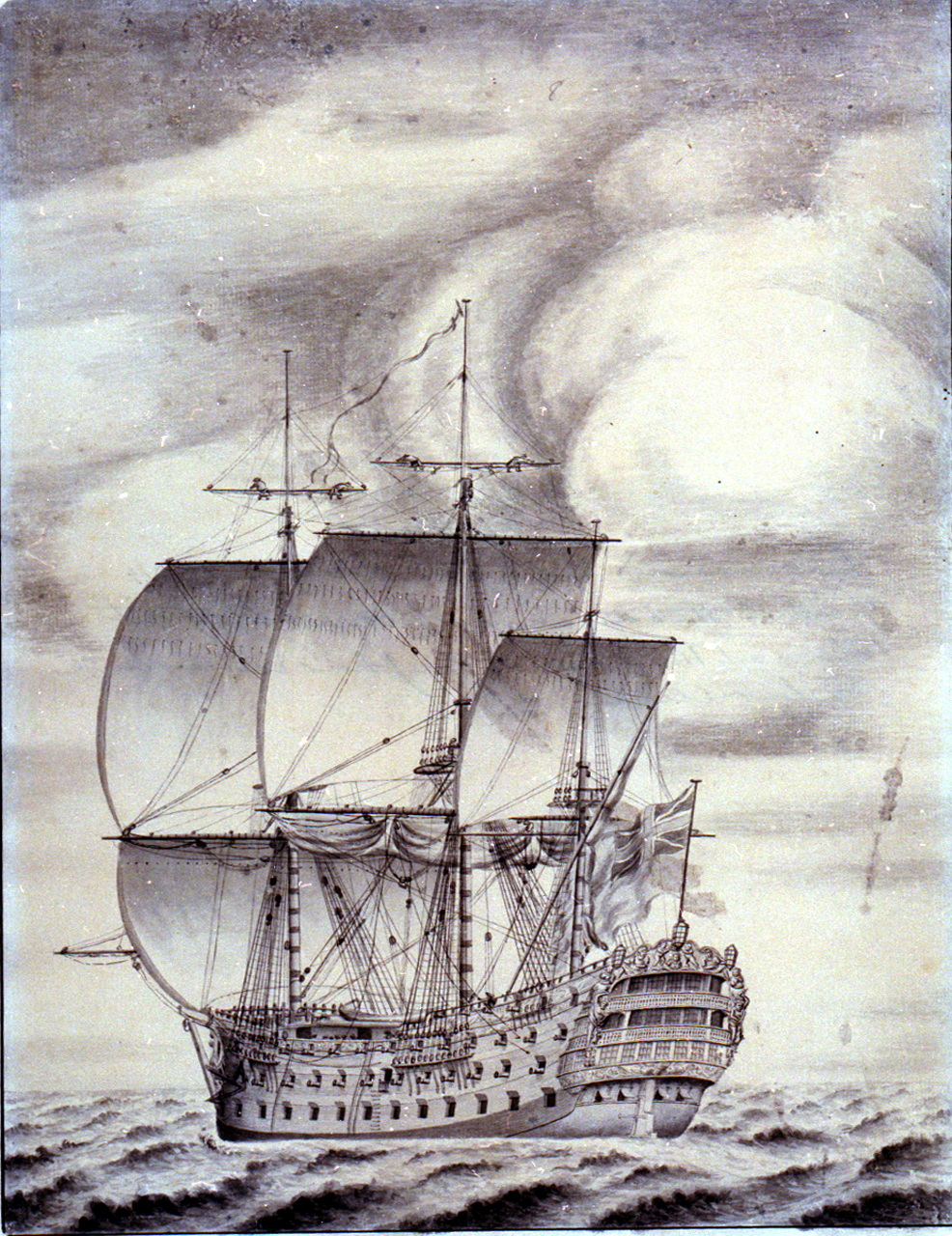
Marlbrough, 74 Guns commanded by Sir John Bentley 1744, sketched by his clerk, John Hood

Marlborough was reduced to a 68-gun ship in 1752.

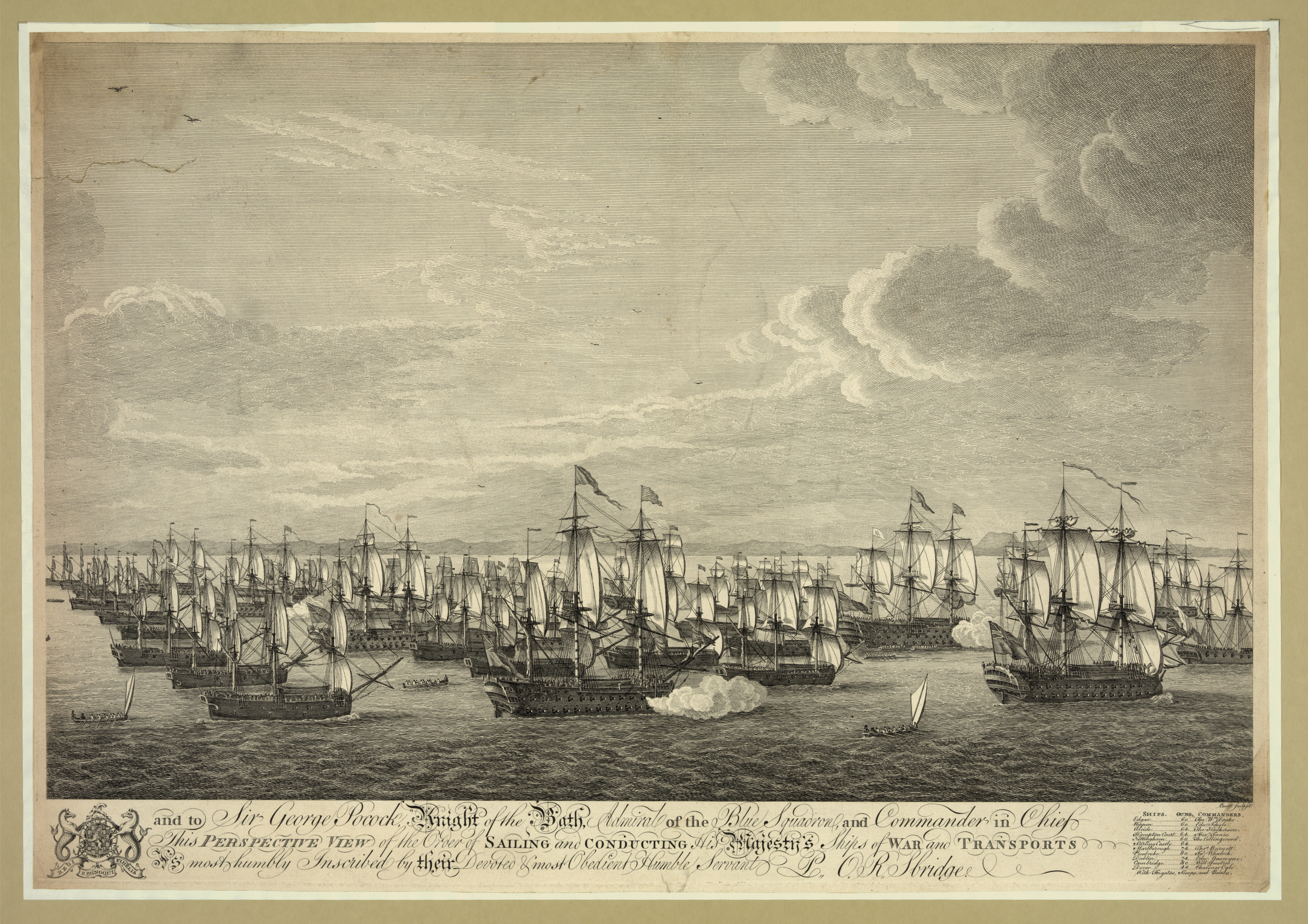
Marlborough shown here as a member Sir George Pocock's Blue Squadron, circa 1762

She formed part of Sir George Pocock's fleet at the taking of Havana from the Spanish in 1762. Whilst making her way back to Britain she was caught in very heavy weather, and on 29 November 1762 her crew were forced to abandon ship, all of her crew being taken off by a passing HMS Antelope before she sank. Her Captain Thomas Burnett was court martialled as a result, and although exonerated would not regain a command until 1770.
