= English ship Sussex (1652) =

Fourth-rate frigate

History

England
- Name: Sussex
- Ordered: 27 February 1652
- Launched: November 1652
- Fate: Accidentally blown up, 9 December 1653

General characteristics
- Class & type: Fourth-rate frigate
- Tons burthen: c.600
- Length: 110 ft (34 m) (keel, estimated)
- Beam: 32 ft (9.8 m) (estimated)
- Sail plan: Full-rigged ship
- Complement: 180 (1653)
- Armament: 46 guns (1653)

The Sussex was a fourth-rate frigate, built for the navy of the Commonwealth of England at one of the national Dockyards, and launched in late 1652. Her place of building is uncertain, with certain sources recording this as Portsmouth (by John Tippetts), others as Deptford and still others as Woolwich (by Christopher Pett). A standard practice at this time was to build the hull in one location and masts and superstructure could be at a separate dock, and the fitting of equipment (cannon etc) at a third location.

She was commissioned under Captain Roger Cuttance, and fitted out on the Thames. By 1653, her armament is recorded as consisting of 46 guns.

The Sussex took part in the Battle of Portland in February 1653, and in the Battle of the Gabbard in June 1653, but was accidentally blown up at Portsmouth on 9 December 1653.
