= John Tippetts =

British shipbuilder and harbour designer

John Tippetts (1622–1692) was an English shipbuilder and harbour designer who rose to be Surveyor of the Navy, the highest position in British naval architecture.

== Life ==
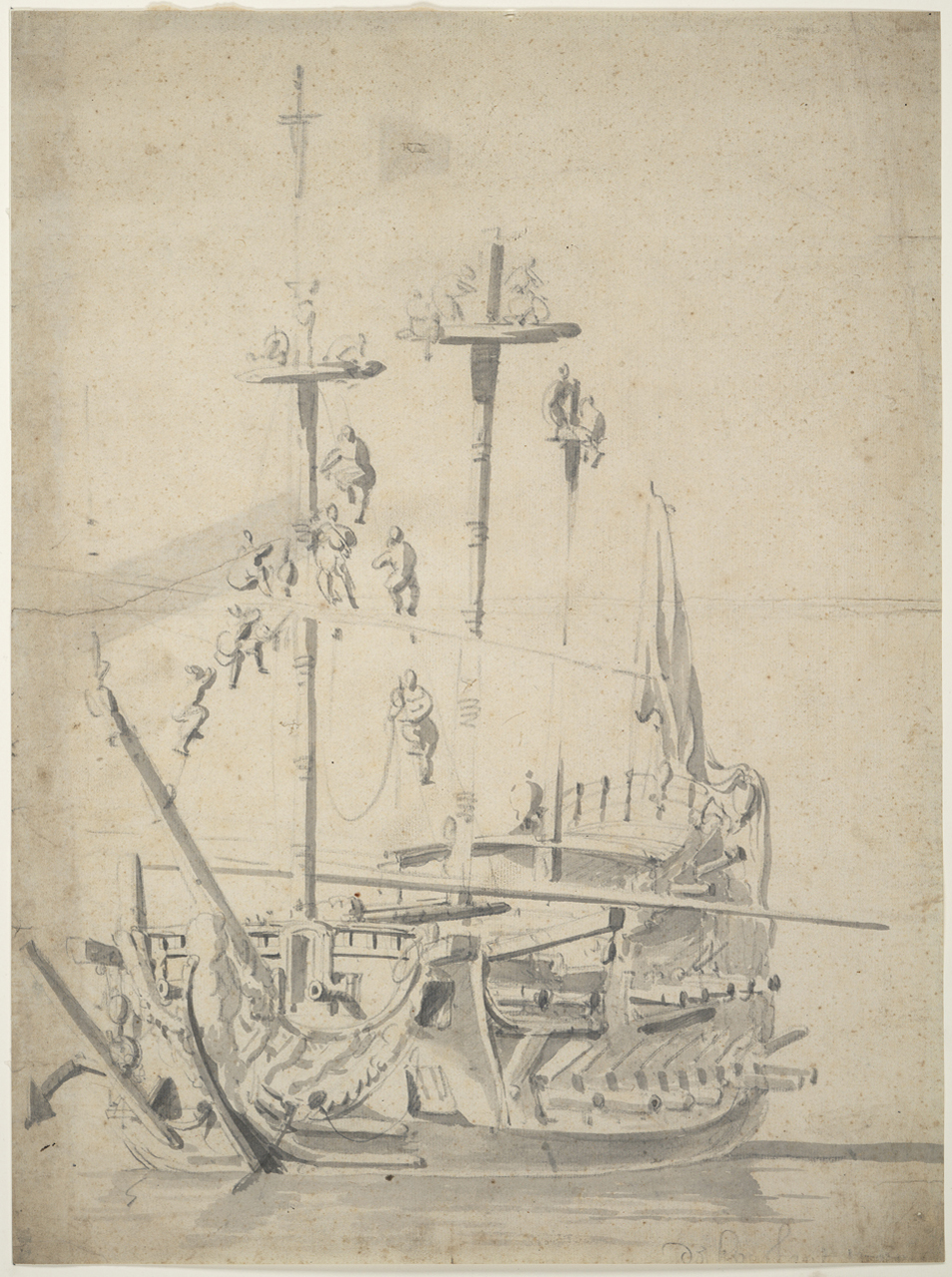
Constant Warwick

He was born in Dursley in Gloucestershire in 1622 the son of Richard Tippetts (1600–1663). He was probably apprenticed as a ships carpenter in Bristol.

He is first recorded as an employee of the Navy of the Commonwealth of England in April 1650 as a Master Shipwright at Portsmouth Dockyard.

In 1668 he was appointed Resident Commissioner at Portsmouth Dockyard, a role overseeing dock improvements and repairs, and an intermediary between the Navy Board (Surveyor of the Navy) and the shipwrights. On 5 September 1672 he was appointed Surveyor of the Navy, responsible for all construction of ships for the Royal Navy as well as the Royal Dockyards, as noted in the diary of Samuel Pepys. He was knighted on 12 October 1688, remaining in post following the Glorious Revolution.

He died in 1692 with his will being probated on 28 July 1692. His position at the Admiralty was filled by Edmund Dummer who had been an apprentice shipwright under him at Portsmouth.

== Family ==
Around 1656 he was married to Margaret Stephens, sister of Anthony Stephens, Cashier to the Navy Treasurer. They had five daughters and one son.

== Ships Designed ==
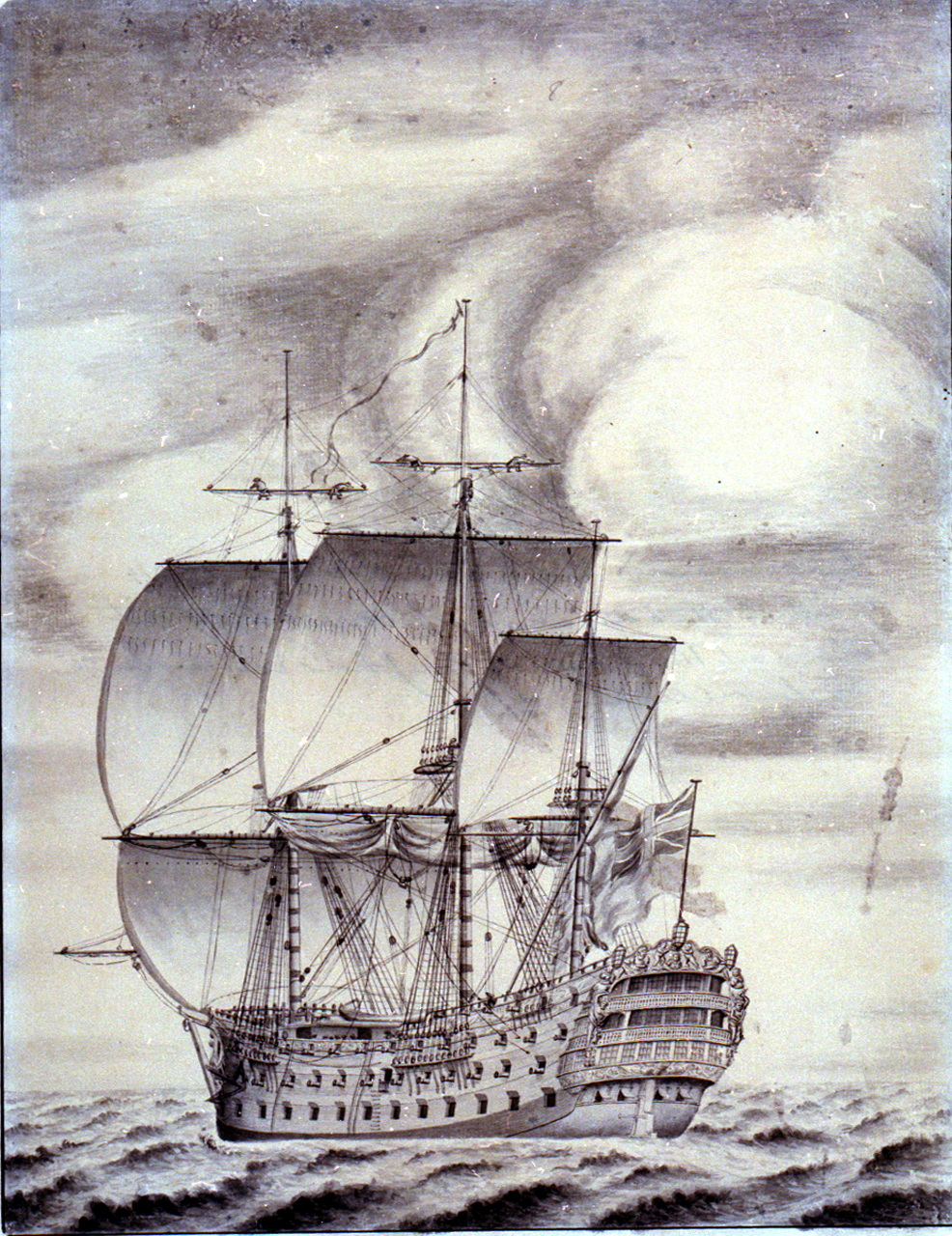
HMS St Michael

- Martin (1652) 14-gun ship
- Sussex (1652) 40-gun ship of the line
- Bristol (1653) 48-gun ship of the line
- "Marigold" (1653) a Hoy
- Lyme (1654) a 52-gun ship of the line
- Dartmouth (1655) 22-gun ship
- Chestnut (1656) 8-gun ketch
- Wakefield (1656) 20-gun ship
- Monck (1659) 52-gun ship of the line
- HMS Royal Oak (1664) 76-gun ship of the line
- HMS Portsmouth (1665) 10-gun ketch
- HMS Constant Warwick (1666) rebuilt 34-gun frigate (also designed by Tippetts)
- HMS Portsmouth (1667) 4-gun ketch
- HMS St Michael (1669) 90-gun ship of the line (also designed by Tippetts) later renamed "Marlborough"
- Design of HMS Chichester - completed by Edmund Dummer and launched in 1695
