= Deritend ware =

Style of medieval pottery

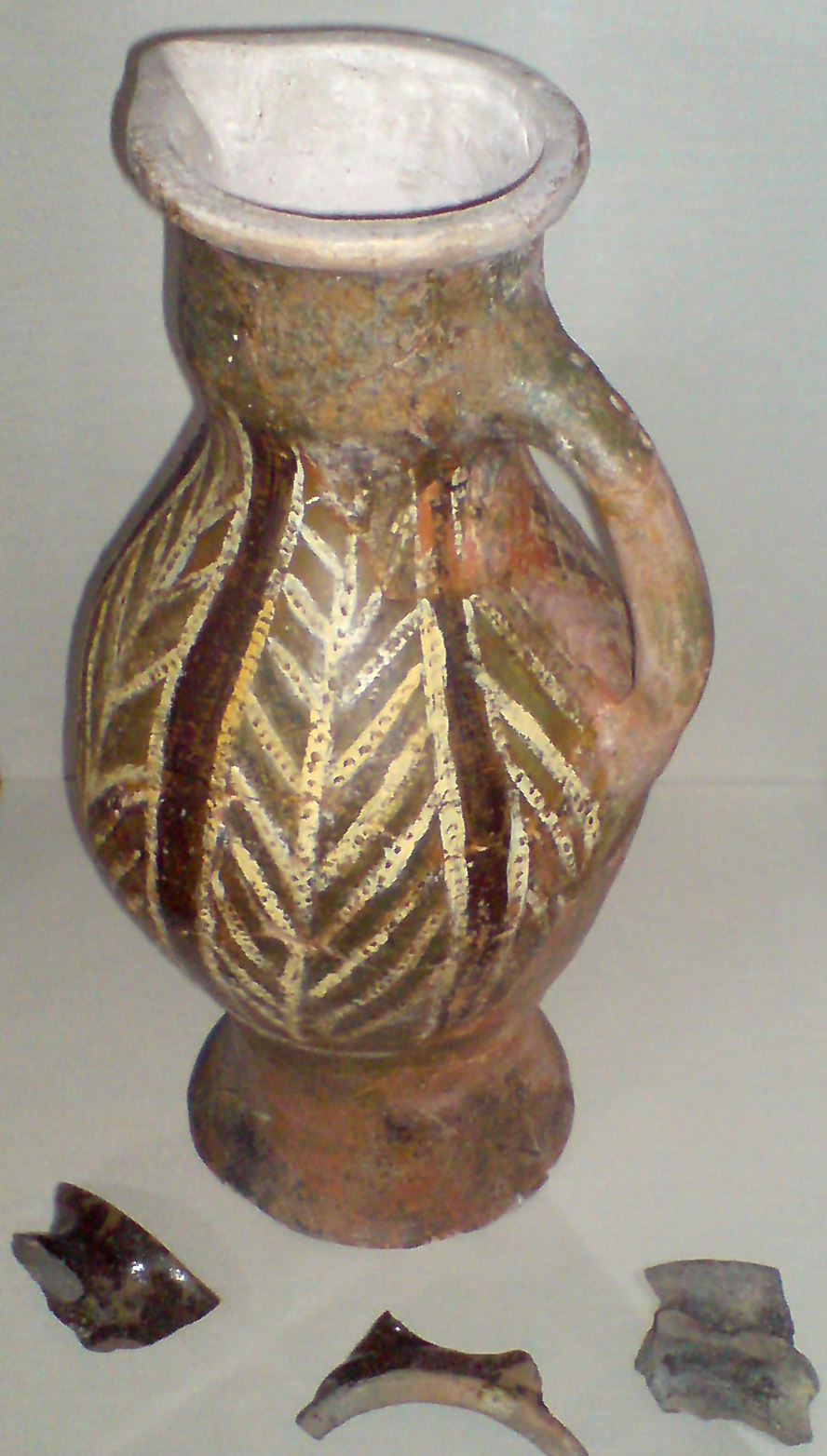
Deritend ware jug and sherds

Deritend ware is a distinctive style of medieval pottery produced in Birmingham, England in the twelfth and thirteenth centuries. There are three types of Deritend ware; a fine to moderately sandy, micaceous orange to red ware (Glazed Deritend ware), used mainly for jugs, with some examples of bowls, dripping trays and aquamaniles, dating to the 13th to early 14th centuries; a black or, less frequently, grey ware with a brown core (Reduced Deritend ware), also micaceous, used mainly for cooking pots/jars and less commonly for large unglazed jugs and skillets/pipkins, dating from possibly the late 12th century to the early 14th century; and a sandy brown ware with grey core (Deritend cooking pot ware) used for cooking pots, dating from possibly the late 12th century to 13th century. Wasters i.e. pottery misfires have been found for all three wares in Birmingham. Glazed Deritend ware jugs were decorated with white slip (liquid clay) lines and applied white clay strips, often roller stamped, and white clay pads, The more complex (and later) decorative schemes are in the North French style (c. AD 1275–1325); the decorated jugs closely resemble London-type ware and it is distinctly possible that the Deritend ware industry included migrant potters from the London area in the thirteenth century.

Deritend Ware was produced in the Digbeth, Deritend and Bull Ring areas of Birmingham in kilns that were probably located in the back yards of houses. The orange clay is the Mercia Mudstone that underlies this area of Birmingham and would have been obtained locally, while the white clay would have been brought from further afield.

Evidence for the manufacture of Deritend ware in Birmingham was first discovered during the widening of High Street, Deritend in 1953, when misfired fragments of pottery were found to the south of the main road. Further evidence has since been found at the Old Crown Inn, the Custard Factory and underneath the site of Selfridges in the Bull Ring.

All three types of Deritend ware are found widely distributed in the West Midlands in Worcestershire, Herefordshire, Staffordshire and Warwickshire.

== Bibliography ==
- Buteux, Simon (2003), Beneath the Bull Ring: The Archaeology of Life and Death in Early Birmingham, Brewin Books, ISBN 1-85858-242-3
- Hodder, Michael A. (2004), Birmingham: the hidden history, Tempus, ISBN 0-7524-3135-8
- Rátkai, Stephanie (2009), The Bull Ring Uncovered: Excavations at Edgbaston Street, Moor Street, Park Street and The Row, Birmingham 1997-2001, Oxbow, ISBN 978-1-84217-285-8
- Vince, Alan (2008), Characterisation Studies of a Greyware vessel from the Old Crown, Birmingham (PDF), Alan Vince Archaeological Consultancy
