= Kemune =

Archaeological site in Iraq

- Location within Iraq
- 36°46′7″N 42°43′55″E
- Type: settlement
- Periods: Bronze Age
- Cultures: Mitanni period
- Location: Nineveh Governorate, Iraq

History
- Built: circa 1600 BC
- Abandoned: Middle 2nd millennium BC

Site notes
- Excavation dates: 2018, 2022
- Archaeologists: Hasan Ahmed Qasim, Ivana Puljiz, Peter Pfälzner
- Condition: Ruined
- Owner: Public
- Public access: No

Kemune (thought to be the ancient city of Zakhiku) is an archaeological site discovered during a low water level in the reservoir of the Mosul Dam in the Nineveh Governorate, part of the Kurdistan region of Iraq in 2013. The Mitanni era city was destroyed by an earthquake around 1350 BC.

== History ==
=== Late Bronze Age ===
==== Mitanni Period ====
- the city peaked in importance and size, an important stop for caravans and trade.
- a palace
- 10 cuneiform clay tablets. These tablets were the key to identifying the ruins. One of the texts explicitly identifies the site as Zakhiku. Written in Akkadian but with Hurrian names reflecting the elite and local population.
- earthquake destroyed the city (c. 1350 BCE), wall collapse preserved some archaelogical finds

==== Middle Assyrian Period ====
- Assyrians take over the region (c. 1300 BCE).
- some occupation and activity in the ruins
- 100 cuneiform clay tablets

== Archaeology ==
The site was first excavated by German and Kurdish archaeologists in Autumn 2018. The excavation was led by Ivana Puljiz of the University of Tübingen. The work concentrated on the remains of the palace. Ten Mitanni-era tablets were discovered.

In 2021 extremely low water levels in the reservoir, due to a severe drought, again exposed the site and, in January and February 2022 the Kurdistan Archaeology Organization and University of Tübingen conducted additional emergency rescue excavations.

In addition to mapping the majority of the site, about 100 cuneiform tablets were recovered. The tablets date from the early Middle Assyrian period, just after the destruction of the city by an earthquake. The site has now again flooded. The site held a palace constructed on the banks of the Tigris River during the days of the Mitanni Empire rule over Assyria. The remains of the palace conserved to a height of about seven meters. According to Dr. Ivana Puljiz, the two usage phases are clearly noticeable, indicating that the building has been in use for a very long time. Archaeologists unearthed several rooms inside the palace and partially reviewed eight of them. They also uncovered big, fired bricks that were used as floor slabs in some places. Ten cuneiform clay tablets belonged to Mittani people and were translated by Betina Faist of Heidelberg University. According to one of the tablets, Kemune was probably the ancient city of Zakhiku. Well-preserved wall paintings were also found in some rooms, which are two meters thick and more than two meters high.

== See also ==
- Cities of the ancient Near East
