= Eastbourne wreck site =

Coordinates: 50°39′02″N 0°23′48″E

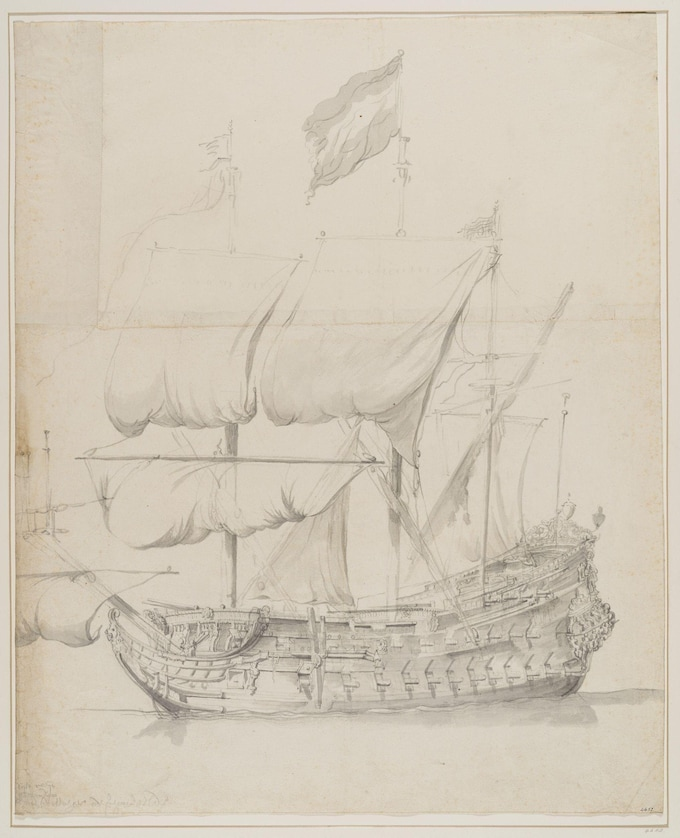
- A Two-Decker, probably the Dutch Ship Klein Hollandia, by Willem van de Velde the Elder

History

Dutch Republic
- Name: Klein Hollandia
- Launched: 1656
- Fate: Foundered in 1686

General characteristics
- Class & type: ship of the line
- Propulsion: Sails
- Sail plan: Full-rigged ship
- Armament: 44 guns

The wreck of the Klein Hollandia was found in 2019, 14 km southeast of Beachy Head, East Sussex, England. The site was designated under the Protection of Wrecks Act on 5 July 2019. The wreck is a Protected Wreck managed by Historic England.

== The wreck ==
The site, 32 metres (105 ft) below the surface, consists of a wooden wreck with cannon, galley bricks, concreted objects, and large dressed stone blocks.

== Discovery and investigation ==
The site was located in 2019 after divers investigated an obstruction identified by the UK Hydrographic Office. The Nautical Archaeology Society returned shortly after discovery to further investigate. At least thirteen cannon were observed, as well as galley bricks, concreted objects, and the probable base of a copper cauldron.

When designated in 2019 the wreck was believed to be a Dutch vessel, but its identity was not known until 2022. At least 31 cannon were identified, one dated 1670. In January 2023 the wreck was revealed as being the Klein Hollandia, a warship of the Admiralty of Rotterdam that was built in 1656. She had sunk in 1672 shortly after being attacked and boarded on 12 March 1672 by an English squadron while sailing from the Mediterranean to the Netherlands. This incident took place 2 weeks before the Third Anglo-Dutch War began, and so might have been a catalyst for the ensuing war.
