= Dutch ship Klein Hollandia (1656) =

Dutch ship of the 17th-century

History

Dutch Republic
- Name: Klein Hollandia
- Commissioned: 1656
- Fate: Sank in 1672

General characteristics
- Length: 40.5 m (132 ft 10 in)
- Beam: 10.2 m (33 ft 6 in)
- Draught: 4 m (13 ft 1 in)
- Complement: 44–54 guns

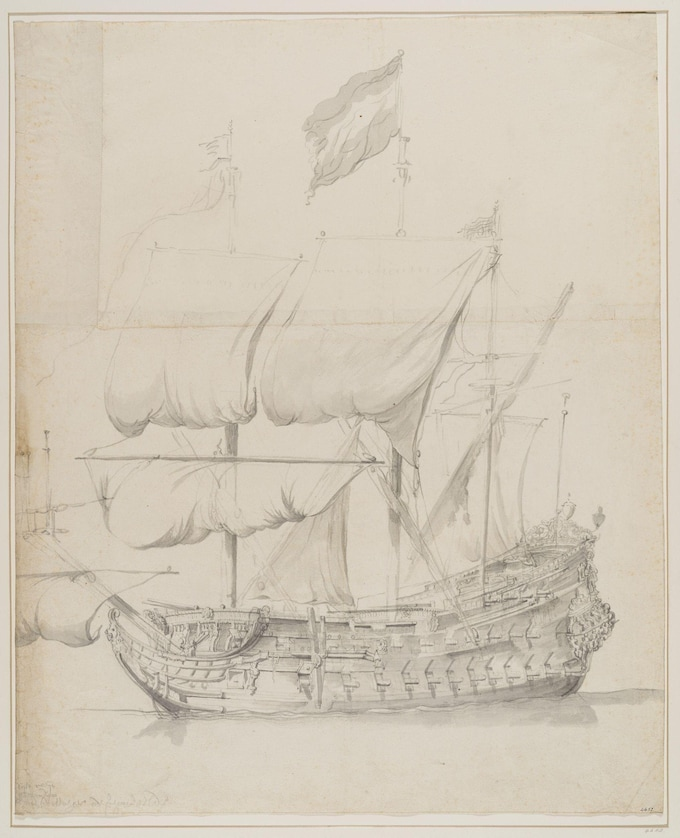
17th century drawing of the Klein Hollandia by Willem van de Velde

Klein Hollandia (1656 - 24 March 1672) was a Dutch warship owned by the Admiralty of Rotterdam, the military body helping govern the Dutch navy. The ship was involved in multiple key naval battles: the Battle of the Sound off Copenhagen in the Second Northern War on 29 October 1658 and all major naval battles of the Second Anglo-Dutch War. The ship was involved in the Action of 12 March 1672 against the English fleet. On the second day, on 24 March 1672 the ship was wrecked and sank. Captain Jan Van Nes and fifty other people died.

In 2019 the shipwreck was found off the coast of England at the Eastbourne wreck site, and identified as Klein Hollandia in January 2023.
