= Demi-culverin =

Type of cannon

The demi-culverin was a medium cannon similar to but slightly larger than a saker and smaller than a regular culverin developed in the late 16th century. Barrels of demi-culverins were typically about 11 feet (3.4 m) long, had a calibre of 4 inches (10 cm) and could weigh up to 3,400 pounds (1,500 kg). The gun required 6 pounds (2.7 kg) of black powder to fire an 8-pound (3.6 kg) round shot (though there were heavier variants firing 9-pound (4.1 kg) or 10-pound (4.5 kg) round shot). The demi-culverin had an effective range of 1,800 feet (550 m).

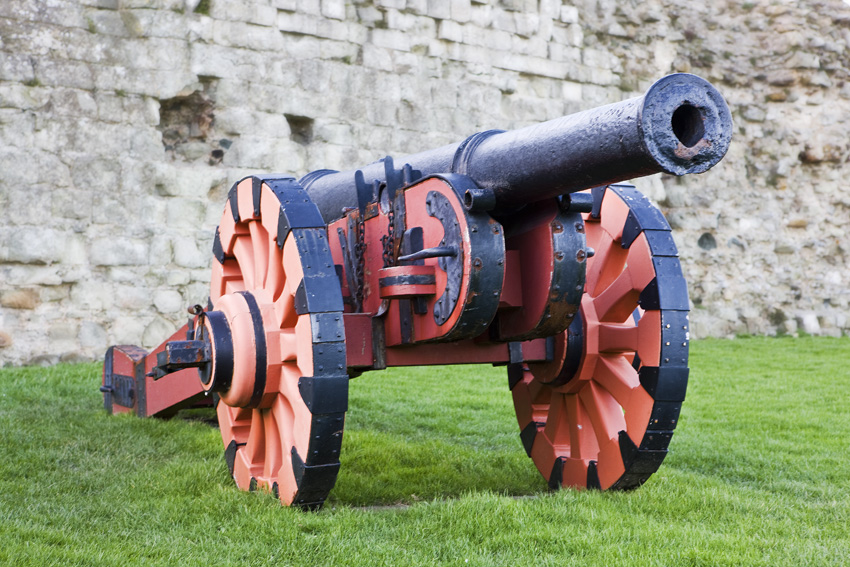
Demi-culverin cast circa 1587

Demi-culverins were valued by generals for their range, accuracy and effectiveness. They were often used in sieges for wall and building demolition.
