= Saker (cannon) =

Type of muzzle-loading cannon

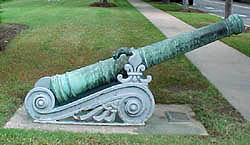
A Spanish saker of 1686.

The saker was a medium cannon, slightly smaller than a culverin, developed during the early 16th century and often used by the English. It was named after the saker falcon, a large falconry bird native to the Middle East.

A saker's barrel was approximately 9.5 ft (2.9 m) long, had a calibre of 3.25 inches (8.3 cm), and weighed approximately 1,900 pounds (860 kg). It could fire round shot weighing 5.25 pounds (2.38 kg) approximately 2,400 yards (2.2 km) using 4 pounds (1.8 kg) of black powder. The shot was intended to bounce along the ground to cause as much damage as possible, the explosive shell being rare before the 19th century. Tests performed in France during the 1950s show that a saker's range was over 3,000 yards (2.7 km) when fired at a 45-degree angle.

Henry VIII amassed a large arsenal of sakers in the early 16th century as he expanded the Royal Navy and came into conflict with France. Henry's foundries used so much bronze that there was a world shortage of tin. According to the inventory in the Anthony Roll, the Mary Rose carried several sakers, though none have been found so far and may have been recovered by salvagers soon after the ship's disastrous sinking. Sakers were heavily used during the English Civil War, especially during sieges, when they were used by both attackers and defenders of fortified towns. They also saw action in the Jacobite rising of 1689 and were used by the armies of both William III and James II at the Battle of the Boyne.

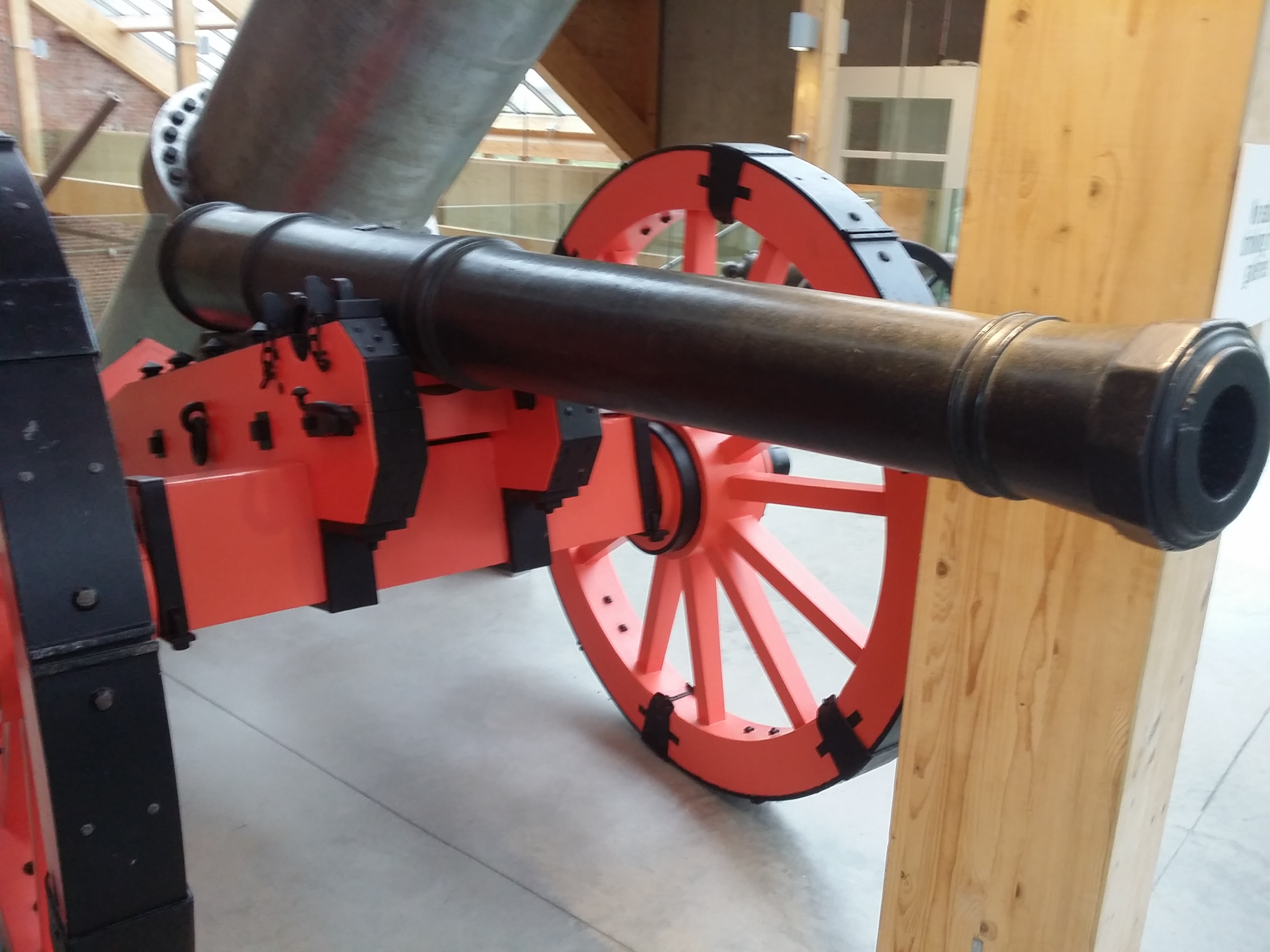
An English saker of 1601 on a 19th-century carriage.

A French version of the saker is the couleuvrine moyenne, meaning "middle sized", which was often used at sea. Venetian merchant ships often carried sakers to defend themselves from pirates, and similar cannons have been found on Spanish Armada wrecks.

In the New World, the Pilgrims removed the naval guns from the Mayflower for use in possible land engagements, which they installed in the fort that they built to protect their newly founded Plimoth Plantation from French, Spanish, and hostile Native Americans. The British installed six saker cannons in Castle William on Castle Island in 1644 when the first of many rebuilds and rearming over the centuries was conducted in order to control the approaches to Boston Harbor.

In Britain, Brigadier General Michael Richards was appointed Surveyor-General of the Ordnance in 1714 and he commissioned a Danish expert, Albert Borgard, to design a new artillery system. Borgard did away with the traditional nomenclature of culverins, sakers and minions, and devised a new system based on the weight of shot that each gun used, from 4 to 64 pounds. Although Borgard's gun designs were quickly superseded, the practice of naming ordnance by weight of shot persisted in Britain into the 20th century. The English saker became the 6-pounder smoothbore cannon. Other changes were as follows. The English minion became the 3-pounder, the English demi-culverin became the 8-pounder, the Spanish quart-canon became the 12-pounder, the English culverin became the 16-pounder, and the Spanish demi-canon became the 24-pounder.
