= List of ships of the line of the Royal Navy =

This is a list of ships of the line of the Royal Navy of England, and later (from 1707) of Great Britain, and the United Kingdom. The list starts from 1660, the year in which the Royal Navy came into being after the restoration of the monarchy under Charles II, up until the emergence of the battleship around 1880, as defined by the Admiralty.

== The early Restoration period (1660–77) ==
This list includes several earlier ships which were rebuilt for the Royal Navy in this period—specifically the first-rate Prince Royal (in 1663), the second-rate Victory (in 1666), the third-rate Montague (in 1675) and the fourth-rates Bonaventure (in 1663) and Constant Warwick (in 1666). The process, which generally involved the dismantling in dry dock of the old ship and constructing it to a new design incorporating part of the materials from the old vessel, produced what were in effect substantially new ships with altered dimensions and sizes, and generally mounting a somewhat larger number of guns.

=== First rates ===
- Prince Royal 92 (rebuilt 1663) – taken and burnt by the Dutch 1666

==== 96-gun group ====
- Charles 96 (1668) – renamed St George 1687, re-classed as second rate 1691, rebuilt 1701
- St Andrew 96 (1670) – renamed Royal Anne when rebuilt 1704
- London 96 (1670) – rebuilt 1706

==== 100-gun group ====
- Prince 100 (1670) – repaired and renamed Royal William 1692, rebuilt 1719
- Royal James 100 (1671) – burned in action 1672
- Royal Charles 100 (1673) – repaired and renamed Queen 1693, rebuilt and renamed Royal George in 1715
- Royal James 100 (1675) – renamed Victory 1691, then Royal George 1714, then Victory again in 1715; burnt by accident 1721

=== Second rates ===
- Royal Katherine 76 (1664) – rebuilt from 1699 to 1703
- Royal Oak 76 (1664) – burned by the Dutch on 14 June 1667
- Loyal London 80 (1666) – burned by the Dutch on 14 June 1667
- Victory 76 (Rebuilt 1666) – condemned and broken up 1691
- French Ruby 66 (1666) – a prize, Le Rubis, captured from the French, hulked January 1686 at Portsmouth after storm damage and broken up
- St Michael 90 (1669) – re-classed as a first rate 1672, then back to a second rate 1689; renamed Marlborough in 1706 and rebuilt 1706 to 1708

=== Third rates ===
- Clove Tree 62 (1665) – a prize, formerly VOC ship Nagelboom, captured from the Dutch, retaken by them 1666
- House of Sweeds 70 (1665) – formerly Huis te Zwieten, a prize captured from the Dutch, sunk as a blockship in the Thames 1667
- Golden Phoenix 70 (1665) – formerly Geldersche Ruyter, a prize captured from the Dutch, sunk as a blockship in the Thames 1667
- Slothany 60 (1665) – formerly Slot Hooningen, a prize captured from the Dutch, hulked 1667, sold 1686
- Helverson 60 (1665) – formerly Hilversum, a prize captured from the Dutch in June 1665, sunk as a blockship in the Medway 1667
- Cambridge 64 (1666) – wrecked 1694
- Warspite 64 (1666) – rebuilt 1702
- Defiance 64 (1666) – burned by accident 1668
- Rupert 64 (1666) – rebuilt 1703
- Resolution 64 (1667) – rebuilt 1698
- Monmouth 64 (1667) – rebuilt 1700
- Edgar 72 (1668) – rebuilt 1700
- Swiftsure 66 (1673) – rebuilt 1696
- Harwich 66 (1674) – wrecked 1691
- Royal Oak 70 (1674) – rebuilt 1713
- Defiance 64 (1675) – rebuilt 1695
- Arms of Rotterdam 60 (1674) – a prize captured from the Dutch, hulked 1675, broken up 1703
- Montague 62 – built as Lyme in 1654, rebuilt as Montague in 1675 and again rebuilt in 1698

=== Fourth rates ===
- 1637 Group
  - Expedition 30 (1637)
  - Providence 30 (1637)
- Constant Warwick 32 (1645) – rebuilt as a 42-gun in 1666, captured by the French 1691
- 1646 Programme Group
  - Adventure (1646)
  - Assurance (1646)
  - Nonsuch (1646)
- 1647 Programme Group
  - Dragon (1647)
  - Elizabeth (1647)
  - Phoenix (1647)
  - Tiger (1647)
- 1649 Programme Group
  - Portsmouth (1650)
  - President (1650)
- 1650 Programme Group
  - Foresight (1650)
  - Assistance (1650)
  - Reserve (1650)
  - Advice (1650)
  - Centurion (1650)
- 1651 Programme Group
  - Sapphire (1660)
  - Bristol (1660)
- Ruby Group
  - Ruby (1660)
  - Diamond (1660)
- Bonaventure 48 – previously named HMS President. Renamed HMS Bonaventure in 1660, rebuilt in 1666 and broken up for a rebuild in 1711. Re-launched in 1711 as a 50-gun fourth rate. Renamed Argyll in 1715, rebuilt in 1722 and sunk as a breakwater in 1748.
- West Friesland 54 (1665) – a prize, Westfriesland, captured from the Dutch, sold 1667
- Seven Oaks 52 (1665) – a prize, Zevenwolden, captured from the Dutch, retaken by them 1666
- Charles V 52 (1665) – a prize, Carolus Quintus, captured from the Dutch, burned by them 1667
- Guilder de Ruyter 50 (1665) – a prize, Geldersche Ruiter, captured from the Dutch, sold 1667
- Maria Sancta 50 (1665) – a prize, Sint Marie, captured from the Dutch, burned by them 1667
- Mars 50 (1665) – a prize, Mars, captured from the Dutch, sold 1667
- Delft 48 (1665) – a prize, Delft, captured from the Dutch, sold 1668
- St Paul 48 (1665) – a prize, Sint Paulus, captured from the Dutch, burned in action 1666
- Hope 44 (1665) – a prize, Hoop, captured from the Dutch, wrecked 1666
- Black Spread Eagle 44 (1665) – a prize, Groningen, captured from the Dutch, sunk in action 1666.
- Golden Lion 42 (1665) – a prize, Gouden Leeuw, captured from the Dutch, given to Guinea Company 1668
- Zealand 42 (1665) – a prize, Zeelandia, captured from the Dutch, sold 1667
- Unity 42 (1665) – a prize, Eendracht, captured from the Dutch, retaken by them 1667
- Young Prince 38 (1665) – a prize, Jonge Prins, captured from the Dutch, expended as a fireship 1666
- Black Bull 36 (1665) – a prize, Edam, captured from the Dutch, retaken and sunk by them 1666
- St Patrick 48 (1666) – captured by the Dutch 1667
- Greenwich 54 (1666) – rebuilt 1699
- St David 54 (1667) – sunk at Portsmouth 1690, raised but sold 1713
- Stathouse van Harlem 46 (1667) – a prize, Raadhuis van Haarlem, captured from the Dutch, sunk as a breakwater at Sheerness 1690
- Stavoreen 48 (1672) – a prize captured from the Dutch, sold 1682
- Arms of Terver 48 (1673) – a prize captured from the Dutch, sold 1682
- Oxford 54 (1674) – rebuilt 1702.
- Woolwich 54 (1675) – rebuilt 1702
- Kingfisher 46 (1675) – a specialised fourth-rate designed for a role similar to that of the Q-ships of 1914–18, rather than for the battle fleet; rebuilt 1699

The above list excludes two smaller fourth-rates not designed for the line of battle—the galley-frigates Charles Galley and James Galley of 1676. It also excludes four fifth-rates of 36 guns (the Falcon and Sweepstakes of 1666, the Nonsuch of 1668, and the Phoenix of 1671) which were re-classed as 42-gun fourth rates some years after their original completion, but later reverted to being fifth-rates.

== The "Thirty Ships" programme of 1677 (1677–88) ==
- First rate of 100 guns
  - Britannia 100 (28 June 1682) – broken up 1715
- Second rates of 90 guns
  - Vanguard 90 (November 1678) – wrecked in the Great Storm of 1703
  - Windsor Castle 90 (4 March 1679) – wrecked 1693
  - Sandwich 90 (May 1679) – rebuilt 1709–1715; lazarette 1752, broken up 1770
  - Duchess 90 (May 1679) – renamed Princess Anne 31 December 1701, renamed Windsor Castle 17 March 1702, renamed Blenheim 18 December 1706; rebuilt 1708–09; broken up 1763.
  - Albemarle 90 (29 October 1680) – rebuilt 1701–04; renamed Union 29 December 1709, broken up 1749
  - Neptune 90 (17 April 1683) – rebuilt 1708–10
  - Duke 90 (13 June 1682) – rebuilt 1700–01 and renamed Prince George 31 December 1701; broken up to rebuild 1719
  - Ossory 90 (24 August 1682) – rebuilt 1708–11 and renamed Princess 2 January 1716, then Princess Royal 26 July 1728
  - Coronation 90 (23 May 1685) – wrecked 1691
- Third rates of 70 guns
  - Lenox 70 (18 April 1678) - rebuilt 1701
  - Hampton Court 70 (10 July 1678) - rebuilt 1701
  - Anne 70 (November 1678) – Burnt to avoid capture 6 July 1690
  - Captain 70 (1678)
  - Restoration 70 (28 May 1678) – wrecked in the Great Storm of 1703
  - Berwick 70 (May 1679) - rebuilt 1700
  - Burford 70 (November 1679) - rebuilt 1699
  - Eagle 70 (31 January 1679) - rebuilt 1699
  - Expedition 70 (10 September 1679) – rebuilt 1699, renamed Prince Frederick 1715, sold 1784
  - Grafton 70 (17 May 1679) - rebuilt 1700
  - Pendennis 70 (1679) – wrecked 26 October 1689
  - Northumberland 70 (1679) – rebuilt 1699-1702, then wrecked in the Great Storm of 1703
  - Essex 70 (20 February 1679) – broken up 1736 for rebuild
  - Kent 70 (20 February 1679) - rebuilt 1697-99
  - Exeter 70 (March 1680) – hulked 1691
  - Suffolk 70 (May 1680) – broken up by 1765
  - Hope 70 (late 1678) – captured 1695
  - Elizabeth 70 (3 March 1679) – rebuilt 1703
  - Stirling Castle 70 (29 July 1679) – wrecked in the Great Storm of 1703
  - Breda 70 (26 September 1679) – burnt 1690

=== New fourth rates (1683–88) ===
- Mordaunt 46 (c. 1681) – built privately and purchased 1683. wrecked 1693
- Deptford 50 (1687) – broken up 1700 for rebuild
- St Albans 50 (1687) – wrecked 1693
- Sedgemoor 50 (1687) – wrecked 1689

=== Major rebuilds (1677–88) ===
- Royal Sovereign (first rate) 100 (1685) – burnt by accident 29 January 1696
- Mary (third rate) 60 (1688) – wrecked in Great Storm 27 November 1703
- Tiger (fourth rate) 44 (1681) – rebuilt 1701–03
- Bonaventure (fourth rate) 48 (1683) – rebuilt 1699
- Hampshire (fourth rate) 46 (1686) – sunk in action 26 August 1697
- Assistance (fourth rate) 48 (1687) – rebuilt 1699
- Ruby (fourth rate) 48 (1687) – rebuilt 1704–06

=== Captures – ex-Algerines ===
The Royal Navy took into service as fourth rates the following ships captured from the Algerines (Algerian corsairs)

- Marigold 44 (ex-Algerine Marygold, captured 28 October 1677) – wrecked 1679
- Tiger Prize 48 (ex-Algerine, captured 1 April 1678) – sunk as a breakwater 1696
- Golden Horse 46 (ex-Algerine Golden Horse, captured 9 April 1681) – sunk as a breakwater 1688
- Half Moon 44 (ex-Algerine Half Moon, captured 9 September 1681) – burnt by accident 1686
- Two Lions 44 (ex-Algerine Two Lions, captured 16 September 1681) – sold 1688

== List of ships-of-the-line of the Royal Navy (1688–97) ==
Number of main guns follows name (see rating system of the Royal Navy)
Except where stated otherwise, these ships are listed in the order of pp. 163–165 The Ship of the Line Volume I, by Brian Lavery, pub Conways, 1983, ISBN 0-85177-252-8

=== The "Twenty-Seven Ships" programme of 1691 ===
This programme was approved by Parliament on 10 October 1690. While nominally it comprised 17 third rates of 80 guns and ten fourth rates of 60 guns, funds for three third rates of 70 guns were provided at virtually the same date as the Programme, which should thus strictly speaking refer to Thirty Ships.

- Two-decker third rates of 80 guns
  - Devonshire 80 (1692) – blew up at the Battle at The Lizard, 1707
  - Cornwall 80 (1692)
  - Boyne 80 (1692) – broken up by 1763
  - Russell 80 (1692)
  - Norfolk 80 (1693)
  - Humber 80 (1693)
  - Sussex 80 (1693) – wrecked 1694
  - Torbay 80 (1693)
  - Lancaster 80 (1694)
  - Dorsetshire 80 (1694)
  - Cambridge 80 (1695)
  - Chichester 80 (1695)
  - Newark 80 (1695)
- Three-decker third rates of 80 guns.

These four were originally intended to be two-deckers, like the other 13, but were completed as three-deckers.

  - Shrewsbury 80 (1695)
  - Cumberland 80 (1695) – captured by France at the Battle at The Lizard, 1707, to Genoa 1715, to Spain 1717 as Principe de Asturias 70, captured by Britain at the Battle of Cape Passaro, 1718, to Austria 1720 as San Carlos, broken up 1733
  - Ranelagh 80 (1697) – renamed Princess Caroline 1728
  - Somerset 80 (1698) – broken up 1740
- Third rates of 70 guns
  - Bredah 70 (1692) – broken up 1730
  - Ipswich 70 (1693) – broken up 1727 to rebuild
  - Yarmouth 70 (1695) – broken up 1707 and rebuilt 1707–09; hulked 1740, sold or broken up 1769
- Fourth rates of 60 guns
  - Medway 60 (1693)
  - Carlisle 60 (1693) – wrecked 1696
  - Winchester 60 (1693) – sank 1695
  - Canterbury 60 (1693)
  - Sunderland 60 (1694) – scuttled 1737
  - Pembroke 60 (1694) – captured 1709
  - Gloucester 60 (1695) – broken up 1731
  - Windsor 60 (1695)
  - Kingston 60 (1697)
  - Exeter 60 (1697)

=== Other third rates ===
- 70-gun ships, ordered 1695
  - Bedford 70 (1698) – rebuilt 1741
  - Orford 70 (1698) – rebuilt 1712
  - Nassau 70 (1699) – wrecked 1706
  - Revenge 70 (1699) – renamed Buckingham 1711, hulk 1727, scuttled as a foundation 1745
- 64-gun ship
  - Dreadnought 64 (1691) – reduced to fourth rate 1697, rebuilt 1706

=== Second rates of 90 guns, ordered 1695 ===
- Association 90 (1697) – wrecked 1707
- Barfleur 90 (1697) – rebuilt 1716 at 80-gun ship
- Namur 90 (1697) – rebuilt 1729
- Triumph 90 (1698) – renamed Prince 1714, rebuilt 1750

=== Fourth rates of 50 guns ===
The split between 123 ft groups and 130 ft groups is not in Lavery, but in the previous version of this list on Wikipedia. However the split is supported by data in The 50-Gun Ship and in British Warships in the Age of Sail 1603–1714.

- Ordered 1690 (123 ft group)
  - Chatham (1691) – broken up 1718 for rebuild
  - Centurion (1691) – broken up 1728 for rebuild
  - Chester (1691) – captured by France at the Battle at The Lizard, 1707
  - Norwich (1691) – wrecked 1692
- Ordered 1690 (130 ft prototype)
  - Weymouth (1693) – broken up 1717 for rebuild
- Ordered 1692 (123 ft group)
  - Falmouth (1693) – captured by France 1704
  - Rochester (1693) – broken up 1714 for rebuild
  - Portland (1693) – broken up 1719 for rebuild
  - Southampton (1693) – broken up 1699 for rebuild
  - Norwich (1693) – broken up 1712 for rebuild
  - Dartmouth (1693) – captured by France 1695, recaptured 1702, renamed Vigo, wrecked 1703
  - Anglesea (1694) – broken up 1719
- Ordered 16 November 1693 (130 ft group)
  - Colchester (23 October 1694) – wrecked 1704
  - Romney (23 October 1694) – wrecked 1707
  - Lichfield (4 February 1695) – broken up 1720 for rebuild
  - Lincoln (19 February 1695) – sank 1703
  - Coventry (20 April 1695) – captured by France 1704, recaptured 1709
  - Severn (16 September 1695) – broken up 1734 for rebuild
  - Burlington (16 September 1695) – broken up 1733
- Ordered 18 November 1694 (130 ft group)
  - Harwich (14 September 1695) – wrecked 1700
  - Pendennis (15 October 1695) – captured by France 1705
- Ordered 1695 (130 ft group)
  - Blackwall (1696) – captured by France 1705
  - Guernsey (1696) – broken up 1716 for rebuild
  - Nonsuch (1696) – broken up 1716 for rebuild
  - Warwick (1696) – broken up 1709 for rebuild
  - Hampshire 50 (1698) – broken up 1739
  - Winchester 50 (1698) – broken up 1716 for rebuild
  - Salisbury 50 (1698) – captured by France 1703, recaptured 1708, renamed Salisbury Prize, renamed Preston 1716, broken up 1739 for rebuild
  - Worcester 50 (1698) – broken up 1713 for rebuild
  - Dartmouth 42 (1698) – broken up 1714 for rebuild
  - Jersey 50 (1698) – hulked 1731, sunk 1763
  - Carlisle 50 (1698) – blew up 1700
  - Tilbury 50 (1699) – broken up 1726 for rebuild
- Other 50-Gun Ships (purchased)
  - Falkland (c. 1690) – built by Holland at Newcastle, New England and purchased 1696, rebuilt 1702

=== Major rebuilds ===
- First rates
  - Royal William 100 (1692) – ex-Prince, rebuilt 1719
  - Queen 100 (1693) – ex-Royal Charles, rebuilt 1715, renamed Royal George
  - Victory 100 (1695) – ex-Royal James, burnt 1721 and broken up
- Third rates
  - Royal Oak 74 (1690) – rebuilt 1713
  - Defiance 64 (1695) – rebuilt 1707
  - Swiftsure 66 (1696) – rebuilt 1716 and renamed Revenge
- Fourth rates
  - Crown 46 (1689) – rebuilt 1703–04
  - Dragon 46 (1690) – rebuilt 1706–07
  - Newcastle 52 (1692) – foundered during Great Storm of 1703
  - Bristol 50 (1693) – captured 1709
  - Dover 50 (1695) – rebuilt 1716

=== Captured ships, War of 1689–1697 ===
- Content 70 (1686) – ex-French captured 29 January 1695, hulk 1703, sold 1715
- Ruby Prize 48 (1695) – ex-French captured 1695, sold 1698
- Trident 58 (1695) – ex-French, captured 29 January 1695, scuttled as breakwater 1701
- Medway Prize 50 (1697) – ex-French privateer, captured 30 April 1697 and then purchased for the Navy 20 August 1697, hulk 1699, scuttled as a foundation 1712

== List of ships-of-the-line of the Royal Navy (1697–1719) ==
Number of main guns follows name (see rating system of the Royal Navy)
Except where stated otherwise, these ships are listed in the order of pp. 165–169 The Ship of the Line Volume I, by Brian Lavery, pub Conways, 1983, ISBN 0-85177-252-8

=== First rates of 100 guns, rebuilt 1697–1719 ===
- Royal Sovereign 100 (1701) – broken up 1768
- Royal Anne 100 (1703) – ex-St Andrew, broken up 1757
- London 100 (1706) – enlarged 1721 to 1,711 tons, broken up 1747
- Royal George 100 (1715) – ex-Queen, renamed Royal Anne 1756, broken up 1767
- Britannia 100 (1719) – harbour service 1745, broken up 1749
- Royal William 100 (1719) – reduced to 84 guns, broken up 1813

=== New ships, pre-Establishment, 1697–1706 ===
- Third rates of 70 guns
  - Northumberland 70 (1705) – rebuilt 1721
  - Stirling Castle 70 (1705) – rebuilt 1723
  - Resolution 70 (1705) – ran aground 1707
  - Nassau 70 (1707) – rebuilt 1740
  - Elizabeth 70 (1706) – rebuilt 1737
  - Restoration 70 (1706) – wrecked 1711
- Fourth rates of 60 guns
  - Nottingham 60 (1703) – rebuilt 1719
  - Mary 60 (1704) – rebuilt 1742 and renamed Princess Mary
  - York 60 (1706) – lengthened 1738, sunk as a breakwater 1750
- Fourth rates of 50 guns, 130 ft group
  - Swallow 50 (1703) – rebuilt 1719
  - Antelope 50 (1703) – rebuilt 1741
  - Leopard 50 (1703) – rebuilt 1721
  - Panther 50 (1703) – rebuilt 1716
  - Newcastle 50 (1704) – rebuilt 1732
  - Reserve 50 (1704) – renamed Sutherland 1716, hospital ship 1741, broken up 1754
  - Saint Albans 50 (1706) – rebuilt 1737
  - Colchester 50 (1707) – rebuilt 1721

=== Rebuilds, pre-Establishment, 1697–1706 ===
- Second rates of 90 guns
  - Prince George 90 (1701) – ex-Duke, rebuilt 1723
  - St George 90 (1701) – ex-Charles, rebuilt 1740
  - Royal Katherine 90 (1702) – renamed Ramillies 1706, rebuilt 1749
  - Union 90 (1704) – ex-Albemarle, rebuilt 1726
- Third rates of 80 guns
  - Devonshire 80 (1704) – blown up in action 1707
  - Chichester 80 (1706) – broken up 1749
  - Cornwall 80 (1706) – rebuilt 1726
- Third rates of 70 guns
  - Resolution 70 (1698) – foundered 1703
  - Burford 70 (1699) – wrecked 1719
  - Eagle 70 (1699) – wrecked 1707
  - Expedition 70 (1699) – rebuilt 1714 and renamed Prince Frederick
  - Kent 70 (1699) – rebuilt 1724
  - Stirling Castle 70 (1699) – wrecked 1703
  - Suffolk 70 (1699) – rebuilt 1719
  - Berwick 70 (1700) – hulked 1715, broken up 1723
  - Edgar 70 (1700) – rebuilt 1709
  - Essex 70 (1700) – rebuilt 1713
  - Grafton 70 (1700) – captured 1707
  - Hampton Court 70 (1701) – captured 1707
  - Lenox 70 (1701) – rebuilt 1723
  - Northumberland 70 (1702) – wrecked 1703
  - Restoration 70 (1702) – wrecked 1703
  - Elizabeth 70 (1704) – captured 1704
- Third rates of 66 guns
  - Monmouth 66 (1700) – rebuilt 1718
  - Warspite 66 (1702) – renamed Edinburgh, rebuilt 1721
  - Rupert 66 (1703) – rebuild of 1666 Rupert to different design, reduced to fourth rate 1716, broken up 1736 (then rebuilt again from 1737 to 1740)
  - Defiance 66 (1707) – reduced to fourth rate 1716, hulk 1743, broken up 1749
- Fourth rates of 60 guns
  - Montague 60 (1698) – rebuilt 1716
  - Monck 60 (1702) – wrecked 1720
  - Dunkirk 60 (1704) – rebuilt 1734
  - Plymouth 60 (1705) – foundered 1705
  - Dreadnought 60 (1706) – enlarged 1722, hulked 1740, broken up 1748
- Fourth rates of 46–54 guns
  - Advice (1698) – captured 1711
  - Assistance (1699) – rebuilt 1712
  - Bonaventure (1699) – rebuilt 1711
  - Greenwich (1699) – rebuilt 1730
  - Kingfisher (1699) – hulked 1706, broken up 1728
  - Deptford (1700) – rebuilt 1719
  - Southampton (1700) – hulked 1728, broken up 1771
  - Reserve (1701) – foundered 1703
  - Tiger (1702) – rebuilt 1722
  - Falkland (1702) – rebuilt 1720
  - Crown (1704) – wrecked 1719
  - Ruby (1706) – captured 1707

=== 1706 Establishment ===
The 1706 Establishment established a desired set of principal dimensions for each group (i.e. size) of warship from the 40-gun fifth rate up to the 90-gun second rate (first rates and ships of less than 40 guns were not covered by the 1706 Establishment). As only the principal dimensions were specified, the design of individual ships remained with the Master Shipwright in each Dockyard; thus ships of the same number of guns built to this Establishment did not constitute a class in the modern sense of all being built to one design.

- Second rates of 90 guns

The seven Second rates of this Establishment were ordered as 96-gun vessels under the ordnance specification of the 1703 Guns Establishment, but the subsequent 1716 Guns Establishment reduced this armament to 90 guns.

  - Marlborough 90 (1706) – ex-St Michael, rebuilt 1732
  - Blenheim 90 (1709) – ex-Duchess, broken up 1763
  - Neptune 90 (1710) – rebuilt 1730
  - Vanguard 90 (1710) – rebuilt 1739 and renamed Duke
  - Princess 90 (1711) – ex-Ossory, renamed Princess Royal 1728, broken up 1773
  - Sandwich 90 (1712) – broken up 1770
  - Barfleur 90 (1716) – hulked 1764, broken up 1783
- Third rates of 80 guns

The ten three-decker third rates of this Establishment were ordered as 80-gun vessels under the ordnance specification of the 1703 Guns Establishment, while the subsequent 1716 Guns Establishment retained this total (while making slight adjustments).

  - Boyne 80 (1708) – rebuilt 1739
  - Humber 80 (1708) – rebuilt 1726 and renamed Princess Amelia
  - Russell 80 (1709) – rebuilt 1735
  - Cumberland 80 (1710) – broken up 1731 and rebuilt 1739
  - Devonshire 80 (1710) – hulk 1740, sold 1760
  - Dorsetshire 80 (1712) – sold 1749
  - Shrewsbury 80 (1713) – broken up 1749
  - Cambridge 80 (1715) – broken up 1749
  - Torbay 80 (1719) – broken up 1749
  - Newark 80 (1717) – rebuilt 1747
- Third rates of 70 guns
  - Resolution 70 (1708) – wrecked 1711
  - Captain 70 (1708) – rebuilt 1722
  - Grafton 70 (1709) – rebuilt 1725
  - Hampton Court 70 (1709) – rebuilt 1744
  - Edgar 70 (1709) – burnt 1711
  - Yarmouth 70 (1709) – hulked 1740
  - Orford 70 (1713) – rebuilt 1727
  - Royal Oak 70 (1713) – rebuilt 1741
  - Expedition 70 (1714) – renamed Prince Frederick 1715, rebuilt 1740
  - Monmouth 70 (1718) – rebuilt 1742
  - Revenge 70 (1718) – rebuilt 1742
  - Suffolk 70 (1718) – rebuilt 1739
- Fourth rates of 60 guns
  - Plymouth 60 (1708) – rebuilt 1722
  - Lion 60 (1709) – rebuilt 1738
  - Gloucester 60 (1709) – captured 1709
  - Rippon 60 (1712) – rebuilt 1735
  - Montague 60 (1716) – broken up 1749
  - Medway 60 (1718) – hulk 1740, broken up 1749
  - Kingston 60 (1719) – rebuilt 1740
  - Nottingham 60 (1719) – rebuilt 1745
- Fourth rates of 50 guns

The first nineteen of the following vessels were ordered between 1706 and 1714 as 54-gun vessels, armed under the 1703 Guns Establishment with a main battery of 12-pounder guns. Under the 1716 Guns Establishment, the 54-gun ship was superseded by a 50-gun ship with a main battery of 18-pounder guns. The last ten ships listed below were ordered from 1715 onward which were established and armed to the 1716 Guns Establishment, and the existing 54-gun ships were re-armed to this standard as each came into a dockyard for refitting and opportunity allowed.

  - Salisbury 50 (1707) – rebuilt 1717
  - Dragon 50 (1707) – wrecked 1712
  - Falmouth 50 (1708) – rebuilt 1729
  - Pembroke 50 (1710) – broken up 1726
  - Ruby 50 (1708) – renamed Mermaid and reduced to 44-gun fifth rate May 1744, sold 1748
  - Chester 50 (1708) – harbour service 1743, broken up 1749
  - Romney 50 (1708) – rebuilt 1726
  - Bonaventure 50 (1711) – renamed Argyll 1715, rebuilt 1722
  - Bristol 50 (1711) – broken up 1742, rebuilt 1746
  - Warwick 50 (1711) – broken up 1726
  - Ormonde 50 (1711) – renamed Dragon 1715, broken up 1733 for rebuild
  - Assistance 50 (1713) – rebuilt 1725
  - Gloucester 50 (1711) – rebuilt 1737
  - Advice 50 (1712) – renamed Milford and reduced to 44-gun fifth rate 1744, sold 1749
  - Strafford 50 (1714) – broken up 1733
  - Worcester 50 (1714) – broken up 1733
  - Panther 50 (1716) – hulked 1743, sold 1768
  - Dartmouth 50 (1716) – rebuilt 1741
  - Rochester 50 (1716) – renamed Maidstone hospital ship 1744, broken up 1748
  - Nonsuch 50 (1717) – hulked 1740, broken up 1745
  - Salisbury 50 (1717) – rebuilt 1726
  - Winchester 50 (1717) – hulked 1744, broken up 1781
  - St Albans 50 (1718) – broken up 1734
  - Guernsey 50 (1717) – rebuilt 1740
  - Norwich 50 (1718) – renamed Enterprise and reduced to 44-gun fifth rate 1744, broken up 1771
  - Deptford 50 (1719) – sold 1725
  - Tiger 50 (1722) – wrecked 1742
  - Weymouth 50 (1719) – broken up 1732
  - Swallow 50 (1719) – broken up 1728
- Fifth rates of 40–44 guns

These small two-decker warships were not ships of the line as they were not powerful enough to stand in the line of battle. They were informally described as frigates and are included in the article on that topic.

=== Captured ships, War of Spanish Succession ===
- Prompt Prize 80 (third rate) (1692, ex-French Prompt 76, captured 12 October 1702), sunk as a wharf 1703
- Assurance 70 (third rate) (1697, ex-French Assuré 66, captured 12 October 1702), broken up 1712
- Ferme 70 (third rate) (1700, ex-French Ferme, captured 12 October 1702), sold 1713
- Moderate 64 (fourth rate) (1685, ex-French Modéré, captured 12 October 1702), sold 1713
- Triton 42 (fifth rate, i.e. not a ship of the line) (1697, ex-French Triton, captured 12 October 1702) – sold 1709
- Hazardous 54 (fourth rate) (1701, ex-French Hasardeux, captured 14 November 1703) – wrecked 19 November 1706
- Falkland Prize 54 (fourth rate) (1698, ex-French flûte Seine, captured 15 July 1704) – wrecked 1705 and sold 1706
- Arrogant 60 (fourth rate) (1685, ex-French Arrogant, captured 20 March 1705), foundered 1709
- Auguste 60 (fourth rate) (1704, ex-French Auguste, captured 8 August 1705), wrecked 1716
- Superb 64 (fourth rate) (1708, ex-French Superbe, captured 29 July 1710), broken up 1732
- Moor 54 (fourth rate) (1688, ex-French Maure, captured 13 December 1710, scuttled as a breakwater 1716

== List of ships-of-the-line of the Royal Navy (1719–41) ==
Number of main guns follows name (see rating system of the Royal Navy)
Except where stated otherwise, these ships are listed in the order of pp. 169–171 The Ship of the Line Volume I, by Brian Lavery, pub Conways, 1983, ISBN 0-85177-252-8

=== 1719 Establishment ===
- First rates of 100 guns
  - Royal Sovereign 100 (1728) – broken up 1768
- Second rates of 90 guns
  - Prince George 90 (1723) – Burnt by accident 1768
  - Union 90 (1726) – broken up 1749
  - Namur 90 (1729) – reduced to 74 guns 1745, wrecked 1749
  - Neptune 90 (1730) – renamed Torbay and reduced to 74 guns 1750, sold 1784
  - Marlborough 90 (1732) – reduced to 68 guns 1752, foundered 1762
- Third rates of 80 guns
  - Lancaster 80 (1722) – rebuilt 1749
  - Princess Amelia 80 (1723) – ex-Humber, broken up 1752
  - Cornwall 80 (1726) – broken up 1761
  - Norfolk 80 (1728) – renamed Princess Amelia 1755, broken up 1757
  - Somerset 80 (1731) – broken up 1746
  - Princess Caroline 80 (1731) – ex-Ranelagh, broken up 1764
  - Russell 80 (1735) – sunk as a breakwater 1762
- Third rates of 70 guns
  - Edinburgh 70 (1721) – ex-Warspite, rebuilt 1744
  - Northumberland 70 (1721) – rebuilt 1743
  - Burford 70 (1722) – broken up 1752
  - Captain 70 (1722) – hulked 1739, broken up 1762
  - Stirling Castle 70 (1723) – hulked 1739, broken up 1771
  - Berwick 70 (1723) – hulked 1743, broken up 1763
  - Lenox 70 (1723) – sunk as a breakwater 1756
  - Kent 70 (1724) – broken up 1744
  - Grafton 70 (1725) – broken up 1744
  - Ipswich 70 (1730) – hulked 1757, broken up 1764
  - Buckingham 70 (1731) – broken up 1745
  - Prince of Orange 70 (1734) – reduced to 60 guns 1748, sheer hulk 1772, sold 1810
- Fourth rates of 60 guns
  - Canterbury 60 (1722) – rebuilt 1744
  - Plymouth 60 (1722) – broken up 1764
  - Sunderland 60 (1724) – rebuilt 1744
  - Windsor 60 (1729) – rebuilt 1745
  - Deptford 60 (1732) – reduced to 50 guns 1752, sold 1767
  - Swallow 60 (1732) – broken up 1742
  - Tilbury 60 (1733) – burnt 1742
  - Warwick 60 (1733) – captured 1756
  - Pembroke 60 (1733) – wrecked 1749
  - Dunkirk 60 (1734) – wrecked 1749
- Fourth rates of 50 guns
  - Falkland 50 (1720) – rebuilt 1744
  - Chatham 50 (1721) – sunk as a breakwater 1749
  - Colchester 50 (1721) – broken up 1742
  - Leopard 50 (1721) – broken up 1739
  - Argyll 50 (1722) – sunk as a breakwater 1748
  - Portland 50 (1723) – broken up 1743
  - Assistance 50 (1725) – sunk as a breakwater 1745
  - Romney 50 (1726) – sold 1757
  - Salisbury 50 (1726) – hulked 1744, sold 1749
  - Oxford 50 (1727) – broken up 1758
  - Falmouth 50 (1729) – broken up 1747
  - Lichfield 50 (1730) – broken up 1744
  - Greenwich 50 (1730) – wrecked 1744
  - Newcastle 50 (1732) – broken up 1746
- Fifth rates of 40–44 guns

These small two-decker warships were not ships of the line as they were not powerful enough to stand in the line of battle. They were informally described as frigates and are included in the article on that topic.

=== Non-Establishment 60-gun ships ===
- Centurion 60 (1732) – Used by Anson in his world voyage, reduced to 50 guns 1744, broken up 1769
- Rippon 60 (1735) – broken up 1751

=== 1733 Proposals ===
- First rate of 100 guns
  - Victory 100 (1737) – wrecked 1744
- Second rates of 90 guns
  - Duke 90 (1739) – broken up 1769
  - St George 90 (1740) – broken up 1774
- Third rates of 80 guns
  - Boyne 80 (1739) – broken up 1763
  - Cumberland 80 (1739) – reduced to 66 guns in 1747, foundered 1760
- Third rates of 70 guns
  - Elizabeth 70 (1737) – broken up 1766
  - Suffolk 70 (1739) – broken up 1765
  - Essex 70 (1740) – wrecked 1759
  - Nassau 70 (1740) – sold 1770
  - Prince Frederick 70 (1740) – sold 1784
  - Bedford 70 (1741) – hulked 1767, sold 1787
  - Royal Oak 70 (1741) – hulked 1757, broken up 1763
  - Stirling Castle 70 (1742) – lost 1762
  - Monmouth 70 (1742) – broken up 1767
  - Revenge 70 (1742) – sold 1787
  - Captain 70 (1743) – reduced to 64 guns 1760, storeship 1777, broken up 1783
  - Berwick 70 (1743) – broken up 1760
- Fourth rates of 60 guns
  - Strafford 60 (1735) – scuttled as a breakwater 1756
  - Worcester 60 (1735) – broken up 1765
  - Weymouth 60 (1736) – wrecked 1745
  - Augusta 60 (1736) – broken up 1765
  - Dragon 60 (1736) – scuttled as breakwater 1757
  - Jersey 60 (1736) – hospital ship 1771, abandoned 1783
  - Superb 60 (1736) – broken up 1757
  - Lion 60 (1738) – sold 1765
  - Kingston 60 (1740) – sold 1762
  - Rupert 60 (1740) – Rebuild of 1713 Rupert to a different design, broken up 1769
  - Dreadnought 60 (1742) – sold 1784
  - Medway 60 (1740) – broken up 1749
  - Princess Mary 60 (1742) – Sold 1762
  - Exeter 60 (1744) – broken up 1763
  - Nottingham 60 (1745) – scuttled as breakwater 1773
- Fourth rates of 50 guns
  - Gloucester 50 (1737) – damaged in storm and burnt to avoid capture 1742
  - St Albans 50 (1737) – wrecked 1744
  - Severn 50 (1739) – captured by France 1746
  - Guernsey 50 (1740) – hulk 1769, sold 1786
  - Hampshire 50 (1741) – broken up 1766
  - Leopard 50 (1741) – broken up 1761
  - Nonsuch 50 (1741) – broken up 1766
  - Sutherland 50 (1741) – sold 1770
  - Antelope 50 (1742) – sold 1783
  - Dartmouth 50 (1741) – sunk 1747 in action with the Spanish ship of the line Glorioso
  - Woolwich 50 (1741) – broken up 1747
  - Preston 50 (1742) – hulk 1748, broken up 1749

=== Smaller ships (fifth rates) ===
These small two-decker warships were not ships of the line as they were not powerful enough to stand in the line of battle. They were informally described as frigates and are included in the article on that topic.

== List of ships-of-the-line of the Royal Navy (1741–55) ==
Number of main guns follows name (see rating system of the Royal Navy)
Except where stated otherwise, these ships are listed in the order of pp. 171-175 The Ship of the Line Volume I, by Brian Lavery, pub Conways, 1983, ISBN 0-85177-252-8

=== 1741 proposals ===
- First rates of 100 guns

None built

- Second rates of 90 guns
  - Ramillies 90 (1749) – wrecked 1760
  - Prince 90 (1750) – broken up 1773
- Third rates of 80 guns
  - Newark 80 (1747) – broken up 1787
  - Lancaster 80 (1749) – completed as a ship of 66 guns. broken up 1773
  - Devonshire 80 (1745) – cut down and reduced to a 74-gun ship 1747, then immediately reduced further to a 66-gun ship. Broken up 1772
  - Culloden 80 (1747) – re-ordered and completed as a ship of 74 guns. sold 1770
  - Somerset 80 (-) – re-ordered as a ship of 66 guns, but cancelled 1748
- Third rates of 70 guns (the ships were all re-classed as 64-gun ships)
  - Northumberland 66 (1743) – captured 1744
  - Edinburgh 66 (1744) – broken up 1771
  - Hampton Court 66 (1744) – broken up 1774
  - Kent 64 (1746) – hulked 1760
- modified from the 1741 Establishment (lengthened by 6 ft)
  - Yarmouth 64 (1745) – reduced to 60 guns in 1781, broken up 1811
- Fourth rates of 58 guns (classed as 58s, those ships actually had 62 gun ports)
  - Princess Louisa 58 (1744) – broken up 1766
  - Defiance 58 (1744) – sold 1766
  - Canterbury 58 (1744) – harbour service 1761, broken up 1770
  - Sunderland 58 (1745) – foundered 1761
  - Tilbury 58 (1745) – foundered 1757
  - Eagle 58 (1745) – sold 1767
- Non-Establishment 60 gun ship
  - Windsor 58 (1745) – sold 1777
- Fourth rates of 50 guns
  - Chester 50 (1743) – sold 1767
  - Harwich 50 (1743) – wrecked 1760
  - Winchester 50 (1744) – sold 1769
  - Maidstone 50 (1744) – wrecked 1747
  - Colchester 50 (1744) – wrecked 1744
  - Portland 50 (1744) – sold 1763
  - Falkland 50 (1744) – given to victualling depot 1768
  - Salisbury 50 (1745) – condemned 1761
  - Advice 50 (1745) – broken up 1756
  - Gloucester 50 (1745) – broken up 1764
  - Norwich 50 (1745) – sold 1768
  - Ruby 50 (1745) – broken up 1765
  - Colchester 50 (1746) – broken up 1773
  - Lichfield 50 (1746) – wrecked 1758
  - Panther 50 (1746) – broken up 1756
- Bristol class – Non-Establishment 50-gun ships (lengthened by 6 feet)
  - Bristol (1746) – broken up 1768
  - Rochester (1749) – sold 1770

=== 1745 Establishment ===
- First rates of 100 guns
  - Royal George 100 (1756) – foundered 1782
  - Britannia 100 (1762) – renamed Princess Royal 1810, St George 1812, St Barfleur 1819, broken up 1825
- Second rates of 90 guns

None built

- Third rates of 80 guns
  - Princess Amelia 80 (1757) – lent to customs 1788, sold 1818
- Third rates of 70 guns
  - Vanguard 70 (1748) – sold 1774
  - Somerset 70 (1748) – wrecked 1778
  - Orford 70 (1749) – harbour service 1777, sunk as a breakwater 1783
  - Grafton 70 (1750) – sold 1767
  - Swiftsure 70 (1750) – sold 1773
  - Northumberland 70 (1750) – renamed Leviathan storeship 1777, foundered 1779
  - Buckingham 70 (1751) – renamed Grampus storeship 1771, lost 1778
- Fourth rates of 60 guns
  - St Albans 60 (1747) – sold 1765
  - Anson 60 (1747) – sold 1773
  - Tiger 60 (1747) – hulked 1760, sold 1765
  - Weymouth 60 (1752) – broken up 1772
- Medway class (Allin, modified from the 1745 Establishment)
  - Medway 60 (1755) – receiving ship 1787, broken up 1811
  - York 60 (1753) – broken up 1772
- Fourth rates of 50 guns
  - Assistance 50 (1747) – sold 1773.
  - Greenwich 50 (1747) – captured by France 1757.
  - Tavistock 50 (1747) – hulked 1761, broken up 1768.
  - Falmouth 50 (1752) – abandoned aground 1765.
  - Newcastle 50 (1750) – wrecked 1761.
  - Dartmouth 50 (-) – cancelled 1748.
  - Severn 50 (1747) – sold 1759.
  - Woolwich 50 (-) – cancelled 1748.

=== 1745 Establishment, as amended in 1750 ===
- Second rates of 90 guns
  - Namur 90 (1755) – reduced to 74 in 1805, harbour service 1807, broken up 1833
  - Union 90 (1756) – hospital ship 1799, broken up 1816
  - Neptune 90 (1757) – sheer hulk 1799, broken up 1816
- Third rate of 80 guns
  - Cambridge 80 (1755) – harbour service 1793, broken up 1808
- Third rate of 70 guns
  - Chichester 70 (1753) – broken up 1803
- Fourth rates of 60 guns
- Dunkirk class (Allin)
  - Dunkirk 60 (1754) – harbour service 1778, sold 1792
  - Achilles 60 (1757) – hulked 1778
  - America 60 (1757) – broken up 1771
- Montague class ("Admiralty" design)
  - Montague 60 (1757) – sunk as a breakwater 1774
- Fourth rate of 50 guns
  - Preston 50 (1757) – sheer hulk 1785, broken up 1815.

=== 1745 Establishment, as amended in 1752 ===
- Fourth rates of 60 guns
- Pembroke class, (Allin, lines similar to the draught of the Monarch, a French 74, captured in 1747)
  - Pembroke 60 (1757) – hulked 1776, broken up 1793
- Rippon class (Allin)
  - Rippon 60 (1758) – harbour service 1801, broken up 1808
- Fourth rate of 50 guns
  - Chatham 50 (1758) – harbour service 1793, renamed Tilbury 1805/10, broken up 1814

=== 1745 Establishment, as amended in 1754 ===
- Third rates of 68 guns
- Burford class
  - Burford 68 (1757) – sold 1785
  - Dorsetshire 68 (1757) – broken up 1775
  - Boyne 68 (1766) – broken up 1783

=== 1745 Establishment, as amended in 1756 ===
- Temple class copied from 1745 Establishment Vanguard
  - Temple 68 (1758) – sank 1762
  - Conqueror 68 (1758) – wrecked 1760

=== Captured ships, War of 1739–48 ===
- Princess 70 (1740) – ex-Spanish Princessa captured 8 April 1740, hulk 1760, sold 1784
- Vigilant 58 (1745) – ex-French Le Vigilant captured 19 May 1745, sold 1759
- Portland's Prize 50 (1746) – ex-French L'Auguste, captured 9 February 1746, sold 1749
- Mars 64 (1746) – ex-French Le Mars captured 11 October 1746, wrecked 1755
- Intrepid 64 (1747) – ex-French Le Sérieux captured 3 May 1747 at First Battle of Cape Finisterre, broken up 1765
- Invincible 74 (1747) – ex-French L'Invincible captured 3 May 1747 at First Battle of Cape Finisterre, wrecked 1758
- Isis 50 (1747) – ex-French Le Diamant 56 captured 3 May 1747 at First Battle of Cape Finisterre, sold 1766
- Monarch 74 (1747) – ex-French Le Monarque, captured 14 October 1747 at Second Battle of Cape Finisterre, sold 1760
- Terrible 74 (1747) – ex-French Le Terrible, captured 14 October 1747 at Second Battle of Cape Finisterre, broken up 1763
- Fougueux 64 (1747) – ex-French Le Fougueux captured 14 October 1747 at Second Battle of Cape Finisterre, broken up 1759
- Trident 64 (1747) – ex-French Trident captured 14 October 1747 at Second Battle of Cape Finisterre, sold 1763
- Magnanime 74 (1748) – ex-French Le Magnanime captured 31 January 1748, broken up 1775

==== Other captured ships ====
- Rubis – ex-French Rubis 52, captured 3 May 1747 at First Battle of Cape Finisterre, was added to the Royal Navy as a sixth rate of 26 guns.
- Jason 50 – ex-French Jason, captured 3 May 1747 at First Battle of Cape Finisterre, was added to the Royal Navy as a fifth rate of 44 guns.
- Severn – ex-French Severn 50/56 (originally the British Severn, taken by the French in 1746), was re-captured 14 October 1747 at the Second Battle of Cape Finisterre, but was not restored to British service.
- The ex-French Neptune 70/74, captured 14 October 1747 at Second Battle of Cape Finisterre, was not added to the British Navy.
- Glory – ex-Spanish Glorioso captured 1747, was not added to the British Navy.

=== Other ships ===
Two ships of 74 guns were ordered in January 1748 from Chatham and Woolwich Dockyards, but with the end of the War of Austrian Succession both were cancelled in 1748.

== List of ships-of-the-line of the Royal Navy (1755–85) ==
By or soon after the appointment of Baron George Anson as First Lord of the Admiralty in 1751, the system of establishments that covered the design of British warships was abandoned, and with the appointment of Thomas Slade and William Bately as joint holders of the post of Surveyor of the Navy in 1755, new principles governed the composition of the battle fleet. The Navy Board stopped building any further three-decker 80-gun ships. Production of the 70-gun and 60-gun ships also ceased. Instead, new 74-gun and 64-gun ships replaced these classes. Although 50-gun and 44-gun two-deckers continued to be built for cruising duties, the Navy no longer considered the 50-gun ships powerful enough to serve as ships of the line.

Number of main guns follows name (see rating system of the Royal Navy)

=== First rate of 100 guns (three-deckers) ===
- Victory class (Slade)
  - Victory 100 (1765) – "great repair" 1801–03, flagship at the Battle of Trafalgar 1805, 1805–08 modernised and re-rated as 98-gun second rate, hulked at Portsmouth 1824, dry-docked 1922, converted during the 1920s to her 1805 appearance, preserved in commission at Portsmouth as the only remaining ship of the line
- Royal Sovereign class (Williams)
  - Royal Sovereign 100 (1786) – broken up 1841
- Umpire class (Hunt)
  - Royal George 100 (1788) – broken up 1822
  - Queen Charlotte 100 (1790) – an accidental fire in 1800 destroyed her and killed 673 of her crew of 859
  - Queen Charlotte 104 (1810) – renamed Excellent 1860, broken up 1892

=== Second rates of 90 guns [later 98 guns] (three-deckers) ===
- Sandwich class (Slade)
  - Sandwich 90 (1759) – floating battery 1780, harbour service 1790, broken up 1810
  - Blenheim 90 (1761) – reduced to 74 in 1800; foundered, presumably off Madagascar, with all hands 1807
  - Ocean 90 (1761) – Modified version of the Sandwich class, sold 1793
- London class (Slade)
  - London 90 (1766) – broken up 1811
- Barfleur class (Slade, based on Royal William)
  - Barfleur 90 (1768) – broken up 1819
  - Prince George 90 (1772) – broken up 1839
  - Princess Royal 90 (1773) – broken up 1807
  - Formidable 90/98 (1777) – broken up 1813
- Queen class (Bately)
  - Queen 90 (1769) – reduced to 74 in 1811, broken up 1821
- Duke class (Williams)
  - Duke 98 (1777) – broken up 1843
  - St George 98 (1785) – wrecked 1811 off the coast of Jutland with the loss of almost her entire crew
  - Glory 98 (1788) – broken up 1825
  - Atlas 98 (1782) – broken up 1821
- Revived London class (Slade)
  - Prince 98 (1788) – lengthened by 17 ft in 1796, broken up 1837
  - Impregnable 98 (1786) – wrecked 1799, with no loss of life, on the Chichester Shoals
  - Windsor Castle 98 (1790) – razeed to 74-gun-ship 1814, broken up 1839
- Boyne class (Hunt)
  - Boyne 98 (1790) – caught fire by accident and blew up at Spithead 1795
  - Prince of Wales 98 (1794) – broken up 1822.

=== Third rates of 80 guns (two-deckers) ===
- Caesar class (Hunt)
  - Caesar 80 (1793) – 1814 hulked – used as army depot at Portsmouth, broken up 1821

=== Third rates of 74 guns (two-deckers) ===
- Dublin class (Slade)
  - Dublin 74 (1757) – the first British "74". Broken up 1784
  - Norfolk 74 (1757) – broken up 1774
  - Lenox 74 (1758) – scuttled 1784
  - Mars 74 (1759) – sold 1784
  - Shrewsbury 74 (1758) – condemned 1783
  - Warspite 74 (1758) – broken up 1802
  - Resolution 74 (1758) – wrecked 1759
- Fame class (Bately)
  - Fame 74 (1759) – renamed Guilford c. 1799, sold 1814
- Hero class (Slade)
  - Hero 74 (1759) – broken up 1810
- Hercules class (Slade) – modified Hero class
  - Hercules 74 (1759) – sold 1784
  - Thunderer 74 (1760) – wrecked 1780
- Bellona class (Slade)
  - Bellona 74 (1760) – broken up 1814
  - Dragon 74 (1760) – sold 1784
  - Superb 74 (1760) – wrecked 1783
  - Kent 74 (1762) – sold 1784
  - Defence 74 (1763) – wrecked 1811
- Valiant class – modified Dublin class
  - Valiant (1759) – broken up 1826
  - Triumph (1764) – broken up 1850
- Arrogant class (Slade) – modified Bellona class
  - Arrogant 74 (1761) – broken up 1810
  - Cornwall 74 (1761) – scuttled/burnt 1780
  - Edgar 74 (1779) – broken up 1835
  - Goliath 74 (1781) – razéed to 58 guns 1813, broken up 1815
  - Zealous 74 (1785) – broken up 1816
  - Audacious 74 (1785) – broken up 1815
  - Elephant 74 (1786) – razéed to 58 guns 1818, broken up 1830
  - Bellerophon 74 (1786) – sold 1836
  - Saturn 74 (1786) – razéed to 58 guns 1813, broken up 1868
  - Vanguard 74 (1787) – broken up 1821
  - Excellent 74 (1787) – razéed to 58 guns 1820, broken up 1835
  - Illustrious 74 (1789) – wrecked 1795
- Canada class (Bately)
  - Canada 74 (1765) – re-classed as 76 in 1780, hulked. Receiving ship at Chatham 1810, powder magazine 1814, convict ship 1826, broken up 1834.
  - Majestic 74 (1785) – razéed to 58 guns 1813, broken up 1816
  - Orion 74 (1787) – broken up 1814
  - Captain 74 (1787) – hulked, receiving ship at Plymouth 1809, burnt by accident and broken up 1813
- Albion class (Slade)
  - Albion 74 (1763) – floating battery 1794, wrecked 1797
  - Grafton 74 (1771) – broken up 1816
  - Alcide 74 (1779) – broken up 1817
  - Fortitude 74 (1780) – broken up 1820
  - Irresistible 74 (1782) – broken up 1806
- Ramillies class (Slade)
  - Ramillies 74 (1763) – fire 1782
  - Monarch 74 (1765) – broken up 1813
  - Magnificent 74 (1766) – wrecked 1804
  - Marlborough 74 (1767) – wrecked 1800
- Suffolk class (Bately)
  - Suffolk 74 (1765) – broken up 1803
- Modified Ramillies class (Slade)
  - Terrible 74 (1762) – fire 1781
  - Russell 74 (1764) – sold 1811
  - Invincible 74 (1765) – wrecked 1801
  - Robust 74 (1764) – broken up 1817
  - Prince of Wales 74 (1765) – ex-Hibernia, broken up 1783
- Modified Suffolk class (Bately)
  - Ajax 74 (1765) – sold 1785
- Royal Oak class (Williams)
  - Royal Oak 74 (1769) – broken up 1815
  - Conqueror 74 (1773) – broken up 1794
  - Bedford 74 (1775) – broken up 1817
  - Hector 74 (1774) – broken up 1816
  - Vengeance 74 (1774) – broken up 1816
  - Sultan 74 (1775) – broken up 1816
- Egmont class (Slade)
  - Egmont 74 (1768) – broken up 1799
- Elizabeth class (Slade)
  - Elizabeth 74 (1769) – broken up 1797
  - Resolution 74 (1770) – broken up 1813
  - Cumberland 74 (1774) – broken up 1804
  - Berwick 74 (1775) – captured by France 1795, recaptured and wrecked, 1805
  - Bombay Castle 74 (1782) – wrecked 1796
  - Powerful 74 (1783) – broken up 1812
  - Defiance 74 (1783) – broken up 1817
  - Swiftsure 74 (1787) – captured by France 1801, same name, recaptured at the Battle of Trafalgar, 1805, renamed Irresistible 1805, broken up 1816
- Culloden class (Slade)
  - Culloden 74 (1776) – wrecked 1781
  - Thunderer 74 (1783) – broken up 1814
  - Venerable 74 (1784) – wrecked 1804
  - Victorious 74 (1785) – broken up 1803
  - Ramillies 74 (1785) – broken up 1850
  - Terrible 74 (1785) – broken up 1836
  - Hannibal 74 (1786) – captured by France 1801
  - Theseus 74 (1786) – broken up 1814
- Alfred class (Williams)
  - Alfred 74 (1778) – broken up 1814
  - Alexander 74 (1778) – broken up 1819
  - Warrior 74 (1781) – broken up 1857
  - Montague 74 (1779) – broken up 1818
- Ganges class (Hunt), also known as Culloden class
  - Ganges 74 (1782) – broken up 1816
  - Culloden 74 (1783) – broken up 1813
  - Tremendous 74 (1784) – sold 1897
  - Invincible 74 (1808) – broken up 1861
  - Minden 74 (1810) – sold 1861
  - Minotaur 74 (1816) – renamed Hermes
- Carnatic class built to the lines of the French Courageux (capture of 1761)
  - Leviathan 74 (1790) – hulked 1816
  - Carnatic 74 (1783) – hulked 1805
  - Colossus 74 (1787) – wrecked 1798
  - Minotaur 74 (1793) – wrecked 1810

=== Third rates of 64 guns (two-deckers) ===
- Asia class (Slade)
  - Asia 64 (1764) – broken up 1804
- Essex class (Slade) – modified Asia class
  - Essex 64 (1760) – sold 1779/99
  - Africa 64 (1761) – sold 1774
- St Albans class (Slade)
  - St Albans 64 (1764) – broken up 1814
  - Augusta 64 (1763) – burnt 1777
  - Director 64 (1784) – broken up 1801
- Exeter class (Bately)
  - Exeter 64 (1763) – burnt 1784
  - Europa 64 (1765) – broken up 1814
  - Trident 64 (1768) – sold 1816
  - Prudent 64 (1768) – sold 1814
- Ardent class (Slade)
  - Ardent 64 (1764) – captured 1779, recaptured 1782, sold 1784
  - Raisonnable 64 (1768) – broken up 1815
  - Agamemnon 64 (1781) – wrecked 1809
  - Belliqueux 64 (1781) – broken up 1816
  - Stately 64 (1784)
  - Nassau 64 (1785) – wrecked 1799
  - Indefatigable 64 (1784) – razéed to 44-gun frigate 1794, broken up 1816
- Worcester class (Slade)
  - Worcester 64 (1769) – hulked at Deptford 1788, broken up 1816
  - Lion 64 (1777) – sold for breaking 1837
  - Stirling Castle 64 (1775) – wrecked 1780
- Intrepid class (Williams)
  - Intrepid 64 (1770) – sold for breaking 1828.
  - Monmouth 64 (1772) – broken up 1818.
  - Defiance 64 (1772) – sank 1780.
  - Nonsuch 64 (1774) – broken up 1802.
  - Ruby 64 (1776) – broken up 1821.
  - Vigilant 64 (1774) – broken up 1816.
  - Eagle 64 (1774) – broken up 1812.
  - America 64 (1777) – broken up 1807.
  - Anson 64 (1781) – razéed to 44-gun frigate 1794, wrecked 1807
  - Polyphemus 64 (1782) – broken up 1827.
  - Magnanime 64 (1780) – razéed to 44-gun frigate 1794, broken up 1813.
  - Sampson 64 (1781) – sold for breaking 1832.
  - Repulse 64 (1780) – wrecked 1800.
  - Diadem 64 (1782) – broken up 1832.
  - Standard 64 (1782) – broken up 1816.
- Inflexible class (Williams)
  - Inflexible 64 (1780) – storeship 1793–95, troopship 1800–07, hulked as floating magazine Halifax Nova Scotia 1809, broken up 1820
  - Africa 64 (1781) – hospital ship 1795–1805, broken up 1814
  - Dictator 64 (1783) – troopship 1798–1803, floating battery 1803–05, troopship 1813, broken up 1817
  - Sceptre 64 (1781) – wrecked at Table Bay 5 December 1799
- Crown class (Hunt)
  - Crown 64 (1782) – hulked 1798
  - Ardent 64 (1782) – blew up 1794
  - Scipio 64 (1782) – broken up 1798
  - Veteran 64 (1787) – hulked 1809

=== Fourth rates of 60 guns (two-deckers) ===
- Edgar class (Slade)
  - Edgar 60/64 (1758) – scuttled 1774
  - Panther 60 (1758) – broken up 1813
  - Firm 60 (1759) – sold 1791

=== Fourth rates of 50 guns (two-deckers) ===
Note that from 1756 onward the 50-gun ships were no longer counted as ships of the line as the Navy no longer considered them powerful enough to stand in the line of battle.

- Warwick class (Bately)
  - Warwick 50 (1767) – sold 1802
- Romney class (Slade)
  - Romney 50 (1762) – wrecked 1804, with the loss of nine lives, on the Haaks on South Sand Head due to the fog and the ignorance of the pilots
- Salisbury class (Slade) – modified Romney class
  - Salisbury 50 (1769) – wrecked, without loss of life, 1796 on the Isle of Vache near St. Domingo in the West Indies
  - Centurion 50 (1774) – sank at her moorings at Halifax 1824, refloated, broken up 1825
- Portland class (Williams)
  - Portland 50 (1770) – sold 1817
  - Bristol 50 (1775) – broken up 1810
  - Renown 50 (1774) – broken up 1794
  - Isis 50 (1774) – broken up 1810
  - Leopard 50 (1790) – wrecked 1814 near the Isle of Anacosti in the Saint Lawrence River due to the disobedience and neglect of the officer of the watch
  - Hannibal 50 (1779) – captured by France 1782
  - Jupiter 50 (1778) – wrecked 1808, with no loss of life, in Vigo Bay
  - Leander 50 (1780) – captured by France 1798, captured by Russia 1799, returned to Britain, converted to hospital ship 1806, renamed Hygeia 1813, sold 1817
  - Adamant 50 (1780) – broken up 1814
  - Assistance 50 (1781) – wrecked 1802 on the outer banks of the northern part of Dunkirk Dyke due to the ignorance of her pilot, but with no loss of life due to the help of a Flemish pilot boat
  - Europa 50 (1783) – sold 1814
- Experiment class (Williams)
  - Experiment 50 (1774) – captured by France 1779
  - Medusa 50 (1785) – wrecked 1798
- Grampus class (Hunt)
  - Grampus 50 (1782) – broken up 1794
  - Cato 50 (1782) – disappeared 1782
- Trusty class (Hunt)
  - Trusty 50 (1782) – broken up 1815

=== Captured ships ===
- Alcide 64 (1743, ex-French Alcide, captured 1755); sold 1772
- Lys 64 (1746, ex-French Lys, captured 1755)
- Duc d'Aquitaine 64 (1754, ex-French Duc d'Aquitaine, captured 1757)
- Foudroyant 80 (1750, ex-French Foudroyant, captured 1758); broken up 1787
- Raisonnable 64 (1756, ex-French Rainsonnable, captured 1758); lost 1762
- Bienfaisant 64 (1754, ex-French Bienfaisant, captured 1758); broken up 1814
- Belliqueux 64 (1756, ex-French Belliqueux, captured 1758); broken up 1772
- Modeste 64 (1759, ex-French Modeste, captured 1759); broken up 1800
- Centaur 74 (1757, ex-French Centaure, captured 1759); foundered 1782 with the loss of most of her crew
- Temeraire 74 (1749, ex-French Téméraire, captured 1759); sold 1784
- Formidable 80 (1751, ex-French Formidable, captured 1759); broken up 1768
- Courageux 74 (1753, ex-French Courageux, captured 1761) wrecked 1796
- Belleisle 64 (1760, ex-French Belleisle, captured 1761); sold 1819
- Saint Ann 64 (1759, ex-French Saint Ann, captured 1761)
- San Antonio 70 (1761, ex-Spanish San Antonio, captured 1762); sold 1775
- Prince William 64 (ex-Spanish Guipuscoana, captured 1780) Converted to a Sheer Hulk 1790, broken up 1817
- Gibraltar 80 (1749, ex-Spanish Fenix, captured 1780) – broken up 1836
- Princessa 70 (1750, ex-Spanish Princessa, captured 1780) Converted to a Sheer Hulk 1784, broken up 1809
- Monarca 70 (1756, ex-Spanish Monarca, captured 1780) Sold 1791
- Diligent 70 (1756, ex-Spanish Diligente, captured 1780)
- San Miguel 70 (1773, ex-Spanish San Miguel, captured 1780)
- Prothee 64 (1772, ex-French Protée, captured 1780) Converted to a Prison Ship 1799, Broken up 1815
- Princess Caroline (ex-Dutch, captured 1780) – Scuttled 1799
- Rotterdam 50 (ex-Dutch, captured 1781) – sold 1806
- César 74 (ex-French César, captured 1782) – Blew up 1782
- Hector 74 (1755, ex-French Hector, captured 1782)
- Glorieux 74 (1756, ex-French Glorieux, captured 1782)
- Pegase 74 (1781, ex-French Glorieux, captured 1782) Converted to a Prison Ship 1799, Broken up 1815
- Caton 64 (1777, ex-French Caton, captured 1782) Sold 1815
- Argonaut 64 (1779, ex-French Jason, captured 1782) Broken up 1831
- Solitaire 64 (1774, ex-French Solitaire, captured 1782) Sold 1790

== List of ships-of-the-line of the Royal Navy (1785–1830) ==
=== First rates of 120 guns (three-deckers) ===
- Caledonia class (Rule)
  - Caledonia 120 (1808) – renamed Dreadnought, broken up 1875
  - Britannia 120 (1820) – broken up 1869
  - Prince Regent 120 (1823) – converted to screw, broken up 1873
  - Royal George 120 (1827) – converted to screw, broken up 1875
- Nelson class ('Surveyors' = Rule & Peake)
  - Nelson 120 (1814) – 1859–60 cut down to 91-gun 2-decker and converted to screw, 1867 given to New South Wales Government and fitted as school ship, 1898 sold, 1928 broken up. No sea service as either sail or steam line-of-battle ship.
  - Saint Vincent 120 (1815) – sold 1906
  - Howe 120 (1815) – broken up 1854
- Saint George class – broadened version of Caledonia
  - Saint George 120 (1840) – sold 1883
  - Royal William 120 (1833) – laid down as 120-gun ship. Burnt 1899
  - Neptune 120 (1832) – cut down to 2-decker and converted to 2-decker steam line-of-battle ship 1859, broken up 1875,
  - Waterloo 120 (1833) – cut down to an 89-gun 2-decker and converted to steam in 1859, and was renamed Conqueror in 1862. In 1877, she was renamed Warspite and served as a training ship at Greenhithe/Woolwich. She burned accidentally in 1918.
  - Trafalgar 120 (1841) – laid down as 106-gun ship. Sold 1906

=== First rates of 112 guns (three-deckers) ===
- Wolfe class
  - Wolfe 112 (-) – Laid down 1814, construction suspended in 1815 and cancelled 1831. Destroyed in a storm 1832.
  - Canada 112 (-) – Laid down 1814, construction suspended in 1815. Cancelled in 1831 and broken up.

=== First rates of 110 guns (three-deckers) ===
- Ville de Paris class (Henslow)
  - Ville de Paris 110 (1795) – hulked 1825, broken up 1845.
- Hibernia class (Henslow) – lengthened version of Ville de Paris
  - Hibernia 110 (1804) – sold 1902
- Ocean class (Henslow) – lengthened version of Neptune class Second Rates
  - Ocean 110 (1805) – cut down to 80-gun 2-decker 1821, hulked 1831, coal depot 1852, broken up 1875

=== First rates of 100–104 guns (three-deckers) – later rated as 110 guns ===
- Impregnable class (Rule)
  - Impregnable 104 (1810) – harbour flagship Plymouth 1839, hulked as training ship 1862, renamed Kent 1883, renamed Caledonia 1891, sold 1906
- St. Lawrence class
  - St Lawrence 102 (1814) – laid down 1814. Operated only on Lake Ontario. Decommissioned 1815 and sold 1832.
- Trafalgar class (Rule) – modified Impregnable
  - Trafalgar 100 (1820) – renamed Camperdown 1825, hulked as coal deport Portsmouth 1860, renamed Pitt 1882, sold 1906
- Princess Charlotte class (Rule) – modified Impregnable
  - Princess Charlotte 104 (1825) – hulked as floating barracks Hong Kong 1857, sold 1875
  - Royal Adelaide 104 (1828) – ex-London, 1869 hulked as flag and receiving ship Plymouth, to Chatham 1891, sold 1905

=== Second rates of 98 guns (three-deckers) ===
- Neptune class (Henslow)
  - Dreadnought 98 (1801) – broken up 1857.
  - Neptune 98 (1797) – broken up 1818.
  - Temeraire 98 (1798) – broken up 1838.
- Boyne class – built to the lines of Slade's Victory
  - Boyne 98 (1810) – renamed Excellent 1834, broken up 1861
  - Union 98 (1811) – broken up 1833

=== Second rates of 90/92 guns (two-deckers) ===
- Rodney class (Seppings)
  - Rodney 92 (1833) – converted to screw 1860, broken up 1882
  - Nile 92 (1839) – converted to screw 1854, destroyed by fire 1956
  - London 92 (1840) – converted to screw 1858, sold 1884

=== Second rates of 84 guns (two-deckers) ===
- Formidable class (Seppings) – lines of the Canopus (ex-French Franklin, captured at the Battle of the Nile in 1798), but structurally different; although Canopus was not considered a member of the class, the class are often known as the 'Canopus class'.
  - Formidable 84 (1825) – sold 1906
- Modified Formidable class built in teak in India
  - Ganges 84 (1821) – sold 1929
  - Asia 84 (1824) – flagship at the Battle of Navarino, 1827, sold 1908
  - Bombay 84 (1828) – converted to screw 1861, destroyed by accidental fire 1864
- Further modified Formidable class built in India
  - Calcutta 84 (1831) – sold 1908
- Modified Formidable class
  - Monarch 84 (1832) – broken up 1862–66
  - Vengeance 84 (1824) – sold 1897
  - Thunderer 84 (1831) – sold 1901
  - Powerful 84 (1826) – broken up 1860–64
  - Clarence 84 (1827) – ex-Goliath, accidentally burnt in the Mersey in 1884

=== Third rates of 80 guns (two-deckers) ===
- Foudroyant class (Henslow)
  - Foudroyant 80 (1798) – hulked as gunnery training ship Plymouth 1861, sold to Wheatley Cobb as boys training ship, wrecked on Blackpool Sands while on a fund raising and propaganda tour
- Rochfort class (Barrallier)
  - Rochfort 80 (1814) – broken up 1826
  - Sandwich 80 (-) – ordered 1809, keel laid Dec 1809, cancelled 1811
- Waterloo class (Peake)
  - Waterloo 80 (1818) – renamed Bellerophon 1824, became receiving ship Plymouth, sold 1892
- Cambridge class – lines of Danish Christian VII taken 1807
  - Cambridge 80 (1815) – later classed as 82, hulked as gunnery training ship Plymouth 1856, broken up 1869
- Indus class – enlarged lines of Danish Christian VII taken 1807
  - Indus 80 (1839) – hulked 1860 as harbour flagship Plymouth, sold for breaking 1898
- Hindostan class – enlarged lines of Repulse
  - Hindostan 80 (1841) – hulked 1884 as cadet training ship at Dartmouth, training ship for boy artificers at Portsmouth renamed Fishgard III 1905, sold for breaking up 1921

=== Third rates of 74 guns (two-deckers) ===
- Brunswick class ('Admiralty')
  - Brunswick 74 (1790) – hulked as prison ship Chatham 1812, powder magazine 1814, lazaretto Sheerness 1825, broken up 1826
- Mars class (Henslow)
  - Mars 74 (1794) – hulked as receiving ship Portsmouth 1814, broken up 1819
  - Centaur 74 (1797) – broken up 1819
- Courageux class (Henslow)
  - Courageux 74 (1800) – hulked as lazaretto Chatham 1814, broken up 1832
- Plantagenet class (Rule)
  - Plantagenet 74 (1801) – broken up 1817
- Bulwark class (Rule)
  - Bulwark 74 (1807) – ex-Scipio, broken up 1826
  - Valiant – ordered 1826, but not started
- Ajax class – modified version of 1757 Valiant class
  - Ajax 74 (1798) – accidentally burnt off Tenedos 14 & 15 February 1807
  - Kent 74 (1798) – sheer hulk at Plymouth 1857, broken up 1881
- Conqueror class (Henslow) – modified Mars class
  - Conqueror 74 (1801) – broken up 1822
- Dragon class (Rule)
  - Dragon 74 (1798) – lazaretto at Pembroke 1824, receiving ship and marine barracks 1832, renamed Fame 1842, broken up 1850
- America class – lines of French Impetueux taken 1794
  - Northumberland 74 (1798) – lazaretto at Sheerness 1827, broken up 1850
  - Renown 74 (1798) – hospital ship Plymouth 1814, later to Deptford(?), broken up 1835(?)
- Spencer class (Barralier)
  - Spencer 74 (1800) – broken up 1822
- Achille class – lines of French Pompée taken 1793
  - Achille 74 (1798) – sold for breaking 1865
  - Superb 74 (1798) – broken up 1826
- Revenge class – lines of French Impetueux taken 1794
  - Revenge 74 (1806) – broken up 1840
- Milford class – lines of French Impetueux taken 1794
  - Milford 74 (1806) – lazaretto at Pembroke 1825, broken up 1846
  - Princess Amelia 74 (-) – keel laid 1 January 1799, cancelled March 1800
- Colossus class (Henslow)
  - Colossus 74 (1803) – broken up 1826
  - Warspite 74 (1807) – cut down to 50-gun frigate 1840, hulked 1862 and lent to Marine Society as training ship, accidentally burnt at Woolwich 1876,
- Fame/Hero class (Henslow)
  - Fame 74 (1805) – broken up 1817
  - Albion 74 (1802) – lazaretto Portsmouth 1831, broken up 1836
  - Hero 74 (1803) – wrecked on the Haak Islands 25 December 1811
  - Illustrious 74 (1803) – hulked as ordinary guard ship Plymouth 1848, hospital ship 1853, reverted to ordinary guard ship 1859, broken up 1868
  - Marlborough 74 (1807) – broken up 1835
  - York 74 (1807) – hulked as convict ship Portsmouth 1819, broken up 1835
  - Hannibal 74 (1810) – lazaretto Plymouth 1825, later to Pembroke(?), broken up 1834
  - Sultan 74 (1807) – hulked as receiving ship Portsmouth 1861, target ship 1862, broken up 1864
  - Royal Oak 74 (1809) – hulked as receiving ship Bermuda 1825, broken up 1850
- Modified Carnatic class (derived from prize Courageux, taken from the French 1761)
  - Aboukir 74 (1807) – hulked 1824, sold 1838.
  - Bombay 74 (1808) – renamed Blake 1819, hulked 1823, broken up 1855.
- Swiftsure class (Henslow)
  - Swiftsure 74 (1804) – hulked as receiving ship Portsmouth 1819, broken up 1845
  - Victorious 74 (1808) – hulked as receiving ship Portsmouth 1826, broken up 1861
- Repulse class (Rule) – Talavera structurally different
  - Repulse 74 (1803) – broken up 1820
  - Eagle 74 (1804) – cut down as 50-gun frigate 1831, hulked at Falmouth for the Coastguard 1857, training ship in Southampton Water 1860, to Liverpool 1862, Mersey Division RNVR 1910, renamed Eaglet 1918, burnt 1926, wreck sold for breaking 1927
  - Sceptre 74 (1802) – broken up 1821
  - Magnificent 74 (1806) – hulked as receiving ship Jamaica 1823, sold 1843
  - Valiant 74 (1807) – broken up 1823
  - Elizabeth 74 (1807) – broken up 1820
  - Cumberland 74 (1807) – hulked as convict ship and coal deport Chatham, renamed Fortitude 1833, to Sheerness as coal deport by 1856, sold 1870
  - Venerable 74 (1808) – hulked as church ship Portsmouth, broken up 1838
  - Talavera 74 (1818) – timbered according to Seppings' principle using smaller timbers than usual. Accidentally burnt at Plymouth Oct 1840, then broken up
  - Belleisle 74 (1819) – troopship 1841, hulked as hospital ship Sheerness 1854, lent to the seaman's hospital at Greenwich 1866–68, broken up 1872
  - Malabar 74 (1818) – hulked as coal deport Portsmouth 1848, renamed Myrtle 1883, sold 1905
- Blake class – lengthened Leviathan class
  - Blake 74 (1808) – hulked as temporary prison ship Portsmouth 1814, sold 1816
  - San Domingo 74 (1809) – sold 1816
- Armada or Vengeur class. The most numerous class of British capital ships ever built, with forty vessels being completed to this design (they were popularly known as the "Forty Thieves").
  - Armada 74 (1810) – sold 1863
  - Cressy 74 (1810) – 1827 planned to be converted to 50-gun frigate but instead broken up 1832
  - Vigo 74 (1810) – hulked at receiving ship Plymouth, broken up 1865
  - Vengeur 74 (1810) – hulked as receiving ship 1824, broken up 1843
  - Ajax 74 (1809) – converted to 60-gun screw blockship, 1847, broken up 1864
  - Conquestador 74 (1810) – cut down to 50-gun frigate 1831, hulked War Office powder depot at Purfleet 1856, powder depot Plymouth 1863, sold 1897
  - Poictiers 74 (1809) – broken up 1857
  - Berwick 74 (1809) – broken up 1821
  - Egmont 74 (1810) – hulked as storeship Rio de Janeiro 1863, sold 1875
  - Clarence 74 (1812) – renamed Centurion 1826 and planned to be converted to 50-gun frigate but instead broken up 1828
  - Edinburgh 74 (1811) – converted to 60-gun screw blockship 1852, sold 1866
  - America 74 (1810) – cut down to 50-gun frigate 1835, hulked 1864, broken up 1867
  - Scarborough 74 (1812) – sold 1836
  - Asia 74 (1811) – renamed Alfred, cut down to 50-gun frigate 1828, hulked as gunnery trials ship Portsmouth 1858, broken up 1865
  - Mulgrave 74 (1812) – hulked as a lazaretto Pembroke 1836, powder ship 1844, broken up 1854
  - Anson 74 (1812) – hulked as temporary lazaretto Portsmouth 1831, by 1843 to Chatham and then to Tasmania as a convict ship, broken up 1851
  - Gloucester 74 (1812) – cut down to 50-gun frigate 1835, hulked as receiving ship Chatham 1861, sold 1884
  - Rodney 74 (1809) – renamed Greenwich 1827 and cut down to 50-gun frigate, but conversion probably never completed, sold 1836
  - La Hogue 74 (1811) – converted to 60-gun screw blockship 1848, broken up 1865
  - Dublin 74 (1812) – cut down to 50-gun frigate 1836, laid up 1845, sold 1885
  - Barham 74 (1811) – cut down to 50-gun frigate 1836, broken up 1840
  - Benbow 74 (1813) – hulked as marine barracks Sheerness 1848, prison ship for Russians 1854, coal deport 1859, sold for breaking 1894
  - Stirling Castle 74 (1811) – hulked as convict ship Plymouth 1839, to Portsmouth 1844, broken up 1861
  - Vindictive 74 (1813) – cut down to 50-gun frigate 1833, hulked as depot ship Fernando Po 1862, sold 1871
  - Blenheim 74 (1813) – converted to 60-gun screw blockship 1847, hulked at Portsmouth, broken up 1865
  - Duncan 74 (1811) – hulked as lazaretto Portsmouth 1826, to Sheerness 1831, broken up 1863
  - Rippon 74 (1812) – broken up 1821
  - Medway 74 (1812) – hulked as convict ship Bermuda 1847, sold 1865
  - Cornwall 74 (1812) – cut down to 50-gun frigate 1830, hulked and lent to London School Ship Society as reformatory 1859, to the Tyne as Wellesley hulk 1868, broken up 1875
  - Pembroke 74 (1812) – converted to 60-gun screw blockship 1855, hulked as base ship Chatham 1873, renamed Forte 1890 as receiving hulk, then Pembroke again 1891, sold 1905
  - Indus 74 (1812) – renamed Bellona 1818, hulked as receiving ship Plymouth 1842, broken up 1868
  - Redoubtable 74 (1815) – broken up 1841
  - Devonshire 74 (1812) – hulked and lent to Greenwich Seamen's Hospital as temporary hospital ship 1849, to Sheerness as prison ship for Russians 1854, school ship in Queensborough Swale 1860, broken up 1869
  - Defence 74 (1815) – hulked as convict ship Woolwich 1848, burnt and broken up 1857
  - Hercules 74 (1815) – troopship 1838, emigrant ship 1852, hulked as army depot ship Hong Kong after 1853, sold 1865
  - Agincourt 74 (1817) – hulked as training ship at Plymouth after 1848, renamed Vigo 1865, cholera hospital ship 1866, receiving ship at Plymouth 1870, sold 1884, broken up 1885
  - Pitt 74 (1816) – hulked as coal deport and receiving ship at Plymouth 1853, to Portland 1860, later back to Portsmouth, broken up 1877
  - Wellington 74 (1816) – ex-Hero, hulked as receiving and depot ship Sheerness 1848, to Coastguard Sheerness 1857, to Liverpool Juvenile Reformatory Association Ltd as training ship and renamed Akbar, sold for breaking 1908
  - Russell 74 (1822) – converted to 60-gun screw blockship 1854–55, coastguard ship Sheerness 1858, broken up 1865
  - Akbar 74 (-) – keel laid 4 April 1807, cancelled 12 October 1809. Uncertain whether she was of this class
  - Augusta 74 (-) – laid down in 1806, cancelled 1809.
  - Julius 74 (-) – projected in 1807 but deleted 1812.
  - Orford 74 (-) – projected in 1807 but deleted 1815.
- Cornwallis class – teak-built versions of Armada class
  - Cornwallis 74 (1813) – converted to 60-gun screw blockship 1854–55, hulked as a jetty at Sheerness 1865, renamed Wildfire 1916 as base ship, broken up 1957
  - Wellesley 74 (1815) – hulked as harbour flagship and receiving ship at Chatham 1862, to Purfleet for the London School Ship Society as a reformatory and renamed Cornwall 1868, sunk by the Luftwaffe 1940 (the only ship-of-the-line ever to be sunk in an air attack)
  - Carnatic 74 (1823) – hulked as coal deport Portsmouth 1860, floating magazine for the War Office 1886, returned to the Admiralty 1891, sold 1914
- Black Prince class Note that, while Wellesley belonged officially to this class, plans meant for her construction were lost in 1812 when aboard the Java which was captured by the Americans; so she was actually built to the lines of the Cornwallis (see above).
  - Black Prince 74 (1816) – broken up 1855
  - Melville 74 (1817) – hulked as hospital ship Hong Kong 1857, sold 1873
  - Hawke 74 (1820) – converted to 60-gun screw blockship 1854–55, broken up 1865
- Chatham class – design used captured frames of Franco-Dutch Royal Hollondais
  - Chatham 74 (1812) – sold 1817
- Hastings class – purchased from East India Company in 1819
  - Hastings 74 (1819) – converted to 60-gun screw blockship 1855, Coastguard 1857, coal hulk 1870, sold 1885
- Class uncertain
  - Augusta(?) 74 (-) – keel laid 1806(?), cancelled 1810(?)

=== Third rates of 72 guns (two-deckers) ===
- Imaun class – gift to the RN from the Imam of Muscat 1836
  - Imaun 70 (1826) – hulked at Jamaica as receiving ship 1842, broken up 1862/66

=== Fourth rates of 50 guns (two-deckers) ===
- Antelope class (Henslow)
  - Antelope 50 (1802) – broken up 1845
- Diomede class (Henslow) – probably a variant of Antelope
  - Diomede 50 (1798) – broken up 1815
  - Grampus 50 (1802) – sold 1832
- Jupiter class
  - Jupiter 50 (1813) – broken up 1870
- modified Jupiter class
  - Salisbury 50 (1814) – sold 1837
  - Romney 50 (1815) – sold 1845
  - Isis 50 (1819) – sold 1867

=== Converted East Indiamen ===
==== Third Rates ====
- York – built as Royal Admiral; purchased in 1795 and launched in 1796; wrecked in 1804
- Ardent – built as Princess Royal; purchased in 1795 and launched in 1796; broken up in 1824
- Agincourt – built as Earl Talbot; purchased in 1795 and launched in 1796; decommissioned in 1809; sold and broken up in 1814
- Monmouth – built as Belmont; purchased in 1795 and launched in 1796; hulked in 1815; broken up in 1834
- Lancaster – built as Pigot; purchased in 1795 and launched in 1797; sold and broken up in 1832

==== Fourth Rates ====
- Calcutta – launched in 1788 as Warley; purchased in 1795; captured by France 1805
- Grampus – launched in 1787 as Ceres; purchased in 1795; grounded in 1799 on the Barking shelf near Woolwich through the ignorance of the pilot and abandoned with no loss of life
- Hindostan – launched in 1789 as Hindostan; purchased in 1795; lost in a fire at sea in 1804
- Abergavenny – launched as Earl of Abergavenny in 1789; purchased in 1795; sold 1807
- Malabar – launched as Royal Charlotte in 1789; purchased in 1795; foundered 1796 on a passage from the West Indies with her crew being taken off by the Martha of Whitby
- Glatton – launched as Glatton in 1792; purchased in 1795; scuttled 1830
- Coromandel – built as Winterton; purchased and launched in 1795; sold 1813
- Madras – built as Lascelles; purchased and launched in 1795; sold 1807
- Weymouth – built as Earl Mansfield; purchased and launched in 1795; wrecked, with no loss of life, in 1800 on the Lisbon Bar while going into Lisbon
- Malabar – launched in 1798 as Cuvera; purchased in 1804; renamed Coromandel in 1815; broken up in 1853
- Hindostan – launched 1798 as Admiral Rainier; purchased in 1804; renamed Dolphin in 1819; renamed Justitia in 1831; sold 1855

=== Captures of the Revolutionary War ===
==== French ships ====
- Commerce de Marseille 120 (1788) – ex-French, captured 29 August 1793, prison ship by 1800, sold 1802
- Pompée 74 (1791) – ex-French, captured 29 August 1793, broken up 1817
- Juste 80 (1784) – ex-French, captured Glorious First of June in 1794, broken up 1811
- Ça Ira 80 (1784) – ex-French, captured Glorious First of June in 1794, Burnt by accident 11 April 1896.
- Sans Pareil 80 (1793) – ex-French, captured Glorious First of June in 1794, sheer hulk 1810, broken up 1842
- Impétueux 74 (1788) – ex-French America, captured Glorious First of June in 1794, broken up 1813
- Tigre 74 (1793) – ex-French, captured 23 June 1795, broken up 1817
- Belleisle 74 (1788) – ex-French Formidable, captured 23 June 1795, fought at Trafalgar, broken up 1814
- Hercule 74 (1797) – ex-French, captured 20 April 1798, deleted 1810
- Canopus 80 (1797) – ex-French Franklin, captured 1 August 1798, harbour service 1863, sold 1887
- Tonnant 80 (1789) – ex-French captured 1 August 1798, broken up 1821
- Spartiate 74 (1794) – ex-French Spartiate, sheer hulk 1842, broken up 1857
- Donegal 76 (1794) – ex-French Hoche captured 12 October 1798, broken up 1845
- Guerrier 74 (1754) – ex-French Guerrière, captured 2 August 1798, broken up 1810.
- Genereux (1785) 74 (1785) – ex-French, captured 18 February 1800, prison ship 1805, broken up 1816
- Malta (1795) 80 (1795) – ex-French Guillaume Tell, captured 30 March 1800, harbour service 1831, broken up 1840
- Athenienne (1800) 64 (1800) – ex-French Athenien ex-Maltese, captured 30 August 1800, wrecked 1806

==== Dutch ships ====
- Overyssel 64 – captured 22 October 1795, hulk 1810, sold 1882
- Zealand 64 – captured 19 January 1796, harbour service 1803, sold 1830

===== Captured at the Capitulation of Saldanha Bay, 17 August 1796 =====
- Van Tromp 54 – ex-Dutch M.H. Tromp
- Dortrecht 62 – ex-Dutch Dordrecht, harbour service 1804, sold 1823
- Prince Frederick 64 – ex-Dutch Revolutie and Prins Frederik, hospital ship by 1804, sold 1817

===== Captured at the Battle of Camperdown, 11 October 1797 =====
- Vryheid 70 – prison ship 1798, powder hulk 1802, sold 1811.
- Camperdown 70 – ex-Dutch Jupiter, prison ship 1798, powder hulk 1802, sold 1817.
- Gelykheid 64/68 – guardship 1803, sheer hulk 1807, disposed of in 1814.
- Admiral De Vries 64 – harbour service 1800, sold 1806
- Haarlem 64 – harbour service 1811, sold 1816
- Wassenaar 66 – ex-Dutch Wassenaar, hulk 1804, sold 1818
- Delft 50 – sunk 15 October 1797 (four days after the battle) off the coast at The Hague, while making for Britain as a prize.
- Delft 68 – ex-Dutch Hercules, hospital ship by 1804, sold 1817 Renamed to honour the crew of the ship Delft 50 above

===== Captured at the Vlieter Incident, 30 August 1799 =====
- Princess of Orange 74 – ex-Dutch Washington, harbour service 1806, sold 1822.
- Leyden 64 – floating battery 1805, sold 1815
- Texel 64 – ex-Dutch Cerberus, sold 1818

===== Captured Dutch fourth-rate two-deckers =====
- Brakel (c. 1784), captured at the Capitulation of Saldanha Bay in 1796, sold 1814
- Tromp (c. 1779), captured at the Capitulation of Saldanha Bay in 1796, sold 1815
- Alkmaar (c. 1783), captured at the Battle of Camperdown (1797), sold 1815
- Broederschap (c. 1769), captured at the Vlieter Incident (1799), renamed Broaderscarp, broken up 1805
- Batavier (c. 1779), captured at the Vlieter Incident (1799), broken up 1823
- Beschermer (c. 1784), captured at the Vlieter Incident (1799), sold 1838

Note the six Dutch ships above were 54-gun ships, so the British Navy as classed them as Fourth rate two-deckers, and not as ships of the line.

==== Spanish ships ====
- San Nicolas 80 (1769) – ex-Spanish, captured Battle of Cape St Vincent (1797), prison ship 1798, sold 1814.
- San Josef 110 (1783) – ex-Spanish, captured Battle of Cape St Vincent (1797), training ship by 1837, broken up 1849
- San Antonio 74 (1785) – sold to become French Saint Antoine (1801), captured at the Battle of Algeciras Bay in 1801, prison ship 1807, sold 1828

=== Captures of the Napoleonic Wars ===
- French 80-gun ships of Le Tonnant class:
  - Brave 80 – ex-French Le Formidable, captured 1805, broken up 1816
  - Alexandre – ex-French Alexandre, captured 1806, sold 1822
- French 74-gun ships of Le Téméraire class:
  - Duquesne 74 (1788) – ex-French Le Duquesne, captured 25 July 1803, stranded 1804, broken up 1805
  - Implacable 74 (1800) – ex-French Le Duguay-Trouin, captured 4 November 1805, training ship 1805, scuttled 1949
  - Mont Blanc 74 (1791) – ex-French Mont Blanc, captured 4 November 1805, hulk 1811, sold 1819
  - Scipion 74 (1801) – ex-French Le Scipion, captured 4 November 1805, broken up 1819
  - Brave 74 (1795) – ex-French Le Brave, captured 6 February 1806, foundered 1806
  - Maida 74 (1795) – ex-French Le Jupiter, captured 6 February 1806), sold 1814
  - Marengo 74 (1795) – ex-French Le Marengo, captured 1806, broken up 1816
  - Abercrombie 74 (1807) – ex-French D'Hautpoul, captured 7 September 1809, sold 1817
  - Genoa (ex-French Le Brillant, captured 1814 on stocks) – broken up 1838
- French 74-gun ship of Le Pluton class:
  - Rivoli 74 (1810) – ex-French Le Rivoli, captured 22 February 1812, broken up 1819
- Spanish 74-gun ship of San Juan Nepomuceno class:
  - San Juan 74 – ex-Spanish San Juan Nepomuceno, captured 21 October 1805, hulked 1805

==== Danish ship captured at the Battle of Copenhagen (1801) ====
- HMS Holstein – renamed Nassau in 1805; sold 1814.

==== Danish ships captured at the Battle of Copenhagen (1807) ====
- Christian VII 80 (1803) – harbour service 1809, broken up 1838
- Dannemark 74 (?) – sold 1815
- Norge 74 (?)– sold 1816
- Princess Carolina 74 (?) – sold 1815

== List of ships-of-the-line of the Royal Navy (1830–47) ==
Captain Sir William Symonds served as Surveyor of the Navy from 1832 to 1847. Captain Symonds was a naval officer and yacht designer, "who had risen to prominence by his success in competitive sailing trials between small warships. His selection implied a criticism of the dockyard-trained architects of the preceding 200 years". Symonds attempted a revolution in warship design. His ships were designed to be faster under sail, and have more room for the gunners to work the guns (improving ergonomics). To achieve this, his ships were larger, and used a different hull form to provide stability without needing large amounts of ballast. Unfortunately the Surveyor's department was understaffed for the amount of work they were undertaking, and mistakes were made. Symonds' designs had more stability than was desirable, with the result that they rolled excessively and therefore were poor gun platforms. Another problem with Symonds' ships was that they were very sensitive to the distribution of weights on board ship, such as the stores carried and consumed on a voyage.

Symonds worked very closely with John Edye, an experienced and well-educated shipwright officer. Edye was responsible for the details of structure and construction. The ships that Symonds and Edye designed had far more iron in their structure than the previous generation of ships designed by Seppings.

=== First rates of 120 guns (three-deckers) ===
- Royal Albert class (Lang) 3-decker, 120 guns
  - Royal Albert 120 (1854) – laid down 1844, converted to screw 1852–54
- Duke of Wellington class (Surveyors Department) improved Queen, 3-deckers, 120 guns
  - Windsor Castle 120 (1852) – laid down 1849, converted to screw 131-guns 1852, renamed Duke of Wellington
  - Marlborough 120 (1855) – laid down 1850, converted to screw 131-guns 1853–55
  - Royal Sovereign 120 (1857) – laid down 1849, converted to screw 1855–57
  - Prince of Wales 120 (1860) – laid down 1848, converted to screw 1856–60

=== First rates of 110 guns (three-deckers) ===
- Queen class (Symonds & Edye) 3-decker 110 guns
  - Queen 116 (1839) – ex-Royal Frederick, laid down 1833, converted to screw 2-decker 1858–59
  - Victoria 116 (1858) – laid down 1844, renamed Windsor Castle 1855, converted to screw 1857–58
  - Frederick William 116 (1860) – ex-Royal Frederick, laid down 1841, converted to screw 2-decker 1859–60
  - Algiers – ordered 1833, but not begun, cancelled 11 December 1834.
  - Royal Sovereign – ordered 1832, probably not begun, cancelled 1838.

=== Second rates of 90 guns (two-deckers) ===
- Albion class (Symonds & Edye)
  - Albion 90 (1842) – laid down 1839. A design error led to the main deck in Albion being unusually low. converted to screw 1860-1
  - Aboukir 91 (1848) – laid down 1840, converted to screw 1856–58
  - Exmouth 91 (1854) – laid down 1841, converted to screw 1853–54
  - Saint Jean D'Acre – ordered 1844 but not begun, cancelled 1845
  - Hannibal – ordered 1839, probably not begun, cancelled 1846
- Princess Royal class (Edye) modified Albion class
  - Princess Royal 91 (1853) – laid down 1841, converted to screw 1853
  - Hannibal 91 (1854) – laid down 1848, converted to screw 1854
- Algiers class (Edye or Committee of Reference) modified Albion class
  - Algiers 91 (1854) – laid down 1848, converted to screw 1852–54
- Caesar class (Committee of Reference) modified Rodney class
  - Caesar 91 (1853) – laid down 1848, converted to screw 1852–53

=== Second rates of 80 guns (two-deckers) ===
- Vanguard class (Symonds & Edye)
  - Vanguard 78 (1835) – laid down 1833, broken up 1875
  - Goliath 80 (1842) – laid down 1834, converted to screw 1856–57
  - Superb 80 (1842) – laid down 1838, lent as accommodation ship for Turkish naval crews of ships building on the Thames 1864, by 1866 returned to ordinary reserve, broken up 1869
  - Meeanee 60 (1848) – ex-Madras, laid down 1841, converted to screw 1852–53
  - Collingwood 80 (1841) – laid down 1835, converted to screw 1860–61
  - Centurion 80 (1844) – laid down 1839, converted to screw 1854–55
  - Mars 80 (1848) – laid down 18395, converted to screw 1855–56
  - Lion 80 (1847) – laid down 1840, converted to screw 1858–59
  - Majestic 80 (1853) – laid down 1841, converted to screw 1852–53
  - Colossus 80 (1848) – laid down 1843, converted to screw 1854–55
  - Irresistible 80 (1859) – laid down 1849, converted to screw 1855–59
- Modified Vanguard class (Admiralty alteration of Symonds & Edye design)
  - Brunswick 80 (1855) – laid down 1847, converted to screw 1854–55
- Orion class (Edye & Watts)
  - Orion 80 (1854) – laid down 1850, converted to screw 91-guns 1852–54
  - Hood 80 (1859) – laid down 1849, converted to screw 91-guns 1856–59
  - Edgar 80 (-) never laid down
- Sans Pareil class – lines of ex-French Sans Pareil captured in 1795, though structurally different
  - Sans Pareil 80 (1851) – laid down 1845, converted to screw 70-guns 1849–51

=== Third rates of 70 guns (two-deckers) ===
- Boscawen class (Symonds & Edye)
  - Boscawen 70 (1844) – built from frames originally made for another ship, drill ship at Southampton 1862, to the Tyne as a hulk 1874 and renamed Wellesley, burnt and broken up 1914
  - Cumberland 70 (1842) – laid down 1836, sheer hulk at Sheerness 1863, training ship in the Clyde for the Clyde Industrial Training Ship Association 1869, destroyed by fire 1889

== List of unarmoured steam ships-of-the-line of the Royal Navy (1847–61) ==
Ships have been listed by class as in Lambert.

=== Ships converted to steam ships-of-the-line ===
- Duke of Wellington class 3-deckers, 131 guns
  - Duke of Wellington 131 (1852) – ex-Windsor Castle, laid down 1849, converted to screw 1852, receiving ship Portsmouth 1863, sold 1902 for broken up
  - Marlborough 131 (1855) – laid down 1850, converted to screw 1853–55, receiving ship Portsmouth 1878, renamed Vernon II 1904, sold 1924, capsized off Brighton while on tow to the breakers Oct 1924
  - Royal Sovereign 121 (1857) – laid down 1849, converted to screw 1855–57, converted to turret ship 1864, sold for breaking 1885
  - Prince of Wales 121 (1860) – laid down 1848, converted to screw 1856–60, renamed Britannia to replace original ship of that name as training ship for boys in the river Dart 1869, hulked 1909, sold for breaking 1914
- Royal Albert class (Lang) 3-decker, 121 guns
  - Royal Albert 121 (1854) – laid down 1844, converted to screw 1852–54, sold 1883 for broken up
- Windsor Castle class 3-decker, 102 guns, laid down as Queen class 116 guns
  - Windsor Castle 102 (1858) – ex-Victoria, laid down 1844, converted to screw 1857–58, no sea-service, renamed Cambridge and hulked as gunnery training ship Devonport 1869, sold 1908
- Orion class 2-deckers, 91 guns, laid down as 80 gun ships
  - Orion 91 (1854) – broken up 1867
  - Hood 91 (1859) – sold 1888/1904
  - Edgar 80 (-) – never laid down
- Caesar class 2-decker, 91 guns
  - Caesar 91 (1853) – sold 1870
- Algiers class 2-decker, 91 guns, improved Albion class
  - Algiers 91 (1854) – sold 1870
- Princess Royal class 2-deckers, 91 guns, laid down as Albion class
  - Princess Royal 91 (1853) – sold 1872
  - Hannibal 91 (1854) – sold 1904
- Rodney class 2-deckers, 91 guns
  - Rodney 91 (1833) – converted to screw 1860, broken up 1882
  - Nile 91 (1839) – converted to screw 1854, burnt 1956
  - London 91 (1840) – converted to screw 1858, sold 1884
- Nelson class 2-decker, 91 guns, originally Nelson class 3-decker 120 guns
  - Nelson 91 (1814) – laid down as 120-gunner. Converted to steam and cut down to 2-decker 1859–60. Fitted as schoolship for New South Wales 1867. Sold 1898. Broken up 1928. No service as sail or steam line-of-battle ship
- Royal George class 2-deckers, 89 guns, originally Caledonia class 3-decker 120 guns
  - Prince Regent 89 (1823) – cut down to 92-gun 2-decker 1841–47, converted to screw 1860–61, broken up 1873
  - Royal George 89 (1827) – converted to steam 120-gun 3-decker 1852–53, poop and forecastle removed December 1854, making her 102-gun 3-decker, cut down to 89-gun 2-decker 1860, sold 1875
- Saint George class 2-deckers, 89 guns, originally broadened Caledonia class 3-decker 120 guns
  - St George 89 (1840) – sold 1883
  - Royal William 89 (1833) – burnt 1899
  - Neptune 89 (1827) – sold 1875
  - Waterloo 120 (1833) – converted 1859, renamed Conqueror 1862, renamed Warspite 1877 and served as a training ship at Greenhithe/Woolwich. Burnt 1918.
  - Trafalgar 91 (1841) – sold 1906
- Albion class 2-deckers, 91 guns, originally Albion class 2-deckers 90 guns
  - Albion 91 (1842) – conversion to screw begun 1861, never completed; broken up 1884
  - Aboukir 91 (1848) – sold 1878
  - Exmouth 91 (1854) – sold 1905
- Queen class 2-deckers, 86 guns, originally Queen class 3-decker 120 guns
  - Queen 86 (1839) – converted to screw 2-decker 1858–59, broken up 1871
  - Frederick William 86 (1860) – converted to screw 2-decker 1859–60, renamed Worcester 1876 and became training ship at Greenhithe for the Thames Marine Officers Training Society, sold 1948, foundered 1948, raised and broken up 1953
- Cressy class 2-decker, 80 guns
  - Cressy 80 (1853) – sold 1867
- Majestic class 2-deckers, 80 guns, originally Vanguard class 2-deckers 80 guns
  - Goliath 80 (1842) – converted to screw 1857, burnt 1875
  - Collingwood 80 (1841) – converted to screw 1861, sold 1867
  - Centurion 80 (1844) – converted to screw 1855/56, sold 1870
  - Mars 80 (1848) – converted to screw 1855, sold 1929
  - Lion 80 (1847) – converted to screw 1859, sold 1905
  - Majestic 80 (1853) – broken up 1868
  - Meeanee 80 (1848) – laid down as Madras 80. Converted to screw 1857, broken up 1906
  - Colossus 80 (1848) – converted to screw 1854, sold 1867
  - Brunswick 80 (1855) – sold 1867
  - Irresistible 80 (1859) – sold 1894
- Bombay class 2-decker, 80 guns, ex-Canopus class
  - Bombay 84 (1828) – converted to screw 1861, burnt 1864
- Sans Pareil class 2-decker, 80 guns
  - Sans Pareil 80 (1851) – completed as 70-gun screw warship, sold 1867
- Blenheim class 2-deckers, 60 guns blockships, ex-74s
  - Ajax 60 (1809) – ex-74, converted to 60-gun screw blockship, 1847, broken up 1864
  - Blenheim 60 (1813) – ex-74, converted to 60-gun screw blockship 1847, hulked at Portsmouth, broken up 1865
  - Edinburgh 60 (1811) – ex-74, converted to 60-gun screw blockship 1852, sold 1866
  - Hogue 60 (1811) – ex-74, converted to 60-gun screw blockship 1848, broken up 1865
- Cornwallis class 2-deckers, 60 guns blockships, ex-74s
  - Cornwallis 60 (1813) – ex-74, converted to 60-gun screw blockship 1854–55, hulked as a jetty at Sheerness 1865, renamed Wildfire 1916 as base ship, broken up 1957
  - Hastings 60 (1819) – ex-74, purchased from East India Company in 1819, converted to 60-gun screw blockship 1855, Coastguard 1857, coal hulk 1870, sold 1885
  - Hawke 60 (1820) – ex-74, converted to 60-gun screw blockship 1854–55, broken up 1865
  - Pembroke 60 (1812) – ex-74, converted to 60-gun screw blockship 1855, hulked as base ship Chatham 1873, renamed Forte 1890 as receiving hulk, then Pembroke again 1891, sold 1905
  - Russell 60 (1822) – ex-74, converted to 60-gun screw blockship 1854–55, coastguard ship Sheerness 1858, broken up 1865

=== Wooden-hulled ships built (or at least laid down) as steam ships-of-the-line ===
- Victoria class, 3-deckers, 121 guns
  - Victoria 121 (1859) – sold 1892
  - Howe 110 (1860) – renamed Impregnable. sold 1921
- Saint Jean D'Acre class 2-decker, 101 guns
  - St Jean d'Acre 101 (1853) – sold 1875
- Conqueror class 2-deckers, 101 guns
  - Conqueror 101 (1855) – wrecked 1861
  - Donegal 101 (1858) – renamed Vernon 1886, sold 1925
- Duncan class 2-deckers, 101 guns
  - Duncan 101 (1859) – sold 1910
  - Gibraltar 101 (1860) – renamed Grampian 1888, sold 1899
- Agamemnon class 2-decker, 91 guns
  - Agamemnon 91 (1852) – sold 1870
- James Watt class 2-deckers, 91 guns
  - James Watt 91 (1853) – sold 1875
  - Victor Emmanuel 91 (1855) – ex-Repulse. sold 1899
  - Edgar 91 (1858) - sold 1904
  - Hero 91 (1858) – sold 1871
- Renown class 2-deckers, 91 guns
  - Revenge 91 (1859) – broken up 1923
  - Renown 91 (1857) – sold 1870
  - Atlas 91 (1860) – broken up 1904
  - Anson 91 (1860) – broken up 1904
- Defiance class 2-decker, 91 guns
  - Defiance 91 (1861) – sold 1931
- Bulwark class 2-deckers, 91 guns
  - Bulwark 91 (-) – suspended almost complete 1861, broken up 1873
  - Robust 91 (-) – laid down as Duncan class, suspended almost complete 1861, broken up 1872
  - Repulse – ordered to be converted to ironclad 1866
  - Zealous – ordered to be converted to ironclad 1864
  - Royal Alfred – ordered to be converted to ironclad 1861
  - Royal Oak – ordered to be converted to Prince Consort-class ironclad as half-sister of Prince Consort class 1861
  - Triumph – ordered to be converted to Prince Consort-class ironclad 1861 and completed as Prince Consort
  - Caledonia – ordered to be converted to Prince Consort-class ironclad 1861
  - Ocean – ordered to be converted to Prince Consort-class ironclad 1861
  - Blake – ordered but never laid down. Cancelled 1863.
  - Kent – ordered but never laid down. Cancelled 1863.
  - Pitt – ordered but never laid down. Cancelled 1863.

== List of ironclad warships of the Royal Navy (1860–82) ==
=== Sea-going ironclads (1860–82) ===
- Warrior-class broadside ironclads
  - Warrior (1860) – preserved Portsmouth
  - Black Prince (1861) – renamed Emerald 1903, renamed Impregnable III 1910, sold for breaking 1923
- Defence-class broadside ironclads
  - Defence (1861)
  - Resistance (1861)
- Hector-class broadside ironclads
  - Hector (1862)
  - Valiant (1863)
- Achilles (1863) broadside ironclad
- Minotaur-class broadside ironclads
  - Minotaur (1863)
  - Agincourt (1865)
  - Northumberland (1866)
- Prince Consort-class broadside ironclads (converted from Bulwark-class 2-deckers)
  - Prince Consort (1862) (ex-Triumph)
  - Caledonia (1862)
  - Ocean (1862)
- Royal Oak (1862) – broadside ironclad (converted from Bulwark-class 2-decker)
- Royal Alfred (1864) – central-battery ironclad (converted from Bulwark-class 2-decker)
- Research (1863) – central-battery ironclad
- Enterprise (1864) – central-battery ironclad
- Favorite (1864) – central-battery ironclad
- Zealous (1864) – central-battery ironclad (converted from Bulwark-class 2-decker)
- Repulse (1868) – central-battery ironclad (converted from Bulwark-class 2-decker)
- Lord Clyde-class broadside ironclads
  - Lord Clyde (1864)
  - Lord Warden (1865)
- Pallas (1865) – central-battery ironclad
- Bellerophon (1865) – central-battery ironclad
- Penelope (1867) – central-battery ironclad
- Hercules (1868) – central-battery ironclad – sold for breaking 1932
- Monarch (1868) – masted turret-ship
- Captain class – masted turret-ship
  - Captain (1869) – sank 1870
- Audacious-class central-battery ironclads
  - Audacious (1869)
  - Invincible (1869)
  - Iron Duke (1870)
  - Vanguard (1870)
- Swiftsure-class central-battery ironclads
  - Swiftsure (1870) – sold for breaking 1908
  - Triumph (1870) – sold for breaking 1921
- Sultan (1870) – central-battery ironclad
- Devastation class – mastless turret-ship
  - Devastation (1871) – sold for break up 1908
  - Thunderer (1872) – mastless turret-ship, sold for breaking 1909
- Alexandra (1875) – central-battery ironclad, sold for breaking 1908
- Temeraire (1876) – central-battery ironclad with barbettes
- Superb class (intended for Ottoman Empire) – central-battery ironclads
  - Superb (1875) – launched as Hamidieh, renamed
  - (Ottoman Messudieh)
- Neptune (1874) (ex-Independencia) – masted turret-ship, sold for breaking 1903
- Dreadnought (1875) – mastless turret-ship, sold for breaking 1908
- Inflexible (1876) – central citadel turret-ship, sold for breaking 1903
- Ajax-class central citadel turret-ships
  - Agamemnon (1879) – broken up 1903
  - Ajax (1880) – sold for breaking 1904

=== Coastal service ironclads ===
- Royal Sovereign (1862) – turret-ship, converted from Duke of Wellington-class 3-decker
- Prince Albert (1864) – turret-ship
- Scorpion-class masted turret-ships
  - Scorpion (1863)
  - Wivern (1863)
- Cerberus-class turret-ships
  - Cerberus (1868) (Victoria)
  - Magdala (1870) (India)
- Abyssinia (1870) (India) – turret-ship
- Glatton (1871) – turret-ship
- Hotspur (1870) – turret-ship
- Rupert (1872) – turret-ship, sold for breaking 1907
- Belleisle-class (intended for Ottoman Empire) central battery ships
  - Belleisle (1876) – launched as Peki-Shereef, renamed
  - Orion (1879) – planned name Boordhi-Zaffer
- Conqueror-class turret-ships
  - Conqueror (1881) – sold for breaking 1907
  - Hero (1885)

== See also ==
- Bibliography of 18th-19th century Royal Naval history
