= HMS Rochester (1693) =

Ship of the line of the Royal Navy

History

Great Britain
- Name: HMS Rochester
- Ordered: 28 June 1692
- Builder: Robert Lee, Chatham Dockyard
- Launched: 15 March 1693
- Renamed: HMS Maidstone, 1744
- Fate: Broken up, 1748

General characteristics as built
- Class & type: 50-gun fourth rate ship of the line
- Tons burthen: 607 32/94 bm
- Length: 125 ft 5 in (38.2 m) (gundeck) 107 ft (32.6 m) (keel)
- Beam: 32 ft 8 in (10.0 m)
- Depth of hold: 13 ft 6 in (4.1 m)
- Propulsion: Sails
- Sail plan: Full-rigged ship
- Armament: 50 guns of various weights of shot

General characteristics after 1716 rebuild
- Class & type: 1706 Establishment 50-gun fourth rate ship of the line
- Tons burthen: 719 34/94 bm
- Length: 131 ft 3 in (40.0 m) (gundeck) 108 ft 7 in (33.1 m) (keel
- Beam: 35 ft 3.5 in (10.8 m)
- Depth of hold: 14 ft (4.3 m)
- Propulsion: Sails
- Sail plan: Full-rigged ship
- Armament: 50 guns: Gundeck: 22 × 18 pdrs; Upper gundeck: 22 × 9 pdrs; Quarterdeck: 4 × 6 pdrs; Forecastle: 2 × 6 pdrs

HMS Rochester was a 50-gun fourth rate ship of the line of the Royal Navy, and the fifth such ship to be ordered in 1692 (following the Falmouth, Portland, Anglesea, and Dartmouth). She was launched at Chatham Dockyard on 15 March 1693.

She was docked on 30 July 1714 at Deptford Dockyard for rebuilding, and was rebuilt to the 1706 Establishment there and re-launched on 19 March 1716. On 27 September 1744 she was renamed HMS Maidstone, and converted for use as a hospital ship. The Maidstone was broken up at Woolwich Dockyard in 1748.
