= HMS Norwich (1693) =

Ship of the line of the Royal Navy

History

Great Britain
- Name: HMS Norwich
- Ordered: 5 August 1692 (contracted)
- Builder: Robert & John Castle, Deptford
- Launched: 24 August 1693
- Renamed: HMS Enterprise, 1744
- Fate: Broken up, 1771

General characteristics as built
- Class & type: 50-gun fourth rate ship of the line
- Tons burthen: 618 1/94 bm
- Length: 123 ft 8 in (37.7 m) (gundeck) 101 ft 6 in (30.9 m) (keel)
- Beam: 33 ft 10 in (10.3 m)
- Depth of hold: 13 ft 6.5 in (4.1 m)
- Propulsion: Sails
- Sail plan: Full-rigged ship
- Armament: 50 guns of various weights of shot

General characteristics after 1718 rebuild
- Class & type: 1706 Establishment 50-gun fourth rate ship of the line
- Tons burthen: 703 bm
- Length: 130 ft (39.6 m) (gundeck)
- Beam: 35 ft (10.7 m)
- Depth of hold: 14 ft (4.3 m)
- Propulsion: Sails
- Sail plan: Full-rigged ship
- Armament: 50 guns: Gundeck: 22 × 18 pdrs; Upper gundeck: 22 × 9 pdrs; Quarterdeck: 4 × 6 pdrs; Forecastle: 2 × 6 pdrs

HMS Norwich was a 50-gun fourth rate ship of the line of the Royal Navy, launched at Deptford (a commercial yard, not the Royal Dockyard) on 24 August 1693. The last of seven 50-gun ships ordered during 1692, she was given the name of Norwich following the loss of the previous 50-gun ship of that name (which had been launched in 1691) on 6 October 1692.

She arrived at Chatham Dockyard on 15 October 1712 to be rebuilt according to the 1706 Establishment, relaunching on 20 May 1718. In 1744 she was reduced to a 44-gun fifth rate and renamed HMS Enterprise on 23 May 1744.

== Engagements ==
HMS Norwich took part in the destruction of the fortress of San Lorenzo el Real Chagres (22–24 March 1740), in Panama, as part of a squadron commanded by Vice-Admiral Edward Vernon during the War of Jenkins' Ear.

At 3 pm on 22 March 1740, the English squadron, composed of the ships Strafford, Norwich, Falmouth and Princess Louisa, the frigate Diamond, the bomb vessels Alderney, Terrible and Cumberland, the fireships Success and Eleanor, and transports Goodly and Pompey, under Vernon's command, began to bombard the Spanish fortress. Given the overwhelming superiority of the English forces, Captain Don Juan Carlos Gutiérrez Cevallos surrendered the fort on 24 March, after resisting for two days. In 1743 as part of a squadron commanded by Commodore Charles Knowles participated in the failed attacks to La Guayra and Puerto Cabello.

On 23 May 1744 she was renamed as HMS Enterprise and reduced to 44-guns. She patrolled the Caribbean until the end of the War of the Spanish Succession in 1748, when she was laid up in ordinary.

Enterprise was recommissioned in 1756 at the outbreak of the Seven Years' War, again for service in the West Indies and North America and resumed her duties as Atlantic convoy escort. In 1762 she was present at the siege and capture of Havana, Cuba, an action involving nearly 60 warships and transports enough for more than 16,000 troops.

Enterprise was decommissioned in January 1764 and was broken up in 1771 at Sheerness.

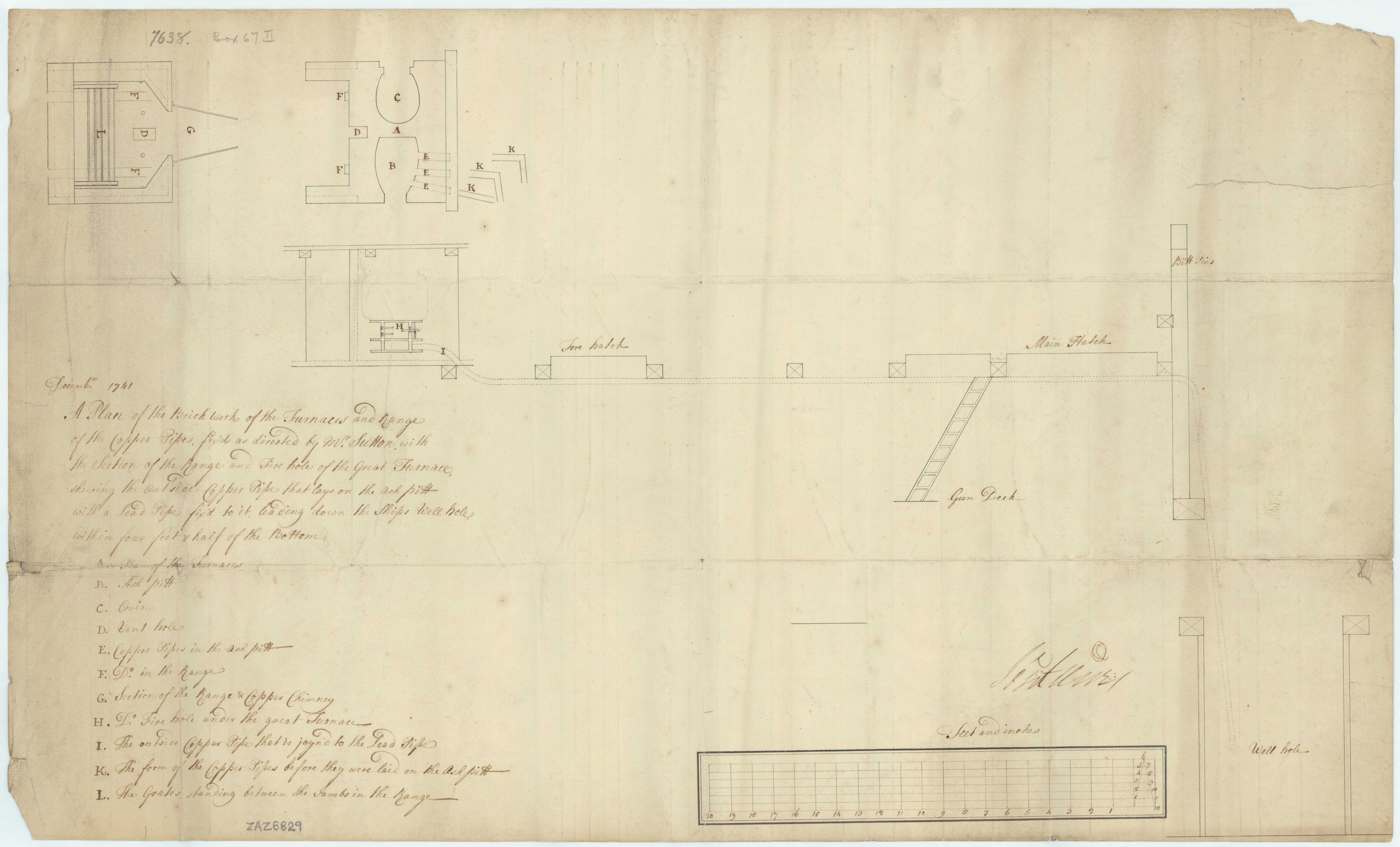
Plan of a furnace for the 1718 rebuild
