= HMS Norfolk (1693) =

Ship of the line of the Royal Navy

History

Great Britain
- Name: HMS Norfolk
- Ordered: 21 December 1691 (contract)
- Builder: John Winter, Southampton
- Launched: 28 March 1693
- Commissioned: 1693
- Renamed: HMS Princess Amelia, 1755
- Fate: Broken up, 1757
- Notes: Participated in: Battle of Vélez-Málaga

General characteristics as built
- Class & type: 80-gun third rate ship of the line
- Tons burthen: 1184 22/94 bm
- Length: 156 ft 6 in (47.7 m) (gundeck); 129 ft 3.25 in (39.4 m) (keel)
- Beam: 41 ft 6 in (12.6 m)
- Depth of hold: 17 ft 4 in (5.3 m)
- Propulsion: Sails
- Sail plan: Full-rigged ship
- Complement: 476
- Armament: 80 guns of various weights of shot

General characteristics after 1728 rebuild
- Class & type: 1719 Establishment 80-gun third rate ship of the line
- Tons burthen: 1393 5/94 bm
- Length: 158 ft 0 in (48.2 m) (gundeck); 128 ft 2 in (39.1 m) (keel)
- Beam: 45 ft 2.5 in (13.8 m) (as built)
- Propulsion: Sails
- Sail plan: Full-rigged ship
- Complement: 520
- Armament: 80 guns: Gundeck: 26 × 32 pdrs; Middle gundeck: 26 × 12 pdrs; Upper gundeck: 24 × 6 pdrs; Quarterdeck: 4 × 6 pdrs

HMS Norfolk was an 80-gun third rate ship of the line of the Royal Navy. She was built at Southampton and launched on 28 March 1693, and was the first ship to bear the name. She was rebuilt at Plymouth according to the 1719 Establishment, and was re-launched on 21 September 1728. Instead of carrying her armament on two decks as she had done originally, she now carried them on three gundecks, though she continued to be rated a third rate.

She gained her first battle honour at Vélez-Málaga in 1704. The ship conducted a number of important duties throughout her long career. She was then employed in the role of Plymouth guardship, before being attached to the Mediterranean Fleet and then to the West Indies, as reinforcement for that region, as well as performing as flagship of Rear-Admiral Sir John Balchen.

The Norfolk was rebuilt at Plymouth Dockyard from 1718 to 1728 to the dimensions of the 1719 Establishment. She was not fitted out until 1731, when she was recommissioned under Captain John Roberta. Her final action was near France in 1744. Norfolk was renamed Princess Amelia in 1755, two years after the previous Princess Amelia had been broken up. She herself was broken up in 1757.
