= Ruby Group =

Class overview
- Name: Ruby Group
- Builders: Deptford Dockyard
- Operators: Kingdom of England; Royal Navy
- Preceded by: 1651 Programme Group
- Succeeded by: Early 1652 Programme
- Built: 1651–1652
- In service: 1651–1709
- Completed: 2
- Retired: 2

General characteristics
- Type: 42-gun Fourth Rate
- Tons burthen: 500 0/94 tons bm
- Sail plan: ship-rigged
- Complement: 180/150 in 1652
- Armament: 42 guns

The Ruby Group of two 600 ton Fourth Rate vessels were part of the 1651 Programme. They were the two larger vessels. Initially five vessels were specified, three of 410 tons at 6.10.0d (Note: The cost accounting for inflation of approximately £1,100 in reference to today) per ton and two of 600 tons at £7.10.0d (Note: The cost accounting for inflation of approximately £1,200 in reference to today) per ton. The size of these vessels grew from the 1647 predecessors with 600 tonners being much broader. The two 600-ton vessels would be completed as 42-gun Fourth Rates.

== Design and specifications ==
The construction one vessels was assigned to Portsmouth Dockyard with one vessel contracted to Peter Pett I of Ratcliffe. The dimensional data was so varied that it will be listed on the individual vessels along with their gun armament composition.

== Ships of the 1651 Programme Group ==
Name	Builder	Launch date	Remarks
Ruby (1652)	Deptford Dockyard	15 March 1652	Rebuilt at Blackwall 1687
Diamond (1652)	Deptford Dockyard	15 March 1652	Captured by the French on 20 September 1693
