= HMS Albemarle (1680) =

Ship of the line of the Royal Navy

History

Great Britain
- Name: HMS Albemarle
- Builder: Betts, Harwich
- Launched: 29 October 1680
- Renamed: HMS Union, 1704
- Fate: Broken up, 1749

General characteristics as built
- Class & type: 90-gun second rate ship of the line
- Tons burthen: 1395 bm
- Length: 162 ft (49.4 m) (gundeck)
- Beam: 44 ft 4 in (13.5 m)
- Depth of hold: 19 ft 7.5 in (6.0 m)
- Propulsion: Sails
- Sail plan: Full-rigged ship
- Armament: 90 guns of various weights of shot

General characteristics after 1704 rebuild
- Class & type: 90-gun second rate ship of the line
- Tons burthen: 1557 bm
- Length: 163 ft 6 in (49.8 m) (gundeck)
- Beam: 45 ft (13.7 m)
- Depth of hold: 18 ft 4 in (5.6 m)
- Propulsion: Sails
- Sail plan: Full-rigged ship
- Armament: 90 guns of various weights of shot

General characteristics after 1726 rebuild
- Class & type: 1719 Establishment 90-gun second rate ship of the line
- Tons burthen: 1578 bm
- Length: 164 ft (50.0 m) (gundeck)
- Beam: 47 ft 2 in (14.4 m)
- Depth of hold: 18 ft 10 in (5.7 m)
- Propulsion: Sails
- Sail plan: Full-rigged ship
- Armament: 90 guns: Gundeck: 26 × 32-pounders; Middle gundeck: 26 × 18-pounders; Upper gundeck: 26 × 9-pounders; Quarterdeck: 10 × 6-pounders; Forecastle: 2 × 6-pounders

HMS Albemarle was a 90-gun second rate ship of the line of the Royal Navy, launched and commissioned on 29 October 1680 at Harwich.

During the Nine Years' War, HMS Albemarle took part in the Battle of Beachy Head in 1690 and the Battle of Barfleur in 1692.

She was rebuilt in 1704 at Chatham Dockyard, remaining a 90-gun second rater. She was also renamed HMS Union at this time. She underwent a second rebuild at Chatham, from where she was relaunched on 8 February 1726 as a 90-gun second rater built to the 1719 Establishment.

Union was broken up in 1749.
