= HMS St Albans (1706) =

Ship of the line of the Royal Navy

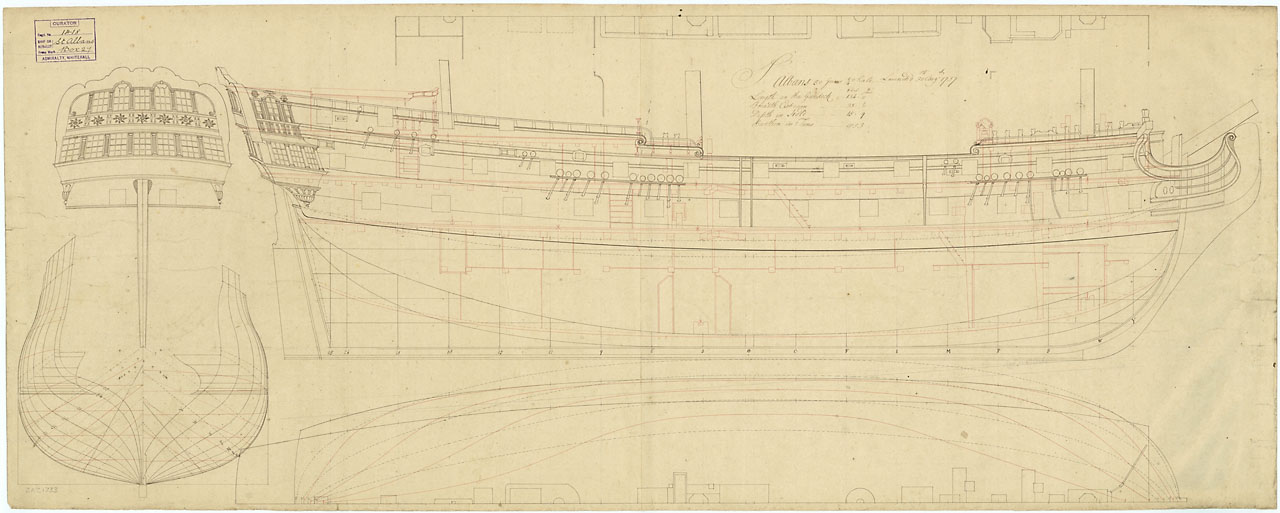
- Saint Albans, plans of the 1737 rebuild

History

Great Britain
- Name: HMS St Albans
- Builder: Burchett, Rotherhithe
- Launched: 10 December 1706
- Fate: Wrecked, 1744

General characteristics as built
- Class & type: 50-gun fourth rate ship of the line
- Tons burthen: 687 bm
- Length: 130 ft 8 in (39.8 m) (gundeck)
- Beam: 34 ft 4 in (10.5 m)
- Depth of hold: 13 ft 7 1/2 in (4.2 m)
- Propulsion: Sails
- Sail plan: Full-rigged ship
- Armament: 50 guns of various weights of shot

General characteristics after 1718 rebuild
- Class & type: 1706 Establishment 50-gun fourth rate ship of the line
- Length: 130 ft (39.6 m) (gundeck)
- Beam: 35 ft (10.7 m)
- Depth of hold: 14 ft (4.3 m)
- Propulsion: Sails
- Sail plan: Full-rigged ship
- Armament: 50 guns: Gundeck: 22 × 18-pdrs; Upper gundeck: 22 × 9-pdrs; Quarterdeck: 4 × 6-pdrs; Forecastle: 2 × 6-pdrs

General characteristics after 1737 rebuild
- Class & type: 1733 proposals 50-gun fourth rate ship of the line
- Tons burthen: 853 bm
- Length: 134 ft (40.8 m) (gundeck)
- Beam: 38 ft 6 in (11.7 m)
- Depth of hold: 15 ft 9 in (4.8 m)
- Propulsion: Sails
- Sail plan: Full-rigged ship
- Armament: 50 guns: Gundeck: 22 × 18-pdrs; Upper gundeck: 22 × 9-pdrs; Quarterdeck: 4 × 6-pdrs; Forecastle: 2 × 6-pdrs

HMS St Albans was a 50-gun fourth rate ship of the line of the Royal Navy, built at Rotherhithe and launched on 10 December 1706.

St Albans underwent her first rebuild at Plymouth Dockyard, where she was reconstructed to the dimensions laid out in the 1706 Establishment, and relaunched on 6 March 1718. On 10 September 1734 orders were issued for her to be taken to pieces and rebuilt for a second time at Plymouth, though on this occasion according to the 1733 proposals of the 1719 Establishment. She was relaunched on 30 August 1737.

St Albans was wrecked in 1744.
