= HMS Medway (1693) =

Ship of the line of the Royal Navy

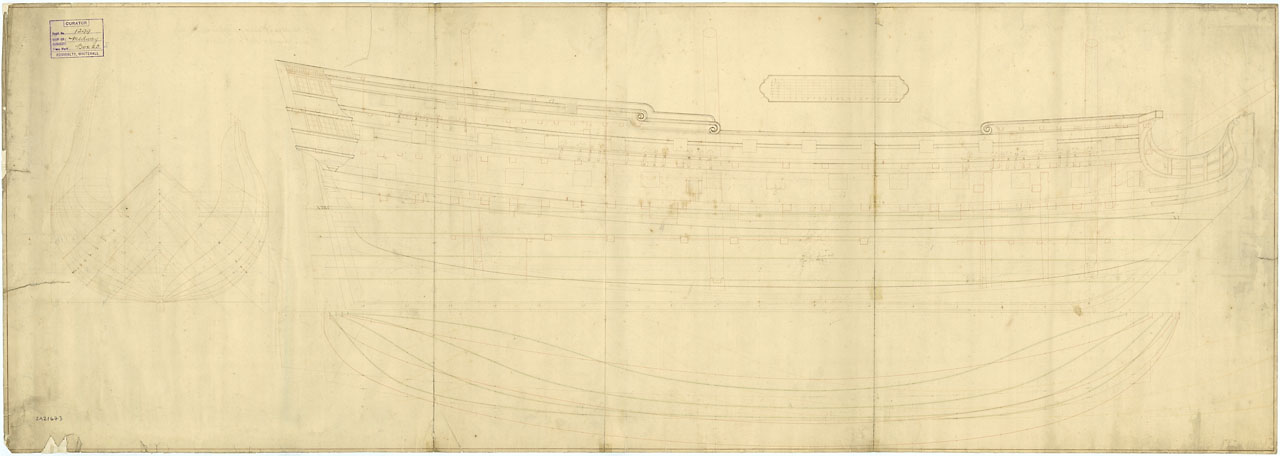
- Medway plan of the 1718 rebuild

History

Great Britain
- Name: HMS Medway
- Builder: Furzer, Sheerness Dockyard
- Launched: 20 September 1693
- Fate: Broken up, 1749

General characteristics as built
- Class & type: 60-gun fourth rate ship of the line
- Tons burthen: 914 bm
- Length: 145 ft 3 in (44.3 m) (gundeck)
- Beam: 38 ft (11.6 m)
- Depth of hold: 15 ft 7 in (4.7 m)
- Propulsion: Sails
- Sail plan: Full-rigged ship
- Armament: 60 guns of various weights of shot

General characteristics after 1718 rebuild
- Class & type: 1706 Establishment 60-gun fourth rate ship of the line
- Tons burthen: 914 bm
- Length: 144 ft (43.9 m) (gundeck)
- Beam: 38 ft (11.6 m)
- Depth of hold: 15 ft 8 in (4.8 m)
- Propulsion: Sails
- Sail plan: Full-rigged ship
- Armament: 60 guns: Gundeck: 24 × 24 pdrs; Upper gundeck: 26 × 9 pdrs; Quarterdeck: 8 × 6 pdrs; Forecastle: 2 × 6 pdrs

HMS Medway was a 60-gun fourth rate ship of the line of the Royal Navy, launched at Sheerness Dockyard on 20 September 1693.

Medway, together with Chatham and Triton, captured the French Auguste on 19 August 1705.

She was rebuilt according to the 1706 Establishment at Deptford Dockyard, and relaunched on 1 August 1718. Medway was hulked in 1740.

She was eventually broken up in 1749.
