= Temple-class ship of the line =

Class overview
- Name: Temple
- Operators: Royal Navy
- In service: 1759 - 1762
- Completed: 2
- Lost: 2

General characteristics
- Type: 68-gun third rate ship of the line
- Tons burthen: 1422 bm
- Length: 160 ft 0 in (48.8 m) (gundeck); 132 ft 0 in (40.2 m) (keel)
- Beam: 45 ft 0 in (13.7 m)
- Depth of hold: 19 ft 4 in (5.9 m)
- Sail plan: Full-rigged ship
- Complement: 520 officers and men
- Armament: 68 guns: Gundeck: 26 × 32 pdrs; Upper gundeck: 28 × 18 pdrs; Quarterdeck: 12 × 9 pdrs; Forecastle: 2 × 9 pdrs

The Temple class ships were two 68-gun third rates designed for the Royal Navy to the lines of the Vanguard of 1748, i.e. to the outdated 1745 Establishment. The Temple class ships were the last 68-gun ships to be built - both by commercial contract - to the draught specified by that specification.

== Design and development ==
The Temple class were the final 68-gun ships built to the 1745 Establishment. They measured 160 feet (48.8 m) on the gundeck and 132 feet 10 inches (40.5 m) on the keel. They had a beam of 45 feet 1 inch (13.7 m) and a depth of hold of 19 feet 4 inches (5.9 m). The ship had a tonnage of 1,422 tons burthen. The armament of the ships consisted of twenty six 32-pounder guns on the main gun deck and eighteen 18-pounder guns on the gun deck above that. On their forecastle, they mounted two 9-pounder guns, with twelve more mounted on the quarterdeck. Their crew numbered 520 officers and ratings. They were equipped with a full ship rig.

== Ships ==
Construction data
Ship	Builder	Ordered	Laid down	Launched	Completed	Fate
HMS Temple	Hugh Blaydes, Hull	9 September 1756	17 November 1755	3 November 1758	11 March 1759	Foundered off Cape Clear, 18 December 1762
HMS Conqueror	John Barnard & John Turner, Harwich	11 January 1757	9 February 1757	24 May 1758	3 February 1759 at Harwich, then 15 March 1759 at Portsmouth	Wrecked in Plymouth Sound, 26 October 1760
