= HMS Salisbury (1707) =

Ship of the line of the Royal Navy

History

Great Britain
- Name: HMS Salisbury
- Builder: Rosewell, Chatham Dockyard
- Launched: 3 July 1707
- Fate: Sold, 1749

General characteristics as built
- Class & type: 1706 Establishment 50-gun fourth rate ship of the line
- Tons burthen: 703 bm
- Length: 130 ft (39.6 m) (gundeck)
- Beam: 35 ft (10.7 m)
- Depth of hold: 14 ft (4.3 m)
- Propulsion: Sails
- Sail plan: Full-rigged ship
- Armament: 50 guns: Gundeck: 22 × 18-pdrs; Upper gundeck: 22 × 9-pdrs; Quarterdeck: 4 × 6-pdrs; Forecastle: 2 × 6-pdrs

General characteristics after 1717 rebuild
- Class & type: 1706 Establishment 50-gun fourth rate ship of the line
- Tons burthen: 710 bm
- Length: 130 ft (39.6 m) (gundeck)
- Beam: 35 ft (10.7 m)
- Depth of hold: 14 ft (4.3 m)
- Propulsion: Sails
- Sail plan: Full-rigged ship
- Armament: 50 guns: Gundeck: 22 × 18-pdrs; Upper gundeck: 22 × 9-pdrs; Quarterdeck: 4 × 6-pdrs; Forecastle: 2 × 6-pdrs

General characteristics after 1726 rebuild
- Class & type: 1719 Establishment 50-gun fourth rate ship of the line
- Tons burthen: 756 bm
- Length: 134 ft (40.8 m) (gundeck)
- Beam: 36 ft (11.0 m)
- Depth of hold: 15 ft 2 in (4.6 m)
- Propulsion: Sails
- Sail plan: Full-rigged ship
- Armament: 50 guns: Gundeck: 22 × 18-pdrs; Upper gundeck: 22 × 9-pdrs; Quarterdeck: 4 × 6-pdrs; Forecastle: 2 × 6-pdrs

HMS Salisbury was a 50-gun fourth rate ship of the line of the Royal Navy, built at Chatham Dockyard to the dimensions of the 1706 Establishment, and launched on 3 July 1707. In autumn of 1707, she brought the body of admiral Sir Cloudesley Shovell (who had been killed in a disastrous shipwreck in the Isles of Scilly) from St Mary's to Plymouth prior to his burial in Westminster Abbey.

Salisbury was rebuilt for the first time by Stacey of Woolwich Dockyard. Unusually, as she was undergoing her rebuild just 10 years after her original launch, she was reconstructed to the same design specifications, and was relaunched on 10 October 1717. Salisbury was the only ship to have been built twice to the same design. She was ordered to be taken to pieces for her second rebuild in orders dated 9 April 1725, and was rebuilt at Portsmouth to the 1719 Establishment. Salisbury was relaunched on 30 October 1726.

Salisbury was engaged in an action during August 1711, attempting to intercept the homeward-bound Spanish plate fleet, which was expected to arrive at the port of Cartagena, Colombia from Portobelo. The Salisbury formed part of a group of five two-deckers and a sloop under Commodore James Littleton. The British fleet arrived on 6 August chasing five large vessels, but these were able to enter the harbour via the Bocachica entrance. The next morning, another four vessels were chased, and Captain Francis Hosier in the Salisbury, assisted by the Heureux, a French prize previously captured by the Salisbury, engaged the Spanish vice-flagship until Littleton could come up, and the Spaniard later submitted. A further Spanish vessel surrendered to Edward Vernon in the sixty-gun Jersey. The British continued to patrol the environs of Cartagena until forced to abandon the blockade several weeks later, allowing the Spanish vessels to proceed to Havana unhindered.

Salisbury was converted to a hulk in 1744, and was sold out of the navy in 1749.
