= HMS Anglesea (1694) =

Ship of the line of the Royal Navy

History

Great Britain
- Name: HMS Anglesea
- Ordered: 17 February 1693
- Builder: Flint, Plymouth Dockyard
- Launched: 17 April 1694

General characteristics as built
- Class & type: 50-gun fourth rate ship of the line
- Tons burthen: 620 21/94 bm
- Length: 125 ft (38.1 m) (on gundeck) 106 ft (32.3 m) (keel)
- Beam: 33 ft 2 in (10.1 m)
- Depth of hold: 14 ft (4.3 m)
- Propulsion: Sails
- Sail plan: Full-rigged ship
- Armament: 50 guns of various weights of shot

General characteristics after 1725 rebuild
- Propulsion: Sails
- Sail plan: Full-rigged ship

HMS Anglesea (referred to as HMS Anglesey on occasion) was a 50-gun fourth rate ship of the line of the Royal Navy, launched at Plymouth in 1694, although not ordered from the dockyard, but as a commercial contract with Mr Flint, with labour and materials supplied from the dockyard by the Master Shipwright, Elias Waffe. She was ordered on 17 February 1692 (the same day as her sister Portland, which was built at Woolwich Dockyard).

Anglesea, under the command of Captain James Litteton between 1698 and 1701, was one of four ships sent to Madagascar on an anti-piracy mission under Thomas Warren in 1699.

Anglesea was reduced to a 40-gun fifth rate in 1719, and underwent a rebuild from then until 1725 at Chatham Dockyard.
