= HMS Portland (1693) =

Ship of the line of the Royal Navy

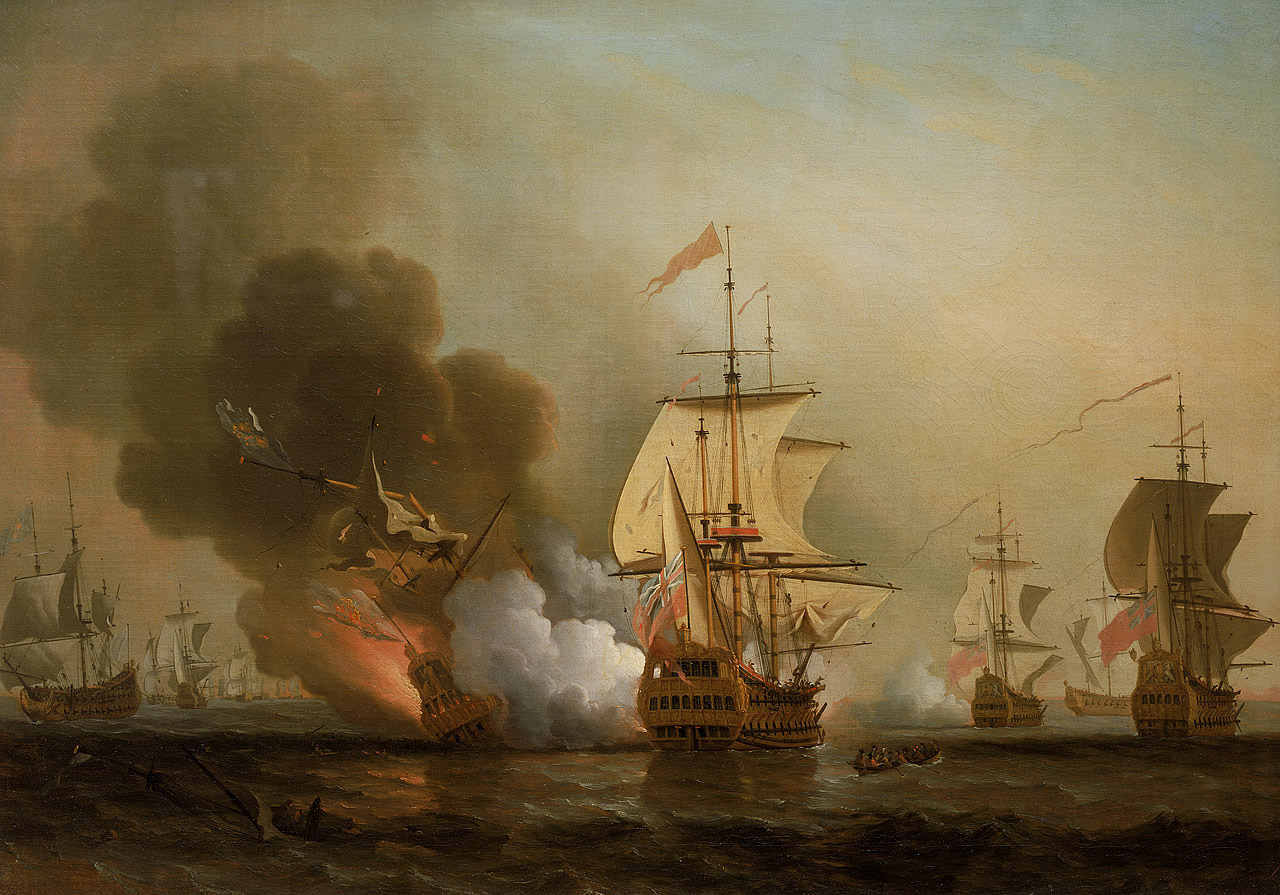
- Portland at Wager's Action

History

Great Britain
- Name: HMS Portland
- Ordered: 17 February 1692
- Builder: Joseph Lawrence, Woolwich Dockyard
- Launched: 28 March 1693
- Fate: Broken up, 1743

General characteristics as built
- Class & type: 50-gun fourth rate ship of the line
- Tons burthen: 636 39/94 bm
- Length: 125 ft 6 in (38.3 m) (gundeck) 103 ft 6 in (31.5 m) (keel)
- Beam: 34 ft (10.4 m)
- Depth of hold: 14 ft (4.3 m)
- Propulsion: Sails
- Sail plan: Full-rigged ship
- Armament: 50 guns of various weights of shot

General characteristics after 1723 rebuild
- Class & type: 1719 Establishment 50-gun fourth rate ship of the line
- Tons burthen: 772
- Length: 134 ft (40.8 m) (gundeck)
- Beam: 36 ft (11.0 m)
- Depth of hold: 15 ft 2 in (4.6 m)
- Propulsion: Sails
- Sail plan: Full-rigged ship
- Armament: 50 guns: Gundeck: 22 × 18 pdrs; Upper gundeck: 22 × 9 pdrs; Quarterdeck: 4 × 6 pdrs; Forecastle: 2 × 6 pdrs

HMS Portland was a 50-gun fourth rate ship of the line of the Royal Navy, launched at Woolwich Dockyard on 28 March 1693. One of two 50-gun ships ordered on 17 February 1692 (the other was the Anglesea).

She was present at Wager's Action a naval confrontation on 8 June 1708 N.S (28 May O.S.), between a British squadron under Charles Wager and the Spanish treasure fleet, as part of the War of Spanish Succession.

On 17 March 1709, Portland recaptured Coventry, which the 54-gun Auguste and the 54-gun Jason (1704) had captured in September 1704.

She was rebuilt according to the 1719 Establishment at Portsmouth, and was re-launched on 25 February 1723.

In July 1739 Edward Hawke, who later became the First Lord of the Admiralty, became the commander of Portland until 1743.

Portland was broken up later that same year.
