= HMS Humber (1693) =

Ship of the line of the Royal Navy

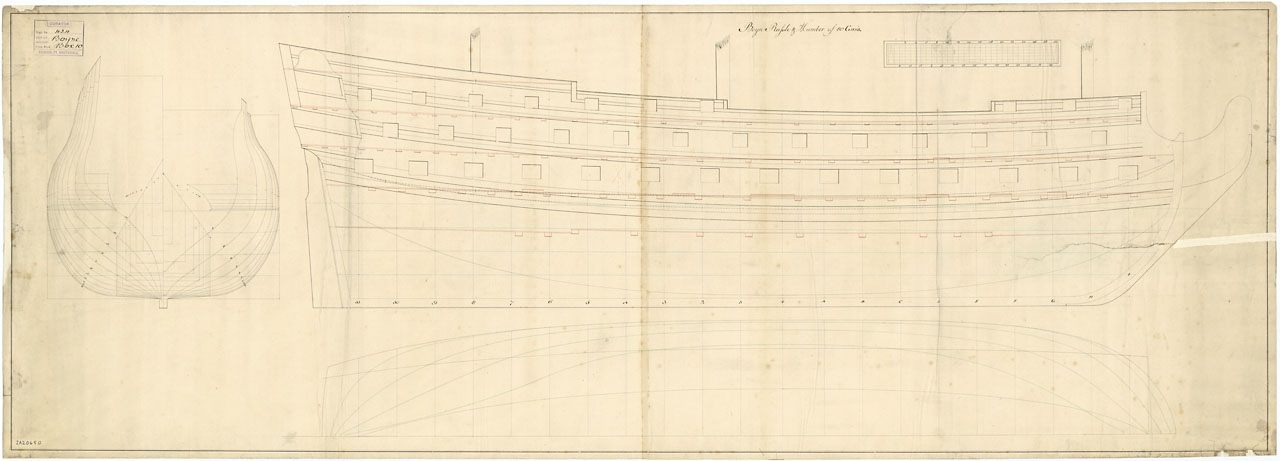
- Humber (1708 plan)

History

Great Britain
- Name: HMS Humber
- Builder: Frame, Hull
- Launched: 30 March 1693
- Renamed: HMS Princess Amelia, 1726
- Fate: Broken up, 1752

General characteristics as built
- Class & type: 80-gun third rate ship of the line
- Tons burthen: 1,223
- Length: 156 ft 3 in (47.6 m) (gundeck)
- Beam: 42 ft 1.5 in (12.8 m)
- Depth of hold: 17 ft 4 in (5.3 m)
- Propulsion: Sails
- Sail plan: Full-rigged ship
- Armament: 80 guns of various weights of shot

General characteristics after 1708 rebuild
- Class & type: 1706 Establishment 80-gun third rate ship of the line
- Tons burthen: 1,294
- Length: 156 ft (47.5 m) (gundeck)
- Beam: 43 ft 6 in (13.3 m)
- Depth of hold: 17 ft 8 in (5.4 m)
- Propulsion: Sails
- Sail plan: Full-rigged ship
- Armament: 80 guns: Gundeck: 26 × 32 pdrs; Middle gundeck: 26 × 12 pdrs; Upper gundeck: 24 × 6 pdrs; Quarterdeck: 4 × 6 pdrs

General characteristics after 1726 rebuild
- Class & type: 1719 Establishment 80-gun third rate ship of the line
- Tons burthen: 1,352
- Length: 158 ft (48.2 m) (gundeck)
- Beam: 44 ft 6 in (13.6 m)
- Depth of hold: 18 ft 2 in (5.5 m)
- Propulsion: Sails
- Sail plan: Full-rigged ship
- Armament: 80 guns: Gundeck: 26 × 32 pdrs; Middle gundeck: 26 × 12 pdrs; Upper gundeck: 24 × 6 pdrs; Quarterdeck: 4 × 6 pdrs

HMS Humber was an 80-gun third rate ship of the line of the Royal Navy, launched at Hull on 30 March 1693.

She was rebuilt according to the 1706 Establishment at Deptford in 1708. Her guns, previously being mounted on two gundecks, were now mounted on three, though she remained classified as a third rate. On 30 October 1723 Humber was ordered to be taken to pieces and rebuilt to the 1719 Establishment at Portsmouth. She was renamed HMS Princess Amelia, and relaunched on 4 October 1726.

Princess Amelia was broken up in 1752.
