= HMS Falmouth (1708) =

Ship of the line of the Royal Navy

History

Great Britain
- Name: Falmouth
- Ordered: 8 February 1707
- Builder: Stacey, Woolwich Dockyard
- Launched: 26 February 1708
- Fate: Broken up, 1747

General characteristics (as built)
- Class & type: 1706 Establishment 50-gun fourth-rate ship of the line
- Tons burthen: 70045/94 (bm)
- Length: 130 ft (39.6 m) (gundeck)
- Beam: 35 ft 1 in (10.7 m)
- Depth of hold: 14 ft (4.3 m)
- Sail plan: Full-rigged ship
- Complement: 195–280
- Armament: 50 guns: Gundeck: 22 × 18-pounder guns; Upper gundeck: 22 × 9-pounder guns; Quarterdeck: 4 × 6-pounder guns; Forecastle: 2 × 6-pounder guns

General characteristics (after 1729 rebuild)
- Class & type: 1719 Establishment 50-gun fourth-rate ship of the line
- Tons burthen: 760 bm
- Length: 134 ft (40.8 m) (gundeck)
- Beam: 36 ft (11.0 m)
- Depth of hold: 15 ft 2 in (4.6 m)
- Sail plan: Full-rigged ship
- Armament: 50 guns: Gundeck: 22 × 18-pounder guns; Upper gundeck: 22 × 9-pounder guns; Quarterdeck: 4 × 6-pounder guns; Forecastle: 2 × 6-pounder guns

HMS Falmouth was a 50-gun fourth-rate ship of the line built for the Royal Navy in the first decade of the 18th century. The ship participated in several battles during the War of the Spanish Succession (1701–15) and the War of Jenkins' Ear (1739–48).

== Description ==
Falmouth had a length at the gundeck of 130 feet (39.6 m) and 107 feet (32.6 m) at the keel. She had a beam of 35 feet 1 inch (10.7 m) and a depth of hold of 14 feet (4.3 m). The ship's tonnage was 700 45/94 tons burthen. Officially rated at 50 guns, her armament consisted of 22 twelve-pounder guns on the lower gundeck and 22 six-pounder guns on the upper deck. On the quarterdeck were 8 six-pounder guns with another pair on the forecastle. The ship had a crew of 185–280 officers and ratings.

When rebuilt in 1724, Falmouth had a length at the gundeck of 134 feet 2 inches (40.9 m) and 109 feet (33.2 m) at the keel. She had a beam of 36 feet 1 inch (11.0 m) and a depth of hold of 15 feet 2 inches (4.6 m). The ship's tonnage was 760 61/94 tons burthen. Her armament was upgraded and now consisted of 22 eighteen-pounder guns on the lower gundeck and 22 nine-pounder guns on the upper deck. The number of six-pounder guns on the quarterdeck was reduced to four, but the pair on the forecastle were retained. The ship now had a crew of 280 officers and ratings.

== Construction and career ==
Falmouth was the third ship in the Royal Navy to be named after the eponymous port. Built to the 1706 Establishment design, the ship was ordered on 8 February 1707. She was built at Woolwich Dockyard under the direction of Master Shipwright Richard Stacey, and was launched on 26 February 1708

On 14 May 1724 Falmouth was ordered to be taken to pieces and rebuilt according to the 1719 Establishment at Woolwich Dockyard, from where she was relaunched on 3 April 1729.
