= HMS Royal Alfred =

Royal Navy ironclad frigate

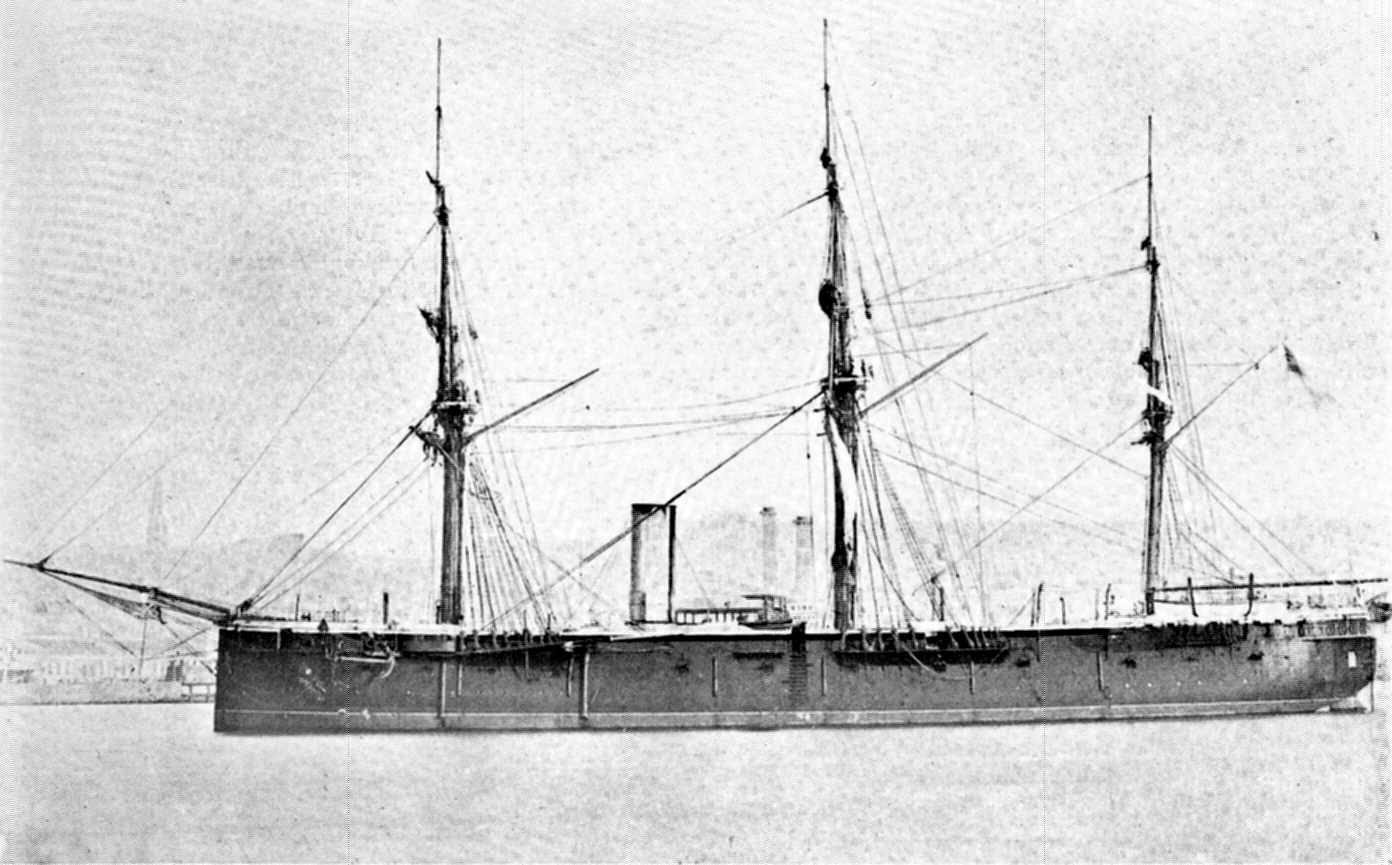
- At Plymouth in 1867

History

United Kingdom
- Name: HMS Royal Alfred
- Builder: Portsmouth Dockyard
- Laid down: 1 December 1859
- Launched: 15 October 1864
- Completed: 23 March 1867
- Commissioned: January 1867
- Fate: Broken up, 1885

General characteristics
- Class & type: Bulwark class battleship
- Displacement: 6,707 long tons (6,815 t)
- Length: 273 ft (83 m)
- Beam: 58 ft 6 in (17.83 m)
- Draught: 23 ft 9 in (7.24 m) light; 27 ft (8.2 m) deep load
- Propulsion: Maudsley horizontal reciprocating; 3,230 ihp (2,409 kW)
- Sail plan: Ship-rigged; sail area 29,200 sq ft (2,700 m^{2})
- Speed: 12.36 knots (14.22 mph; 22.89 km/h) under power; 12.3 kn (14.2 mph; 22.8 km/h) under sail
- Complement: 605 plus Admiral's staff
- Armament: 10 × 9-inch (229 mm) muzzle-loading rifles; 8 × 7 in (180 mm) muzzle-loading rifles; 6 × 20-pounder saluting smoothbore
- Armour: Belt: 6 in (150 mm) amidships and 4 in (100 mm) fore and aft; Battery: 6 in (150 mm); Bulkheads: 4.5 in (110 mm)

HMS Royal Alfred was a central-battery ironclad frigate of the Victorian era, serving with the Royal Navy. She was half-sister to HMS Zealous and HMS Repulse.

== Background and design ==
In 1861, in response to the French warship building programme initiated by Emperor Napoleon III, the British Board of Admiralty selected seven wooden two-decked second-rate warships currently under construction for conversion to armoured warships. The first four, which were converted with all possible speed, were completed as HMS Royal Oak and the Prince Consort-class ships, HMS Prince Consort, HMS Caledonia and HMS Ocean.

The last three were intentionally delayed until assessment could be made of the first four, and as a result of this assessment Royal Alfred, Zealous and Repulse were completed on different lines to the earlier ships, and, indeed to each other.

In the 1860s rapid changes were taking place in the technology of armament production, and calibres were increasing by about an inch per year. It was therefore distinctly possible that a ship designed to carry a specific armament fit would be already outclassed on completion by other ships already on the stocks, at home or abroad, designed for the next generation of gun. As a battleship normally took not less than three years to progress from laying-down to launch, and as at that time warship gun designs were being upgraded approximately annually, this was a real and serious problem. With this in mind, completion of Royal Alfred was delayed until a suitable heavy gun became available. Her armament was placed amidships in a "box battery", an enclosure armoured on all four sides, with the guns places as close together as possible while allowing for their efficient working. Lighter guns were placed outside the box, near the bow and the stern, to provide fore and aft fire. Unlike many Victorian warships, she carried the same ordnance throughout her active career. She was the last wooden-hulled battleship to be built at Portsmouth.

== Service history ==
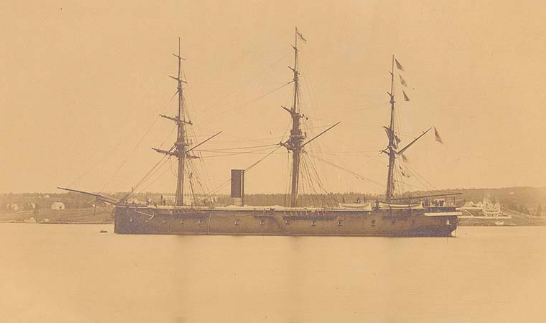
"HMS Royal Alfred, Halifax Harbour, NS", ca1870

She was commissioned in January 1867 as flagship on the North America station; she arrived at Halifax, Nova Scotia, after steaming through a major North Atlantic gale, with only one day's coal supply in her bunkers. She remained on this station for six years, moving between Nova Scotia and the West Indies, broken only by a short relief by HMS Defence for docking. On 21 March 1872, she ran aground in the Bahama Channel. Repairs cost £952. Two of her officers were reprimanded at the subsequent Court Martial. She returned to pay off in January 1874, and was in Portland reserve until the following year. An engineering survey discovered that her boilers were so corroded that she could achieve a steam pressure of only 10 pound/sq. inch and a speed of 7.5 knots (13.9 km/h). She was forthwith laid up until sold in 1885 to Henry Castle & Sons.
