= Prince Consort-class ironclad =

1860s class of British ironclads

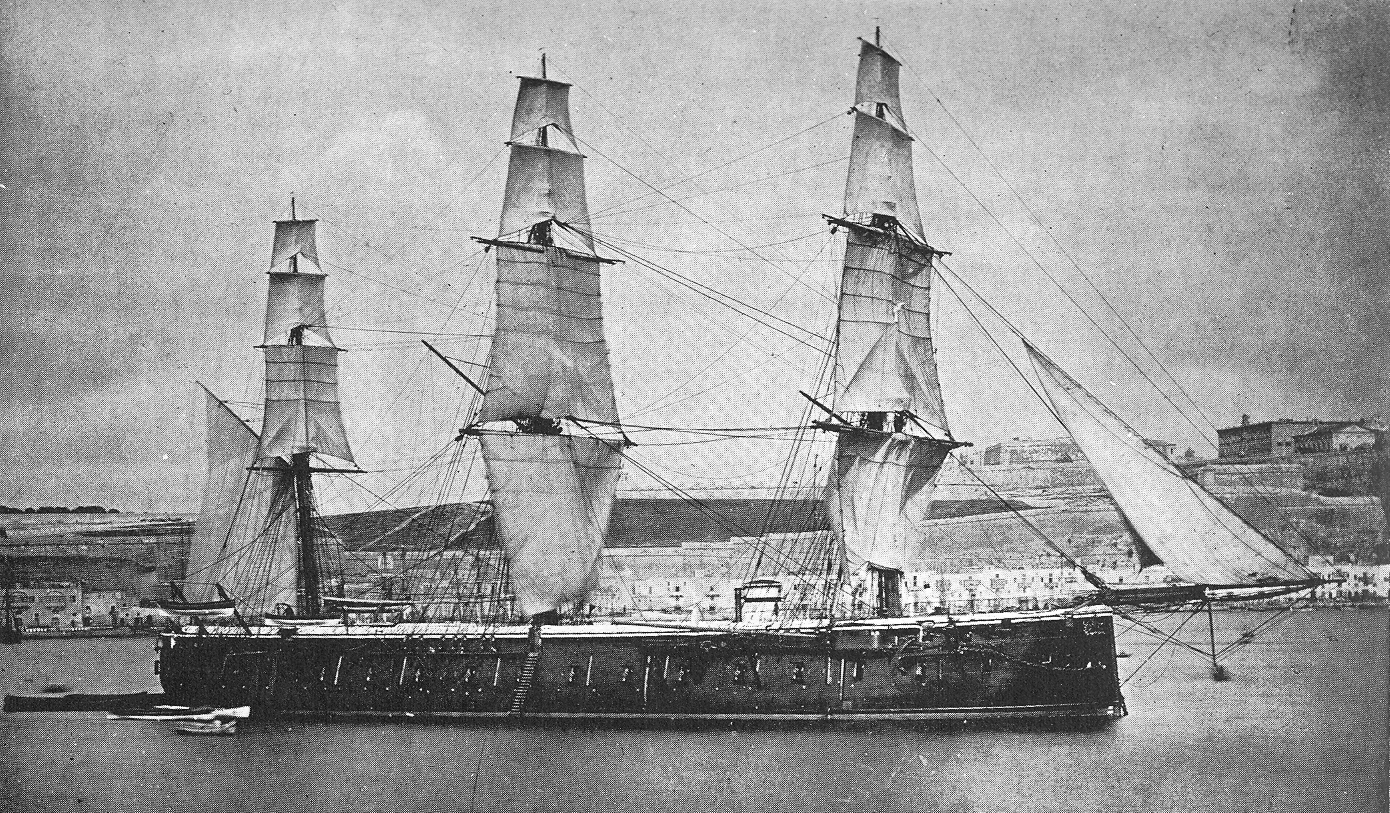
- HMS Royal Oak in 1868

Class overview
- Name: Prince Consort
- Operators: Royal Navy
- Subclasses: HMS Royal Oak
- Completed: 4
- Scrapped: 4

General characteristics (HMS Ocean)
- Type: Armoured frigate
- Displacement: 6,832 long tons (6,942 t)
- Length: 273 ft 1 in (83.2 m)
- Beam: 58 ft 5 in (17.8 m)
- Draught: 27 ft 6 in (8.4 m)
- Installed power: 8 boilers; 4,244 ihp (3,165 kW)
- Propulsion: 1 shaft; 1 Horizontal return connecting-rod steam engine
- Sail plan: Barque rig
- Speed: 12 knots (22 km/h; 14 mph)
- Range: 2,000 nmi (3,700 km; 2,300 mi) at 5 knots (9.3 km/h; 5.8 mph)
- Complement: 605
- Armament: 24 × 7-inch (180 mm) rifled muzzle-loading guns
- Armour: Belt: 3–4.5 in (76–114 mm); Battery: 3–4.5 in (76–114 mm)

The Prince Consort class of ironclad battleship were four Royal Navy wooden-hulled broadside ironclads: HMS Royal Oak, HMS Prince Consort, HMS Ocean, and HMS Caledonia. They were originally laid down as Bulwark-class battleships, but were converted to ironclads while under construction. Royal Oak was Britain's fifth ironclad battleship completed.

Prince Consort, Ocean, and Caledonia were built to a common design and are today known as the Prince Consort class, though contemporaries knew them as the Caledonia class. Royal Oak was their half-sister.

== Genesis ==
The Bulwark class of nine 91-gun two-decker steam line-of-battle ships were laid down between March 1859 and October 1860 (a further three were ordered, but never laid down, and eventually cancelled in 1863). Their dimensions were the same as HMS Duncan (101 guns), but had a new timbering plan to suit the smaller armament. The reduction in armament was intended to improve the efficiency of the guns. Bulwark and Robust were suspended in March 1861 in an advanced state of construction and were eventually broken up in March 1873 and August 1872 respectively. The remaining seven ships of the Bulwark class were less complete state and were converted into 'ironclad frigates'. Of these Triumph (later renamed Prince Consort), Ocean, and Caledonia were converted to 'broadside ironclads' with 1,000 nhp engines. Royal Oak had a similar conversion but with the original 800 nhp engine. Royal Alfred, Zealous and Repulse were later converted into 'central battery ships'.

== Reasons for the conversion programme ==
When the first British ironclads were conceived, the Surveyor (Rear Admiral Sir Baldwin Wake Walker) said, "They must be regarded as an addition to our force, as a balance to those of France, and not as calculated to supersede any existing class of ship; indeed no prudent man would, at present, consider it safe to risk up the performance of ships of this novel character, the naval Supremacy of Great Britain." For this reason, the Royal Navy continued to lay down and complete steam two-deckers and three-deckers. However, in 1861, it was clear that Britain was falling behind in ironclads laid down (see table below). The ten French ironclads laid down in 1861 were the start of the French programme of 1860, which was intended over a number of years to produce: 20 sea-going ironclads for the active fleet, 10 sea-going ironclads for the reserve fleet, and 11 floating batteries.

Year	Cumulative Sea-Going Ironclads Laid Down or Commenced Conversion		Cumulative Sea-Going Ironclads Completed	
Year	France	Britain	France	Britain
1858	3	0	0	0
1859	6	4	0	0
1860	6	4	1	0
1861	16	15	1	2
1862	16	18	6	4
1863	17	22	6	5
1864	17	23	6	10
1865	27	24	11	11

The British response to the French programme was taken in a number of steps.

On 28 September 1860, the Board of Admiralty decided to order three new iron-hulled ironclads: one large - Achilles, and two medium-size - Hector and Valiant. Though there was still great uncertainty as to the value of ironclads, and the Controller was directed to report as to their "fitness for use as transports or other duties in case it should be deemed advisable at any time to strip off their armour plates."

On 7 February 1861 Rear Admiral Sir Baldwin Wake Walker resigned as Controller. He was replaced by Rear Admiral Sir Robert Spencer Robinson.

Following a report from the British naval attaché in Paris regarding the progress of the French 1860 programme, the Naval members of the Board asked for the provision of ten new sea-going ironclads and the adaptation of ten or more existing steam line of battleships for armour protection with a total outlay of £3,000,000.

The Prime Minister, Lord Palmerston, advocated cutting down and armouring the last sailing battleships rather than reducing the number of steam line of battleships. (In 1861, the fleet of steam line of battleships were extremely modern, and comprised the main battle strength of the Royal Navy.)

The Chancellor of the Exchequer, William Ewart Gladstone, had decided in November 1859 that ironclads must be the vessels of the future. In early 1861, he was willing to accept a bigger appropriation for armoured ships if it could be offset by reduction in expenditure on wooden line of battleships. Gladstone suggested that the navy build wooden-hulled ironclads like the French.

In March 1861, construction of the Bulwark-class two-decker steam line of battleships was suspended. Then in May 1861 it was decided to convert the five least complete ships of the Bulwark class into ironclads. It was also decided to lay down three new very large iron-hulled ironclads, which became the Minotaur, Agincourt, and Northumberland.

Writing in December 1866, the Controller wrote: "The Caledonia and Ocean were ships of the line, of the largest class of two-deckers, in a certain state of advancement when in the Spring of 1861 I was appointed to the Controller’s office. The proposals I made in May 1861, to the Board, to convert these ships and three others into what they are now, was accepted, and I beg leave to call their Lordships’ attention to the concluding paragraphs of those submissions which in substance were as follows - "'No doubt is entertained that the ship would be a sufficiently good sea boat to go to the Mediterranean, if required, and that her speed would be at least as great as that estimated (12.4 knots)' - 'but while proposing this mode of action I beg leave to observe that such ships will, in my opinion, be in every way inferior to ships of the Achilles class with those modifications which we propose to make in her Plating, but I have no hesitation in making these proposals, not as the wisest, and not as the safest way of meeting the exigencies of the case, but because I am led to believe that other considerations make this plan the only practicable one.' "I certainly appeal with confidence to the Admiral’s reports as a proof that my expectation and those I held out to their Lordships in proposing these ships have been realized."

== Conversion ==
"The two-decked wooden ship which were turned into armoured frigates had their sides cut down considerably, and the main deck and its battery removed; while the armour, although about equal in weight to the parts removed, is not as high above water. the iron-clad is, therefore, less top-heavy than the wooden ship was previously to be converted; in other words the conversion has the effect of bringing down the centre of gravity of the ship."

As part of the conversion they were lengthened by 21 feet. "The object of lengthening was to provide more space for an armament mounted entirely on one deck except for chase guns. Such extensions are carried out by a process well recognised in naval architecture; which is quote possible at any stage in the building of a ship [or afterwards], not by adding to the extremities, but in cutting her in two at the point of greatest beam and separating the halves sufficiently to insert a new section between them. This is usually done by erecting a launching cradle round the stern half, moving it down the slipways on the cradle as far as required and building up the gap. In such fashion the Prince Consort, Caledonia and Ocean (as well as the Royal Alfred and Royal Oak) were each drawn out 23 feet when already partially on the frame... But as the midship portion of a hull is always the part subjected to the greatest sagging and hogging strains in a head or following sea, special care is necessary to ensure the inserted section is sufficiently strongly built in; particularly if it has to bear the burden of the engines as it did in the Prince Consort class. Exceptionally stout timbering was therefore used for the purpose in those ships; even with that their central structure sometimes exhibit signs of stress giving rise to trouble in a minor degree." "Although the added central section had a full bilge throughout, their floors rose in the old fashion forward and aft, because their underwater lines had taken shape before conversion was ordered and could not be altered without an almost entire rebuilding of the ship. This reduced the carrying capacity of the hull compared with that of a full bodied vessel such as the Bellerophon; but retained a good model for easy movement and contributed to their excellent steering qualities alike under steam and sail."

The bows of the Bulwark class were of the normal knee-shape for wooden warships. When they were converted to ironclads, the Prince Consorts and the Royal Oak were completed with stems approaching the upright above water, and this style, which was so much decried at first, had by the late-1860s won aesthetic approval. "The bow has been modified in order to dispense with overhanging weight, to increase its fitness to cleave and surmount waves, and to adapt it for ramming purposes." Though they did not have underwater rams.

"The stern has been modified in order to give protection to the rudder-head, to deflect raking shot, and to render it more fit to receive easily the blows of following waves."" "Aft the overhang of the counter was narrowed to an oval termination foreshadowing what became the normal battleship type of stern thirty years later, except that the counter was above water instead of below. As these were the first vessels with that novel design of stern they were often called 'double-enders' until the design became so common as to suggest no peculiarity." "The upper parts of the wooden rudder... showed above water, and the rudder was of the old narrow unbalanced type with a bronze neck socket to receive an iron double-tillered norman head."

As wooden-hulled ships the Prince Consorts and the Royal Oak lacked the double bottom and water-tight bulkheads given to iron-hulled vessels. However, at the time people did not consider these things necessary for wooden ships, whose sides and bottoms were very thick, and for which there was much experience. With an iron-hulled ship the "bottom is without any doubt very thin and liable to penetration by a rock or any other hard substance; but the danger resulting from penetration is very greatly reduced by the adoption of a proper number of watertight divisions or bulkheads in the ship's hold, while it may be almost got rid of by the cellular bottom, now given to all our iron-clads, which prevents the entrance of water into the hold even when the outer plating is penetrated." It should be added that before the introduction of the bracket-frame system with the Bellerophon, double-bottoms on British iron-hulled iron-clads were very partial.

== Armour ==
"In our earlier iron-clads the protection is only partial, extending over a portion of the length of the broadside. No better example of this system can be chosen than the Warrior. Her length is 380 feet, and the armoured portion is only 213 feet in length, the extremities of the ship being left entirely unprotected... The rudder head and steering apparatus are left entirely unprotected. This system of partial protection is also adopted in the Black Prince, Defence, and Resistance; but the desire to increase the amount of protection led to the introduction into the Hector and Valiant of a modification of the Warrior's disposition of armour. This modification consisted in adding a belt of plating, extending from the upper to the main decks, before and abaft the main portion of the broadside armour, which was arranged similarly to Warrior's. The main deck, on which the guns are fought, is thus protected throughout the entire length, but the extremities 'between wind and water' are quite as unprotected as those on the Warrior".

"Both these plans of disposing the armour were afterwards considered unsatisfactory, and resort was had in the Minotaur class, and in the converted ships of the Caledonia class, to the system of which had been introduced into the construction of the floating batteries built during the Crimean war, by means of which what is known as 'complete protection' is secured. Throughout the length the armour extends from the upper deck down to about 6 feet below the waterline... The principal advantages possessed by this disposition of the armour over that of the Warrior are that the extremities of the ship, especially on the parts near the water-line, are iron-cased, and that the protected guns can be ranged along the length of the broadside instead of being concentrated in a central battery. There are, however, the accompanying disadvantages of having bow and stern heavily burdened, and of the resulting increase in the total weight of armour. For wood-built iron-clads this plan has the additional advantage of protecting the upper works throughout the length from the destructive effects of shells. The French ships are, for the most part plated in this manner".

"In 1861 many verbal discussions took place between myself [the Controller] and the constructors of the day, as to the cause of the excessive rolling of our ships, when compared with similar French constructions. When I [the Controller] urged upon them the possibility of adding largely to the armour plating of the ships, and of not confining it, as had been done, in the Warrior and other ships, I was met with very great opposition, and my endeavours to get the five wooden ships wholly Armour-Plated were met by two reasons against doing so. One was, that extensive armour-plating must cause excessive rolling; and the other, that there were doubts of the stability of a ship wholly armour-plated. Now it turned out that the stability of these ships wholly armour-plated proved excessive, and, if their stability had been lessened, their rolling would have been diminished; but the Constructors of the Navy were not alone in their opinion."

"In the wood ships the [4.5 inch thick] armour was bolted on outside the planking of an ordinary line-of-battle ship, being consequently backed by about 30 inches of timbering and planking." This compared with 4.5-inch (110 mm) armour backed by 18 inches (460 mm) of teak for the Warrior class, Defence class, Achilles and the Hector class, and 5.5 in (140 mm) armour backed by 9 in (230 mm) of teak for the Minotaur class.

== Rolling ==
In the 1860s rolling was measured as the sum of the angles to port and to starboard. "Admiral Dacres Report for 1864 [on the Channel Squadron] shows that on the four days when all the ships were together, the means of the extreme rolls recorded were as follow: Hector, 10 degrees; Warrior and Defence, 10.25; Black Prince, 11.05; Prince Consort, 11.75; and Edgar (wooden line-of-battle ship), 14.25. The Warrior's rolling was measured by a different instrument from that used on board the other ships, so that she cannot fairly be compared with them. This record is, however, of great interest, on account of the comparison it renders possible between the behaviour of the iron-clads and the wooden two-decker, the latter proving the heaviest roller in the squadron. In Admiral Yelverton's Report [on the Channel Squadron] for 1866, there are given examples of the comparative rolling of several of the iron-clads, obtained from three days' observations, of which the mean results are:- Achilles and Bellerophon, 6.6 degrees; Hector, 11.3; Ocean, 14.3; Lord Clyde, 16.1; Pallas, 17.3. ... The small size of the Pallas, as compared with the other ships, puts her at a great disadvantage as regards comparative rolling in ordinary waves."

"The Achilles has a distance of about 3 feet between the centre of gravity and the metacentre, and is a remarkable steady ship; whereas the Prince Consort, with a distance of 6 feet, rolls much more than the Achilles."

== Carrying capacity of wood hulls compared with iron hulls ==
Parkes claims, "In the Service their construction was regarded as a retrograde movement, their very heavy wooden hulls having only 80 per cent of the carrying capacity of iron ones." However, this view is mistaken and unfair. The following table is taken from Reed. It shows that in 1861, wooden-hulled ironclads had a greater carrying capacity than contemporary iron-hulled designs.

It is of course true, that when Reed's bracket-frame system was introduced with the Bellerophon (laid down December 1863), iron hulls became much lighter for the same strength.

Ship	Weight of Hull (tons)	Total Weights Carried (tons)	% Weights Carried
Wooden-hulled ironclads			average 51%
Caledonia	3,382	3,367	50%
Pallas	1,812	1,844	50%
Lord Clyde	3,647	3,979	52%
Early iron-hulled ironclads			average 46%
Black Prince	4,969	4,281	46%
Defence	3,500	2,492	42%
Achilles	5,030	4,495	47%
Minotaur	5,043	5,232	51%

== Machinery ==
"The Prince Consorts were all three engined by Maudslay and Sons on an identical plan, … the arrangement of their machinery was very unusual, though not entirely without precedent in wooden-hulled steamers. When horizontal reciprocating marine engines were being installed it was necessary as a first step to select a position for the cylinders with enough athwartship level to give a proper length for the stroke… As the Prince Consorts had been shaped with an underwater run of the old style before being ordered for conversion… their floors rose considerably abaft the midship point; which meant the only practicable position for the much larger engines they were to carry was in the added central body halfway between bow and stern." (Iron-hulled ironclads had their engines further aft.) "Return-connecting-rod engines were installed."

Royal Oak's boilers were in one group of six on the forward side of the engines. The Prince Consorts' larger engines required more boilers, so they had two groups of four; one set forward of the engines, and one set further aft; this was why the Prince Consorts had two widely spaced funnels (one for each set of boilers). The Prince Consorts' boilers were not of equal size. The forward set were larger and had five furnaces each, whereas the aft boilers had three furnaces each. "Each group of boilers had its own coal bunkers abreast it". "The boilers worked at 20 lb pressure."

== Cost of construction ==
The following table compares the cost of construction of:

- Two-decker steam line of battleships of the Duncan-class. Had the Bulwark class been completed to their original design, their costs would have been similar.
- Wooden-hulled ironclad battleships of the Prince Consort class and their half-sister the Royal Oak.
- Iron-hulled ironclad battleships (the first seven laid down).

The ironclads were much more expensive both in absolute terms and in cost per ton than the steam wooden line of battleships. The cost per ton of all the ironclads listed was similar, with Prince Consort the least expensive at £36 per ton, and Achilles and Valiant the most expensive at £48 per ton.

Ship	Laid Down	Launched	Completed	Cost of Hull	Cost of Engines & Fittings	Cost of Masts, Sails, Stores, &c., until complete for Sea	Total Cost	Displacement (tons)	Cost per Ton
Duncan class steam two-deckers (wooden-hulled)							average £131,000		average £22
Duncan	2 May 1855	12 December 1859	August 1860				£132,697	5,950	£22
Gibraltar	October 1858	16 August 1860	April 1861				£130,235	5,950	£22
Wooden-hulled ironclads							average £263,000		average £39
Royal Oak	1 May 1860	10 September 1862	April 1863	£189,381	£45,310	£19,846	£254,537	6,366	£40
Prince Consort	13 August 1860	26 June 1862	April 1864	£174,392	£52,603	£15,554	£242,549	6,832	£36
Caledonia	10 October 1860	24 October 1862	April 1865	£212,763	£51,895	£18,672	£283,330	6,832	£41
Ocean	23 August 1860	19 March 1863	July 1866	£201,651	£52,162	£17,417	£271,230	6,832	£40
Iron-hulled ironclads (6,000–7,000 tons)							average £283,000		average £44
Defence	December 1859	24 April 1861	2 December 1861	£203,229	£34,357	£15,836	£253,422	6,150	£41
Resistance	December 1859	11 April 1861	2 July 1862	£208,571	£33,765	£15,784	£258,120	6,070	£43
Hector	March 1861	26 September 1862	22 February 1864	£237,911	£45,738	£10,969	£294,618	6,710	£44
Valiant	February 1861	14 October 1863	15 September 1868	£264,443	£48,323	£12,449	£325,215	6,710	£48
Iron-hulled ironclads (9,000–10,000 tons)							average £409,000		average £43
Warrior	25 May 1859	29 December 1860	24 October 1861	£282,581	£74,409	£22,164	£379,154	9,137	£41
Black Prince	12 October 1859	27 February 1861	12 September 1862	£283,511	£74,482	£20,317	£378,310	9,250	£41
Achilles	1 August 1861	23 December 1863	26 November 1864	£375,473	£69,117	£25,740	£470,330	9,829	£48

None of the cost data in the table above includes the cost of armament. Data on Duncan and Gibraltar are taken from Lambert. The date of steam trials has been taken as the date of completion. Costs probably do not include "masts, sails, stores, &c., until complete for sea". Data on the displacement and construction dates of ironclads has been taken from Conways (except for 'laid down' dates for the conversions from the Bulwark class, which were taken from Lambert. Data on costs of ironclads are the "actual outlay on labour and materials" and were taken from Reed. The costs quoted by Reed are similar (but not always identical) to those quoted in Parkes. Baxter quotes similar but not identical costs for the first four British ironclads.
