= Bulwark-class ship of the line =

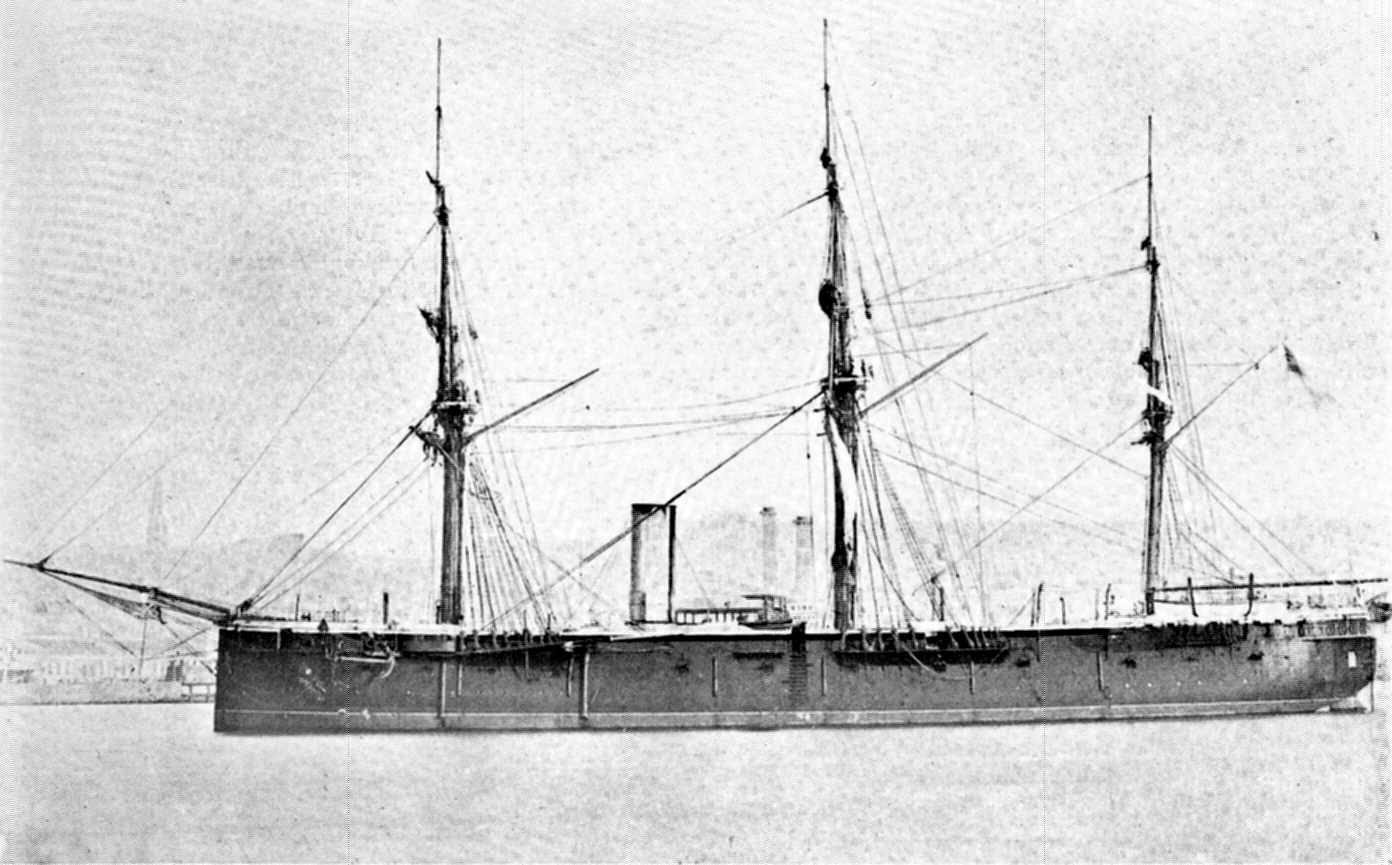
- Royal Alfred in 1867

Class overview
- Operators: Royal Navy
- Preceded by: Duncan class
- Built: 1859–1870
- In commission: 1863–1889
- Planned: 12
- Completed: 7
- Canceled: 5 (including 2 "suspended" on the stocks and never finished)

General characteristics
- Type: Steam two-decker 91-gun line-of-battle ship
- Displacement: 5,950 long tons (6,045 t)
- Tons burthen: 3715 tons BM
- Length: 252 ft (77 m) o/a; 213 ft 9.25 in (65.1574 m) in keel-line
- Beam: 58 ft (18 m)
- Draught: 25 ft 6 in (7.77 m)
- Propulsion: 800 nhp steam engine; 3,400–3,500 ihp (2,535–2,610 kW)
- Sail plan: Main mast : 67 ft × 40 in; Fore mast : 61 ft × 37 in; Mizzen mast : 51 ft 6 in × 27 in
- Speed: 12.5–13.4 knots (23.2–24.8 km/h) under power
- Complement: 860
- Armament: Gun Deck: 34 × 8-inch (204 mm) 65cwt guns; Main deck: 36 × 32-pounder/58cwt; Upper Deck: 20 × 32-pounder/45cwt, 1 × 68-pounder 95cwt gun

The Bulwark class were the final class of wooden line-of-battle ships laid down for the Royal Navy. They were laid down after HMS Warrior. In March 1861 their construction was suspended, and seven were later converted to iron-clads. HMS Bulwark and HMS Robust were kept on the stocks almost complete, in case of need, until they were scrapped in 1873 and 1872.

== Origins ==
The consensus of British naval opinion after the Crimean War favoured the large steam-powered two-decker line-of-battle ship with 101 or 91 guns. The designs for two-decker evolved. "The 101-gun type were redesigned with an extra 400 tons and engines of 800 nhp, to produce the Duncan class. The 91s were given similar engines, while their smaller increase in size was largely taken up with an additional 15 feet (4.6 m) overall for a finer length-to-beam ratio and improved lines in HMS Defiance." In the 1859 programme the two types were merged to produce a 91-gun ship with the dimensions of the 101-gun type. Two ships built on this plan - the Bulwark and Robust, the latter having been commenced as a 101-gun ship - were preserved on the stocks until 1872, the remaining seven being converted into ironclads. These last two-deckers were 252 feet (77 m) overall, that they all displayed all the classic symptoms of weak construction, such as leaky seams, demonstrated that wood was no longer suitable for the construction of the largest classes of warships.

Britain's first sea-going iron-clad, HMS Warrior was laid down in May 1859, and a further three had been laid down by the end of 1859. Nevertheless, the Royal Navy continued to convert old sailing line-of-battle ships to steam, and to order and lay down new Bulwark-class two-deckers. The objective was to achieve parity with the combined navies of France and Russia. Initially there was great uncertainty about the value of iron-clads. So it was prudent to continue building unarmoured steam line-of-battle ships, which would in any case be "the common currency of sea-power for some years to come."

In March 1861, work on the Bulwark class was suspended. They were retained on the stocks while the smaller HMS Defiance was launched on 27 March 1861. The larger ships were better suited for conversion into iron-clads and were held in reserve for that purpose. Similarly, the sailing line-of-battle ships HMS Albion and HMS Bombay completed their conversion to steam line-of-battle ships on 21 May and 25 June 1861 respectively.

== Design ==
The Bulwark class ships were a modification of the 101-gun Duncan-class design. They had the same dimensions, but had a new timbering plan dated 29 July 1858, which suited the smaller armament. The reduction in armament was intended to improve the efficiency of the guns.

== Key Dates ==
The following table shows key dates for the Bulwark class.

Ship	Builder	Ordered	Laid Down	Suspended	Converted to Ironclad	Launched	Completed	Broken Up
HMS Bulwark	Chatham	9 April 1856	8 Mar 1859	7 Mar 1861				Mar 1873
HMS Robust	Devonport	1 April 1857	31 Oct 1859	22 Mar 1861				Aug 1872
HMS Repulse	Woolwich	1 April 1857	19 Apr 1859		1866	25 Apr 1868	31 Jan 1870	1889
HMS Zealous	Pembroke	1 April 1857	21 Oct 1859		1864	7 Mar 1864	4 Oct 1866	1886
HMS Royal Alfred	Portsmouth	8 April 1859	1 Dec 1859		22 Jun 1861	15 Oct 1864	23 Mar 1867	1885
HMS Royal Oak	Chatham	8 April 1859	1 May 1860		3 Jun 1861	10 Sep 1862	Apr 1863	1885
HMS Triumph completed as Prince Consort	Pembroke	8 April 1859	13 Aug 1860		6 Jun 1861	26 Jun 1862	Apr 1864	1882
HMS Caledonia	Woolwich	5 March 1860	10 Oct 1860		6 Jun 1861	24 Oct 1862	Apr 1865	1886
HMS Ocean	Devonport	5 March 1860	23 Aug 1860		3 Jun 1861	19 Mar 1863	Jul 1866	1886
HMS Kent	Portsmouth	5 March 1860	10 Oct 1860	Laid down but never launched. Cancelled 12 December 1863.				
HMS Blake	Pembroke	5 March 1860	Ordered but never laid down. Cancelled 12 December 1863.					
HMS Pitt	Chatham	5 March 1860	Ordered but never laid down. Cancelled 12 December 1863.					

== Conversion to iron-clads ==
Bulwark and Robust were suspended on the stocks in March 1861 in an advanced state of construction. The Controller "had plans prepared for the Bulwark to be converted into a twin turret breastwork monitor but they were never used. As Edward Reed pointed out this was a wise policy as they would have been inferior to, and yet more costly than, iron-hulled ships built from scratch." "In war time the rapidity with which these ships might be converted into iron-clads would probably outweigh these considerations". Bulwark and Robust were eventually broken up in March 1873 and August 1872 respectively.

The remaining seven ships of the Bulwark class were in a less complete state and were converted into 'ironclad frigates'.

Of these HMS Triumph (later renamed HMS Prince Consort), HMS Ocean, and HMS Caledonia were converted to 'broadside ironclads' with 1000 nhp engines. HMS Royal Oak had a similar conversion but with the original 800 nhp engine. The development of these four ships is discussed in the article on the Prince Consort class.

HMS Royal Alfred, HMS Zealous and HMS Repulse were later converted into 'central battery ships'.
