= HMS Prince Consort =

1862 Royal Navy broadside ironclad

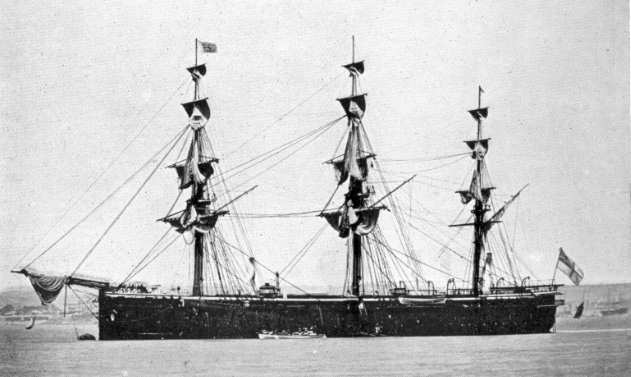
- Sister ship Caledonia

History

United Kingdom
- Name: Prince Consort
- Namesake: Title of Prince Albert
- Builder: HM Dockyard, Pembroke
- Laid down: 13 Aug 1860
- Launched: 26 June 1862
- Completed: 6 February 1864
- Commissioned: 27 October 1863
- Decommissioned: 1871
- Renamed: as Prince Consort, 14 February 1862
- Fate: Sold for scrap, March 1882

General characteristics As completed
- Class & type: Prince Consort-class ironclad
- Tonnage: 4,045 (bm)
- Displacement: 6,430 long tons (6,533 t)
- Length: 273 ft 1 in (83.2 m)
- Beam: 58 ft 7 in (17.9 m)
- Draught: 26 ft 10 in (8.2 m)
- Installed power: 8 rectangular fire-tube boilers; 4,234 ihp (3,157 kW)
- Propulsion: 1 shaft; 1 horizontal-return, connecting rod-steam engine
- Sail plan: barque rigged
- Speed: 12.8 knots (23.7 km/h; 14.7 mph) under power; 10 knots (19 km/h; 12 mph) under sail
- Range: 2,000 nmi (3,700 km; 2,300 mi) at 5 knots (9.3 km/h; 5.8 mph)
- Complement: 605
- Armament: 1864 : 7 × 7 in (178 mm) breech-loading rifles; 8 × 100 pdr smoothbore guns; 16 × 68 pdr smoothbore guns; 1867 : 4 × 8 in (203 mm) muzzle-loading rifles; 20 × 7 in (178 mm) muzzle-loading rifles; 1871 : 7 × 9 in (229 mm) muzzle-loading rifles; 8 × 8 in (203 mm) muzzle-loading rifles
- Armour: Waterline belt: 3–4.5 in (76–114 mm); Battery: 4.5 in (114 mm)

HMS Prince Consort was the lead ship of her class (Note: Some sources refer to the Prince Consort class as the Caledonia or Ocean class.) of wooden-hulled, broadside ironclads built for the Royal Navy (RN) during the 1860s. She was laid down in 1860 as a 91-gun, second-rate Bulwark-class ship of the line, named Triumph, but was renamed Prince Consort two years later following the death of Prince Albert of Saxe-Coburg and Gotha, the husband of Queen Victoria. The ship was converted into an armoured frigate from 1861 to 1864.

Her first posting after commissioning in 1863 was to Liverpool; on her passage there, during a gale in the Irish Sea, it was found that she did not have enough scuppers fitted to discharge seawater coming aboard, and almost foundered. She served in the Channel Fleet from 1864 until 1867, when she was paid off to re-arm. From 1867 to 1871 she formed part of the Mediterranean Fleet, until she was brought home for a further re-armament. Prince Consort was reduced to reserve afterwards, but she saw no further sea service. By 1882 the ship had fallen into disrepair and was sold for scrap that same year.

== Bulwark-class ship of the line ==
The second batch of Bulwark-class ships, including Prince Consort, were ordered in 1859 during an arms race between France and Britain in steam-powered ships of the line. They were based on the 101-gun Duncan class and modified to suit the smaller number of guns. Prince Consort was the first ship of her name, and as of 2020, has been the only vessel with that name to serve in the RN. She was ordered under the name of Triumph from HM Dockyard, Pembroke, on 8 April 1857, laid down on 13 August 1859 and was renamed on 14 February 1862.

The Bulwark class had a length between perpendiculars of 252 feet (76.8 m), a beam of 58 feet (17.7 m), a depth of hold of 25 feet 6 inches (7.8 m) and measured 3,715 62/94 tons burthen. Their armament consisted of thirty-four 8 in (203 mm) shell guns on their lower gun deck and thirty-six 32-pounder (58 cwt) guns (Note: "Cwt" is the abbreviation for hundredweight, 58 cwt referring to the weight of the gun.) on the upper gundeck. Between their forecastle and quarterdeck, they carried twenty 32-pounder (45 cwt) guns and a single 68-pounder (95 cwt) gun. The ships were powered by a two-cylinder, horizontal marine steam engine producing 800 nominal horsepower to drive a single propeller.

== Ironclad conversion and description ==
Conversion of Triumph into an ironclad was ordered on 31 May 1861 and work began on 6 June to remove her upper deck. The ship had only been framed before work on wooden steam ships of the line was suspended, so it was easy to insert to a 21-foot (6.4 m) section amidships to bear the additional weight of the armour and guns. This increased her length to 273 feet 1 inch (83.2 m) and her beam slightly increased to 58 feet 7 inches (17.9 m). She had a draught of 24 feet (7.3 m) forward and 26 feet 10 inches (8.2 m) aft. Her tonnage increased to 4,045 tons burthen. Triumph displaced 6,430 long tons (6,530 t) after the conversion. Her crew numbered 605 officers and ratings. Prince Consort had a metacentric height of 6.01 feet (1.8 m) which meant that she rolled a lot and was an unsteady gun platform.

The ship's 1000-nominal-horsepower engine was a two-cylinder horizontal-return, connecting rod-steam engine that drove a single screw propeller. The engine used steam provided by eight rectangular fire-tube boilers which were separated into two compartments fore and aft of the mainmast. Each boiler room was fitted with a funnel that could be retracted to reduce drag when under sail. The engine produced 3,953 indicated horsepower (2,948 kW) during the ship's sea trials on 8 March 1865 which gave her a maximum speed of 12.8 knots (23.7 km/h; 14.7 mph), fully rigged and with consumables. The ship carried a maximum of 550 long tons (560 t) of coal that gave her a range of 2,000 nautical miles (3,700 km; 2,300 mi) at 5 knots (9.3 km/h; 5.8 mph).

Prince Consort was fitted with three masts; initially she had a double topsail barque rig with a sail area of 25,000 square feet (2,300 m^{2}). One of her topsails was removed around 1865; yards were added to the ship's mizzenmast the following year and that gave her a full ship rig which she retained for the rest of her career. Her best speed with the propeller disconnected and under sail alone was 10 knots (19 km/h; 12 mph).

=== Armament and armour ===
The ship was initially armed with seven 7-inch (178 mm) Armstrong rifled breech-loading guns. Three of these guns were mounted on the upper deck as chase guns. The four remaining guns were positioned on the main deck, and these were supplemented by eight 100-pounder and sixteen 68-pounder smoothbore muzzle-loading guns, all on the broadside. In 1867, Prince Consort's armament was entirely replaced by twenty 7-inch and four 8-inch (203 mm) rifled, muzzle-loading guns. Four of the 7-inch guns were mounted on the upper deck as chase guns. In November 1871, the ship was again rearmed with eight 8-inch and seven 9-inch (229 mm) rifled muzzle-loading guns. Three of the 9-inch guns served as chase guns.

The entire side of the Prince Consort-class ships, from the upper-deck level downwards, was protected by wrought-iron armour that reduced from 4.5 inches (114 mm) amidships to 3 inches (76 mm) at the ends. The armour extended 5 feet 6 inches (1.7 m) below the waterline. One small conning tower was fitted on each side of the upper deck amidships, but these proved to be untenable when the ship's guns were fired. The armour was backed by the wooden sides of the ship which were 29.5 inches (749 mm) thick.

== Construction and career ==
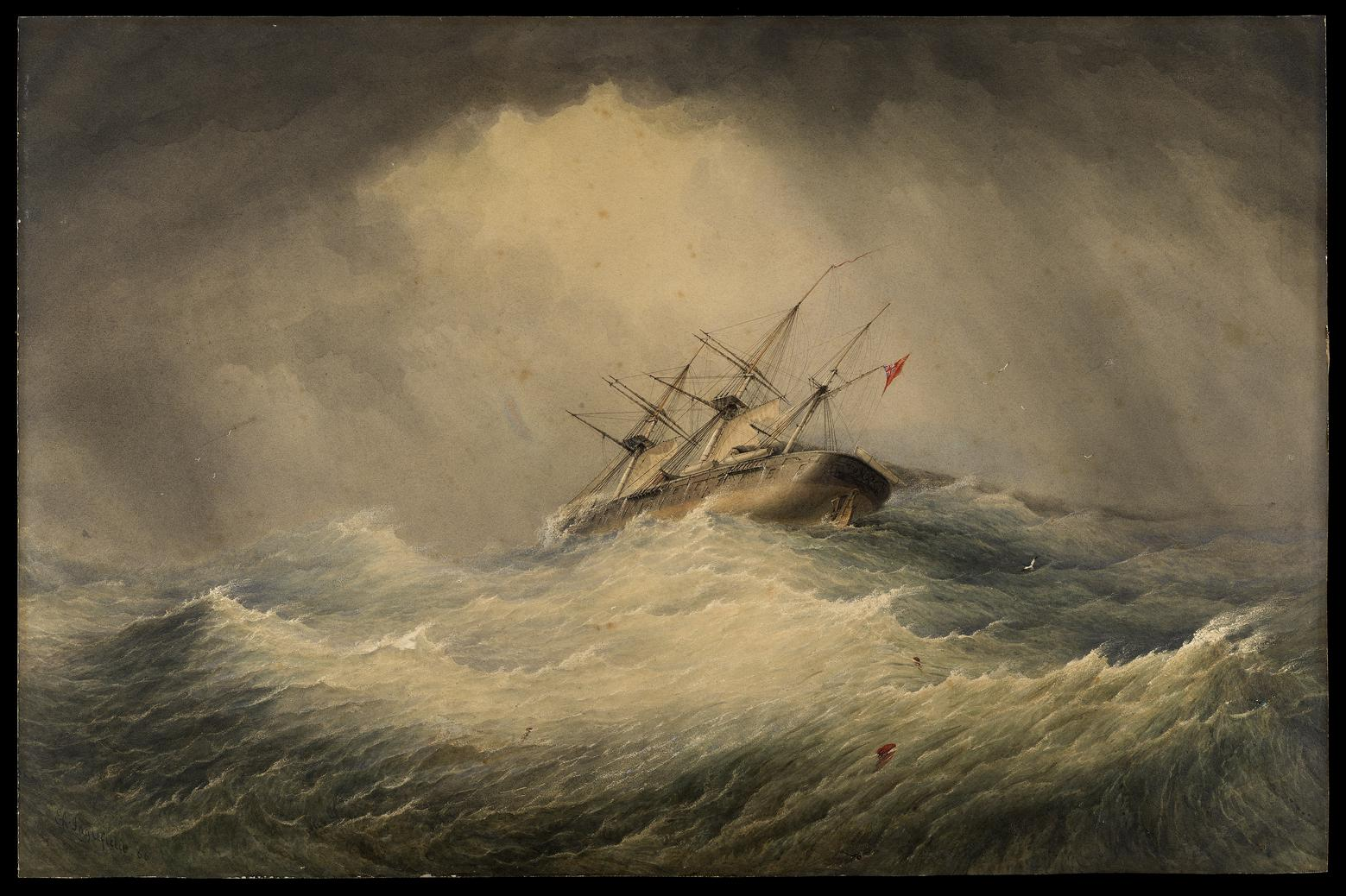
HMS Prince Consort in a gale (1866), watercolour by Edward Inglefield

Prince Consort was launched on 26 June 1862 and commissioned for trials under Captain Charles Vesey on 27 October 1863. Just after finishing them, the ship was ordered to Liverpool with a scratch crew drawn from other ships in Plymouth. Her mission was a show of force to prevent two turret ironclads from being turned over to their Confederate Navy owners by their builder, Laird Brothers. En route, she encountered a strong gale in the Irish Sea off the coast of Wales that caused her to roll so much that the sea poured over the 7-foot-high (2.1 m) bulwarks faster than it could be drained because her scuppers were too small. The single steam-powered pump failed, but the four hand pumps proved to be barely adequate to keep Prince Consort afloat until she was able to seek shelter in Kingstown (modern Dún Laoghaire) roadstead. She was paid off on 10 November.

The ship was recommissioned by Captain George Willes on 14 January 1864 and was assigned to the Channel Squadron. The ship was one of the ironclads present when the Prince and Princess of Wales reviewed a French squadron as they made a port visit to Plymouth in July 1865. The following month, the Channel Squadron, including Prince Consort, made a ceremonial visit to Cherbourg and then to Brest where the crews exchanged visits to each other's ships and the officers attended balls and banquets. Captain Edward Inglefield assumed command on 10 April 1866, and Prince Consort was transferred to the Mediterranean the following year after replacing her armament. Inglefield was replaced by Captain William Armytage on 3 March 1868 and rejoined the Channel Squadron in 1869. She was paid off in 1871 at HM Dockyard, Devonport, rearmed, and placed in reserve. Prince Consort's hull was starting to deteriorate by 1882, and she was sold to Castle's Shipbreakers in March. The ship was demolished at Charlton, London.
