= Tenedos (disambiguation) =

Tenedos is an island in the northeast Aegean Sea, and part of the province Çanakkale of Turkey.

Tenedos may also refer to :

== Places ==
- Tenedos (Pamphylia), a town of ancient Pamphylia, now in Turkey
- Fort Tenedos, a defunct Zulu fort

== Ships ==
- HMS Tenedos, ships and a training establishment of the British Royal Navy
- Tenedos class frigate, sail frigates of the Russian Imperial Navy
- USS Tenedos (1861), a ship of the Stone Fleet of the Union Navy

== Animals ==
- Tenedos (spider)

== See also ==
- Battle of Tenedos
