= Arthur Cochrane (Royal Navy officer) =

Royal Navy Admiral (1824–1905)

Admiral The Honourable Sir Arthur Cochrane KCB
- Born: 24 September 1824
- Died: 20 August 1905 (aged 80)
- Military career
- Allegiance: United Kingdom
- Branch: Royal Navy
- Service years: 1839–1886
- Rank: Admiral
- Commands: HMS Horatio; HMS Niger; HMS Warrior; HMS Cumberland; Pacific Station
- Conflicts: Oriental Crisis; Crimean War; Second Opium War
- Awards: Knight Commander of the Order of the Bath

Admiral Sir Arthur Auckland Leopold Pedro Cochrane, KCB (24 September 1824 – 20 August 1905) was a Royal Navy officer who served as Commander-in-Chief, Pacific Station.

== Naval career ==
Born the third son of the tenth Earl of Dundonald, Cochrane joined the Royal Navy in 1839. He fought at Acre where he was wounded during the Oriental Crisis in 1840.

He was flag lieutenant on the North America and West Indies Station, when his father was the commander-in chief of that station. Following the court martial of Commander Reynell C. Michell, who was dismissed his ship for grounding HMS Sappho on 6 December 1849, he was appointed acting commander of HMS Sappho on 19 March 1850. He was later confirmed the rank of commander and continued on HMS Sappho until she was paid off at Chatham on 2 November 1852.

Promoted to captain in 1854, he was given command of HMS Horatio at Sheerness and then served in the Baltic Sea during the Crimean War, where he devised a method of towing torpedoes to their target using kites in 1855.

He then took command of HMS Niger in which he took part in the destruction of the Chinese Fleet in October 1856 during the Second Opium War. He later commanded HMS Warrior and then HMS Cumberland. He was appointed Superintendent of Sheerness dockyard in 1869 and Commander-in-Chief, Pacific Station in 1873. He was promoted to admiral in December 1881, and retired from the navy in June 1886. In retirement he was involved in managing the Trinidad Lake Asphalt Company.

In 1863 he petitioned for grant of a patent relating to "improvements in propelling and steering ships", and in 1864 for "improvements in apparatus for heating and evaporating liquids and fluids". The latter became void in 1873.

In a letter to The Times in 1902, Admiral Cochrane wrote about attending the enthronement festivities of King Louis Philippe I of the French in Paris in 1830, being present at the Coronation of Queen Victoria in 1838, and the (at that point) recent Coronation of King Edward VII and Queen Alexandra earlier the same year.

Cochrane was appointed a Companion of the Order of the Bath (CB) and promoted to Knight Commander (KCB) in the 1889 Birthday Honours.

Military offices
Preceded by Sir Charles Hillyar	Commander-in-Chief, Pacific Station; 1873–1876	Succeeded by George Hancock
