= George Hancock (Royal Navy officer) =

Rear-Admiral George Hancock
- Born: c. 1819
- Died: 20 September 1876
- Military career
- Allegiance: United Kingdom
- Branch: Royal Navy
- Service years: 1834 - 1876
- Rank: Rear Admiral
- Commands: HMS Immortalité; HMS Trafalgar; HMS Duncan; HMS Duke of Wellington; Pacific Station

Rear-Admiral George Hancock (c. 1819 – 20 September 1876) was a Royal Navy officer who served as Commander-in-Chief, Pacific Station.

== Naval career ==
Hancock joined the Royal Navy in 1834. As a Commander he was regarded as an innovator in medical matters and insisted that the ship's surgeon had his own cabin. Promoted to captain in 1855, he was given command of HMS Immortalité, HMS Trafalgar, HMS Duncan and HMS Duke of Wellington. He was promoted rear-admiral in 1872. He was appointed Commander-in-Chief, Pacific Station in 1876. He died in this role in September 1876.

Military offices
Preceded by Sir Arthur Cochrane	Commander-in-Chief, Pacific Station; April 1876–September 1876	Succeeded by Sir Algernon de Horsey
