= HMS Tenedos =

Four ships and a training establishment of the Royal Navy have borne the name HMS Tenedos, after the island of Tenedos:

== Ships ==
- HMS Tenedos (1812) was a 38-gun fifth rate launched in 1812. She was used as a convict hulk from 1843 and was broken up in 1875.
- HMS Tenedos (1870) was a wooden Eclipse-class screw sloop launched in 1870. She was rated as a corvette from 1875 and was sold in 1887. Served in the Zulu War in 1879, with 60 men landed for service ashore in the Naval Brigade. Fort Tenedos on the Zulu bank of the Thukela was built by her crew and named after her.
- HMS Tenedos (1904) was a depot ship for torpedo boat destroyers at Devonport. She was the former HMS Triumph, renamed HMS Tenedos in 1904. She was transferred to Chatham Dockyard in 1906 to become a training establishment.
- HMS Tenedos (H04) was an S-class destroyer launched in 1918 and sunk in 1942.

== Training establishments ==
- HMS Tenedos (training establishment) was a training establishment at Chatham for boy artificers. It was established in 1906 aboard the old HMS Triumph, but closed in 1910. A number of other ships were renamed HMS Tenedos whilst serving as homes for the establishment:
  - HMS Triumph was the original HMS Tenedos between 1906 and 1910.
  - HMS Duncan was HMS Tenedos II between 1905 and 1910.
  - HMS Ganges was HMS Tenedos III between 1906 and 1910.

== See also ==
- Tenedos (disambiguation)
