= HMS Royal Oak (1862) =

Prince Consort-class armoured frigate

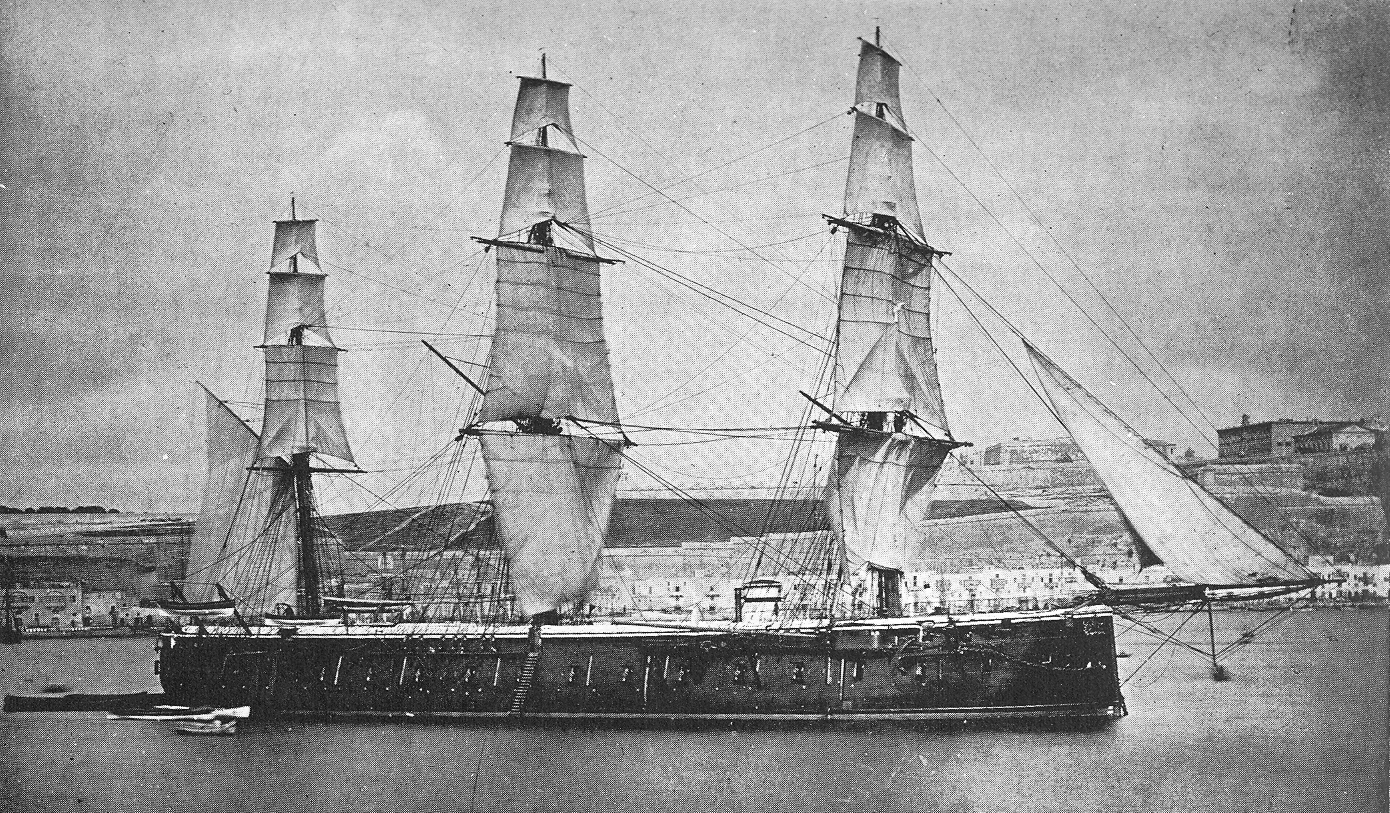
- Royal Oak In Grand Harbour circa 1867 after being re-armed

History

United Kingdom
- Name: Royal Oak
- Namesake: Royal Oak
- Builder: Chatham Dockyard
- Laid down: 1 May 1860
- Launched: 10 September 1862
- Completed: 28 May 1863
- Commissioned: April 1863
- Decommissioned: 1871
- Fate: Broken up, 1885

General characteristics (as completed)
- Class & type: Prince Consort-class armoured frigate
- Displacement: 6,366 long tons (6,468 t)
- Length: 273 ft (83.2 m)
- Beam: 58 ft 6 in (17.8 m)
- Draught: 25 ft 2 in (7.7 m)
- Installed power: 3,704 ihp (2,762 kW); 6 rectangular boilers
- Propulsion: 1 shaft, 1 Horizontal return connecting-rod steam engine
- Sail plan: Barque rig
- Speed: 12 knots (22 km/h; 14 mph)
- Range: 2,200 nmi (4,100 km; 2,500 mi) at 5 knots (9.3 km/h; 5.8 mph)
- Complement: 585
- Armament: 24 × 68-pounder guns; 11 × 110-pounder guns
- Armour: Belt: 3–4.5 in (76–114 mm); Battery: 3–4.5 in (76–114 mm)

HMS Royal Oak was a armoured frigate (Note: Ironclad is the all-encompassing term for armored warships of this period. Armoured frigates were basically designed for the same role as traditional wooden frigates, but this later changed as the size and expense of these ships forced them to be used in the line of battle.) in the Prince Consort-class built for the Royal Navy in the 1860s. The lead ship of her class, she is sometimes described as a half-sister to the other three ships because of her different engine and boiler arrangements. Like her sisters, she was converted into an ironclad from a wooden ship of the line that was still under construction.

The ship spent most of her career with the Mediterranean Fleet, only briefly serving with the Channel Fleet. Royal Oak returned home in 1871 for a refit, but was instead placed in reserve to save money. Fourteen years later, still in reserve, she was sold for scrap in 1885.

== Design and description ==
HMS Royal Oak was 273 feet (83.2 m) long between perpendiculars and had a beam of 58 feet 6 inches (17.8 m). The ship had a draught of 23 feet 11 inches (7.3 m) forward and 25 feet 2 inches (7.7 m) aft. She displaced 6,366 long tons (6,468 t) and had a tonnage of 4,056 tons burthen.

Royal Oak had a low centre of gravity which meant that she rolled a lot and was an unsteady gun platform. She was, however, very handy and sailed well in all weathers under sail or steam. Her crew consisted of 585 officers and ratings.

=== Propulsion ===
Royal Oak had a simple horizontal 2-cylinder horizontal return connecting-rod steam engine, built by Maudslay, that drove a single propeller shaft using steam that was provided by six rectangular boilers. The engine produced 3,704 indicated horsepower (2,762 kW) during the ship's sea trials on 15 June 1863 which gave the ship a maximum speed of 12.5 knots (23.2 km/h; 14.4 mph) under steam. She carried a maximum of 550 long tons (560 t) of coal, enough to steam 2,200 nautical miles (4,100 km; 2,500 mi) at 5 knots (9.3 km/h; 5.8 mph).

The ship was initially barque-rigged with three masts and had a sail area of 25,000 square feet (2,300 m^{2}). Yards were added to the ship's mizzenmast in June 1866 and Royal Oak was given a full ship rig which she retained for the rest of her career. Her propeller was designed to be disconnected and hoisted up into the stern of the ship to reduce drag while under sail, but this was rarely done because there was no bulkhead surrounding the hoisting holes which could have flooded the ship if their covers had been removed in even a moderate sea. To further reduce drag, the funnel was telescopic and could be lowered. Her best speed with the propeller disconnected and under sail alone was 13.5 knots (25.0 km/h; 15.5 mph), the fastest of any British ironclad, and she was the only ship to exceed her best speed using steam while under sail.

=== Armament ===
Royal Oak was initially armed with 24 smoothbore, muzzle-loading (SBML) 68-pounder guns on the main deck and 11 rifled breech-loading (RBL) Armstrong seven-inch, 110-pounder guns. Eight of these were also on the main deck and the other three served as chase guns on the upper deck, two at the bow and one aft.

The 7.9-inch (201 mm) solid shot of the 68-pounder gun weighed approximately 68 pounds (30.8 kg) while the gun itself weighed 10,640 pounds (4,826.2 kg). The gun had a muzzle velocity of 1,579 ft/s (481 m/s) and had a range of 3,200 yards (2,900 m) at an elevation of 12°. The seven-inch (178 mm) shell of the 110-pounder Armstrong breech-loader weighed 107–110 pounds (48.5–49.9 kg). It had a muzzle velocity of 1,150 ft/s (350 m/s) and, at an elevation of 11.25°, a maximum range of 4,000 yards (3,700 m). All of the guns could fire both solid shot and explosive shells.

The ship's original armament was replaced during her 1867 refit with 20 seven-inch and 8 eight-inch (203 mm) rifled muzzle-loading guns, four of the seven-inch guns were chase guns. The shell of the 15-calibre eight-inch gun weighed 175 pounds (79.4 kg) while the gun itself weighed nine long tons (9.1 t). It had a muzzle velocity of 1,410 ft/s (430 m/s) and was credited with the ability to penetrate a 9.6 inches (244 mm) of wrought iron armour at the muzzle. The 16-calibre seven-inch gun weighed 6.5 long tons (6.6 t) and fired a 112-pound (50.8 kg) shell that was able penetrate 7.7-inch (196 mm) of armour.

=== Armour ===
The entire side of the Prince Consort-class ships, from the upper-deck level downwards, was protected by wrought iron armour that tapered from 3 inches (76 mm) at the ends to 4.5 inches (114 mm) amidships. The armour extended 5 feet 6 inches (1.7 m) below the waterline and was backed by the sides of the hull which were 29.5 inches (749 mm) thick.

== Construction and service ==
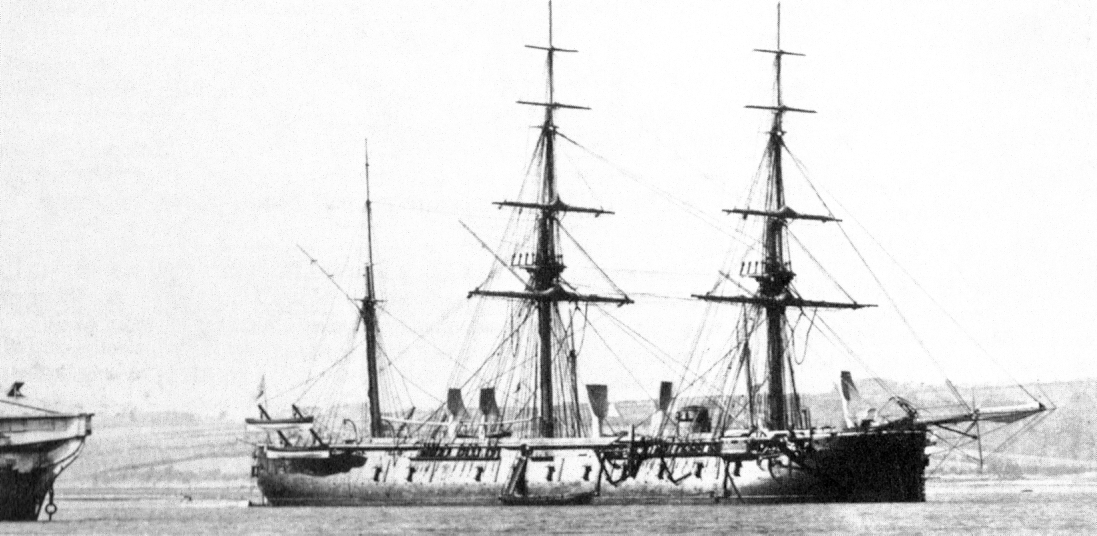
Royal Oak with her funnel lowered and windsails rigged for ventilation, sometime prior to the 1866 addition of yards to her mizzen

Royal Oak, named for the English oak tree within which King Charles II hid to escape after his defeat at Battle of Worcester in 1651, was laid down on 1 May 1860 at Chatham Dockyard as a 90-gun Bulwark-class ship of the line. She was ordered to be converted to an ironclad on 14 May 1861 and was launched on 10 September 1862. The ship was commissioned in April 1863 to run her trials and completed on 28 May, for the price of £245,537.

Royal Oak briefly served with the Channel Fleet before she was transferred to the Mediterranean Fleet. She was paid off for a refit and re-arming in 1867, and then rejoined the Channel Fleet for six months. She was accidentally rammed by HMS Warrior in heavy weather at night on 14 August 1868; the impact sheared off the main and mizzen chainplates as well as all the boats on the starboard side. Three months later the ship returned to the Mediterranean, and was present at the opening of the Suez Canal on 15 November 1869, where she grounded on an uncharted sandbank outside Port Said, Egypt, without sustaining any damage. She paid off for an extensive refit at Portsmouth at the end of 1871, but was instead laid up as an economy measure. Royal Oak remained in fourth-class reserve for 14 years until she was no longer worth repairing and was sold for breaking up on 30 September 1885.

== Memorials ==
A block of housing within the new development at "Rochester Riverside" has been named after this ship.
