= HMS Zealous (1864) =

British Bulwark-class armoured frigates

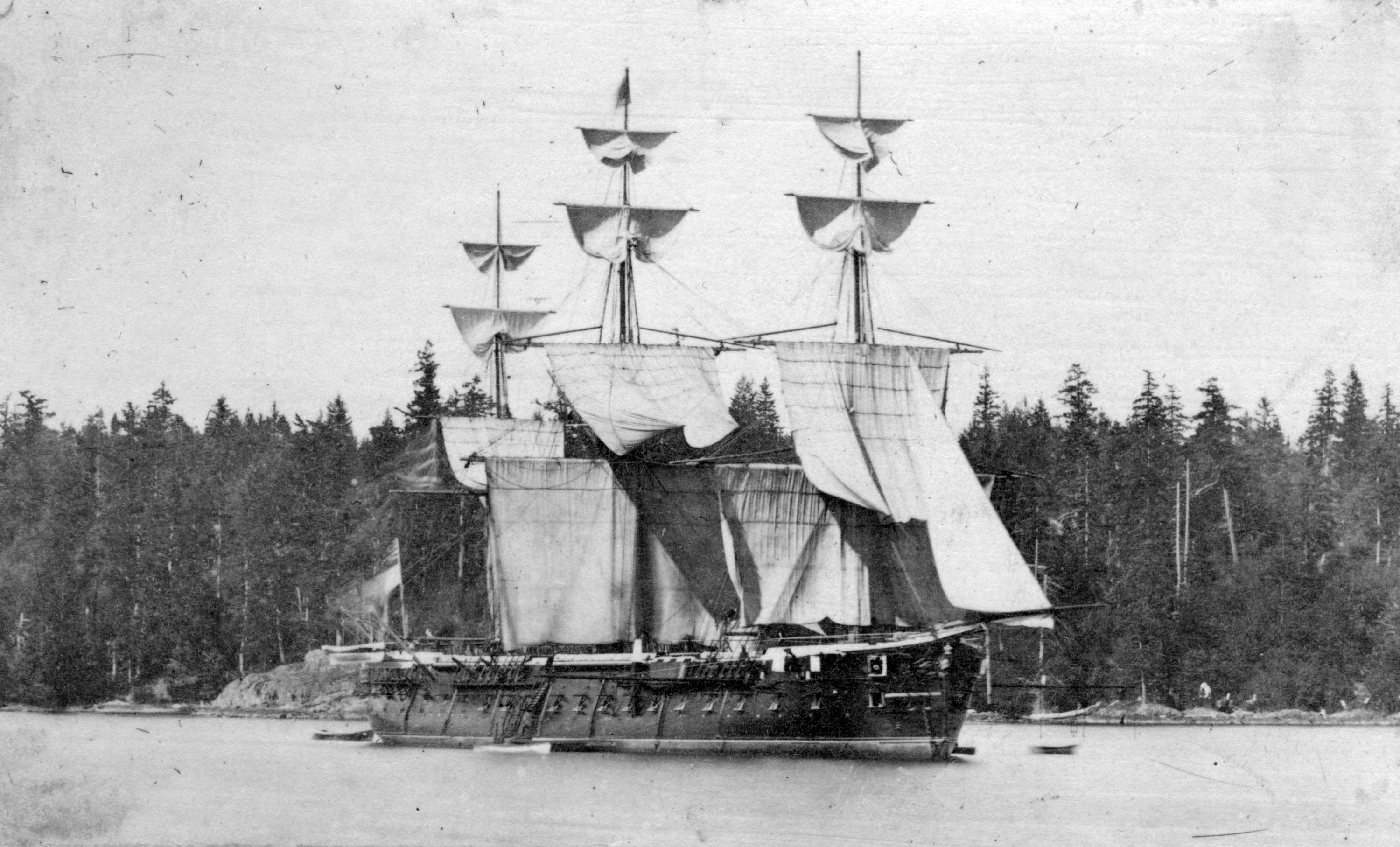
- HMS Zealous at Esquimalt with her sails set

History

United Kingdom
- Name: Zealous
- Laid down: 24 October 1859
- Launched: 7 March 1864
- Completed: 4 October 1866
- Commissioned: September 1866
- Decommissioned: 1875
- Fate: Sold for scrap, September 1886

General characteristics
- Type: Armoured frigate
- Displacement: 6,096 long tons (6,194 t)
- Length: 252 ft (76.8 m)
- Beam: 58 ft 7 in (17.9 m)
- Draught: 25 ft 9 in (7.8 m)
- Installed power: 3,623 ihp (2,702 kW)
- Propulsion: 1 shaft, 1 Horizontal return connecting-rod steam engine; 6 boilers
- Sail plan: Ship rig
- Speed: 11 knots (20 km/h; 13 mph)
- Complement: 510
- Armament: 20 × 7-inch (180 mm) muzzle-loading guns
- Armour: Belt: 2.5–4.5 in (64–114 mm); Battery: 4.5 in (114 mm); Bulkheads: 4.5 in (114 mm)

HMS Zealous was one of the three ships (the others being HMS Royal Alfred and HMS Repulse) forming the second group of wooden steam battleships selected in 1860 for conversion to ironclads. This was done in response to the perceived threat to Britain offered by the large French ironclad building programme. The ship was ordered to the West Coast of Canada after she was completed to represent British interests in the Eastern Pacific Ocean. Zealous became the flagship for the Pacific Station for six years until she was relieved in 1872. She was refitted upon her arrival and subsequently became the guard ship at Southampton until she was paid off in 1875. The ship was in reserve until she was sold for scrap in 1886.

== Design and description ==
HMS Zealous was given a straight stem and a rounded stern, but her hull was otherwise unmodified from her original form; it had been found that lengthening the hull, as was done in the earlier Prince Consort class, led to longitudinal weakness. Her conversion to a central-battery ironclad therefore cost less than that of any of her contemporaries, though this was offset with a shorter battery and therefore a less effective broadside. She also carried less armour than the earlier class, and was nearly a knot slower; however, as she was built to serve in distant waters, and not expected to face opposing ships of significant force, these shortcomings were thought acceptable.

Zealous was 252 feet (76.8 m) long between perpendiculars and had a beam of 58 feet 7 inches (17.9 m). The ship had a draught of 25 feet (7.6 m) forward and 25 feet 9 inches (7.8 m) aft. She displaced 6,096 long tons (6,194 t).

=== Propulsion ===
Zealous had a simple horizontal 2-cylinder horizontal return connecting-rod steam engine driving a single four-bladed, 19-foot-1-inch (5.8 m) propeller. Steam was provided by eight rectangular fire-tube boilers at a working pressure of 22 psi (152 kPa; 2 kgf/cm^{2}). The engine produced 3,623 indicated horsepower (2,702 kW) during the ship's sea trials in November 1866 which gave her a maximum speed of 11.7 knots (21.7 km/h; 13.5 mph). Zealous carried a maximum of 660 long tons (670 t) of coal. She was ship rigged with three masts and had a sail area of 29,200 square feet (2,710 m^{2}). Her best speed with the propeller disconnected and under sail alone was 10.5 knots (19.4 km/h; 12.1 mph).

=== Armament ===
All of the available 9-inch (229 mm) and 8-inch (203 mm) guns had already been earmarked for other, more powerful ships. Zealous therefore received an armament of 7-inch (178 mm) guns, which were deemed adequate for her expected service activity, and which, indeed, she retained for the whole of her active career. She was the only battleship ever to have a uniform armament of this calibre, and she, and her half sister HMS Repulse, were the only Victorian ironclads to retain their original armament unchanged through their entire active careers.

Zealous was armed with twenty 7-inch rifled muzzle-loading guns. Four of these guns were mounted on the upper deck as chase guns, two each fore and aft. The 16-calibre 7-inch gun weighed 6.5 long tons (6.6 t) and fired a 112-pound (50.8 kg) shell. It was credited with the nominal ability to penetrate 7.7-inch (196 mm) armour.

=== Armour ===
Zealous had a complete waterline belt of wrought iron that was 4.5 inches (114 mm) thick amidships and tapered to 2.5 inches (64 mm) thick at the bow and stern. From the level of the main deck, it reached 6 feet (1.8 m) below the waterline. The guns on the main deck amidships were protected by a section of 4.5-inch armour, 103 feet (31.4 m) long, with 4.5-inch transverse bulkheads at each end which left the chase guns unprotected. The armour was backed by the sides of the ship which consisted of 30.5 inches (770 mm) of teak. The total weight of her armour was 790 long tons (800 t).

== Service history ==
HMS Zealous was laid down on 26 October 1859 as a wooden two-deck, 90-gun ship of the line by HM Dockyard, Pembroke, but her construction was suspended pending experience with the conversion of her half-sisters of the Prince Consort class to broadside ironclads. The Admiralty ordered on 2 July 1862 that she be cut down one deck and converted to an armoured frigate for the price of £239,258. The ship was launched on 7 March 1864 and commissioned in September 1866, but was not completed until 4 October 1866.

In order to match the French deployment of armored corvettes of the Belliqueuse and Alma classes in the Pacific Ocean the Admiralty ordered Zealous to sail for the west coast of Canada shortly after she was completed. Upon her arrival the ship became the flagship, and reached her operational base at Esquimalt in July 1867 (Esquimalt was the headquarters of the Pacific Station); she remained moored there, at the end of a telegraph link with Britain, until April 1869. During this time her only sea service was for gunnery practice on two days every quarter. In January 1870 she picked up a fresh crew at Panama brought out by the two-decker HMS Revenge. After six years on station she was relieved by Revenge as flagship and started for home. Her bottom had not been cleaned since she had left Great Britain and she could only make a maximum of 7 knots (13 km/h; 8.1 mph) under sail or steam so her return voyage took five months. Zealous struck a rock while sailing through the English Narrows in the southwestern coast of Chile, but was only slightly damaged. She was refitted in Plymouth in April 1873 and then became guard ship at Southampton until 1875, when she was paid off. The ship was placed in reserve in Portsmouth until sold for scrap in September 1886.

As coal was extremely expensive on the West Coast of the Americas, HMS Zealous generally used her sails and covered more miles under sail than any of the other Victorian sailing ironclads, and in her whole career never once travelled in company with another ironclad. She was also the first British ironclad to sail further from Britain than the Mediterranean.
