= Tenedos (Pamphylia) =

Town on the coast of ancient Pamphylia

Coordinates: 36°53′02″N 30°38′51″E

Tenedos (Ancient Greek: Τένεδος) was a fortified coast-town in the west of ancient Pamphylia, 20 stadia to the west of Attalia.

Its site is located on the Arab Su, Turkey.
