= HMS Ocean (1863) =

1860s Prince Consort-class ironclad of the Royal Navy

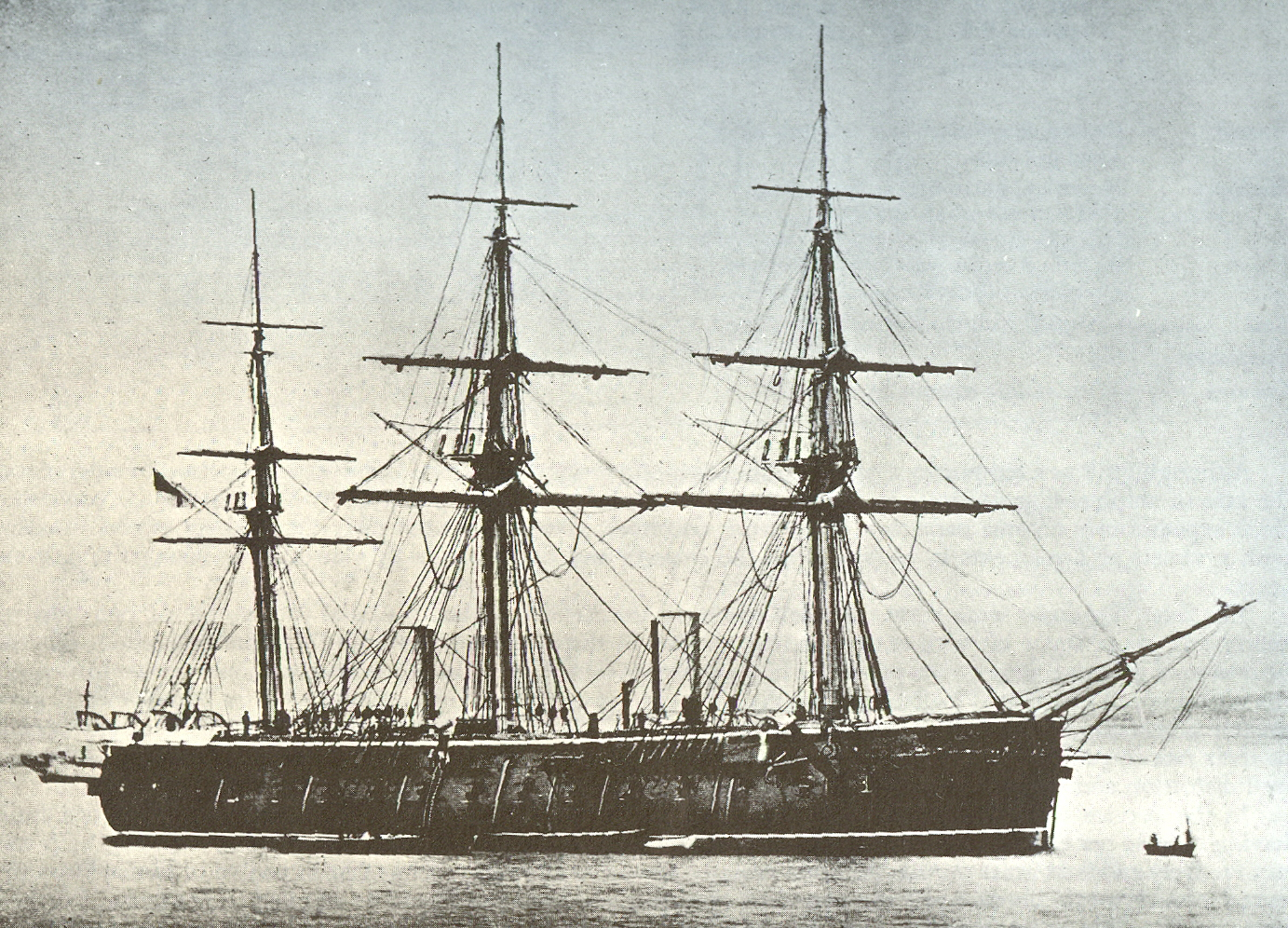
- HMS Ocean in 1868

History

United Kingdom
- Name: HMS Ocean
- Builder: Devonport Dockyard
- Cost: £298,851
- Laid down: 23 August 1860
- Launched: 19 March 1863
- Completed: 6 September 1866
- Commissioned: July 1866
- Decommissioned: June 1872
- Fate: Sold for scrap, 1882

General characteristics
- Class & type: Prince Consort-class armoured frigate
- Displacement: 6,832 long tons (6,942 t)
- Length: 273 ft 1 in (83.2 m)
- Beam: 58 ft 5 in (17.8 m)
- Draught: 27 ft 6 in (8.4 m)
- Installed power: 4,244 ihp (3,165 kW); 8 boilers
- Propulsion: 1 shaft, 1 Horizontal return connecting-rod steam engine
- Sail plan: Barque rig
- Speed: 12 knots (22 km/h; 14 mph)
- Range: 2,000 nmi (3,700 km; 2,300 mi) at 5 knots (9.3 km/h; 5.8 mph)
- Complement: 605
- Armament: 24 × 7-inch rifled muzzle-loading guns
- Armour: Belt: 3–4.5 in (76–114 mm); Battery: 3–4.5 in (76–114 mm)

HMS Ocean was the last of the Royal Navy's four Prince Consort-class ironclads to be completed in the mid-1860s. She was originally laid down as a 91-gun second-rate ship of the line, and was converted during construction to an armoured frigate. The ship spent the bulk of her career on the China Station and served as flagship there for a time. Upon her return to Great Britain in 1872 her hull was found to be partly rotten and she was placed in reserve until she was sold for scrap in 1882.

== Design and description ==
HMS Ocean was 273 feet 1 inch (83.2 m) long between perpendiculars and had a beam of 58 feet 5 inches (17.8 m). The ship had a draught of 24 feet 5 inches (7.4 m) forward and 27 feet 6 inches (8.4 m) aft. She displaced 6,832 long tons (6,942 t).

Ocean had a metacentric height of 6.01 feet (1.83 m) which meant that she rolled a lot and was an unsteady gun platform. Her hull was sheathed with Muntz metal to reduce biofouling. Her crew consisted of 605 officers and ratings.

=== Propulsion ===
Ocean had a simple horizontal 2-cylinder horizontal return connecting-rod steam engine driving a single propeller shaft using steam provided by eight rectangular boilers. The engine produced 4,244 indicated horsepower (3,165 kW) during the ship's sea trials in June 1864 which gave the ship a maximum speed of 12.9 knots (23.9 km/h; 14.8 mph). Ocean carried a maximum of 570 long tons (580 t) of coal, enough to steam 2,000 nautical miles (3,700 km; 2,300 mi) at 5 knots (9.3 km/h; 5.8 mph). She was barque-rigged with three masts and had a sail area of 25,000 square feet (2,300 m^{2}). Her best speed with the propeller disconnected and under sail alone was 11.5 knots (21.3 km/h; 13.2 mph). Yards were added to the ship's mizzenmast by 1866 and Ocean was given a full ship rig which she retained for the rest of her career.

=== Armament ===
Ocean was initially armed with twenty-four seven-inch (178 mm) rifled muzzle-loading guns. Four of these guns were mounted on the upper deck as chase guns, two each fore and aft. The 16-calibre seven-inch gun weighed 6.5 long tons (6.6 t) and fired a 112-pound (50.8 kg) shell. It was credited with the ability to penetrate 7.7 inches (196 mm) of armour. In 1867 four of these guns were replaced by eight-inch (203 mm) rifled muzzle-loaders. The shell of the 15-calibre eight-inch gun weighed 175 pounds (79.4 kg) while the gun itself weighed nine long tons (9.1 t). It had a muzzle velocity of 1,410 ft/s (430 m/s) and was credited with the ability to penetrate 9.6 inches (244 mm) of wrought iron armour at the muzzle.

=== Armour ===
The entire side of the Prince Consort-class ships, from the upper-deck level downwards, was protected by wrought iron armour that tapered from 4.5 inches (114 mm) amidships to 3 inches (76 mm) at the ends. The armour extended 5 feet 6 inches (1.7 m) below the waterline. One small conning tower was fitted on each side of the upper deck amidships, but these proved to be untenable when the ship's guns were fired. The armour was backed by the sides of the ship which were 29.5 inches (749 mm) thick.

== Service history ==
HMS Ocean was laid down on 23 August 1860 as a wooden two-deck, 90-gun ship of the line by Devonport Dockyard. The Admiralty ordered on 5 June 1861 that she be lengthened 23 feet (7.0 m), cut down one deck, and converted to an armoured frigate for the price of £298,851. The ship was launched on 19 March 1863 and commissioned in July 1866, but was not completed until 6 September 1866. Ocean initially served with the Channel Fleet, but she was almost immediately transferred to the Mediterranean, and from there to the Far East; she arrived in Batavia (now Jakarta) on 15 October 1867. She was the only armoured ship ever to double the Cape of Good Hope under canvas alone. During this voyage Ocean set a record in having sailed 243 nautical miles (450 km; 280 mi) on 26 August 1867 with cold boilers, the greatest distance ever covered under sail power by a British ironclad.

Ocean served on the China Station for five years, 1867–1872, without docking once. The ship relieved the old two-decker HMS Rodney as station flagship in 1869 when Vice-Admiral Henry Kellett took command; a new crew was carried out by the 101-gun second rate HMS Donegal and Captain William Hewett, VC, assumed command of the ship. In 1871, Ocean ran down and sunk a large Chinese junk at Amoy. Ocean was relieved in turn by HMS Iron Duke in 1872, but drew too much water to pass through the Suez Canal. The Admiralty therefore ordered that she return home via the Cape of Good Hope using steam. The ship's bottom was very foul and she averaged only 4.5 knots (8.3 km/h) during the voyage. Ocean had lost a lot of sheathing during her time in the Far East and much of her planking was in a bad state. The ship was therefore relegated to dockyard reserve until sold in 1882, to Castle's for breaking up at Charlton. Her stern decoration was sent to Millbank, London, to decorate Castle's yard entrance.
