= HMS Caledonia (1862) =

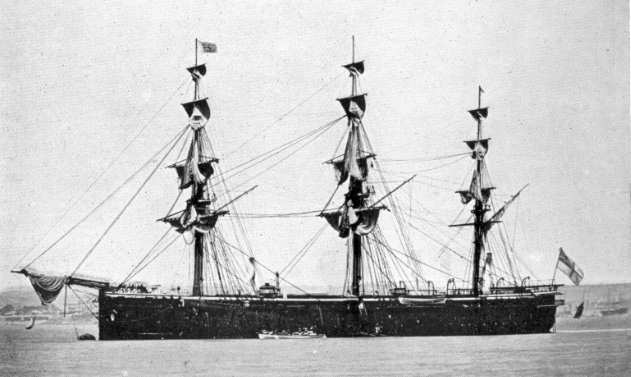
- Caledonia at anchor, after 1866

History

United Kingdom
- Name: Caledonia
- Namesake: Caledonia
- Builder: Woolwich Dockyard
- Laid down: 10 October 1860
- Launched: 24 October 1862
- Completed: July 1865
- Fate: Broken up, 1886

General characteristics
- Class & type: Prince Consort-class ironclad
- Displacement: 6,832 long tons (6,942 t)
- Length: As built : 252 ft (77 m); After 1866 : 273 ft (83 m)
- Beam: As built : 57 ft (17 m); After 1866 : 58 ft 6 in (17.83 m)
- Draught: As built : 25 ft (7.6 m) light; 26 ft 6 in (8.08 m) deep load; After 1866 : 24 ft (7.3 m) light; 26 ft 9 in (8.15 m) deep load
- Propulsion: One-shaft Maudsley horizontal reciprocating; 3,750 ihp (2,796 kW)
- Sail plan: Single-topsail barque, sail area 25,000 sq ft (2,300 m^{2})
- Speed: 12.5 knots (14.4 mph; 23.2 km/h) under power; 11.5 knots (13.2 mph; 21.3 km/h) under sail
- Complement: 605
- Armament: 1865 : 10 × 7 in (180 mm) breech loading Armstrong rifles; 8 × 100-pounder smoothbore; 12 × 68-pounder smoothbore guns; 1867 : 4 × 8 in (200 mm) muzzle-loading rifles; 20 × 7 in (180 mm) muzzle-loading rifles
- Armour: Battery and belt: 4.5 in (110 mm) amidships and 3 in (76 mm) fore and aft

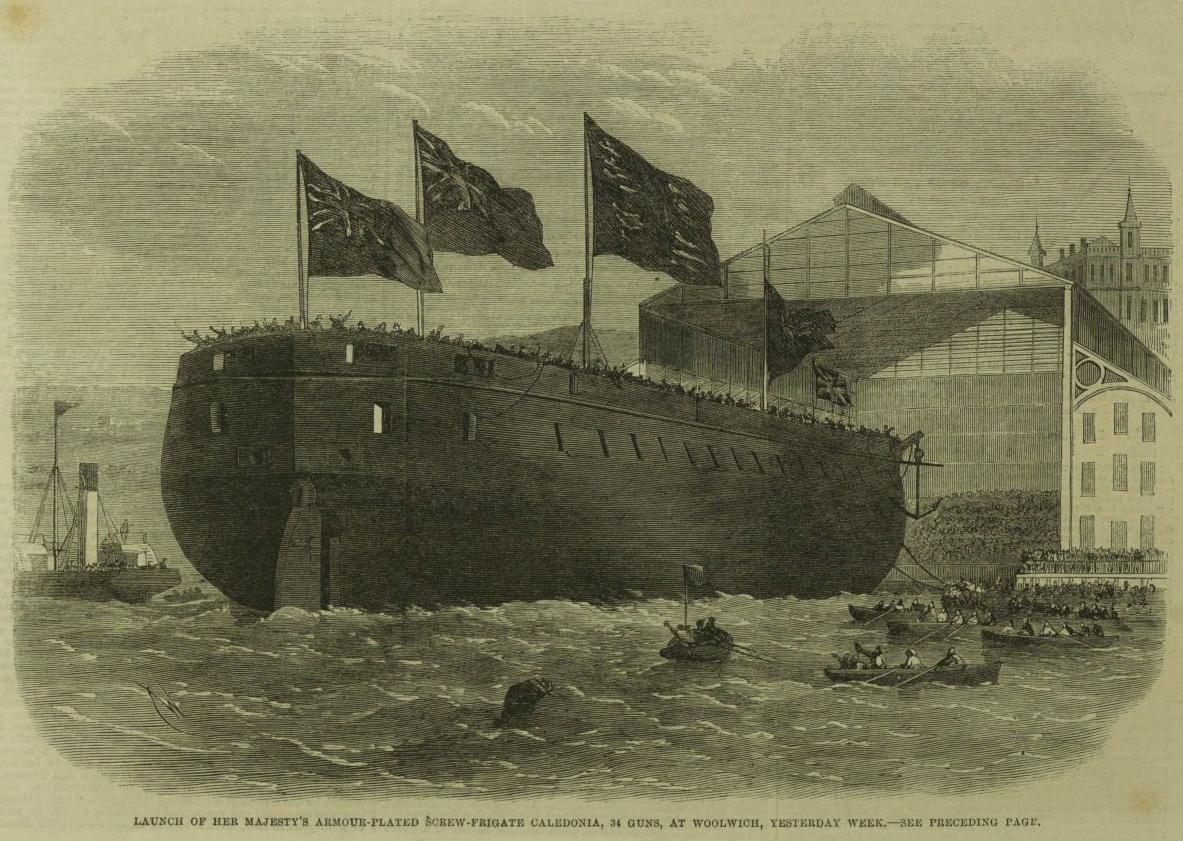
Launch of the armour-plated screw-frigate Caledonia, at Woolwich

HMS Caledonia was a broadside ironclad of the Prince Consort class. Originally laid down as a two-decker steam ship of the line of the Bulwark class, Caledonia was converted on the building stocks into an armoured frigate.

== Service history ==
HMS Caledonia was not completed until July 1865 due to a delay in the delivery of her main armament. Once this was installed, she was commissioned as Second-in-Command of the Mediterranean Fleet, becoming the first ever armoured flagship of the Royal Navy.

She was temporarily withdrawn from service in 1866 for reconstruction which involved the addition of a poop deck. Following this, she was flagship of the Channel Fleet until 1867, when she was paid off for re-armament.

HMS Caledonia was flagship of the Mediterranean Fleet until 1869 (relieving HMS Victoria, the last three-deck Royal Navy flagship) until 1872. In July 1871, she ran aground off Santorini, Greece. She was later refloated and taken in to Malta for repairs. She was a guardship in the Firth of Forth from 1872 until 1875. On 15 June 1873, Caledonia was in collision with the British ship Hogton Tower off St. Alban's Head, Dorset. Hogton Tower was severely damaged at the bows; Caledonia towed her in to Spithead, Hampshire. Caledonia had been serving as a Coastguard vessel at Birkenhead, Cheshire and was sailing to Portsmouth, Hampshire, for a forthcoming inspection of the fleet by the Shah of Persia. She was paid off at Plymouth, and was laid up there until she was sold on 30 September 1886.

== Bibliography ==
- Ballard, G. A. (1980). The Black Battlefleet. Naval Institute Press. ISBN 0-87021-924-3.
- Clowes, William Laird Four Modern Naval Campaigns, Historical Strategical, and Tactical, first published Unit Library, 1902, reprinted Cornmarket Press, 1970.
- Friedman, Norman (2018). British Battleships of the Victorian Era. Naval Institute Press. ISBN 978-1-68247-329-0.
- Lambert, Andrew D. (1984). Battleships in Transition: The Creation of the Steam Battlefleet 1815-1860. Conway Maritime Press. ISBN 0-85177-315-X.
- Parkes, Oscar (1990) [1966]. British Battleships, Warrior 1860 to Vanguard 1950: A History of Design, Construction, and Armament (New & rev. ed.). Naval Institute Press. ISBN 1-55750-075-4.
- Winfield, Rif (2014). British Warships in the Age of Sail 1817–1863: Design, Construction, Careers and Fates. Seaforth Publishing. ISBN 978-1-84832-169-4.
