= HMS Repulse (1868) =

1868 Royal Navy ironclad battleship

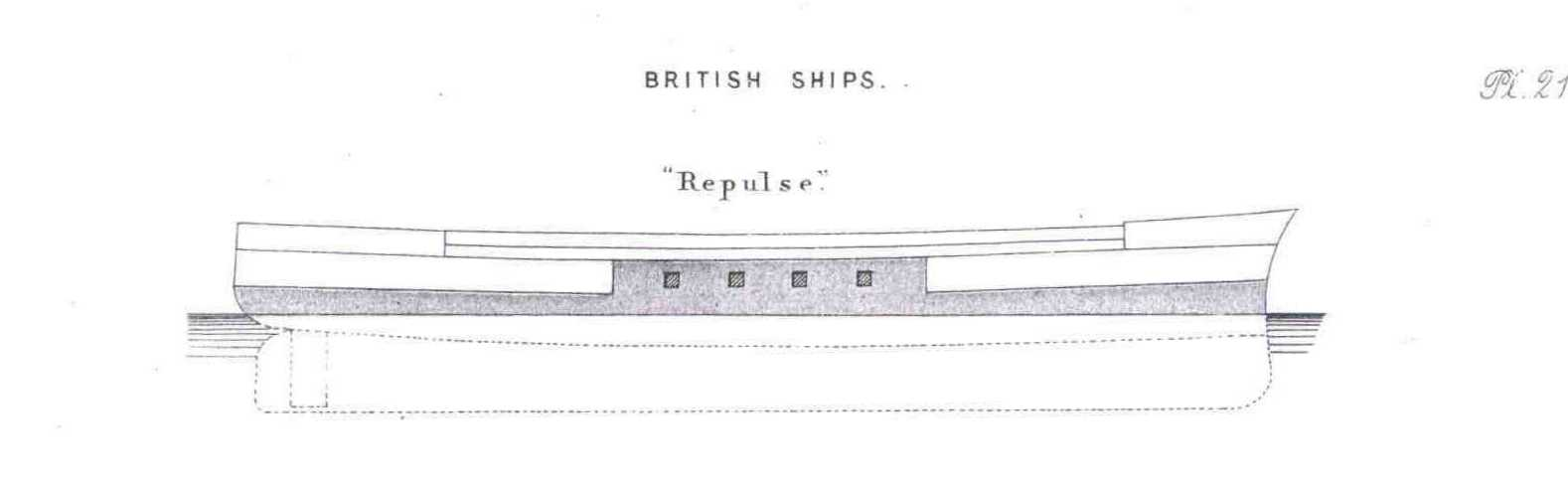
- Right profile of Repulse

History

United Kingdom
- Name: Repulse
- Ordered: 1 April 1857; Reordered, 9 October 1866
- Builder: HM Dockyard, Woolwich
- Laid down: 29 April 1859
- Launched: 25 April 1868
- Completed: 31 January 1870
- Commissioned: 28 February 1870
- Fate: Sold for scrap, February 1889

General characteristics (as completed)
- Type: Central-battery armoured frigate
- Tonnage: 3,734 (bm)
- Displacement: 6,190 long tons (6,290 t)
- Length: 252 ft (76.8 m) (p/p)
- Beam: 59 ft (18 m)
- Draught: 25 ft 10 in (7.9 m)
- Installed power: 6 rectangular fire-tube boilers; 3,347 ihp (2,496 kW)
- Propulsion: 1 shaft; 1 trunk steam engine
- Sail plan: Ship-rigged
- Speed: 12.3 knots (22.8 km/h; 14.2 mph) (under power); 10.5 knots (19.4 km/h; 12.1 mph) (under sail)
- Range: 1,800 nautical miles (3,300 km; 2,100 mi) at 5 knots (9.3 km/h; 5.8 mph)
- Complement: 515
- Armament: 12 × 8 in (203 mm) muzzle-loading rifles
- Armour: Belt: 4.5–6 in (114–152 mm); Battery: 6 in (152 mm); Bulkheads: 4.5 in (114 mm)

HMS Repulse was a wooden-hulled, central-battery ironclad built for the Royal Navy (RN) during the 1860s. She was laid down as a 91-gun, second-rate Bulwark-class ship of the line, but work on the ship was suspended until the performance of earlier conversions from wooden ships of the line to ironclads could be assessed. Construction resumed in 1866 and she was completed in 1870, the last British wooden-hulled battleship to be completed. Repulse was assigned as a guard ship in Scotland for two years before she became the flagship of the Pacific Station in 1872. The ship returned home in 1877 and was placed in reserve upon her arrival. During this voyage, she became the only British ironclad ever to round the Horn under sail. Repulse was re-commissioned in 1881 as a guard ship. She was reduced to reserve in 1885 and sold for scrap in 1889.

== Bulwark-class ship of the line ==
The first four Bulwark-class ships, including Repulse, were ordered in 1856–1857 during an arms race between France and Britain in steam-powered ships of the line. They were based on the 101-gun Duncan class and modified to suit the smaller number of guns. Repulse was the ninth ship of her name to serve in the RN. She was ordered from HM Dockyard, Woolwich on 1 April 1857 and was laid down on 29 April 1859. Approval for conversion into an armoured frigate was given on 14 May 1861, but construction was suspended later that year to gain experience with the other conversions of wooden ships of the line into ironclads first.

The Bulwark class had a length between perpendiculars of 252 feet (76.8 m), a beam of 58 feet (17.7 m), a depth of hold of 25 feet 6 inches (7.8 m) and measured 3,715 62/94 tons burthen. Their armament consisted of thirty-four 8 in (203 mm) shell guns on their lower gun deck and thirty-six 32-pounder (58 cwt) guns (Note: "Cwt" is the abbreviation for hundredweight, 58 cwt referring to the weight of the gun.) on the upper gundeck. Between their forecastle and quarterdeck, they carried twenty 32-pounder (45 cwt) guns and a single 68-pounder (95 cwt) gun. The ships were powered by a two-cylinder, horizontal marine steam engine producing 800 nominal horsepower to drive a single propeller.

== Conversion and description ==
While Repulse sat incomplete on the stocks with her frame seasoning from 1861 to 1866, the technology of guns and armour had advanced significantly. Guns had gotten bigger and heavier, able to penetrate armour thicker than the 4.5 inches (114 mm) that had sufficed for the pioneering broadside ironclad HMS Warrior in 1860. Armour production had improved with thicker plates now able to be rolled. As a ship could only carry a certain weight of armour and guns for her size, Edward Reed, Chief Constructor for the RN, had conceived of the box battery which consolidated most of the guns amidships and reduced the area covered by the armour to just along the waterline and the battery. Repulse was the last British wooden-hulled battleship to be completed.

This central-battery design allowed Reed to give Repulse the best accommodation in the fleet, because the fewer number of guns freed up enough internal space that most officers were able to bunk under an open porthole, which markedly enhanced comfort and habitability in the tropics. The crew's berthing arrangements were also exceptionally capacious. The ship was extremely seaworthy and steered well under both sail and steam. She was a moderately steady gun platform.

Repulse was reordered on 9 October 1866 as a central-battery ironclad and her conversion started on 25 October. Unlike most of the other conversions of the Bulwark-class ships, the short length of the slipway at Woolwich prevented her from having her hull lengthened. The ship's beam slightly increased to 59 feet (18 m). She had a draught of 24 feet 4 inches (7.4 m) forward and 25 feet 10 inches (7.9 m) aft. Her tonnage measured 3,734 tons burthen. She displaced 6,190 long tons (6,290 t).

The ironclad received her 800-nominal-horsepower engine from the 121-gun, first-rate HMS Prince of Wales. It was a horizontal, two-cylinder trunk steam engine built by John Penn and Sons that drove a single two-bladed, 19-foot (5.8 m) screw propeller. This could be hoisted into the hull to reduce drag when under sail. Steam was provided by eight rectangular fire-tube boilers at a working gauge pressure of 20 psi (137.9 kPa; 1.4 kgf/cm^{2}). The engine produced 3,347 indicated horsepower (2,496 kW) during the ship's sea trials on 13 July 1870 which gave her a maximum speed of 12.3 knots (22.8 km/h; 14.2 mph). The ship carried a maximum of 460 long tons (470 t) of coal that gave her a range of 1,800 nautical miles (3,300 km; 2,100 mi) at 5 knots (9.3 km/h; 5.8 mph). She was ship rigged with three masts and had a sail area of 29,200 square feet (2,710 m^{2}). Her best speed with the propeller disconnected and under sail alone was 10.5 knots (19.4 km/h; 12.1 mph).

=== Armament and armour ===
Repulse was armed with a dozen 8-inch (203 mm) rifled muzzle-loading guns. Eight of these were on the main deck amidships, four on each broadside. The remaining four guns were mounted on the upper deck as chase guns, one pair each fore and aft. The 15-calibre 8-inch gun weighed 9 long tons (9.1 t) and fired a 175-pound (79.4 kg) shell at a muzzle velocity of 1,410 feet per second (430 m/s). It was credited with the nominal ability to penetrate 9.6-inch (244 mm) of armour. She was also equipped with two 20-pounder (16 cwt) rifled breech-loaders as saluting guns.

The ship carried 1,043 long tons (1,060 t) of wrought-iron armour; the bulk of it consisted of a complete waterline belt of that was 6 inches (152 mm) thick amidships and reduced to 4.5 inches (114 mm) thick at the bow and stern. It extended 6 feet (1.8 m) below the waterline. The main-deck guns were protected by a box battery with 6-inch armoured sides, 70 feet (21.3 m) long, and 4.5-inch transverse bulkheads at each end which left the chase guns unprotected. The armour was backed by the wooden sides of the ship which were 31 inches (790 mm) thick.

== Construction and career ==
Repulse was launched on 25 April 1868. The ship had to be towed to Sheerness while fitting out for completion later that year as Woolwich's closing was scheduled in 1869. She was completed on 31 January 1870 and Repulse was commissioned by Captain William Rolland on 28 February. The ship was posted to South Queensferry, where she served as guard ship of the First Reserve for the eastern district of Scotland for two years. On 29 August 1871, Repulse ran aground off the Isle of Sheppey, Kent. She was refloated, and was taken to Sheerness the next day. She was subsequently taken to Chatham Dockyard for inspection.

On 9 July 1872, the ship was recommissioned under Captain Charles Curme to serve as the flagship for Rear-Admiral Sir Charles Hillyar, the new Commander-in-Chief, Pacific Station, relieving HMS Zealous. Repulse then patrolled the seas from Patagonia to British Columbia for the next five years. She was relieved by the cruiser HMS Shah in 1877; in coming home Captain Frederick Wilson decided not to pass through the Straits of Magellan under steam - which was the shorter route - but to round Cape Horn under sail. The trip from the Pacific to Rio de Janeiro, Brazil, took her seven weeks; she was the only British ironclad ever to round the Horn under canvas. Naval historian and Royal Navy officer Admiral George Ballard states that the ship's captain was certified insane by the ship's doctor during the voyage and was put ashore at Rio de Janeiro.

Repulse was paid off into the reserve on 12 June and began a long refit from 1877 to 1880. The ship was rearmed with ten RML 9-inch 12-ton gun|9-inch (229 mm) rifled muzzle-loading guns and was fitted with mounts for a pair of second-class, 60-foot (18 m) torpedo boats, but these were never carried by her. She also received four carriages for 16-inch (406 mm) Whitehead torpedoes and twelve torpedoes for them in 1880. Repulse was recommissioned on 15 April 1881 to serve as the guard ship for the First Reserve in the Humber. Captain Henry St John assumed command on 14 April 1884, although the ship was reduced to the Fourth Reserve on 26 August 1885. An 1886 inventory showed six 20-pounder rifled breech-loaders, six 4-barrel, 1-inch (25 mm) Nordenfelt guns and two 5-barrel, .45-inch (11 mm) Gardner guns. Repulse remained in reserve until sold in February 1889. She covered more distance under sail alone than any British ironclad except Zealous.
