= Duncan-class ship of the line (1859) =

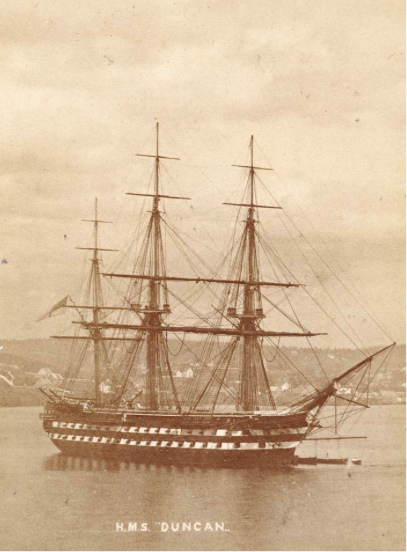
- HMS Duncan, Halifax, Nova Scotia c. 1865

Class overview
- Name: Duncan class
- Operators: Royal Navy
- Preceded by: Conqueror class
- Succeeded by: Bulwark class
- Built: 1855–1861
- In service: 1863–1870
- Planned: 2
- Completed: 2
- Scrapped: 2

General characteristics
- Class & type: Duncan class
- Type: 101-gun screw two-decker
- Displacement: 5,950 long tons
- Tons burthen: 3,715 Builder's Old Measurement
- Length: 252 ft 0 in (76.81 m) overall; 213 ft 9.25 in (65.1574 m) keel-line
- Beam: 58 ft 0 in (17.68 m) extreme
- Draught: Gibraltar (not masted or stores) 18 ft 0 in (5.49 m) forward, 22 ft 6 in (6.86 m) aft
- Depth of hold: 25 ft 6 in (7.77 m)
- Installed power: Duncan (Penn) 3428 ihp; Gibraltar (Maudslay) 3494 ihp
- Propulsion: 800 nhp
- Sail plan: Main mast: 67 ft 0 in (20.42 m)ft × 0 ft 40 in (1.02 m); Fore mast: 61 ft 0 in (18.59 m)ft × 0 ft 37 in (0.94 m); Mizzen mast: 51 ft 6 in (15.70 m)ft × 0 ft 27 in (0.69 m)
- Speed: Duncan 13.338 knots (24.702 km/h) trials Stokes Bay 7 August 1860; Gibraltar 12.48 knots (23.11 km/h) (not masted or stored) trials Plymouth 17 April 1861
- Complement: 930
- Armament: Gun Deck: 36 × 8in/65cwt; Main deck: 36 × 32-pounder/56cwt; Upper Deck: 28 × 32-pounder/42cwt, 1 × 68-pounder 95 cwt
- Notes: Source: Lambert Battleships in Transition

The Duncan class of 101-gun two-decker steam line-of-battle ships are considered by Professor Andrew Lambert to have been the "final statement of the British design progress" for steam two-deckers. The class consisted of HMS Duncan and HMS Gibraltar. The Bulwark class had identical hulls. HMS Gibraltar was the last wooden steam line-of-battleship to commission as a private ship in the Royal Navy.

== Design ==
The first British steam 101-gun two-decker was the St Jean d'Acre, which was ordered and laid down in 1851 and was "the first ship that can be directly attributed to Sir Baldwin Walker's influence. [She was] an expansion of the Agamemnon [91-guns], her superior qualities were developed in the succeeding Conqueror and Duncan classes of 101-gun ships." The Duncan class were longer and broader versions of the Conqueror, which was a success as they were noticeably faster (see table below).

"The early steam battleships, such as the 230-foot (70 m) Agamemnon, combined a measure of speed under sail or steam with similar manoeuvring powers to the sailing ships. This persuaded Walker to try even longer hulls, the Renown being drawn out to 244 feet 9 inches (74.60 m) and the Bulwark to 252 feet (77 m). While the post-war ships, from their greater length and finer lines, reached higher speeds they did so at the expense of the facility and precision of their response to the helm. New ships such as the Donegal, 101 and Renown, 91 were considered slow in their stays. This lack of handiness was emphasised by their operating in company with older ships such the St Jean d'Acre, 101 and James Watt, 91 which lacked speed, but tacked and wore far more easily. Lord Auckland had anticipated this problem in 1847."

Duncan and Gibraltar "presented a very different appearance from the Baroque splendour of the early Eighteenth Century, with their regular outline bereft of almost all embellishment beyond the elliptical stern gallery and the figurehead and painted in the severe black and white bands of the era. These were the most striking and intimidating of all wooden warships, replacing elegance with majesty. As such they were fitting precursors for the industrial architecture of the iron-clads."

	Agamemnon 91-guns	St Jean d'Acre 101-guns	Conqueror class 101-guns	Duncan class 101-guns
Tonnage (B.O.M.)	3,085 tons	3,200 tons	3,224 tons	3,715 tons
Displacement	4,614 long tons	5,499 long tons	5,720 long tons	5,950 long tons
Overall length	230 ft 3 in (70.18 m)	238 ft (73 m)	240 ft (73 m)	252 ft (77 m)
Keel length	193 ft 3 in (58.90 m)	202 ft 5 in (61.70 m)	204 ft 10 in (62.43 m)	213 ft 9.25 in (65.1574 m)
Breadth (extreme)	55 ft 4 in (16.87 m)	55 ft 4 in (16.87 m)	55 ft 4 in (16.87 m)	58 ft (18 m)
Depth in hold	24 ft 6 in (7.47 m)	25 ft (7.6 m)	24 ft 5 in (7.44 m)	25 ft 6 in (7.77 m)
Engines (nhp)	600	600	800	800
Engines (ihp)	2,268	2,136	Conqueror – 2,812 Donegal – 3,103	Duncan – 3,428 Gibraltar – 3,494
Speed under steam (kts)	11.243	11.199	Conqueror – 10.806 Donegal – 11.912	Duncan – 13.338 Gibraltar** – 12.48

** Note that Gibraltar's trial speed was undertaken without masts or stores.

Source: Lambert

== Key dates ==
The following table shows key dates for the Duncan class.

Ship	Builder	Ordered	Laid Down	Launched	Trials	Commissioned	Last in Commission as Sea-Going Ship	Sold
Duncan	Portsmouth	29 November 1856	2 May 1857	3 December 1859	7 August 1860	6 January 1864	28 February 1870	11 October 1910
Gibraltar	Devonport	3 March 1855	October 1858	16 August 1860	17 April 1861	8 September 1863	12 January 1867	16 March 1899

== Career HMS Duncan ==
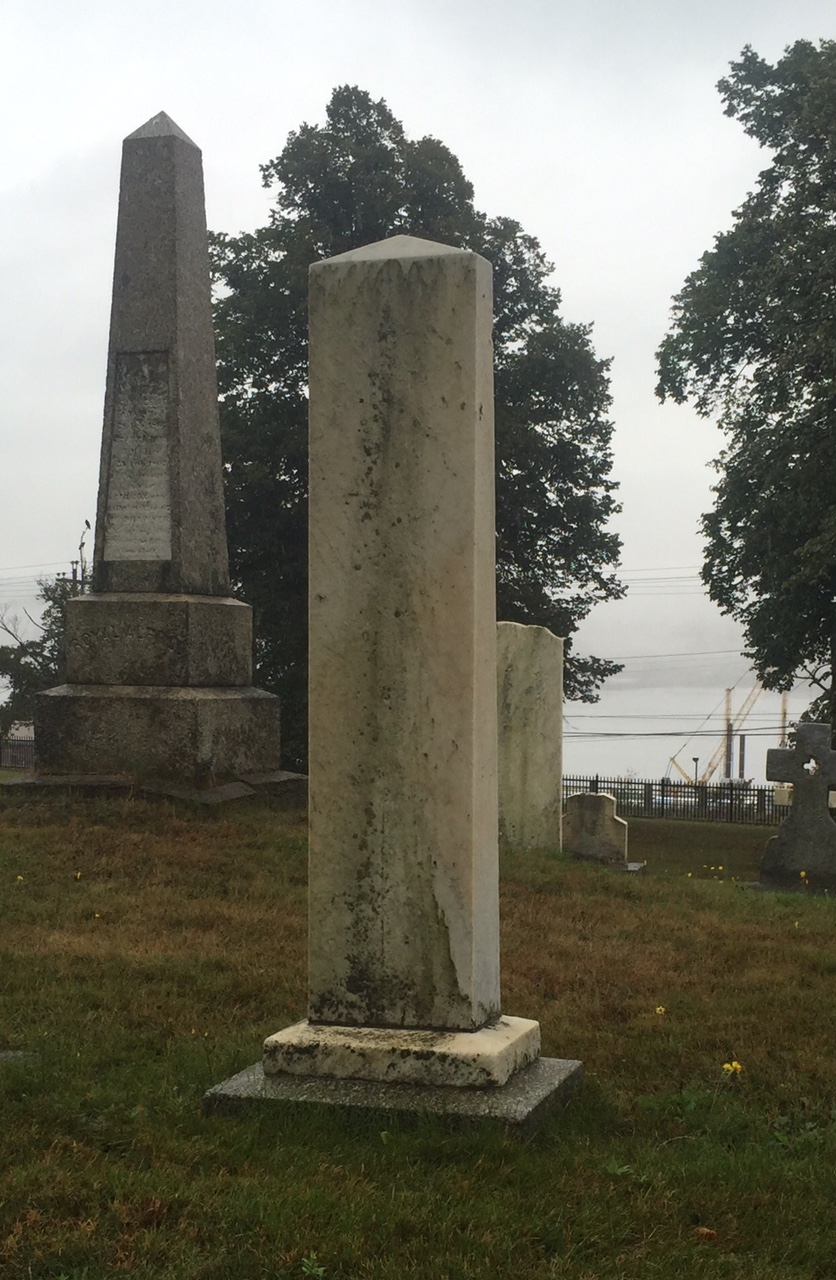
Monument to the 5 crew that died of HMS Duncan at Halifax, Royal Navy Burying Ground (Halifax, Nova Scotia)

10 February 1862: Reduction in the number of guns carried in peacetime to 89.

6 January 1864: Commanded by Captain Robert Gibson, flagship of Vice-Admiral James Hope, North America and West Indies.

Whilst serving on the North America and West Indies Station, Captain John Bythesea VC was carried on the books of Duncan as second captain from 1 April 1866 to Spring 1867, for special service as Naval Attaché in Washington.

15 June 1867 – 10 September 1867: Commanded by Captain George Hancock, Coast Guard, Leith (Queensferry) (replacing Trafalgar).

10 September 1867 – 28 February 1870: Commanded (until paying off) by Captain Charles Fellowes, Coast Guard, Leith (and flagship of Commodore of John Walker Tarleton's Coast Guard squadron comprising Duncan, Donegal, Revenge, Irresistible, Lion, Dauntless and Argus). HMS Repulse replaced Duncan as Coast Guard, Queensferry by 20 August 1870.

1 April 1873 – 1 January 1875: Commanded by Captain George Willes Watson, Sheerness, replacing Pembroke.

1 January 1875: Commanded by Captain Charles Thomas Curme, flagship of Vice-Admiral George Fowler Hastings, Sheerness.

From some time in 1878 – 1 January 1879: Commanded by Captain Thomas Bridgeman Lethbridge, Sheerness.

1 January 1879 – 27 July 1881: Commanded by Captain Thomas Baker Martin Sulivan, Sheerness. Tenders: Hydra, Porcupine, Trent and Wildfire.

27 July 1881 – 31 December 1881: Commanded (until paying off at Sheerness) by Captain John D'Arcy, Sheerness (replaced by the Naval Barracks at Sheerness, renamed Duncan, but retained with a small crew as "saluting ship").

In 1890 she was Chatham. Machinery probably removed. That year she was listed as harbour service and renamed Pembroke.

1895: Receiving ship, Chatham.

September 1905: was renamed Tenedos II, and commissioned in January 1906 as part of the new "Tenedos" training establishment for boy mechanician apprentices.

11 October 1910 On closure of the "Tenedos" establishment, sold to Castle Shipbreakers for breaking up at London for £7,525.

== Career HMS Gibraltar ==
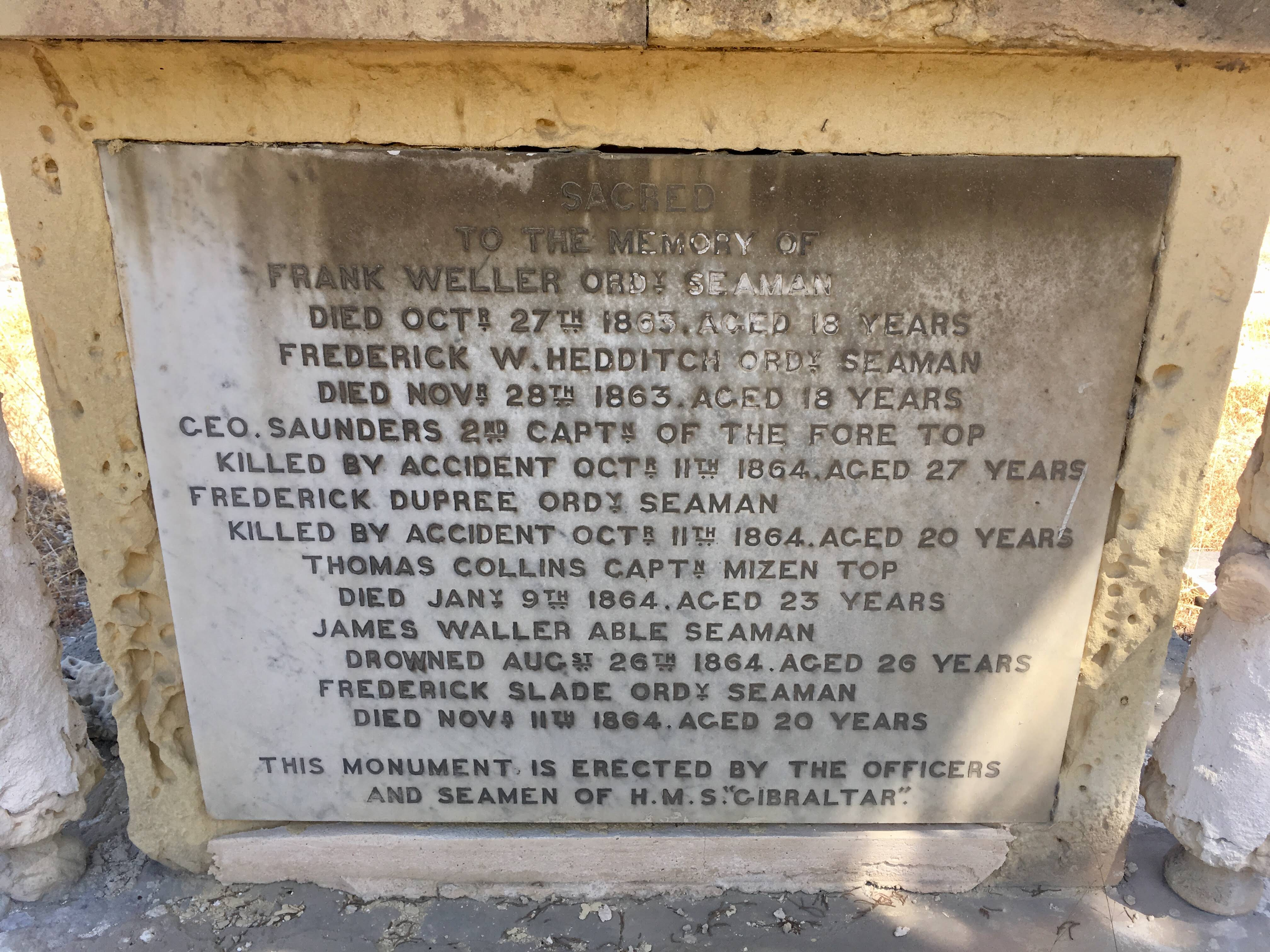
Memorial to seamen of HMS Gibraltar at Ta' Braxia Cemetery, Malta in August 2019

8 September 1863 – December 1864: Commanded (from commissioning at Plymouth) by Captain James Charles Prevost, Mediterranean Fleet.

December 1864 – 12 January 1867: Commanded (until paying off at Plymouth) by Captain Robert Coote, Mediterranean Fleet.

1871 onwards: Lent to the Belfast Training Ship Committee as training ship for boys in Belfast.

1889: renamed Grampian.

16 March 1899: Sold to Henry Castle & Sons for breaking up at Charlton.
