= HMS Penelope (1867) =

British central-battery ironclad

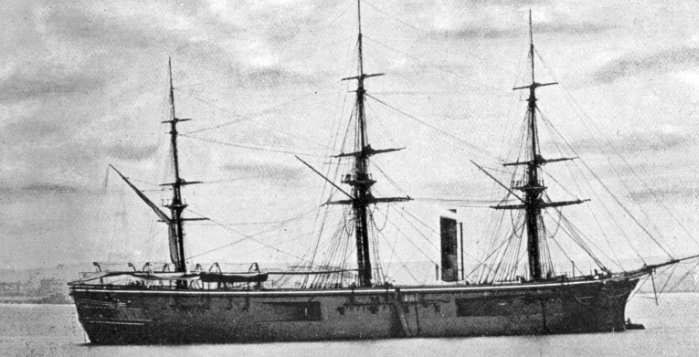
- Penelope at anchor

Class overview
- Preceded by: HMS Bellerophon
- Succeeded by: HMS Hercules
- Completed: 1
- Scrapped: 1

History

United Kingdom
- Name: Penelope
- Namesake: Penelope
- Ordered: February 1865
- Builder: Pembroke Dockyard
- Cost: £196,789
- Laid down: 4 September 1865
- Launched: 18 June 1867
- Completed: 27 June 1868
- Fate: Sold for scrap, 12 July 1912

General characteristics
- Displacement: 4,394 long tons (4,465 t)
- Length: 260 ft (79.2 m) (pp)
- Beam: 50 ft (15.2 m)
- Draught: 16 ft 9 in (5.1 m)
- Installed power: 4 boilers; 4,763 ihp (3,552 kW)
- Propulsion: 2 shafts; 2 horizontal-return connecting-rod steam engines
- Sail plan: Ship-rigged
- Speed: 12 knots (22 km/h; 14 mph)
- Range: 1,370 nmi (2,540 km; 1,580 mi) at 10 knots (19 km/h; 12 mph)
- Complement: 350
- Armament: 8 × RML 8 in (203 mm) rifled muzzle-loading guns; 3 × RBL 5 in (127 mm) rifled breech-loading guns; 2 × RBL 20-pdr 3.75 in (95 mm) saluting guns
- Armour: Waterline belt: 6–5 in (152–127 mm); Box battery: 6 in (152 mm); Bulkheads: 4.5 in (114 mm)

HMS Penelope was a central-battery ironclad built for the Royal Navy in the late 1860s and was rated as an armoured corvette. She was designed for inshore work with a shallow draught, and this severely compromised her performance under sail. Completed in 1868, the ship spent the next year with the Channel Fleet before she was assigned to the First Reserve Squadron in 1869 and became the coast guard ship for Harwich until 1887. Penelope was mobilised as tensions with Russia rose during the Russo-Turkish War of 1877–78 and participated in the Bombardment of Alexandria during the Anglo-Egyptian War of 1882. The ship became a receiving ship in South Africa in 1888 and then a prison hulk in 1897. She was sold for scrap in 1912.

== Design ==
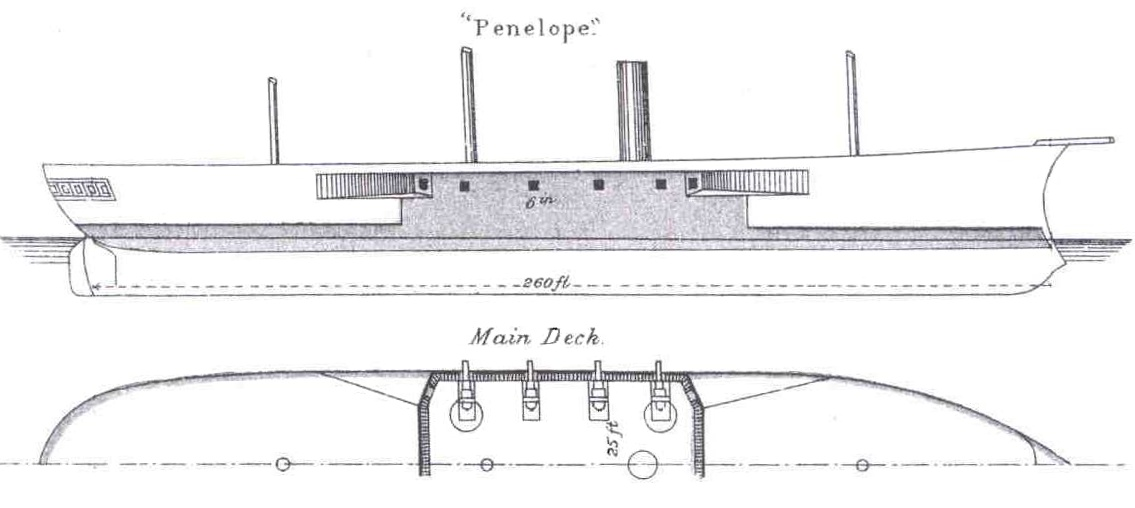
Right elevation and half-plan from Brassey's Naval Annual, 1888

The chief constructor, Sir Edward Reed, was ill, so the design of this ship was entrusted to his assistant and brother-in-law, Nathaniel Barnaby, himself a future chief constructor. For reasons that have not survived, the Admiralty required that Penelope to be a ship of unusually shallow draught, possibly in light of the operations in the shallow Baltic Sea during the Crimean War of 1854–1855.

The ship was 260 feet (79.2 m) long between perpendiculars and had a beam of 50 feet (15.2 m). She had a draught of 15 feet 9 inches (4.8 m) forward and 17 feet 4 inches (5.3 m) aft. Penelope displaced 4,394 long tons (4,465 t) and had a tonnage of 3,096 tons burthen. She had a complement of 350 officers and ratings. She was the first British capital ship to be fitted with a washroom.

Penelope had a pair of Maudslay three-cylinder, horizontal-return, connecting-rod steam engines, each driving a single 14-foot (4.3 m) propeller. The engines used steam provided by four boilers with a working pressure of 30.5 psi (210 kPa; 2 kgf/cm^{2}). The ship reached a speed of 12.76 knots (23.63 km/h; 14.68 mph) from 4,703 indicated horsepower (3,507 kW) during her sea trials on 1 July 1868. She carried a maximum of 500 tons of coal, enough to steam 1,360 nautical miles (2,520 km; 1,570 mi) at 10 knots (19 km/h; 12 mph).

The shallow-draught requirement forced Barnaby to build her with twin screws, as a single screw of larger diameter would have been mounted insufficiently deep to be effective. The Admiralty also wanted hoistable propellers as the reports from Pallas and Favorite, with their fixed propellers, were distinctly uncomplimentary about their sailing qualities. She was the only twin-screw ship ever to have hoisting screws. Provision for the hoisting frames and twin rudders forced a very unusual shape to the stern, which unintentionally greatly increased drag. The other issue was that the shallowness of her draught made her very unhandy under sail, and she was described as "drifting to leeward in a wind like a tea tray". Penelope was ship-rigged with three masts and a sail area of 18,250 square feet (1,695 m^{2}). Her speed under sail alone was only 8.5 knots (15.7 km/h; 9.8 mph). Her shallow draught gave her a metacentric height of 2.7 feet (0.8 m) at deep load, which made her a very steady gun platform.

Penelope's main armament of eight rifled muzzle-loading (RML) 8-inch (203 mm) guns was concentrated amidships in a box battery. The guns at the corners of the battery were given additional gun ports, embrasured into the sides of the hull, to give her a limited amount of end-on fire. The shell of the 8-inch gun weighed 175 pounds (79.4 kg) and was rated with the ability to penetrate 9.6 inches (244 mm) of wrought-iron armour. The ship mounted three rifled breech-loading (RBL) 5-inch (127 mm) Armstrong guns as chase guns, one in the stern and two under the forecastle in the bow, although these were judged to be very ineffective weapons. She also carried a pair of RBL 20-pounder 3.75-inch (95 mm) Armstrong saluting guns.

The waterline wrought iron armour belt of Penelope covered her entire length. It was 6 inches (152 mm) thick amidships, backed by 10–11 inches (254–279 mm) of wood, and thinned to 5 inches towards the ends of the ship. It had a total height of 5 feet 6 inches (1.7 m), of which 4 feet (1.2 m) was below water and 1 foot 6 inches (0.5 m) above. The sides of the 68-foot-long (20.7 m) box battery were also 6 inches thick, and its ends were protected by 4.5-inch (114 mm) bulkheads. Between the battery and the belt was a 96-foot-long (29 m) strake of 6-inch armour, also closed off by 4.5-inch bulkheads.

== Construction and career ==
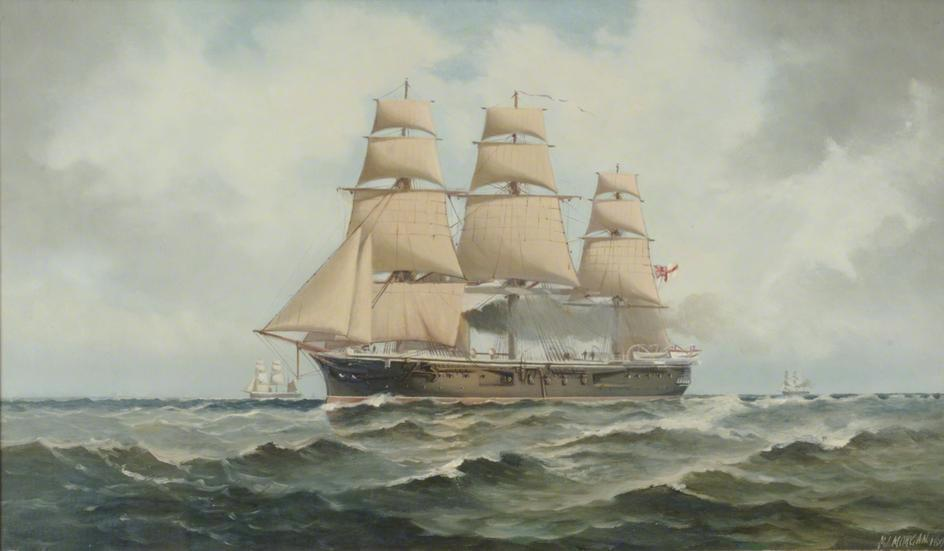
A painting of Penelope under sail by Henry Morgan

Penelope, named after the wife of Odysseus, was the fifth ship of her name to serve in the Royal Navy. She was ordered in February 1865 and was the first iron-hulled ship to be built at Pembroke Dockyard. The ship was laid down on 4 September and was launched by the wife of the new captain-superintendent of the dockyard, Captain Robert Hall, on 18 June 1867.

Penelope was completed at Devonport Dockyard on 27 June 1868 for the cost of £196,789 and served in the Channel Fleet until June 1869. She was then guard ship at Harwich until 1882, which included summer cruises in company with the rest of the reserve fleet. On 7 January 1876, the German merchant ship Victoria ran into her at Harwich, causing minor damage. She was part of the Particular Service Squadron mobilised during the Russian war scare of June–August 1878. On 18 January 1881, she was driven from her moorings at Harwich and ran aground in the River Stour.

In 1882, she was at Gibraltar under command of Captain St George Caulfield D'Arcy-Irvine when the Anglo-Egyptian War began, and her shallow draught caused her to be sent to Egypt. Upon arrival in Alexandria, she assisted with the evacuation of European refugees for several days before the bombardment of the city began on 11 July. Penelope was the ship closest to the Egyptian forts and fired 231 rounds during the battle. The ship was only lightly damaged by Egyptian shells, with eight men wounded, one eight-inch gun damaged and one mainyard needing to be replaced. She became Rear-Admiral Anthony Hoskins's flagship when the British seized the Suez Canal to allow their troop transports to land at Ismailia.

On 11 March 1883, Penelope was run into by the steam collier Dunelm at Sheerness, sustaining minor damage. Penelope returned home after the war for a further five years' service at Harwich. She was paid off in 1887, refitted, and sent to Simonstown, South Africa, as a receiving ship the following year. In January 1897, Penelope was converted to a prison hulk and then sold for scrap on 12 July 1912 for the price of £1,650. The ship was broken up at Genoa, Italy, in 1914.
