= HMS Triumph (1870) =

Swiftsure-class ironclad battleship

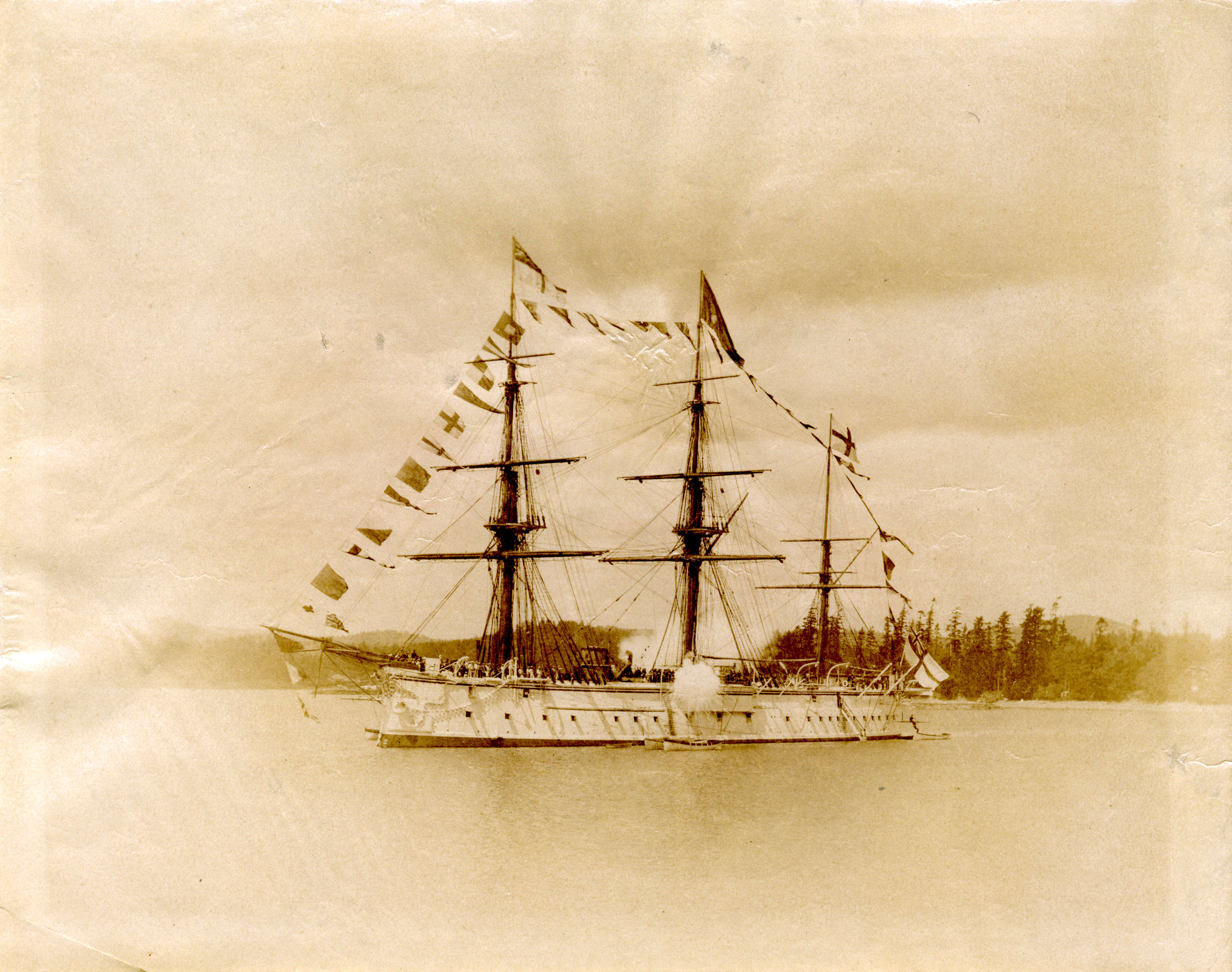
- Triumph dressed, most likely on the occasion of the official opening of the Canadian Pacific Railway in Vancouver harbour in 1887

History

United Kingdom
- Name: Triumph
- Builder: Palmers, Jarrow
- Laid down: 31 August 1868
- Launched: 27 September 1870
- Completed: 8 April 1873
- Renamed: Tenedos, 21 March 1904; Indus IV, 1912; Algiers, January 1915
- Reclassified: As a depot ship, 24 June 1901; As a training ship, 1906; As a storeship, October 1914
- Fate: Sold for scrap, 7 January 1921

General characteristics (as built)
- Class & type: Swiftsure-class ironclad
- Displacement: 6,640 long tons (6,750 t)
- Length: 280 ft (85.3 m) (p/p)
- Beam: 55 ft (16.8 m)
- Draught: 25 ft (7.6 m)
- Installed power: 6 rectangular fire-tube boilers; 5,114 ihp (3,814 kW)
- Propulsion: 1 shaft; HRCR steam engine
- Sail plan: Ship-rigged
- Speed: 13.5 knots (25.0 km/h; 15.5 mph) (steam); 12.5 knots (23.2 km/h; 14.4 mph) (sail)
- Range: 1,680 nmi (3,110 km; 1,930 mi) at 10 knots (19 km/h; 12 mph)
- Complement: 450
- Armament: 10 × 9 in (229 mm) muzzle-loading rifles; 4 × 6 in (152 mm) muzzle-loading rifles; 6 × 20 pdr (3.75 in (95 mm)) saluting guns
- Armour: Waterline belt: 6–8 in (152–203 mm); Box battery: 4–6 in (102–152 mm); Bulkheads: 4–5 in (102–127 mm)

HMS Triumph was a central-battery Swiftsure-class ironclad built for the Royal Navy (RN) during the 1870s. The ship was completed in 1873 and was briefly assigned to the Channel Fleet before being transferred to the Mediterranean Fleet where she spent most of the rest of the decade. Together with her sister Swiftsure, she had a minor role in returning a captured pair of rebel ships during the Spanish Cantonal Rebellion in 1873 to the central government. Triumph was the first of the sisters to serve as the Pacific Station flagship beginning in 1878 and they rotated the assignment between them at roughly three-year intervals. In between those times, they were usually refitted and spent several years in reserve. When the Pacific Fleet assignments ended for Triumph in 1888, she spent a few years in reserve before serving as a guardship in Ireland, flagship of the local reserve forces.

Triumph was assigned to serve as a depot ship in 1901 and was renamed Tenedos in 1904. She was converted into a mechanics training ship that same year and was renamed Indus IV in 1912. Two years later the ship was converted into a storeship and was renamed Algiers in 1915. The old ironclad was sold for scrap in 1921.

== Background and description ==
The Swiftsure class was intended to serve on the Pacific Station where coal was very expensive so the ships' sailing qualities had to be equal to their performance under steam, while at the same time being stable ships and good gun platforms. The ships were 280 feet (85.3 m) long between perpendiculars, had a beam of 55 feet (16.8 m) and a draught of 25 feet (7.6 m). Triumph displaced 6,640 long tons (6,750 t) and had a tonnage of 3,893 tons burthen. They had a complement of 450 officers and ratings.

The ships were fitted wuth a single two-cylinder, horizontal-return, connecting-rod steam engine built by Maudslay, Sons and Field that was rated at 800 nominal horsepower. It drove the shaft of the 23-foot-6-inch (7.16 m) propeller using steam provided by six rectangular fire-tube boilers. Triumph reached a speed of 13.5 knots (25.0 km/h; 15.5 mph) from 5,114 indicated horsepower (3,814 kW) during her sea trials. She carried 550 long tons (560 t) of coal to give them ranges of 1,680 nautical miles (3,110 km; 1,930 mi) at 10 knots (19 km/h; 12 mph).

The Swiftsure class was initially ship-rigged with three masts and had a sail area of 32,900 square feet (3,060 m^{2}), excluding stunsails. Around 1877–1878 they were re-rigged as barques with their sail area reduced to 22,750 square feet (2,114 m^{2}). To reduce drag, the funnel was telescopic and could be lowered and the propeller could be hoisted into the hull. Under sail alone, they could reach 12.5 knots (23.2 km/h; 14.4 mph).

=== Armament and armour ===
The main battery of the Swiftsure-class ships consisted of 10 RML 9-inch (229 mm) rifled muzzle-loading guns with the guns positioned amidships in a central-battery configuation just like that of the Audacious-class ships. Six of these were positioned on the main deck, three on each broadside, and the other four guns were mounted on the corners of the upper deck box battery. The battery protruded over the sides of the ships to give the guns a certain amount of end-on fire. The ships were also equipped with four RML six-inch (152 mm) (71 cwt) (Note: "Cwt" is the abbreviation for hundredweight, 71 cwt referring to the weight of the gun.) guns as chase guns, two in the bow and another pair in the stern. They also had six RBL 20-pounder (3.75 in (95 mm)) rifled breech-loading guns that were used as saluting guns.

In 1880–1882, the ships received four 14-inch (356 mm) torpedo launchers on the main deck, two on each broadside; in 1882 the six-inch guns were replaced by four breech-loading BL five-inch (127 mm) guns in Triumph. Triumph retained her RBL 20-pounder guns through 1886, although they had been repurposed as anti-torpedo boat guns. At that time the ship also had four quick-firing (QF) six-pounder (57 mm (2.2 in)) Hotchkiss guns, eight four-barrel 1-inch (25 mm) guns, and four five-barrel Gardner guns. By 1890 the 20 pounders had been removed as had all the guns smaller than the six pounders. The ship's anti-torpedo boat battery consisted of mix of six- and QF three-pounder (47 mm (1.9 in)) guns, eight of each type.

The armour scheme of the Swiftsures was identical to that of the Audacious class with the wrought-iron, waterline armour belt covering the entire length of the ships. It was eight inches (203 mm) thick amidships, backed by eight to ten inches (203 to 254 mm) of teak, and thinned to six inches towards the ends of the ships. It only protected the main deck and reached 4 feet (1 m) above the waterline at full load and 3 feet (0.9 m) below. The main deck citadel's ends were protected by a five-inch (127 mm) forward bulkhead and a four-inch one aft. The sides and embrasures of the upper battery were six inches thick, but its ends were unprotected. The bridge was fitted with a one-man conning tower with walls three inches (76 mm) thick.

== Construction and career ==
HMS Triumph was the seventh ship of her name to serve in the RN. Ordered in 1868 from Palmers Shipbuilding and Iron Company, the ship was laid down at the company's shipyard at Jarrow on 31 August 1868 and launched on 27 September 1870. On 28 November, whilst fitting out, she was severely damaged by fire. As a result, Triumph was not completed until 8 April 1873. She was initially commissioned by Captain John McCrea in March 1873 for the Channel Fleet, but was transferred after a short time to the Mediterranean. In early 1873, the First Spanish Republic was beset with the Cantonal Revolution. A rebel faction of the Spanish Navy had seized four of the country's ironclads and the central government declared them to be pirates on 20 July. The ironclad Vitoria and the frigate Almansa were forced to surrender by Swiftsure and a German ironclad in early August. After their crews were released, the rebel ships were subsequently escorted by the sisters to Gibraltar where they were turned over to the central government on 26 September.

On 1 March 1877, she collided with the steamship Benjamin Whitworth but was not damaged. After the inconclusive Battle of Pacocha in May between two unarmored British ships, including the flagship of the Pacific Station, the frigate HMS Shah, and the rebel Peruvian ironclad Huáscar, the RN decided to move forward Triumph's already planned relief of Shah and the ship replaced her in May 1878. On 21 November 1881, while Triumph was off Chile, an explosion occurred that killed three men and wounding seven. It was caused by a drying compound called "xerotine siccative", also called a patent drier. (Note: "xerotine", from Greek ξηρός (xēros, "dry") and "siccative", from Latin siccus ("dry, sober") both meaning "drying compound". Xerotine siccative is a compound added to paint in order to thicken the oil and speed the drying process. It consisted of a very "volatile petroleum product." It is a terebene, a series of hydrocarbons produced from oil of turpentine and sulphuric acid. At the time, "patent driers" were used between the metal and wooden hulls in order to prevent corrosion.)

She was relieved by Swiftsure in October 1882. Triumph returned to Portsmouth, where she was refitted, receiving new boilers and launching rails for torpedoes. The ship served as Pacific flagship from January 1885 until December 1888, her relief at that time by Swiftsure signalling the end of her foreign service. Returning home, she was for a short time in reserve at Devonport, and was then flagship of the Senior Officer on the Coast of Ireland at Queenstown (modern Cobh) between February 1890 and September 1892. She returned to the reserve at Devonport, where she remained until July 1900.

Triumph was disarmed before she was reclassified as a depot ship for torpedo boat destroyers at Devonport on 24 June 1901, although funding to convert the ship to provide the required accommodations, amenities, maintenance assets and distilled water was not made available for several years. Captain Arthur William Edward Prothero was appointed in command on 11 July 1902, for command of Fleet Reserve at Devonport, but the appointment was cancelled and Captain Cecil Thursby was appointed instead on 16 July 1902. In September that year it was announced that her engines and boilers would be removed, and the vessel converted into a hulk. In the event, her propulsion machinery had been removed by February 1904 and her full conversion was completed by the end of the year.

On 21 March 1904, the ship was renamed Tenedos to release her name for the predreadnought battleship HMS Triumph then under construction. The ship was paid off on 28 February 1905 and was subsequently towed to HM Dockyard, Chatham to serve as the core of the navy's mechanical training establishment (MTE) there. The RN decided that Chatham was too crowded to accommodate the ships and transferred the former Triumph to return to Devonport and join the MTE there in 1910, although the ship was not renamed Indus IV until 1912. After the First World War began in August 1914, she was towed to Invergordon in October to serve as a storeship and was renamed Algiers in January 1915. After the war, she was sold for scrap on 7 January 1921.

== Bibliography ==
- Ballard, G. A. (1948). "British Central-Battery Ships: Swiftsure and Triumph". Mariner's Mirror. 34 (2): 98–111. doi:10.1080/00253359.1948.10657514. ISSN 2049-680X.
- Clowes, Wm. Laird (1966) [1903]. The Royal Navy: A History from Ancient Times to the Death of Queen Victoria. Vol. 7. AMS Press.
- Colledge, J. J.; Warlow, Ben & Bush, Steve (2020). Ships of the Royal Navy: The Complete Record of all Fighting Ships of the Royal Navy from the 15th Century to the Present (5th revised and updated ed.). Seaforth Publishing. ISBN 978-1-5267-9327-0.
- Dodson, Aidan (2015). "The Incredible Hulks: The Fisgard Training Establishment and Its Ships". Warship 2015. Conway. pp. 29–43. ISBN 978-1-84486-276-4.
- Friedman, Norman (2018). British Battleships of the Victorian Era. Naval Institute Press. ISBN 978-1-68247-329-0.
- Lyon, David & Winfield, Rif (2004). The Sail & Steam Navy List: All the Ships of the Royal Navy 1815–1889. Chatham Publishing. ISBN 1-86176-032-9.
- Parkes, Oscar (1990) [1966]. British Battleships, Warrior 1860 to Vanguard 1950: A History of Design, Construction, and Armament (New & rev. ed.). Naval Institute Press. ISBN 1-55750-075-4.
- Roberts, John (1979). "Great Britain (including Empire Forces)". In Chesneau, Roger & Kolesnik, Eugene M. (eds.). Conway's All the World's Fighting Ships 1860–1905. Mayflower Books. pp. 1–113. ISBN 0-8317-0302-4.
