= HMS Swiftsure (1870) =

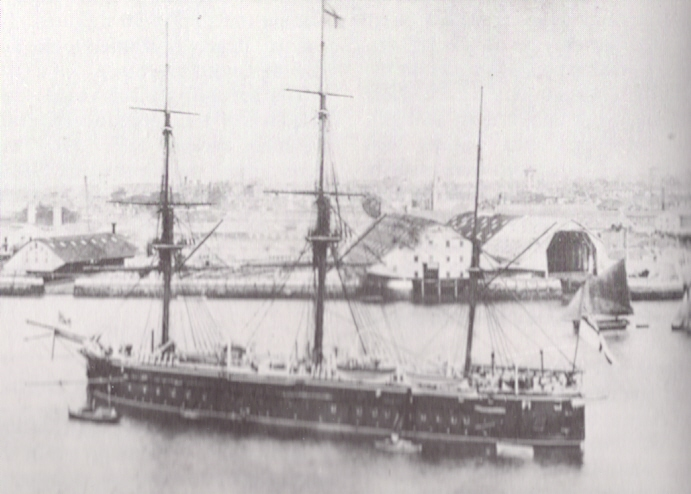
- Swiftsure sometime after she was converted to barque rig during an 1879-1881 refit.

History

United Kingdom
- Name: Swiftsure
- Builder: Palmers, Jarrow
- Laid down: 31 August 1868
- Launched: 15 June 1870
- Completed: 27 June 1872
- Renamed: Orontes, March 1904
- Fate: Sold for scrap, 4 July 1908

General characteristics (as built)
- Class & type: Swiftsure-class ironclad
- Displacement: 6,640–6,910 long tons (6,750–7,020 t)
- Length: 280 ft (85.3 m) (p/p)
- Beam: 55 ft (16.8 m)
- Draught: 25 ft (7.6 m)
- Installed power: 6 rectangular fire-tube boilers; 4,913 ihp (3,664 kW)
- Propulsion: 1 shaft; HRCR steam engine
- Sail plan: Ship-rigged
- Speed: 13.5 knots (25.0 km/h; 15.5 mph) (steam); 12.5 knots (23.2 km/h; 14.4 mph) (sail)
- Range: 1,640–1,680 nmi (3,040–3,110 km; 1,890–1,930 mi) at 10 knots (19 km/h; 12 mph)
- Complement: 450
- Armament: 10 × 9 in (229 mm) muzzle-loading rifles; 4 × 6 in (152 mm) muzzle-loading rifles; 6 × 20 pdr (3.75 in (95 mm)) saluting guns
- Armour: Waterline belt: 6–8 in (152–203 mm); Box battery: 4–6 in (102–152 mm); Bulkheads: 4–5 in (102–127 mm)

HMS Swiftsure was the lead ship of her class of two central-battery ironclads built for the Royal Navy (RN) during the 1870s. The ship was completed in 1872 and was briefly assigned to the Channel Fleet before being transferred to the Mediterranean Fleet where she spent most of the rest of the decade. The ironclad had a minor role in capturing a pair of rebel ships during the Spanish Cantonal Rebellion in 1873 and returning them to the central government. Swiftsure was one of the British ships that deterred the Russian Empire from attacking the Turkish capital of Constantinople during the Russo-Turkish War of 1877–1878.

Her sister ship HMS Triumph was the first of the sisters to serve as the Pacific Station flagship beginning in 1878 and they rotated the assignment between them at roughly three-year intervals until Swiftsure was relieved by a different ship in 1890. In between those times, they were usually refitted and spent several years in reserve. When the Pacific Fleet assignments ended in 1890, Swiftsure spent a year as the flagship of the local reserve forces and then served as a guardship until 1893. She was subsequently relegated to the reserves until 1901 when the ship was hulked and converted into a storeship. She was renamed Orontes in 1904 and sold for scrap in 1908.

== Background and description ==
The Swiftsure class was intended to serve on the Pacific Station where coal was very expensive so the ships' sailing qualities had to be equal to their performance under steam, while at the same time being stable ships and good gun platforms. The ships were 280 feet (85.3 m) long between perpendiculars, had a beam of 55 feet (16.8 m) and a draught of 25 feet (7.6 m). Swiftsure displaced 6,910 long tons (7,020 t) and had a tonnage of 3,893 tons burthen. They had a complement of 450 officers and ratings.

The Swiftsure-class ships were fitted wuth a single two-cylinder, horizontal-return, connecting-rod steam engine built by Maudslay, Sons and Field that was rated at 800 nominal horsepower. It drove the shaft of the 23-foot-6-inch (7.16 m) propeller using steam provided by six rectangular fire-tube boilers. Swiftsure reached a speed of 13.8 knots (25.6 km/h; 15.9 mph) from 4,913 indicated horsepower (3,664 kW) during her sea trials. The ship carried 540 long tons (550 t) of coal that gave her a range of 1,640 nautical miles (3,040 km; 1,890 mi) at 10 knots (19 km/h; 12 mph).

The Swiftsure class was initially ship-rigged with three masts and had a sail area of 32,900 square feet (3,060 m^{2}), excluding stunsails. Around 1877–1878 they were re-rigged as barques with their sail area reduced to 22,750 square feet (2,114 m^{2}). To reduce drag, the funnel was telescopic and could be lowered and the propeller could be hoisted into the hull. Under sail alone, they could reach 12.5 knots (23.2 km/h; 14.4 mph).

=== Armament and armour ===
The main battery of the Swiftsure-class ships consisted of 10 RML 9-inch (229 mm) rifled muzzle-loading guns with the guns positioned amidships in a central-battery configuation just like that of the Audacious-class ships. Six of these were positioned on the main deck, three on each broadside, and the other four guns were mounted on the corners of the upper deck box battery. The battery protruded over the sides of the ships to give the guns a certain amount of end-on fire. The ships were also equipped with four RML six-inch (152 mm) (71 cwt) (Note: "Cwt" is the abbreviation for hundredweight, 71 cwt referring to the weight of the gun.) guns as chase guns, two in the bow and another pair in the stern. They also had six RBL 20-pounder (3.75 in (95 mm)) rifled breech-loading guns that were initially used as saluting guns.

In 1880–1882, the ships received four 14-inch (356 mm) torpedo launchers on the main deck, two on each broadside; in 1882 Swiftsure had six-inch guns were replaced by eight BL four-inch (102 mm) Mk I guns. By 1886 the ship had had her 20-pounders removed, and carried instead four QF six pounders, six 1-inch Nordenfelt guns, one five-barrel 0.45-inch (11 mm) Nordenfelt gun, and four Gardener guns. By 1890 the ship's anti-torpedo boat battery consisted of a mix of six- and QF three-pounder (47 mm (1.9 in)) guns, four of each type.

The armour scheme of the Swiftsures was identical to that of the Audacious class with the wrought-iron, waterline armour belt covering the entire length of the ships. It was eight inches (203 mm) thick amidships, backed by eight to ten inches (203 to 254 mm) of teak, and thinned to six inches towards the ends of the ships. It only protected the main deck and reached 4 feet (1 m) above the waterline at full load and 3 feet (0.9 m) below. The main deck citadel's ends were protected by a five-inch (127 mm) forward bulkhead and a four-inch one aft. The sides and embrasures of the upper battery were six inches thick, but its ends were unprotected. The bridge was fitted with a one-man conning tower with walls three inches (76 mm) thick.

== Construction and career ==
HMS Swiftsure was the seventh ship of her name to serve in the RN. Ordered in 1868 from Palmers Shipbuilding and Iron Company, the ship was laid down at the company's shipyard at Jarrow on 31 August 1868 and launched on 15 June 1870. Commissioned by Captain William Ward for trials with the Channel Fleet in September 1871, she was found to be almost unbeatable as a performer under sail, being bested only by the frigate HMS Aurora which was reputed to be one of the all-time fastest ships in the entire navy.

Completed on 27 June 1872, Swiftsure was assigned to the Mediterranean Fleet and relieved the ironclad HMS Defence in August 1872, and remained in the Mediterranean until 1878. In early 1873, the First Spanish Republic was beset with the Cantonal Revolution. The Royal Navy deployed a squadron that included Swiftsure off the southern coast of Spain in response. A small German squadron joined them in June that included the ironclad SMS Friedrich Carl, under the command of Vizeadmiral Reinhold Werner. Werner, the senior commander in the group, was given command of the Anglo-German force.

A rebel faction of the Spanish Navy had seized four of the country's seven ironclads: the armoured corvette Méndez Núñez, and the armoured frigates Tetuán, Numancia, and Vitoria. The central government declared them to be pirates on 20 July. Accompanied by the frigate Almansa, the Vitoria steamed towards Málaga after Almería had rejected their demand to pay a ransom. En route, the rebel ships were intercepted by Friedrich Carl and Swiftsure and forced to surrender; the British ship seizing the ironclad and the German one took the frigate with the rebel commander Juan Contreras y Román aboard. The rebel ships were taken to the outer port of Cartagena where the crews were released. With British crews aboard because the German government had disavowed Werner's actions, they were then escorted by Swiftsure and Triumph to Gibraltar in early August where they were turned over to the central government on 26 September.

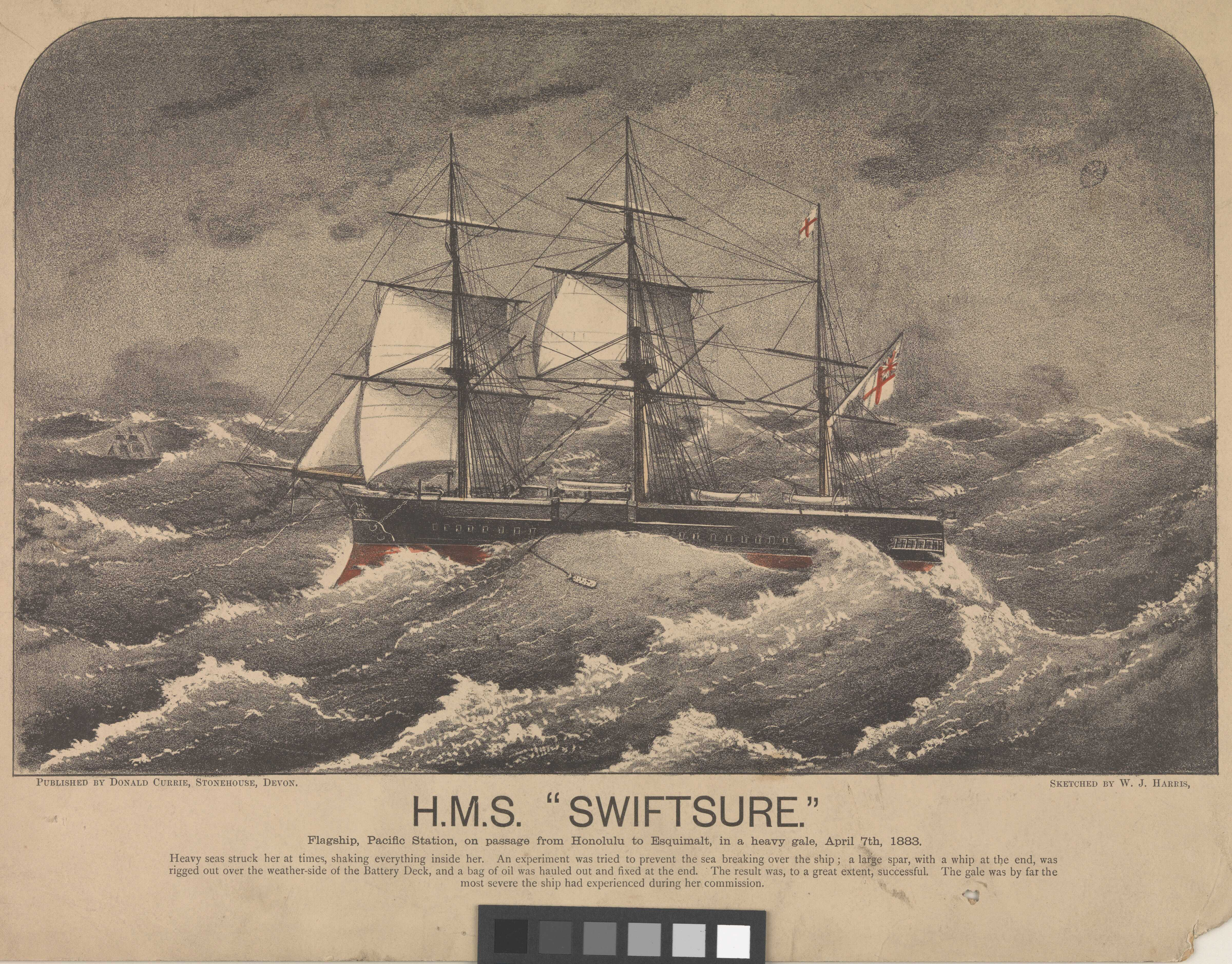
HMS Swiftsure during a passage from Honolulu to Esquimalt, 1883

During the Russo-Turkish War, Swiftsure was one of the six ironclads that Vice-Admiral Geoffrey Hornby led through the Dardanelles on 14–15 February 1878 to the Turkish capital of Constantinople in a successful effort to intimidate the victorious Russian Empire from continuing their advance on the capital. By this time the ship was commanded by Captain Nowell Salmon, VC. Shortly afterwards, Swiftsure was detached from the main body and stationed in the Gulf of Saros to deter any attempts by the Russians to outflank the Turkish defences. The ironclad returned home shortly afterwards and was paid off at Devonport where she received an extensive refit; she was re-rigged with a barque rig, her armament was revised, and admiral's quarters added to enable her to relieve Triumph as Pacific Station flagship, which she did from 1882 to 1885. Upon her return home her boilers were replaced. Swiftsure was then held in reserve until a second spell as Pacific flag from April 1888 until October 1890. She was the flagship of the Devonport Reserve until August 1891. The ship then spent the next two years as a guardship before being reduced to Fleet Reserve. During the annual manoeuvres of 1893, Swiftsure's captain asked permission to spread sail, as her engines were inadequate to generate the power required to produce the speed ordered. This was the last occasion in which a British battleship spread sail while travelling in company with a fleet at sea. She was hulked in 1901 to serve as a storeship, renamed Orontes in March 1904 and sold for scrap to Castle's Shipbreakers on 4 July 1908 for £17,550.

== Bibliography ==
- Ballard, G. A. (1948). "British Central-Battery Ships: Swiftsure and Triumph". Mariner's Mirror. 34 (2): 98–111. doi:10.1080/00253359.1948.10657514. ISSN 2049-680X.
- Clowes, Wm. Laird (1966) [1903]. The Royal Navy: A History from Ancient Times to the Death of Queen Victoria. Vol. 7. AMS Press.
- Colledge, J. J.; Warlow, Ben & Bush, Steve (2020). Ships of the Royal Navy: The Complete Record of all Fighting Ships of the Royal Navy from the 15th Century to the Present (5th revised and updated ed.). Seaforth Publishing. ISBN 978-1-5267-9327-0.
- Friedman, Norman (2018). British Battleships of the Victorian Era. Naval Institute Press. ISBN 978-1-68247-329-0.
- Greene, Jack & Massignani, Alessandro (1998). Ironclads at War: The Origin and Development of the Armored Warship, 1854–1891. Combined Publishing. ISBN 0-938289-58-6.
- Lyon, David & Winfield, Rif (2004). The Sail & Steam Navy List: All the Ships of the Royal Navy 1815–1889. Chatham Publishing. ISBN 1-86176-032-9.
- Parkes, Oscar (1990) [1966]. British Battleships, Warrior 1860 to Vanguard 1950: A History of Design, Construction, and Armament (New & rev. ed.). Naval Institute Press. ISBN 1-55750-075-4.
- Roberts, John (1979). "Great Britain (including Empire Forces)". In Chesneau, Roger & Kolesnik, Eugene M. (eds.). Conway's All the World's Fighting Ships 1860–1905. Mayflower Books. pp. 1–113. ISBN 0-8317-0302-4.
- Sondhaus, Lawrence (2001). Naval Warfare, 1815–1914. Routledge. ISBN 978-0-415-21478-0.
