= Swiftsure =

Swiftsure may refer to:

- HMS Swiftsure, the Royal Navy has had ten ships named HMS Swiftsure since 1573
- Swiftsure (1811 brig)
- SS Malay (1921), an oil tanker originally named Swiftsure
- Swiftsure-class submarine, a class of nuclear-powered fleet submarines in service with the Royal Navy from the early 1970s until 2010
- Swiftsure Yacht Race
- United States lightship Swiftsure (LV-83)
