= Barbette =

Type of gun emplacement

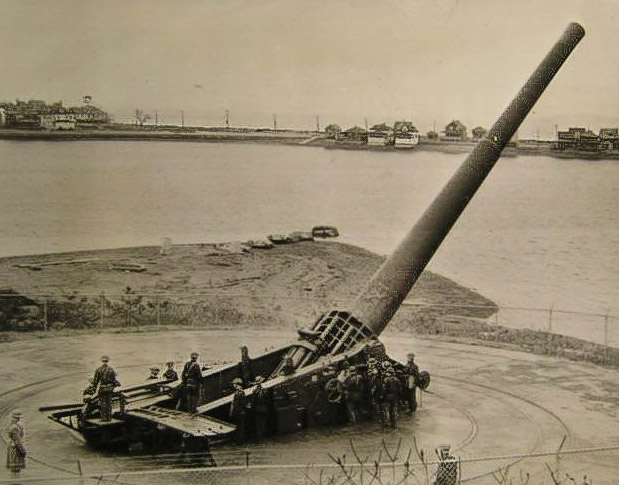
US Army 16-inch gun M1919 on barbette mount M1919; this was a high-angle mount with elevation to 65°. The photo was taken at Fort Duvall in 1928.

Barbettes are several types of gun emplacement in terrestrial fortifications or on naval ships.

In recent naval usage, a barbette is a protective circular armour support for a heavy gun turret. This evolved from earlier forms of gun protection that eventually led to the pre-dreadnought. The name barbette ultimately comes from fortification: it originally meant a raised platform or mound, as in the French phrase en barbette, which refers to the practice of firing a cannon over a parapet rather than through an embrasure in a fortification's casemate. The former gives better angles of fire but less protection than the latter. The disappearing gun was a variation on the barbette gun; it consisted of a heavy gun on a carriage that would retract behind a parapet or into a gunpit for reloading. Barbettes were primarily used in coastal defences, but saw some use in a handful of warships, and some inland fortifications. The term is also used for certain aircraft gun mounts.

Shipboard barbettes were primarily used in armoured warships, starting in the 1860s during a period of intense experimentation with other mounting systems for heavy guns at sea. In these, gun barrels usually protruded over the barbette edge, so barbettes provided only partial protection, mainly for the ammunition supply. Alternatives included the heavily-armoured gun turret and an armoured, fixed central gun battery. By the late 1880s, all three systems were replaced with a hybrid barbette-turret system that combined the benefits of both types. The armoured vertical tube that supported the new gun mount was referred to as a barbette.

Guns with restricted arcs of fire mounted in heavy bombers during World War II—such those in the tail of the aircraft, as opposed to fully revolving turrets—were also sometimes referred to as having barbette mounts, though usage of the term is primarily restricted to British publications. American authors generally refer to such mounts as tail guns or as tail gun turrets.

== Use in fortifications ==
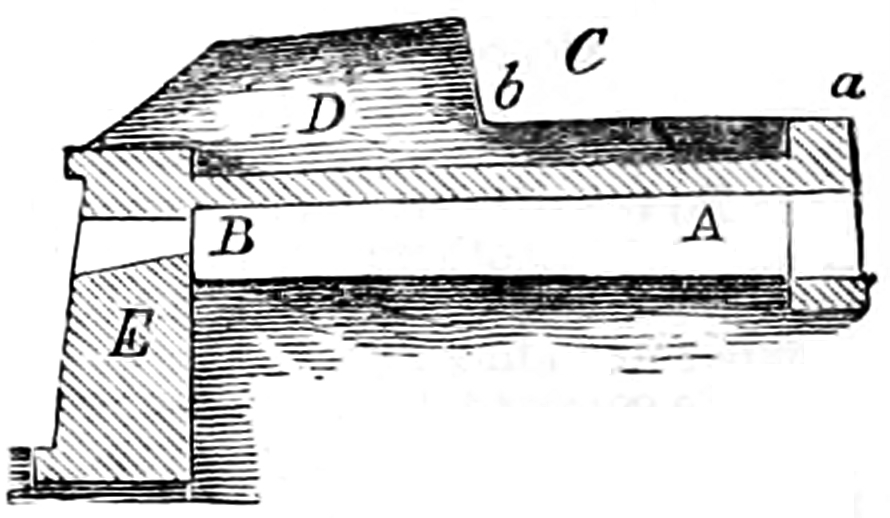
Cross-section of a 19th-century fortification; a gun at position "C" would be firing from a barbette position

The use of barbette mountings originated in ground fortifications. The term originally referred to a raised platform on a rampart for one or more guns, enabling them to be fired over a parapet. This gave rise to the phrase en barbette, which referred to a gun placed to fire over a parapet, rather than through an embrasure, an opening in a fortification wall. While an en barbette emplacement offered wider arcs of fire, it also exposed the gun's crew to greater danger from hostile fire. In addition, since the barbette position would be higher than a casemate position—that is, a gun firing through an embrasure—it would generally have a greater field of fire.

The American military theorist Dennis Hart Mahan suggested that light guns, particularly howitzers, were best suited for barbette emplacements since they could fire explosive shells and could be easily withdrawn when they came under enemy fire. Fortifications in the 19th century typically employed both casemate and barbette emplacements. For example, the Russian Constantine Battery outside Sevastopol was equipped with 43 heavy guns in its seaward side during the Crimean War in the mid-1850s; of these, 27 were barbette mounted, with the rest in casemates.

A modified version of the barbette type was the disappearing gun, which placed a heavy gun on a carriage that retracted behind a parapet for reloading; this better protected the crew, and made the gun harder to target, since it was only visible while it was firing. The type was usually used for coastal defence guns. As naval gun turrets improved to allow greater elevation and range, many disappearing guns, most of which were limited in elevation, were seen as obsolescent; with aircraft becoming prominent in the First World War, they were largely seen as obsolete. However, they remained in use through the early Second World War, at least by the United States, due to limited funding for replacement weapons between the wars.

Later heavy coastal guns were often protected in hybrid installations, in wide casemates with cantilevered overhead cover partially covering a barbette or gunhouse mount.

== Use in warships ==
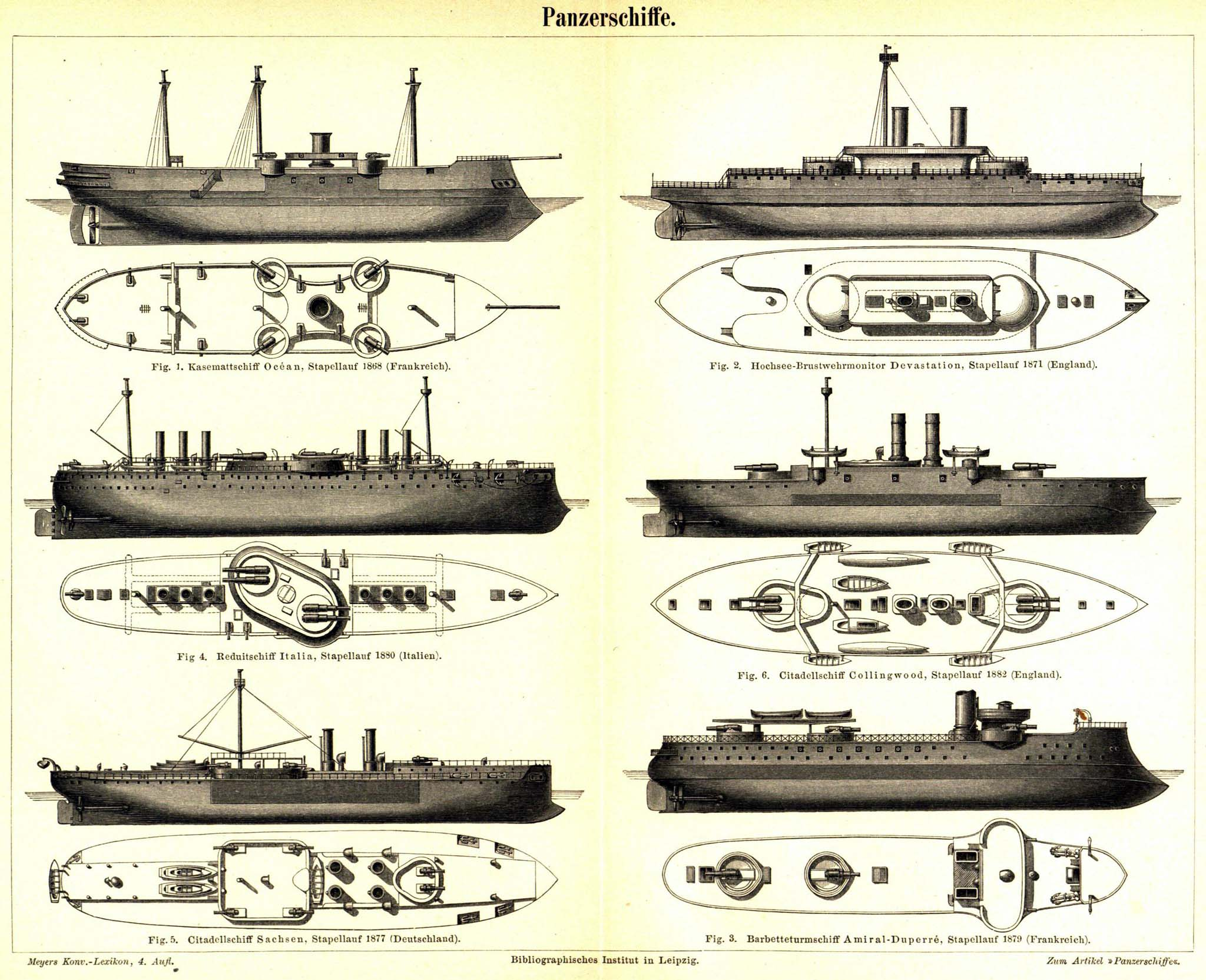
Illustration of several armored ships from the 1880s, showing the degree of experimentation with armament arrangements

Following the introduction of ironclad warships in the early 1860s, naval designers grappled with the problem of mounting heavy guns in the most efficient way possible, beginning with broadside box batteries and quickly moving to rotating gun turrets, since these afforded the ability to fire directly ahead, which was deemed important due to the adoption of ramming tactic after the Battle of Lissa in 1866. But early turrets were very heavy, which necessitated a low freeboard to reduce topweight and a corresponding tendency to capsize. By the 1870s, designers had shifted to the rotating barbette mount, which eschewed armor protection to reduce weight; this would permit the use of heavy guns in high-freeboard ships. This new type of vessel was referred to as a barbette ship, to differentiate them from turret ships and central battery ships.

In the late 1880s, the British Royal Navy adopted a new mounting that combined the benefits of both kinds of mounts in the Majestic class. A heavily armoured, rotating gun house was added to the revolving platform, which kept the guns and their crews protected. The gun house was smaller and lighter than the old-style turrets, which still permitted placement higher in the ship and the corresponding benefits to stability and seakeeping. This innovation gradually became known simply as a turret, though the armored tube that held the turret substructure, which included the shell and propellant handling rooms and the ammunition hoists, was still referred to as a barbette. These ships were the prototype of the so-called pre-dreadnought battleships, which proved to be broadly influential in all major navies over the next fifteen years.

== Use in bomber aircraft ==
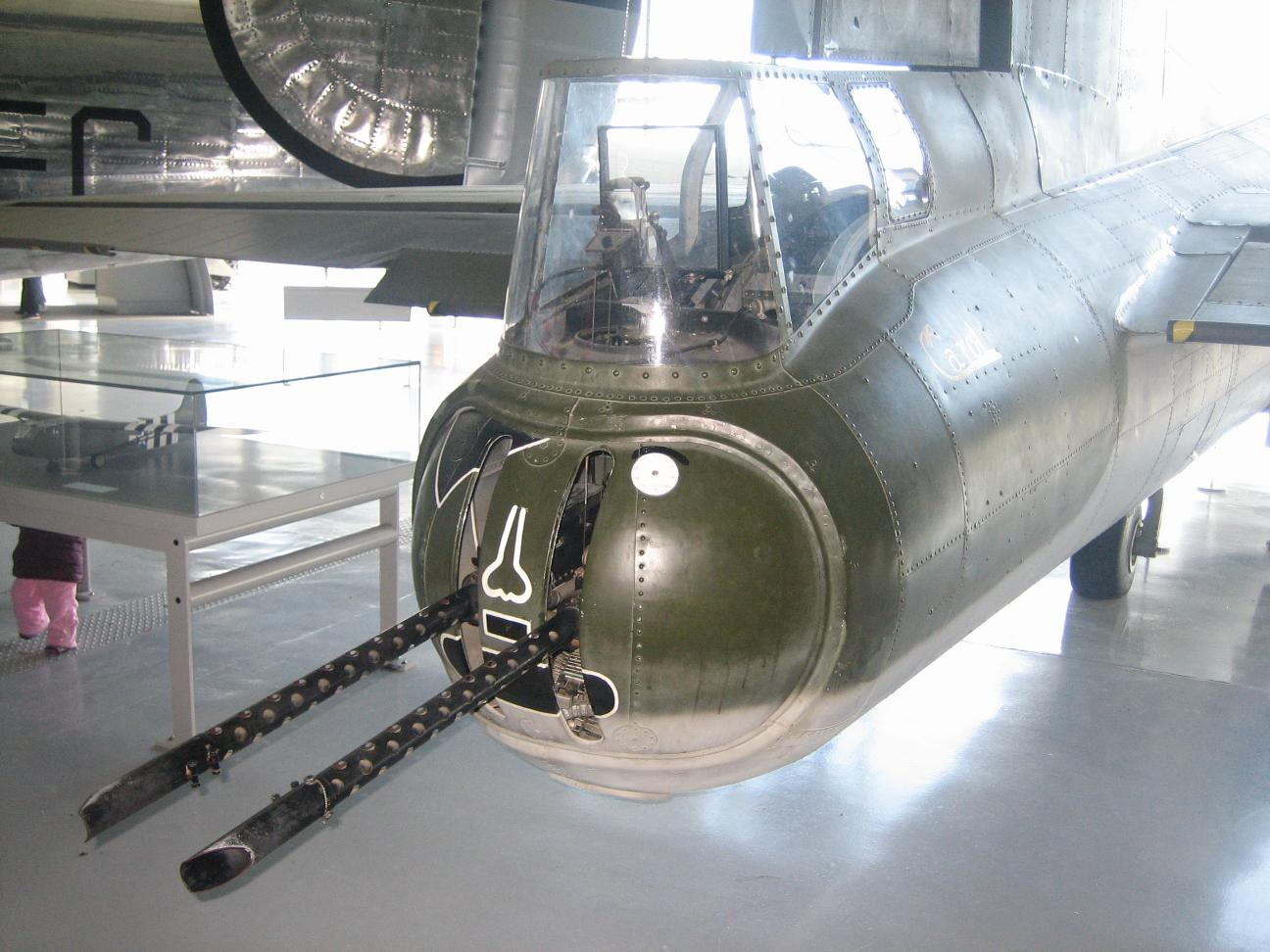
Rear "Cheyenne"-pattern gun position on a B-17G Flying Fortress

When applied to military aircraft, largely in aviation history books written by British historians, a barbette is a position on an aircraft where a gun is in a mounting which has a restricted arc of fire when compared to a turret, or which is remotely mounted away from the gunner. As such it is frequently used to describe the tail gunner position on bombers such as the Boeing B-17 Flying Fortress, with American aviation books frequently describing the position as a tail gun turret, or simply as a tail gun.

The term "barbette" is also used by some, again primarily British historians, to describe a remotely aimed and operated gun turret emplacement on almost any non-American military aircraft of World War II, but it is not usable in a direct translation for the varying German language terms used on Luftwaffe aircraft of that era for such emplacements. As just one example, the German Heinkel He 177A heavy bomber had such a remotely operated twin-MG 131 machine gun Fernbedienbare Drehlafette FDL 131Z (Z – "zwilling"/twin) powered forward dorsal gun turret, with the full translation of the German term comprising the prefix as "Remotely controlled rotating gun mount". The term "Lafette" in German actually refers to a gun carriage of nearly any type, with its original use as being for the mounting design for bombard-style siege guns of the Middle Ages.
