= HMS Doterel (1880) =

Sloop of the Royal Navy

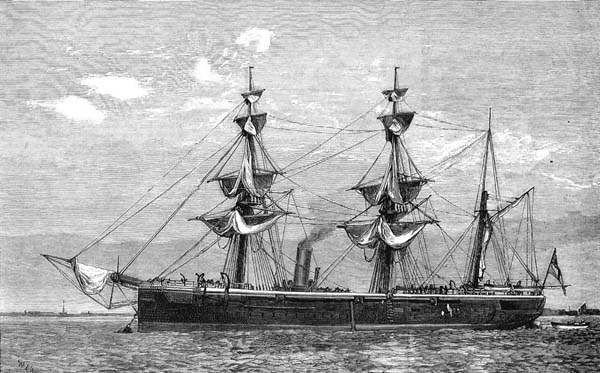
- An illustration of HMS Doterel from 14 May 1881

History

United Kingdom
- Name: HMS Doterel
- Builder: Chatham Dockyard
- Way number: No 3 slip
- Laid down: 13 May 1878
- Launched: 2 March 1880
- Sponsored by: Miss Hunt-Grubbe
- Commissioned: 7 December 1880
- Fate: Sunk 26 April 1881

General characteristics
- Class & type: Doterel-class sloop
- Displacement: 1,130
- Length: 170 ft (52 m) pp
- Beam: 36 ft (11 m)
- Draught: 15 ft 9 in (4.80 m)
- Installed power: 900 ihp (670 kW)
- Propulsion: 3 × cylindrical boilers; 2-cylinder horizontal compound-expansion steam engine; Single screw
- Sail plan: Barque rigged
- Speed: 11 knots (20 km/h)
- Range: 1,480 nmi (2,740 km) at 10 kn (19 km/h) from 150 tons of coal
- Crew: 155
- Armament: 2 × 7-inch (90cwt) muzzle-loading rifles; 4 × 64-pounder muzzle-loading rifles; 4 × machine guns; 1 × light gun

HMS Doterel was a Doterel-class sloop launched by the Royal Navy in 1880. She sank at anchor off Punta Arenas after an explosion on 26 April 1881 during her maiden voyage to the Pacific. Her loss caused the deaths of 143 crew members, and there were 12 survivors. She was en route to join the Pacific Station. Her loss was initially the source of much speculation. Causes considered included an attack by the Fenians, a lost torpedo, and a coal gas explosion. An enquiry in September 1881 concluded coal gas was the cause.

In November 1881, an explosion in HMS Triumph killed three men and wounded seven; it was determined to have been caused by "xerotine siccative", one of a compound commonly called "patent driers." A survivor of the Doterel explosion recalled smelling that compound shortly before the explosion. In 1883 the government determined xerotine siccative caused the first explosion on Doterel, which set off the more damaging explosion of the forward magazine. The Admiralty ordered the compound withdrawn from use in the Royal Navy and better ventilation below decks.

== Design and construction ==
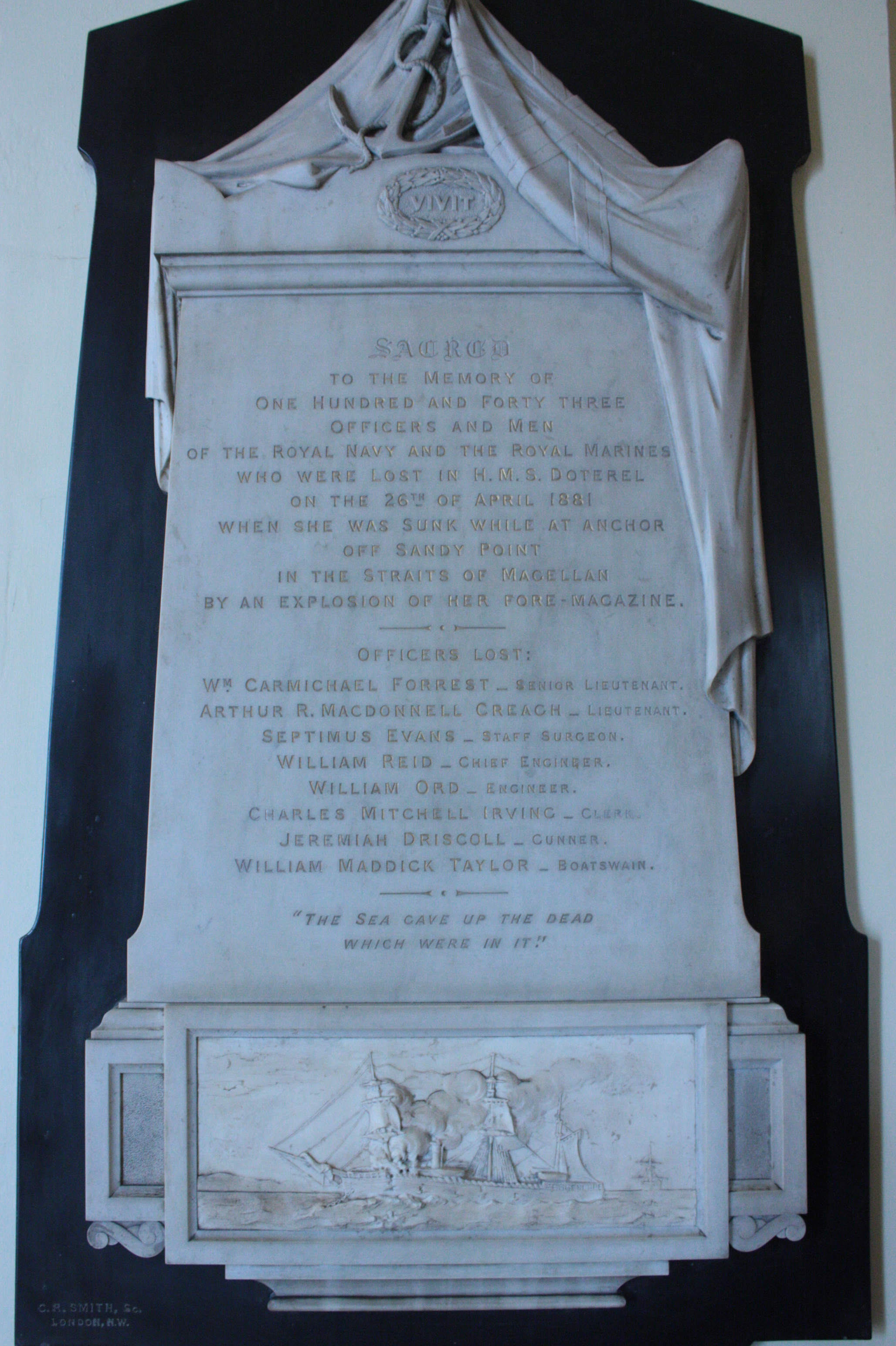
Memorial to the loss of HMS Doterel, Chapel, Greenwich Naval College

The Doterel class was designed by Nathaniel Barnaby as a development of William Henry White's 1874 Osprey-class sloop. The graceful clipper bow of the Ospreys was replaced by a vertical stem and the engines were more powerful. The hull was of composite construction, with wooden planks over an iron frame. Power was provided by three cylindrical boilers, which supplied steam at 60 pounds per square inch (410 kPa) to a two-cylinder horizontal compound-expansion steam engine driving a single 13-foot-1-inch (3.99 m) screw. This arrangement produced 900 indicated horsepower (670 kW) and a top speed of 11 knots (20 km/h).

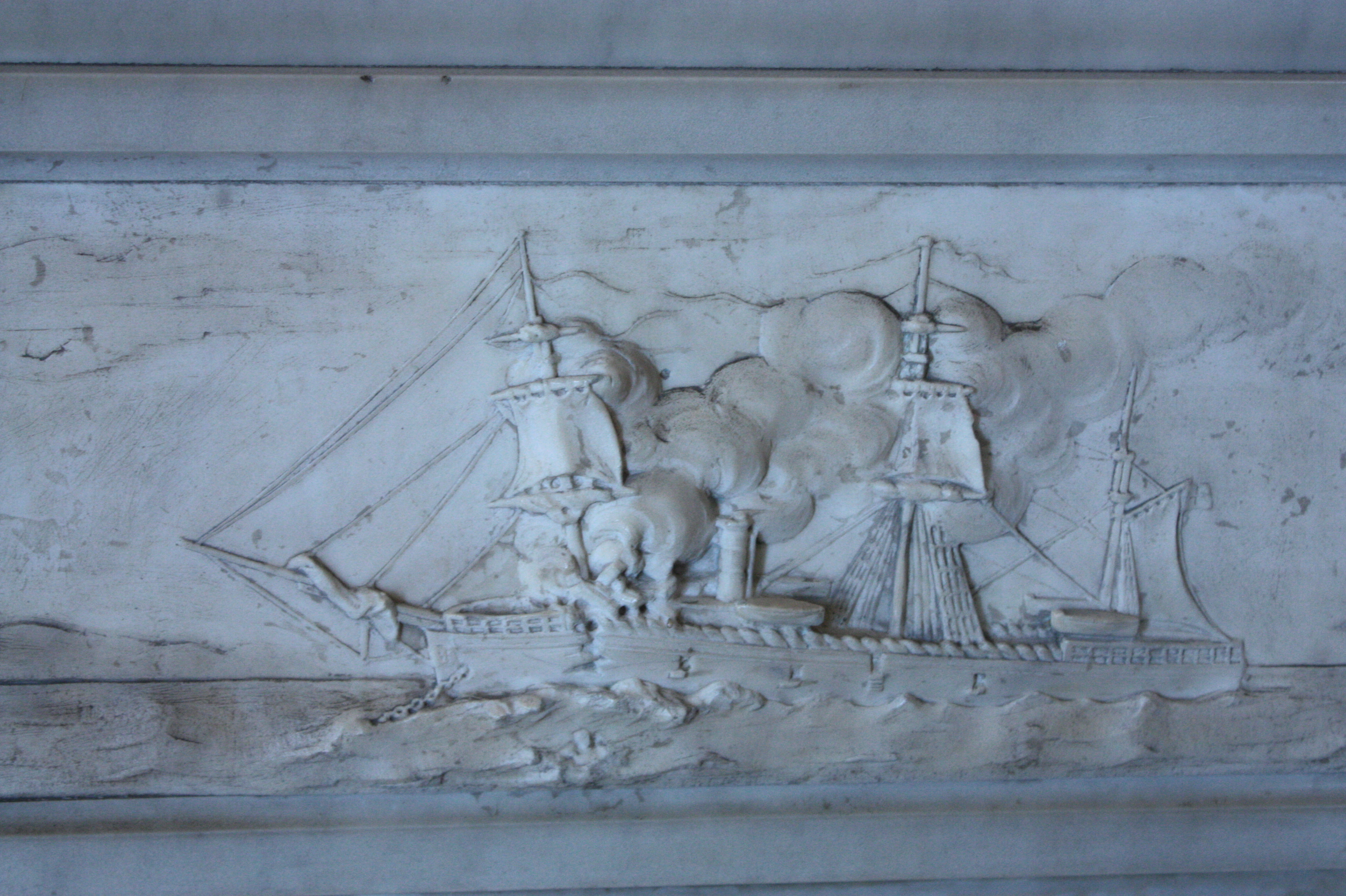
The explosion on HMS Doterel (detail on the Greenwich memorial)

Ships of the class were armed with two 7-inch (90 cwt) muzzle-loading rifled guns on pivoting mounts, and four 64-pounder muzzle-loading rifled guns (two on pivoting mounts, and two broadside). Four machine guns and one light gun completed the weaponry. All the ships of the class were provided with a barque rig, that is, square-rigged foremast and mainmast, and fore-and-aft sails only on the mizzen mast.

=== Crew ===
Doterel would have had a normal complement of 140–150 men, although on the day of the explosion and sinking she had 155 men on board, despite five having deserted since leaving Sheerness. Some of the supernumeraries may have been bound for ships already on station in the Pacific; one of the survivors, Engineer Walker, was due to join HMS Garnet.

== Construction ==
Doterel was ordered from Chatham Dockyard and laid down on 13 May 1878. She was launched on 2 March 1880 from Number 3 slip, and was named by Miss Hunt-Grubbe, daughter of the captain of Steam Reserves at Chatham. She was commissioned on 7 December 1880.

== Service ==
Sloops such as Doterel were used in the far-flung parts of Britain's maritime empire for constabulary duties. Barnaby, Doterel's designer, was an enthusiast of heavily armed but un-armoured frigates, sloops and corvettes, arguing that the Navy's tasks were best accomplished by a number of small, cheap ships. The system of colonial cruisers provided an inexpensive peace-keeping force for the protection of British interests, and gave imperial representatives a supply of sailors, marines and guns to deal with local rulers, rebellions and banditry. Doterel was assigned to the Pacific Station, which included the western coasts of North and South America as well as China and Japan. Under Commander Richard Evans she sailed from Sheerness, Kent on 17 January 1881. Having called at Madeira, St Vincent and Montevideo, she anchored at Punta Arenas, Chile on 26 April 1881 at 09:00.

== Sinking ==
At about 10:15 on 26 April while the ship was at anchor off Punta Arenas, an explosion occurred in the forward magazine. Eyewitnesses described how objects of every type were thrown high into the air, and a huge column of smoke was seen to rise from the ship. The ship sank instantly.

Boats of every kind put off from shore to seek survivors, as well as from the missionary schooner Allen Gardiner, the Chilean schooner San Jose, and the pontoon Kate Kellogg. 143 of the 155 crew members were killed. The captain was one of the twelve survivors, rescued by a boat from San Jose. He was found stripped naked by the blast and bleeding from several wounds.

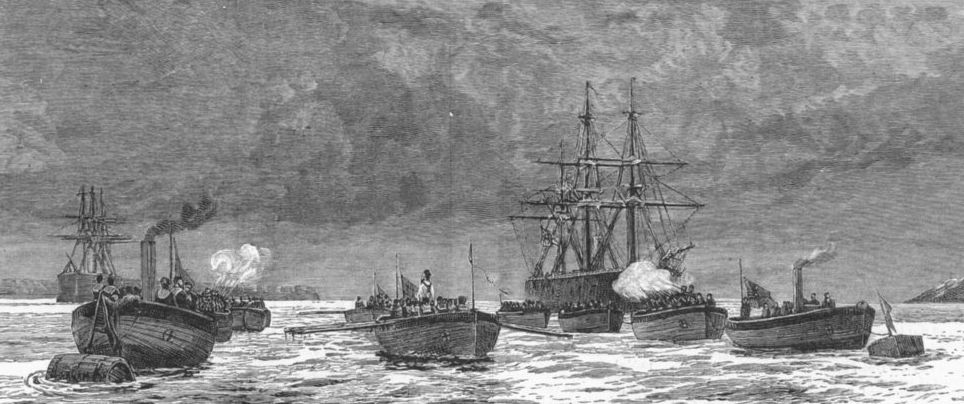
Funeral service performed over the remains of those who perished by the explosion – The Graphic, London 1881

That afternoon, crews recovered bodies from the water; only three were recovered whole. The various body parts were put into boxes and buried at sea the same afternoon. Reverend Thomas Bridges, an Anglican missionary at Ushuaia, presided over the mass funeral in the harbour for the many sailors killed in the explosion.

Commander Evans, the captain of Doterel telegrammed the Admiralty from Montevideo on 3 May 1881:

'Doterel' totally destroyed and sunk by explosion of fore magazine at Sandy Point, (Note: Punta Arenas was then known by English speakers as "Sandy Point") 10 a.m., April 26. Cause unknown, supposed boiler burst and exploded magazine. Twelve survivors, all well, proceeding in Britannia for Liverpool. Stokes (lieutenant) remains Sandy Point, awaiting orders. Have telegraphed Pacific, and Jones. (Note: Rear Admiral William Gore Jones was the commander-in-chief of the East Indies Station) Survivors. Commander Evans, Lieutenant Stokes, Paymaster Colborne, Engineer Walker (of Garnet), Carpenter Baird, Gunner's Mate Pengelly, Quartermaster Trout, Caulker's Mate Ford, Shipwright Walkers, Ordinary Seaman James Smith, Stoker Turner, Marine Summers. Discharged. Inlis (clerk), Miggeridge (sick bay man), Hayes (private), Motton (A.B.). John Ellery (A.B.) deserted. Dead.—Eight officers, 135 men.

— Commander Richard Evans, 3 May 1881

The ship's guns, screw and other valuable fittings were salvaged by Garnet and Turquoise. The contemporary rules governing pensions allowed the widow or dependent children of the dead men a gratuity equal to a year's pay, although the loss of their property was not compensated.

== Cause of the explosion ==
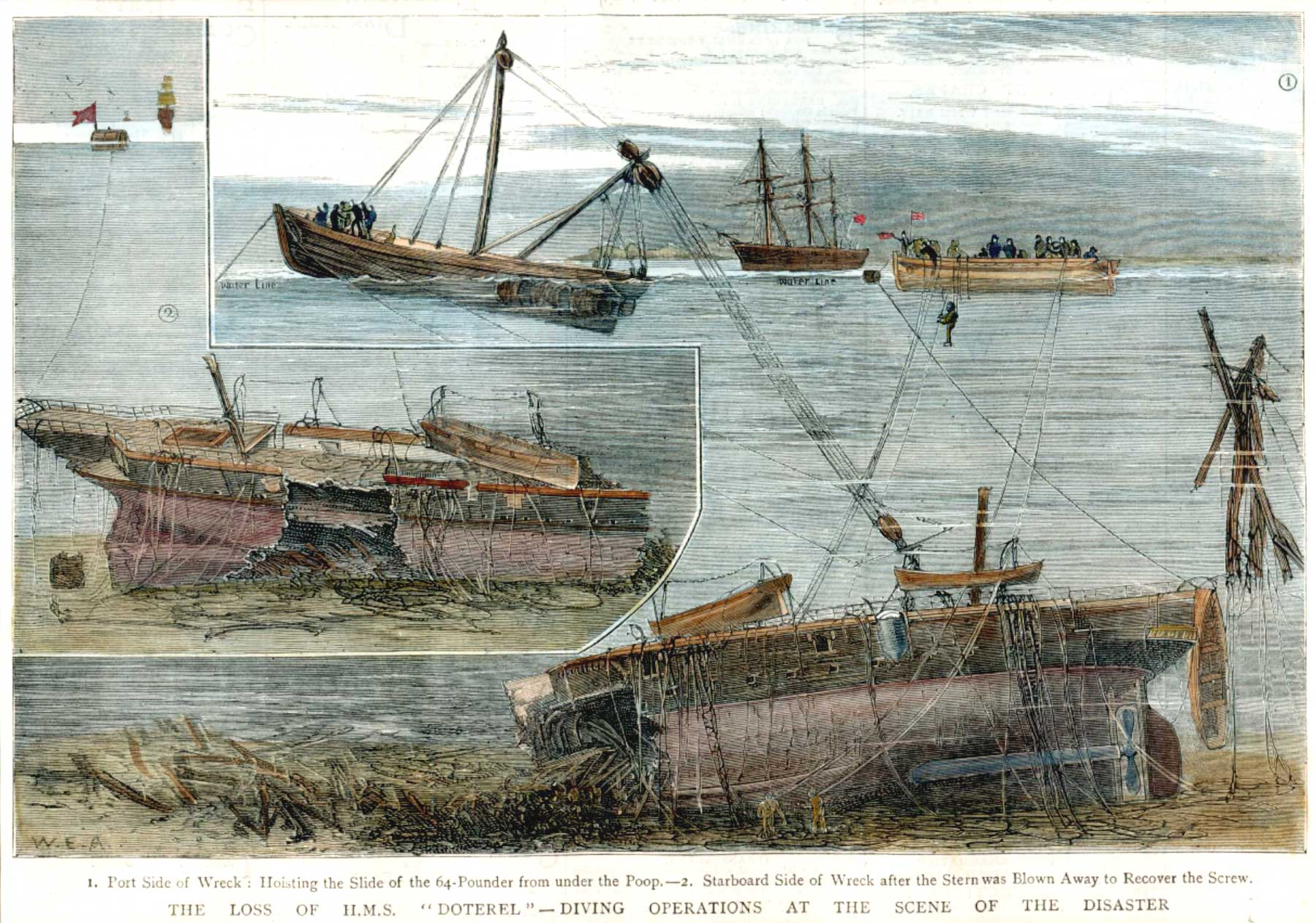
Recovery of Doterel's wreckage

Initial reports blamed an explosion in the boilers, which detonated the magazine. This was definitively proven to be false when the crew of Garnet found the boilers in perfect condition. Conjecture also suggested the Fenians (Note: The Fenians were a group of Irish nationalists formed in 1858. The activist group had been credited with multiple bombings, including the Clerkenwell explosion. (The Fenians were succeeded by the Irish Republican Army.)) could have blown up the ship with a coal torpedo, the explosion could have been caused by a Whitehead torpedo lost by Shah in 1878, or coal gas from the bunkers might have caused the explosion. An enquiry was held at Portsmouth, which referred the evidence to a scientific committee. In September 1881, they determined that the explosion was caused by the detonation of coal gas in the bunkers, and that no crew members were at fault.

On 21 November 1881, an explosion occurred in Triumph, caused by a drying compound called "xerotine siccative", also called a patent drier. (Note: "xerotine", from Greek ξηρός (xēros, "dry") and "siccative", from Latin siccus ("dry, sober") both meaning "drying compound". Xerotine siccative is a compound added to paint to thicken the oil and speed the drying process. It consisted of a very "volatile petroleum product." It is a terebene, a series of hydrocarbons produced from oil of turpentine and sulphuric acid. At the time, "patent driers" were used between the metal and wooden hulls to prevent corrosion.) Three men were killed and seven were wounded.

It was not until 1883 that the cause of the Doterel explosion was settled. A surviving crew member of that ship, upon later smelling xerotine siccative while on board Indus, stated that he had smelled it before the 1881 explosion. He explained to authorities that a jar of liquid had cracked while being moved below deck. Subsequent investigation revealed that just before the explosion in Doterel, two men were ordered to throw the jar overboard. While cleaning the leaking explosive liquid from beneath the forward magazine, the men may have broken the rule of not having an open flame below decks. The xerotine siccative exploded first, setting off the huge explosion in the forward magazine, which contained 4 tons and 7 cwt (4,456 kg) of explosives.

The Admiralty ordered xerotine siccative to be discontinued from use in the fleet, and a system of ventilation was recommended for all ships of the Royal Navy.

== Memorials ==
- A memorial plaque made of wood and canvas was placed in the "British section" of Punta Arenas Cemetery in 1936 by the crew of the Turquoise.
- A bronze memorial, with the names of the dead, was placed in the Punta Arenas municipal cemetery, where the dead were relocated in 1936, after initially being interred in the old town cemetery.
- A marble wall tablet was placed in the chapel lobby of the Royal Naval College, Greenwich, now the Old Royal Naval College.
- A private memorial exists in Winchester Cathedral to William Carmichael Forest, 1st Lieutenant of HMS Doterel, son of Captain Forest, Chief Constable of Hampshire and his wife Selina. William's body was recovered much later and buried in the cemetery at 'Sandy Point' on July 4, 1881, according to the memorial.
- A sister ship of the Doterel, HMS Gannet, still exists at Chatham's historic dockyard and can be visited there.

== In literature ==
Arthur Conan Doyle referred to the sinking of Doterel in the short story "That Little Square Box".

'Excuse me', returned Flannigan, but is there not some room for doubt yet as to the fate of the Dotterel? I have met men in America who asserted from their own personal knowledge that there was a coal torpedo aboard that vessel.

— Arthur Conan Doyle, "That Little Square Box" from The Captain of the Polestar and Other Tales, 1881
