= HMS Swiftsure =

The Royal Navy has had ten ships named Swiftsure since 1573, including:

- English ship Swiftsure (1573), a galleon, renamed Speedwell and rebuilt in 1607, and lost in 1624.
- English ship Swiftsure (1621), a 42-gun great ship captured by the Dutch in 1666.
- HMS Swiftsure (1637), a warship involved a colonial admiralty lawsuit.
- HMS Swiftsure (1673), a 70-gun ship later renamed Revenge.
- HMS Swiftsure (1750), a 70-gun third-rate ship of the line.
- HMS Swiftsure (1787), a 74-gun third-rate ship of the line captured by the French in 1801. Later recaptured by the Royal Navy in the Battle of Trafalgar and renamed HMS Irresistible.
- HMS Swiftsure (1804), a 74-gun third-rate ship of the line launched in 1804 which served at the Battle of Trafalgar and was sold in 1845.
- HMS Swiftsure (1870), the lead ship of her class of ironclad battleships.
- HMS Swiftsure (1903), the lead ship of her class of pre-dreadnought battleships. She served in the Mediterranean in World War I and was broken up in 1920.
- HMS Swiftsure (08), a Minotaur-class light cruiser that served in the Far East in World War II.
- HMS Swiftsure (S126), the lead ship of her class of submarines. She was decommissioned in 1992 due to cracks in her reactor during a refit.

== Battle honours ==
- Armada 1588
- Cadiz 1596
- Santa Cruz 1657
- Lowestoft 1665
- Four Days' Battle 1666
- Schooneveld 1673
- Texel 1673
- Barfleur 1692
- Vigo 1702
- Gibraltar 1704
- Velez Malaga 1704
- Lagos 1759
- Quiberon Bay 1759
- Belle Isle 1761
- Nile 1798
- Egypt 1801
- Trafalgar 1805
- Suez Canal 1915
- Dardanelles 1915–16
- Okinawa 1945
