= Swiftsure-class ironclad =

1872 class of British Royal Navy ironclads

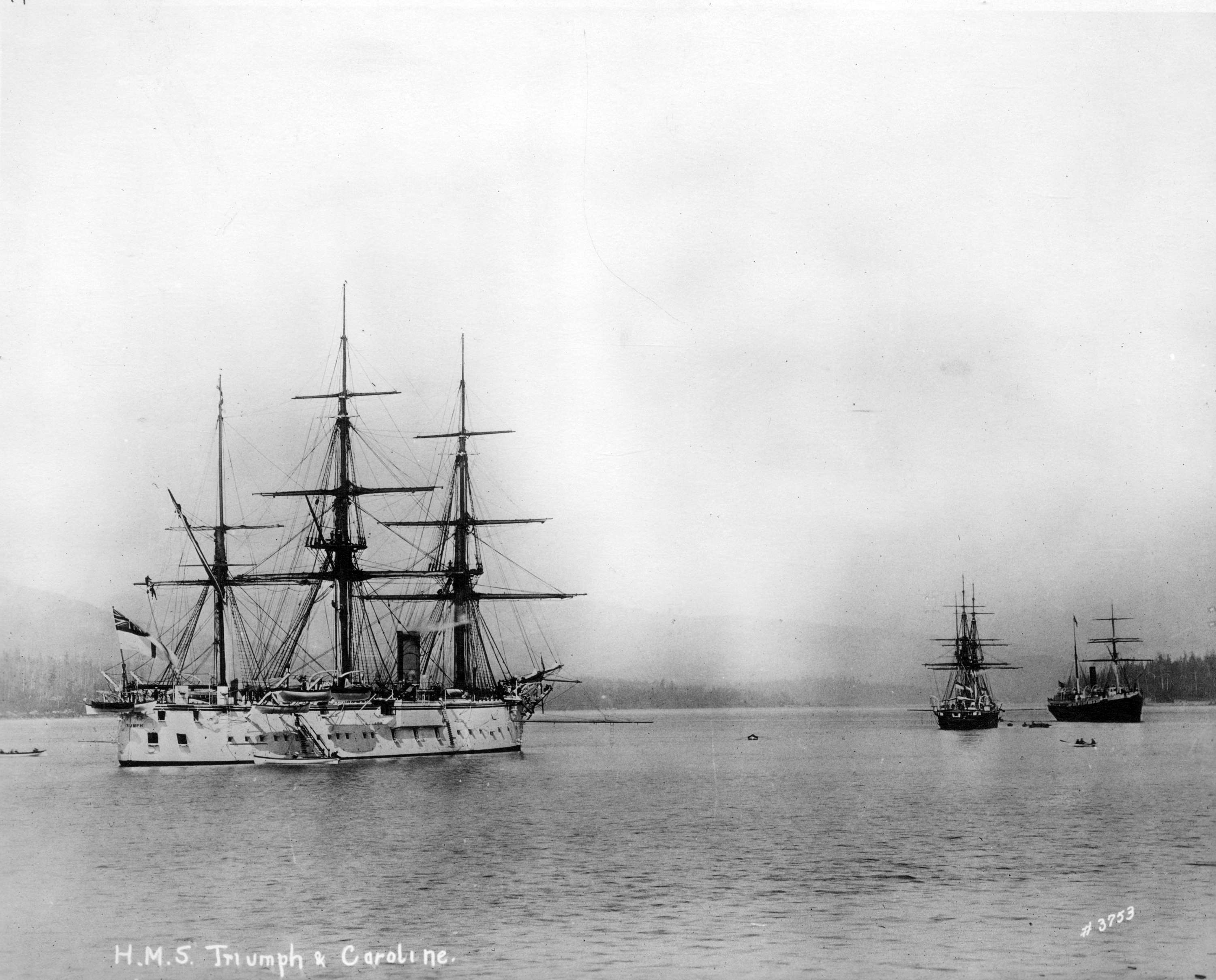
- Triumph (left), probably in Vancouver, 1887

Class overview
- Builders: Palmers Shipbuilding and Iron Company, Jarrow
- Operators: Royal Navy
- Preceded by: Audacious-class
- Built: 1868–1873
- In service: 1872–1921
- Completed: 2
- Scrapped: 2

General characteristics (as built)
- Type: Central-battery ironclad
- Displacement: 6,640–6,910 long tons (6,750–7,020 t)
- Length: 280 ft (85.3 m) (p/p)
- Beam: 55 ft (16.8 m)
- Draught: 25 ft (7.6 m)
- Installed power: 6 rectangular fire-tube boilers; 4,913–5,114 ihp (3,664–3,814 kW)
- Propulsion: 1 shaft; HRCR steam engine
- Sail plan: Ship-rigged
- Speed: 13.5 knots (25.0 km/h; 15.5 mph) (steam); 12.5 knots (23.2 km/h; 14.4 mph) (sail)
- Range: 1,640–1,680 nmi (3,040–3,110 km; 1,890–1,930 mi) at 10 knots (19 km/h; 12 mph)
- Complement: 450
- Armament: 10 × 9 in (229 mm) muzzle-loading rifles; 4 × 6 in (152 mm) muzzle-loading rifles; 6 × 20 pdr (3.75 in (95 mm)) saluting guns
- Armour: Waterline belt: 6–8 in (152–203 mm); Box battery: 4–6 in (102–152 mm); Bulkheads: 4–5 in (102–127 mm)

The Swiftsure class consisted of two central-battery ironclads built for the Royal Navy (RN) during the 1870s, HMS Swiftsure and HMS Triumph. They were specifically designed for service as flagships on the Pacific Station where coal was very expensive and they needed to minimise their use of coal by using their sails as often as possible. The sisters were completed in 1872–1873 and were briefly assigned to the Channel Fleet before being transferred to the Mediterranean Fleet where they spent most of the rest of the decade. They had a minor role in capturing a pair of rebel ships during the Spanish Cantonal Rebellion in 1873 and returning them to the central government. Swiftsure was one of the British ships that deterred the Russian Empire from attacking the Ottoman Empire's capital of Constantinople during the Russo-Turkish War of 1877–1878.

Triumph was the first of the sisters to serve as the Pacific Station flagship beginning in 1878 and they rotated the assignment between them at roughly three-year intervals until Swiftsure was relieved by a different ship in 1890. In between those times, they were usually refitted and spent several years in reserve. When the Pacific Fleet assignments ended in 1888–1890, the sisters spent some years as guardships, often as flagships of the local reserve forces. They were relegated to the reserves until 1901 when Swiftsure was hulked and converted into a storeship. She was renamed Orontes in 1904 and sold for scrap in 1908.

Unlike her sister, Triumph was assigned to serve as a depot ship in 1901 and was renamed Tenedos in 1904. She was converted into a mechanics training ship that same year and was renamed Indus IV in 1912. Two years later the ship was converted into a storeship and was renamed Algiers in 1915. The old ironclad was sold for scrap in 1921.

== Background and description ==
The Swiftsure class was designed by Edward Reed, the Chief Constructor of the RN. The ships were second-class ironclads intended for the Pacific Station where coal was very expensive so the ships' sailing qualities had to be equal to their performance under steam, while at the same time being stable ships and good gun platforms. At the design stage it had been suggested by the Committee on Designs that the ships should be built with their artillery mounted in two turrets, with some smaller guns positioned fore and aft. As there was at that time not sufficient experience with turret-mounted armament, and none at all with turrets in first-class battleships, the idea was rejected. The lines of the hull were based on that of the Defence-class ironclad, albeit with the latter's plough-shaped bow replaced by the pointed ram bow of the Audacious class. The shape of the stern was also modified with a narrower, elliptical shape which reduced topweight and hence improved stability. The RN had discovered that biofouling was worse on iron hulls than on wooden ones and without a British-controlled dockyard available on the station to clean the hull until the drydock at Esquimalt, Canada, was completed in 1886, the Swiftsures needed some sort of protection. Copper sheathing was the most resistant material to biofouling available, but the electrolytic effect between copper and iron prevented the copper from being directly attached to the iron hull so 6 inches (15 cm) of wood had to be used between them.

The ships were 280 feet (85.3 m) long between perpendiculars, a beam of 55 feet (16.8 m) and had a draught of 25 feet (7.6 m). The Swiftsure-class ships displaced 6,640–6,910 long tons (6,750–7,020 t) and had a tonnage of 3,893 tons burthen. Their hulls were divided into eight watertight compartments. They were fitted with a charthouse on the conning bridge that spanned the quarterdeck; voice tubes were used to communicate with the sailors manning the ship's wheel. They had a complement of 450 officers and ratings. All ranks were berthed on the main deck; berthing for seamen in previous classes had been on the lower deck. As the officers' accommodation was well ventilated and well lit, the ships were very popular.

The ships were fitted with a single two-cylinder, horizontal-return, connecting-rod steam engine built by Maudslay, Sons and Field that was rated at 800 nominal horsepower. It drove the shaft of the 23-foot-6-inch (7.16 m) propeller using steam provided by six rectangular fire-tube boilers. Swiftsure reached a speed of 13.8 knots (25.6 km/h; 15.9 mph) from 4,913 indicated horsepower (3,664 kW) during her sea trials while Triumph made 13.5 knots (25.0 km/h; 15.5 mph) from 5,114 ihp (3,814 kW) during hers. They carried 540–550 long tons (550–560 t) of coal to give them ranges of 1,640–1,680 nautical miles (3,040–3,110 km; 1,890–1,930 mi) at 10 knots (19 km/h; 12 mph).

The Swiftsure class was initially ship-rigged with three masts and had a sail area of 32,900 square feet (3,060 m^{2}), excluding stunsails. Around 1877–1878 they were re-rigged as barques with their sail area reduced to 22,750 square feet (2,114 m^{2}). To reduce drag, the funnel was telescopic and could be lowered and the propeller could be hoisted into the hull. Under sail alone, they could reach 12.5 knots (23.2 km/h; 14.4 mph).

=== Armament and armour ===
The main battery of the Swiftsure-class ships consisted of 10 RML 9-inch (229 mm) rifled muzzle-loading guns with the guns positioned amidships in a central-battery configuation just like that of the Audacious-class ships. Six of these were positioned on the main deck, three on each broadside, and the other four guns were mounted on the corners of the upper deck box battery. The battery protruded over the sides of the ships to give the guns a certain amount of end-on fire. The shell of the nine-inch gun weighed 254 pounds (115.2 kg) while the gun itself weighed 12 long tons (12 t). It had a muzzle velocity of 1,420 ft/s (430 m/s) and was rated with the ability to penetrate 11.3 inches (287 mm) of wrought-iron armour at the muzzle.

The ships were equipped with four RML 6-inch (152 mm) (71 cwt) (Note: "Cwt" is the abbreviation for hundredweight, 71 cwt referring to the weight of the gun.) guns as chase guns, two in the bow and another pair in the stern. They fired a 64-pound (29.0 kg), 6.3-inch (160 mm) shell. They also had six RBL 20-pounder (3.75 in (95 mm)) rifled breech-loading guns that were used as saluting guns. In 1880–1882, the ships received four 14-inch (356 mm) torpedo launchers on the main deck, two on each broadside; in 1882 the six-inch guns were replaced by four breech-loading BL five-inch (127 mm) guns in Triumph while Swiftsure received eight BL four-inch (102 mm) Mk I guns.

Triumph retained her RBL 20-pounder guns through 1886, although they had been repurposed as anti-torpedo boat guns. At that time the ship also had four quick-firing (QF) six-pounder (57 mm (2.2 in)) Hotchkiss guns, eight four-barrel 1-inch (25 mm) guns, and four five-barrel Gardner guns. Swiftsure had had her 20-pounders removed, but carried instead four QF six pounders, six 1-inch Nordenfelt guns, one five-barrel 0.45-inch (11 mm) Nordenfelt gun, and four Gardener guns. By 1890 Triumph's 20 pounders had been removed as had all the guns smaller than the six pounders. Their anti-torpedo boat battery consisted of a mix of six- and QF three-pounder (47 mm (1.9 in)) guns. Swiftsure had four of each type while her sister was equipped with eight apiece.

The armour scheme of the Swiftsures was identical to that of the Audacious class with the wrought-iron, waterline armour belt covering the entire length of the ships. It was eight inches (203 mm) thick amidships, backed by eight to ten inches (203 to 254 mm) of teak, and thinned to six inches towards the ends of the ships. It only protected the main deck and reached 4 feet (1 m) above the waterline at full load and 3 feet (0.9 m) below. The main deck citadel's ends were protected by a five-inch (127 mm) forward bulkhead and a four-inch one aft. The sides and embrasures of the upper battery were six inches thick, but its ends were unprotected. The bridge was fitted with a one-man conning tower with walls three inches (76 mm) thick.

== Ships ==
Construction data
Ship	Builder	Ordered	Laid down	Launched	Commissioned	Fate
Swiftsure	Palmers, Jarrow	1868	31 August 1868	15 June 1870	27 June 1872	Sold for scrap, 4 July 1908
Triumph	Palmers, Jarrow	1868	31 August 1868	27 September 1870	8 April 1873	Sold for scrap, 7 January 1921

== Service history ==
Swiftsure was commissioned in 1872 for an experimental cruise with the Channel Fleet. She proved to be the fasted ironclad under sail in the fleet during comparative trials; the only ship faster was the wooden frigate Aurora. She was then transferred to the Mediterranean Fleet later that same year. The ship was followed by Triumph the following year. In early 1873, the First Spanish Republic was beset with the Cantonal Revolution. The Royal Navy deployed a squadron that included Swiftsure off the southern coast of Spain in response. A small German squadron joined them in June that included the ironclad SMS Friedrich Carl.

A rebel faction of the Spanish Navy had seized four of the country's ironclads and the central government subsequently declared them to be pirates on 20 July. After Almería had rejected their demand to pay a ransom, the ironclad Vitoria and the frigate Almansa steamed towards Málaga. En route, the rebel ships were intercepted by Friedrich Carl and Swiftsure and forced to surrender. The rebel ships were taken to the outer port of Cartagena where the crews were released. With British crews aboard, they were then escorted by Swiftsure and Triumph to Gibraltar in early August where they were turned over to the central government on 26 September.

The sisters remained with the Mediterranean Fleet until Triumph returned home in 1877 for a refit that included converting her sail plan into barque rig. During the Russo-Turkish War, Swiftsure was one of the ironclads that Vice-Admiral Geoffrey Hornby led through the Dardanelles on 14–15 February 1878 to the Ottoman Empire's capital of Constantinople in a successful effort to intimidate the victorious Russian Empire from continuing their advance on the capital. Shortly afterward, Swiftsure was detached from the main body and stationed in the Gulf of Saros to deter any attempts by the Russians to outflank the Ottoman defences. She returned home shortly afterwards where she was refitted much like her sister.

In 1878, Triumph was sent out to relieve the flagship of the Pacific Station, the unarmoured frigate Shah, after the inconclusive Battle of Pacocha in May 1877 with the rebel Peruvian ironclad Huáscar demonstrated that an ironclad was needed on the station. Her sister had been in reserve since her refit was completed, but she replaced Triumph in October 1882. That ship had her boilers replaced upon her arrival home and was reduced to second-class reserve before she relieved Swiftsure in 1885. That ship was refitted in Devonport and had her boilers replaced before she was placed in reserve. The sisters again swapped positions in 1888.

Swiftsure's last time as flagship of the Pacific Station lasted until October 1890 and she served as the flagship of the Devonport Reserve until August 1891. The ship spent the next two years as a guardship before being reduced to Fleet Reserve. She was hulked in 1901 to serve as a storeship, renamed Orontes in March 1904 and sold for scrap on 4 July 1908.

Upon her return home in 1888, Triumph was assigned to the Devonport Reserve until she served as a guardship and flagship of the Senior Officer on the Coast of Ireland at Queenstown (modern Cobh), Ireland, from 1890 to 1892. The ship was transferred into the Fleet Reserve afterwards at Devonport and remained there until July 1900. Triumph was disarmed before she was reclassified as a depot ship for torpedo boat destroyers at Devonport in June 1901. The ship was only fully converted for her new role in 1904 and was renamed Tenedos in March of that year. She was towed to HM Dockyard, Chatham, upon completion of the conversion to serve as the core of the navy's mechanical training establishment (MTE) there. The RN decided that Chatham was too crowded to accommodate the ships and transferred the Tenedos to return to Devonport and join the MTE there as Indus IV in 1910. After the First World War began in August 1914, the ship was towed to Invergordon in October to serve as a storeship and was renamed Algiers in January 1915. After the war, she was sold for scrap in January 1921.
