= John McCrea (Royal Navy officer) =

Royal Navy admiral

Rear-Admiral John McCrea
- Born: 26 March 1829; Torpoint, Cornwall
- Died: 19 March 1883 (aged 53)
- Military career
- Allegiance: United Kingdom
- Branch: Royal Navy
- Rank: Rear-Admiral
- Commands: HMS Favourite; HMS Prince Consort; HMS Bellerophon; HMS Triumph; Malta Dockyard

Rear-Admiral John Dobree McCrea (26 March 1829 – 19 March 1883) was a Royal Navy officer who became admiral superintendent of the Malta Dockyard naval base.

== Naval career ==
Promoted to captain on 15 April 1862, McCrea became commanding officer of the corvette HMS Favourite in November 1867, commanding officer of the second-rate HMS Prince Consort in February 1871, commanding officer of the ironclad battleship HMS Bellerophon in November 1871, and commanding officer of the battleship HMS Triumph in March 1873. He went on to be Naval Officer in Charge at Gibraltar in January 1874 and, having been promoted to rear admiral on 30 December 1877, he became admiral superintendent of Malta Dockyard in June 1879 and admiral superintendent of Portsmouth Dockyard in May 1882.

Military offices
Preceded by William Luard	Admiral Superintendent, Malta Dockyard; 1879–1882	Succeeded by William Graham
