= Xerotine siccative =

Xerotine siccative was an oil drying agent used in the late 19th century. It is a type of terebene; unlike standard terebenes, xerotine siccative doesn't become cloudy when mixed in an oil. Replacing boiled oil, xerotine siccative was mixed with paint in order to speed up the drying process; however, its use ceased when it was discovered to be highly flammable.

The dangerous qualities of xerotine siccative were first discovered in an investigation of a small explosion on HMS Cockatrice in 1881. In November of the same year there was an explosion on HMS Triumph which killed three men and wounded seven more.

== Name ==
The words "xerotine" and "siccative" each mean "drier" in Greek and Latin respectively.

== Uses ==
As an oil dryer, xerotine siccative was mixed with oil based paints in order to speed the drying time of the paint.

== Initial investigations ==
The first evidence that xerotine siccative was a chief agent in the explosions on ships came from an investigation done on Cockatrice. It was discovered that before the explosion, a man entered the ship's storeroom with an open flame, which he held next to an uncorked can of xerotine siccative. Harry T. Grenfell reported that xerotine siccative had been supplied to the ship as a harmless substance and as a result, no precautions were taken towards it. Subsequent inquiries into an explosion aboard Triumph and HMS Doterel revealed that both resulted from explosions due to xerotine siccative.

After it was revealed that Triumph exploded as a result of gas generated by xerotine siccative, W.B. Baird, carpenter of Doterel, testified that he was supplied with the agent in an earthenware jar. He also stated that the painter of the ship reported that the jar had been damaged and was leaking and was ordered to dispose of the jar by throwing it overboard; shortly thereafter the explosion aboard Doterel occurred.

=== Results ===
In 1883, a committee, appointed by the Lords Commissioners of the Admiralty, released a report on the explosive power of xerotine siccative. Once the danger of xerotine siccative became known, the Commanders-in-Chief at the home ports and foreign stations and the Superintendents of the Dockyards were warned not to issue the substance to any future ships. All ships were also required to return any quantity of xerotine siccative that they had on board. At the same time, orders were given for the entire supply in store and on ships to be destroyed.

The Admiralty also took steps to prevent similar events from occurring in the future. No new compound could be administered until it had been examined chemically and any explosive nature was reported. Further precautions were taken in that labels stating "Inflammable—No Fire or Light to be brought near this Cask" were printed to be placed on any objects that posed a fire hazard. In addition, new specifications were created for any future cask or can holding flammable liquids.

After the investigations, boiled oil was once again used.

== Composition and flammability ==
Xerotine siccative contains kerosene as an ingredient. The most volatile substances in xerotine siccative were found to freely evaporate between 50 and 80 degrees Fahrenheit. Further, xerotine siccative contained Benzoline, which is very volatile at room temperature. Benzoline is flammable when it is present at one part benzoline vapor to 60 parts air and explosive when present at one part vapor to 30 parts air. On 2 October 1874, Benzoline was found to be the cause of an explosion on the canal boat Tilsbury. When the fumes were contained in an enclosed space, the behavior of the gas became similar to that of coal gas and could produce a similarly violent explosion.

== Known explosions ==
- Coquimbo (June 1880)
- HMS Doterel (26 April 1881)
- HMS Cockatrice (May 1881), Britomart-class steam gunboat
- HMS Triumph-2 (November 1881)

Xerotine siccative was also considered as a potential cause of the explosion which sank USS Maine in Havana harbour; however, it was ruled out by a later investigation.
