= HMS Favorite (1864) =

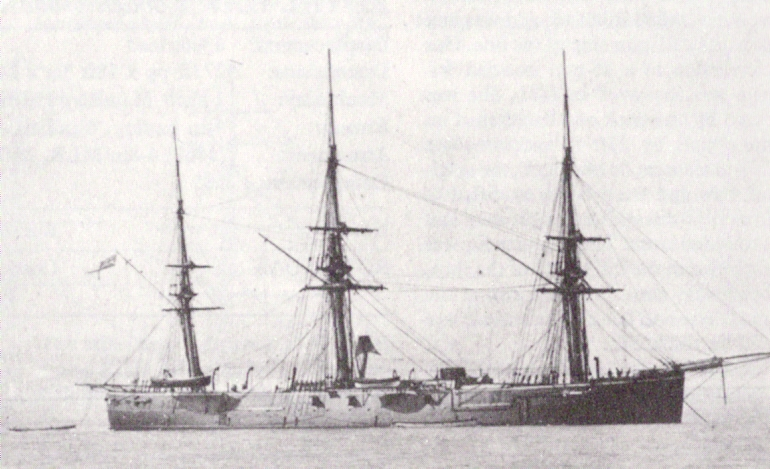
- Favorite in 1869 with her funnel lowered

History

United Kingdom
- Name: Favorite
- Laid down: 23 August 1860
- Launched: 5 July 1864
- Completed: 17 March 1866
- Fate: Sold to breakers, 30 March 1886

General characteristics
- Displacement: 3,232 long tons (3,284 t)
- Length: 225 ft (69 m)
- Beam: 46 ft 11 in (14.30 m)
- Draught: 22 ft 9 in (6.93 m) (deep load)
- Installed power: 1,770 ihp (1,320 kW)
- Propulsion: 1 shaft; direct-acting steam engine
- Sail plan: Ship-rigged, sail area 18,250 sq ft (1,695 m^{2})
- Speed: 11.8 knots (21.9 km/h; 13.6 mph) under power; 10.5 knots (19.4 km/h; 12.1 mph) under sail
- Complement: 250
- Armament: 1866 : 8 × 100 pdr Somerset cannon; 1869 : 8 × 7 in (178 mm) muzzle-loading rifles; 2 × 68 pdr smoothbore guns
- Armour: Box battery: 4.5 in (114 mm); Belt: 4.5 in; Bulkheads: 4.5 in

HMS Favorite was one of the three wooden warships of moderate dimension (the others being HMS Research and HMS Enterprise) selected by Sir Edward Reed for conversion to broadside ironclads in response to the increased tempo of French warship building during the early 1860s.

== Background and design ==
Favorite was named after a French prize-of-war, and hence her name is spelled in the French way. She was laid down as a corvette of 22 guns of the Jason class, and was selected for conversion after being two years on the builder's slipway. The hull form was already complete, so modifications were restricted to the installation of a rounded stern and a straight stem in place of the traditional overhanging stern and knee bow.

She carried her armour in a box battery amidships, and the guns carried therein, four on each side, were the heaviest naval cannon of the day. A degree of axial (fore and aft) fire was enabled through an arrangement in which part of the battery wall could be recessed, and one of the guns could be traversed around, about its own axis, to fire through the space thus produced.

She was regarded as a good sea-boat, but rolled more than most; her armament could therefore only have been fought in smooth water, and the movement of the forward or after guns to fire through the axial recesses would have been hazardous in the extreme in anything other than smooth water.

== Service history ==
She was commissioned at Sheerness for the North America and West Indies station, returning home in August 1869 for refit. She was First Reserve guardship on the east coast of Scotland from 1872 to 1876, in succession to HMS Repulse. On 3 August 1875, she ran aground on the Scroby Sands, Norfolk. She was refloated and found to be undamaged. She paid off at Portsmouth in 1876 and was laid up until sold.
