= RBL 20-pounder Armstrong gun =

RBL 20-pounder gun
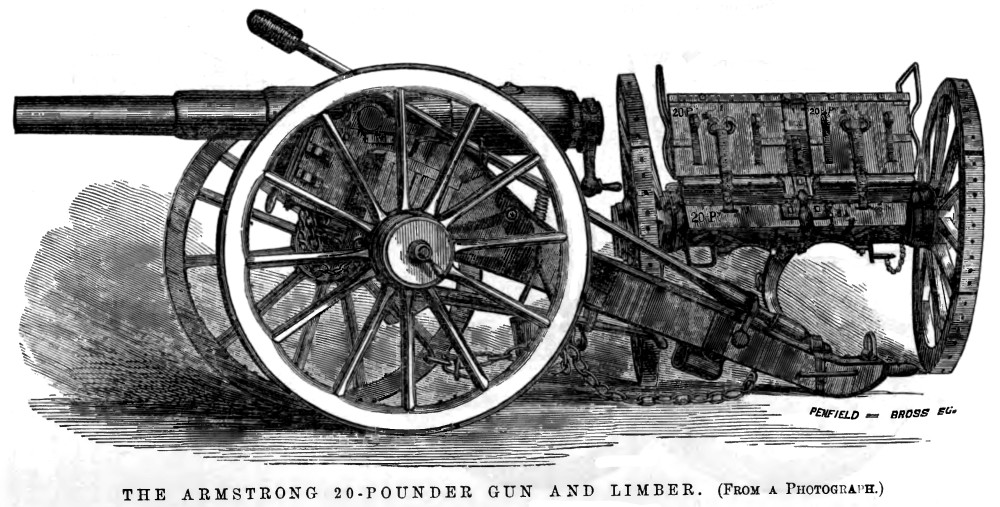
- 16 cwt field gun with limber
- Type: Naval gun Field gun
- Place of origin: United Kingdom

Service history
- In service: 1859 – 19??
- Used by: British Empire

Production history
- Designer: W.G. Armstrong Co.
- No. built: 412
- Variants: 13, 15 and 16 cwt (Note: cwt = long hundredweight = 112 pounds = 51 kg. Hence the 3 models weighed 1456 pounds (660 kg), 1680 pounds (762 kg) and 1792 pounds (813 kg))

Specifications
- Mass: Naval : 13 long hundredweight (660 kg) or 15 long hundredweight (760 kg); Field : 16 long hundredweight (810 kg)
- Barrel length: Naval : 54 inches (1.372 m); Field : 84 inches (2.134 m) bore & chamber
- Shell: 21 pounds 13 ounces (9.894 kg)
- Calibre: 3.75-inch (95.2 mm)
- Breech: Armstrong screw with vertical sliding vent-piece (block)
- Muzzle velocity: Naval : 1,000 feet per second (300 m/s); Field : 1,130 feet per second (340 m/s)
- Effective firing range: 3,400 yards (3,100 m)

The Armstrong Breech Loading 20-pounder gun, later known as RBL 20-pounder, was an early modern 3.75-inch rifled breech-loading light gun of 1859.

== History ==
The gun was effectively a larger version of the successful RBL 12 pounder 8 cwt Armstrong gun. There were different versions for land and sea service.

=== Sea service ===
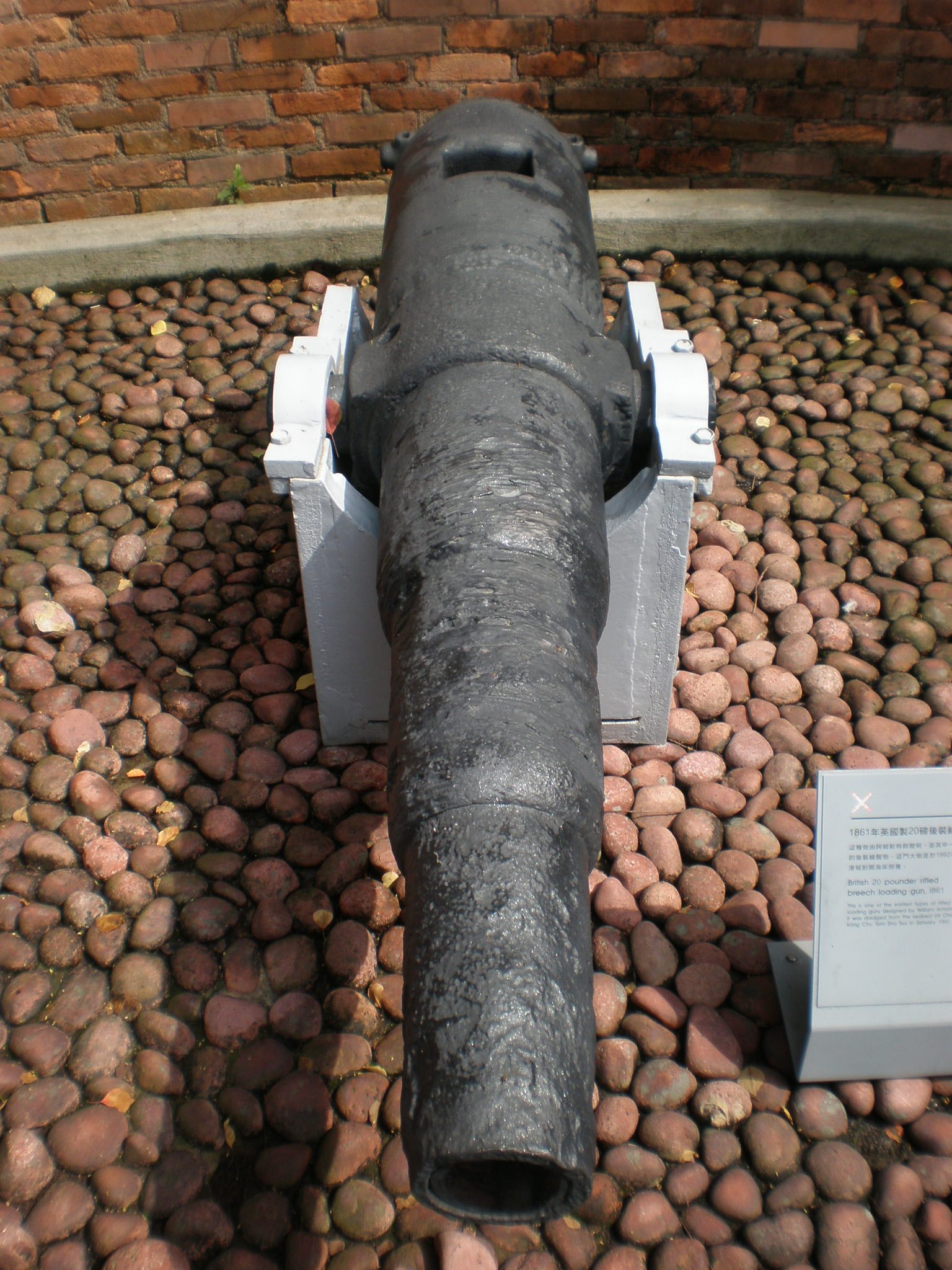
13 cwt boat gun at Hong Kong Museum of Coastal Defence

The RBL 20 pounder of 13 cwt and 15 cwt for sea service was introduced in 1859. It is 2½ feet shorter than the land version giving it a bore of only 54 inches (14.43 calibres), and hence a short stubby appearance. Its short barrel only allowed it to attain a muzzle velocity of 1,000 ft/second.

The 15 cwt gun, identifiable by the raised coil in front of the vent slot, was intended for broadside use in sloops. The more lightly constructed 13 cwt gun was known as a pinnace gun and was intended for boat use.

=== Land service ===
The RBL 20 pounder of 16 cwt for land service was introduced in 1860. It has a bore of 84 inches (22.36 calibres) and hence has the appearance of a typical field gun. After it became obsolete for regular Royal Artillery use, a small number were re-issued to Volunteer Artillery Batteries of Position from 1889, alongside 16-pounder RML guns and 40 Pounder RBL guns. The 1893 the War Office Mobilisation Scheme shows the allocation of twelve Artillery Volunteer position batteries equipped with 20 Pounder guns which would be concentrated in Epping, Essex in the event of mobilisation.

== Surviving examples ==
- An unrestored 13 cwt pinnace gun at Hong Kong Museum of Coastal Defence
- A 16 cwt gun on board HMS Warrior at Portsmouth, UK
- A 13 cwt gun dated 1859 at the Artillery Museum, North Head, Sydney, Australia
- Sea Service Pattern at Explosion! Museum of Naval Firepower, Gosport

== See also ==
- Armstrong gun
- List of field guns
- List of naval guns

== Bibliography ==
- Treatise on the construction and manufacture of ordnance in the British service. War Office, UK, 1877
- Text Book of Gunnery, 1887. London : Printed for his Majesty's Stationery Office, by Harrison and Sons, St. Martin's Lane
- Alexander Lyman Holley, A treatise on Ordnance and Armor published by D Van Nostrand, New York, 1865
- Jones, Colin (1999). "'Disarmed and Disappointed'? The Experience of the Armstrong Breech-loading Guns, 1863–1864". Mariner's Mirror. 85 (2): 205–212. doi:10.1080/00253359.1999.10656742. ISSN 0025-3359.
- Lieutenant-Colonel C H Owen R.A., The principles and practice of modern artillery, published by John Murray, London, 1873
