= Box battery =

Late 19th century battleship armament style

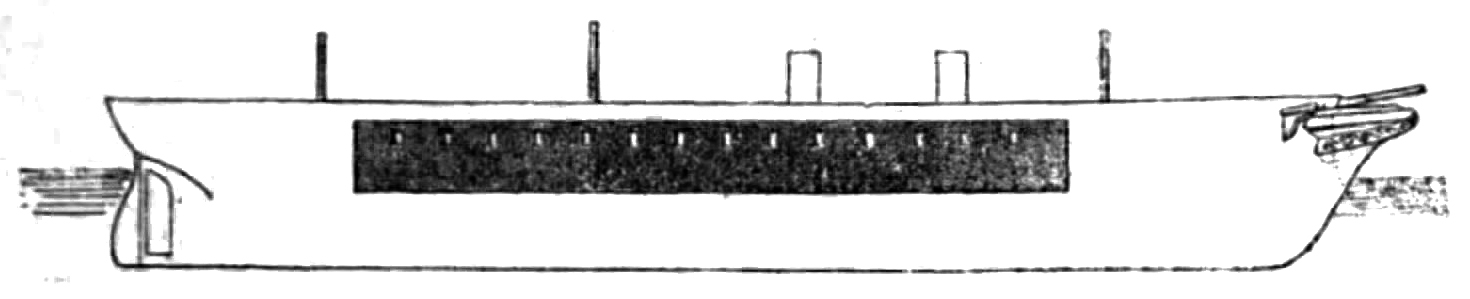
HMS Warrior (1860), with the armoured citadel shaded

The box battery is a disposition of the main armament in a battleship, commonly used in ships built in the latter half of the 19th century. A box battery consists of a thick armour surrounding a central battery to protect the guns. It was an interim disposition between full-length broadside guns and turret-mounted artillery.

== Description ==
From the first time that artillery was carried aboard warships, in the early Tudor period, until the middle of the 19th century, warships had carried their cannon in long rows along their sides. Bigger ships had carried more and bigger cannon, culminating in wooden line-of-battle ships carrying some 140 muzzle-loading smoothbore cannon, 70 on each side.

With the advent of steam power, iron armour, and vastly larger guns, first-line battleships built from 1860 onwards tended to carry fewer but heavier guns. The first broadside ironclad to be commissioned into the Royal Navy was HMS Warrior. She carried a relatively small number of guns compared to the wooden ships that preceded her, but could have destroyed any of them in combat. Warrior carried twenty guns on each side. As artillery manufacturers produced heavier and heavier guns, warships carried fewer and fewer of them. The ultimate designs of broadside ironclads allowed for only ten or twelve heavy guns to be carried.

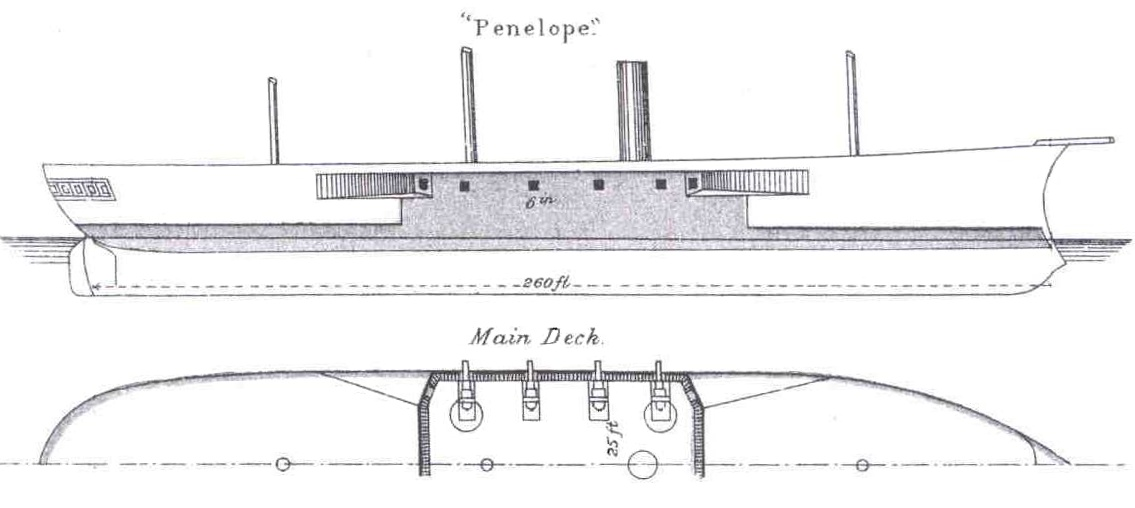
HMS Penelope (1867), with a central box battery

A ship at sea moves in response to the waves it encounters; the ends move more than the centre. It followed that if a warship were to mount only a small number of guns, it would make sense to mount them centrally, where the movement of the ship was minimal. Having mounted the artillery in this central position, it also made sense to concentrate the armour of the ship around the guns, along with the engines and the command centre. It was felt unnecessary to armour the ends, superstructure, or the funnels.

== See also ==
- Central battery ship
