= James Steuart (Royal Navy officer) =

Admiral of the Fleet James Steuart
- Born: 1678; Ireland
- Died: 30 March 1757 (aged 78–79); Lower Brook Street, London
- Military career
- Allegiance: Kingdom of Great Britain
- Branch: Royal Navy
- Service years: 1697–1757
- Rank: Admiral of the Fleet
- Commands: HMS Greyhound; HMS Dartmouth; HMS Aldborough; HMS Royal Anne; HMS Cumberland
- Conflicts: War of the Spanish Succession; Jacobite rising War of the Austrian Succession

Admiral of the Fleet James Steuart (1678 – 30 March 1757) was a Royal Navy officer. After his father died at the Siege of Derry, Steuart and his siblings were brought up by their uncle and aunt, who were wealthy and politically well connected.

Steuart commanded the fourth-rate HMS Greyhound during the War of the Spanish Succession and then commanded the sixth-rate HMS Aldborough off the Scottish coast during the Jacobite rising.

Steuart became second-in-command of a fleet of 25 British and Dutch ships dispatched to rescue a British squadron and convoy which had been trapped in the Tagus by a French Brest squadron during the War of the Austrian Succession. The British and Dutch fleet was successful in driving off the French, who retired in the face of the superior British and Dutch fleet without firing a shot.

== Early career ==
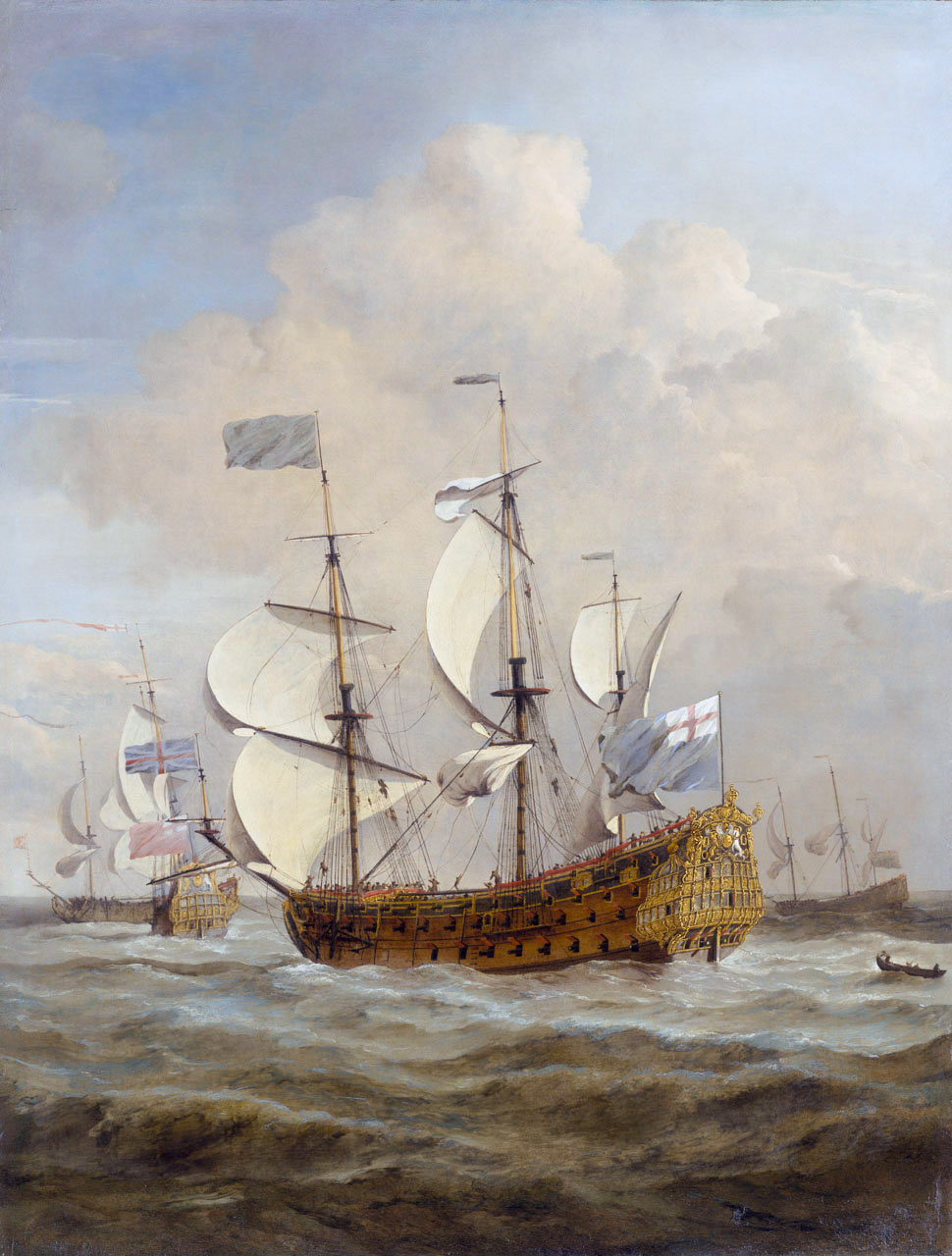
The Royal galley HMS Royal Anne which Steuart commanded when escorting King George I on his return from Hanover in 1717

Born of the seven children of Captain James Steuart who was killed fighting for King William's Army at the Siege of Derry in Spring 1689, Steuart and his siblings were adopted by their uncle, General Sir William Steuart and his first wife Katherine FitzGerald, Viscountess Grandison, grandmother of Prime Minister Pitt the Elder. His twice married but childless uncle subsequently chose Steuart to be the executor of his will.

Steuart joined the Royal Navy as a volunteer in 1697 at the age of nineteen, and his exams passed for lieutenant in December 1701, at the age of twenty three. Promoted to captain on 14 January 1709, he was given command of the fourth-rate HMS Greyhound during the War of the Spanish Succession. He was later given command of the fourth-rate HMS Dartmouth in the Mediterranean Fleet and then of the sixth-rate HMS Aldborough off the Scottish coast during the Jacobite rising. He then commanded the Royal galley HMS Royal Anne when she formed part of Admiral Matthew Aylmer's squadron escorting King George I on his return from Hanover in 1717.

In 1726, acting as executor under his uncle's will, Steuart applied 5,000 Irish pounds to endow St George's School in Hanover Square.

Stuart was given command of the third-rate HMS Cumberland in the Channel in November 1740. In HMS Cumberland he escorted the third-rate HMS Prince of Orange and the fourth-rate HMS Superb to Lisbon as part of protection duties during the War of the Austrian Succession. He was elected member of parliament for Weymouth and Melcombe Regis in 1741 and while still in command of HMS Cumberland, he sailed for the West Indies early in 1742.

== Senior command ==
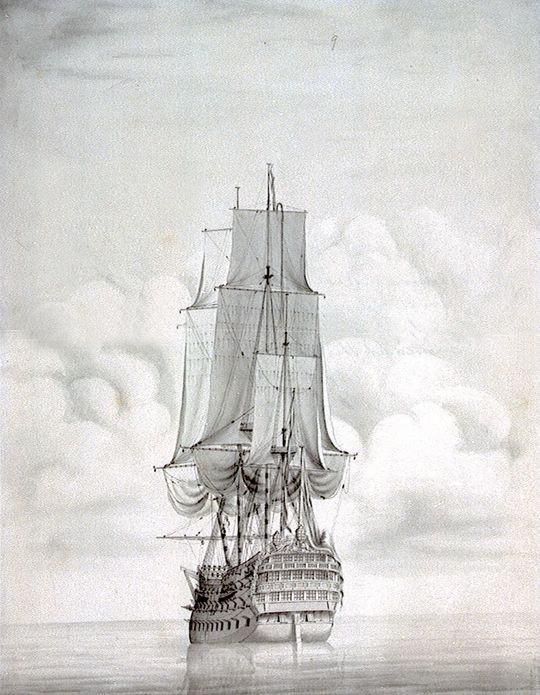
The second-rate HMS Duke, Steuart's flagship as second-in-command of a fleet dispatched to rescue a British squadron and convoy which had been trapped in the Tagus

Steuart was promoted to rear-admiral on 10 April 1742. With his flag in the second-rate HMS Duke, he became second-in-command of a fleet of 25 British and Dutch ships despatched under the command of Admiral Sir John Balchen to rescue a British squadron and convoy under Vice-Admiral Sir Charles Hardy, which had been trapped in the Tagus by a French Brest squadron: the British and Dutch fleet was successful in driving off the French, who retired in the face of the superior British and Dutch fleet without firing a shot, and Hardy's convoy was escorted safely to Gibraltar.

Promoted to vice-admiral on 23 June 1744, Steuart went on to be Port Admiral at Portsmouth in 1745. Promoted to full admiral on 15 July 1747 and to Admiral of the Fleet on 22 November 1750, he died at his house on Lower Brook Street, adjacent to Hanover Square, in London on 30 March 1757.

== Family ==
Steuart married Anne (who died in 1741); they had one son, also called James.

== Sources ==
- Harding, Richard (2013). The Emergence of Britain's Global Naval Supremacy: The War of 1739-1748. Boydell Press. ISBN 978-1843838234.
- Heathcote, Tony (2002). The British Admirals of the Fleet 1734–1995. Pen & Sword. ISBN 0-85052-835-6.
- Chester, Joseph (1876). The marriage, baptismal, and burial registers of the collegiate church or abbey of St. Peter, Westminster. London.

Parliament of Great Britain
Preceded by John Tucker; John Olmius; Thomas Pearse; George Dodington	Member of Parliament for Weymouth and Melcombe Regis; 1741–1747; With: John Tucker; John Raymond; Joseph Damer	Succeeded by Welbore Ellis; Richard Plumer; George Dodington; Edward Hungate Beaghan
Military offices
Preceded by Sir Chaloner Ogle	Admiral of the Fleet; 1751–1757	Succeeded by George Clinton
