= Cornelius Mitchell =

Royal Navy officer

Captain Cornelius Mitchell
- Died: 1749
- Military career
- Allegiance: Kingdom of Great Britain
- Branch: Royal Navy
- Rank: Captain
- Commands: HMS Larke; HMS Rochester; HMS Buckingham; HMS Kent; HMS Adventure; Jamaica Station

Captain Cornelius Mitchell (died 1749) was a Royal Navy officer who served as Commander-in-Chief of the Jamaica Station.

== Naval career ==
Mitchell was promoted to post captain on 14 June 1731 on appointment to the command of the fourth-rate HMS Larke. He transferred to the command of the fourth-rate HMS Rochester in August 1739, of the third-rate HMS Buckingham in October 1740, of the third-rate HMS Kent in 1741 and of the fourth-rate HMS Adventure in 1744. He was accused of failing to pursue a French squadron when in charge of a superior force in August 1746 and, although he served briefly as Commander-in-Chief of the Jamaica Station in 1746, he was tried by court-martial and sentenced to be cashiered and "rendered incapable of ever being employed in his Majesty's service" in January 1748.

== Sources ==
- Cundall, Frank (1915). Historic Jamaica. West India Committee.
- Mahan, Alfred (1890). Influence of Sea Power upon History. Little, Brown & Co.

Military offices
Preceded by Thomas Davers	Commander-in-Chief, Jamaica Station; 1746	Succeeded by Digby Dent
