= Richard Stacey =

English shipbuilder and ship designer

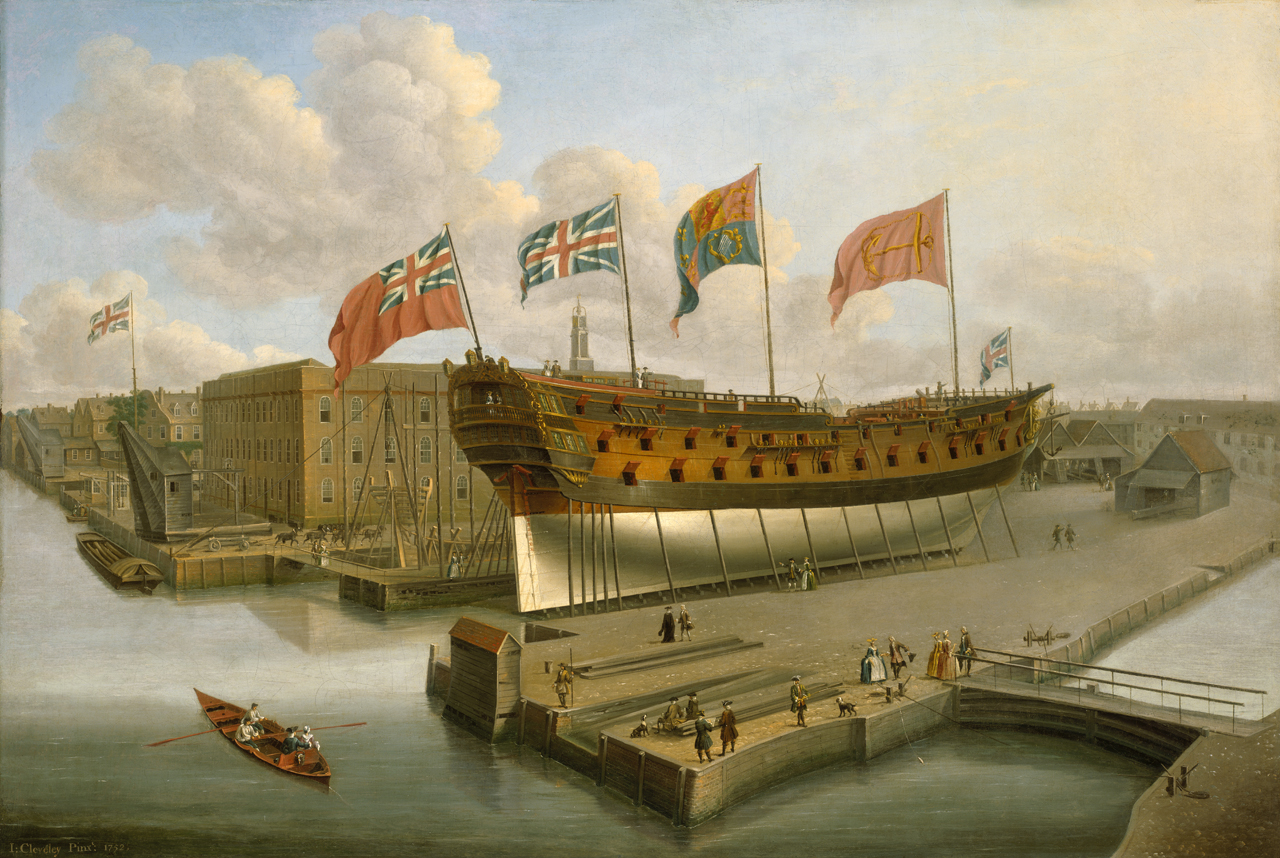
Deptford Dockyard c.1730 with a ship on the stocks: possibly the 70-gun HMS Buckingham

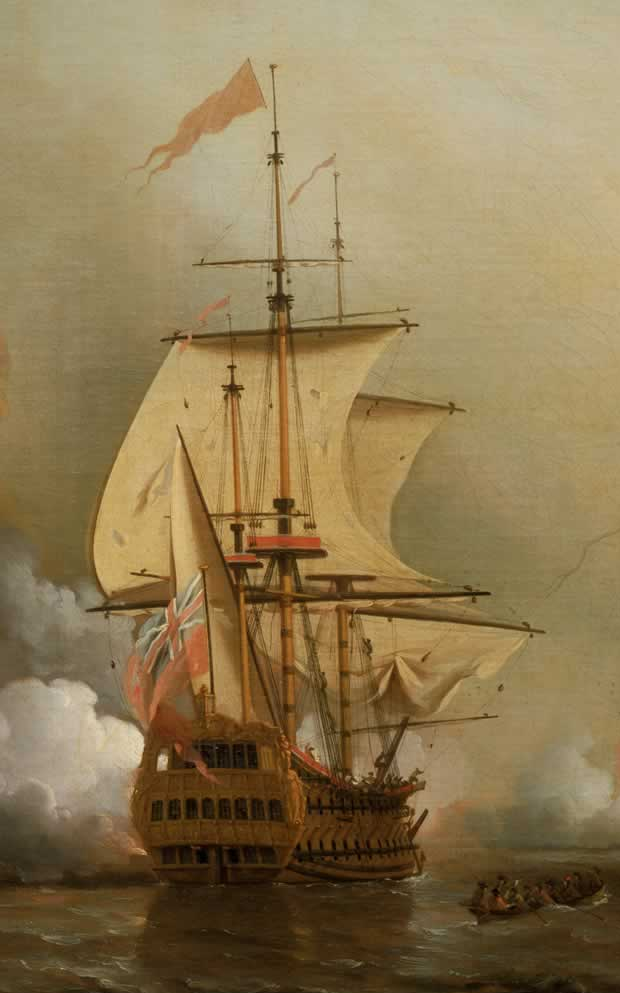
HMS Expedition

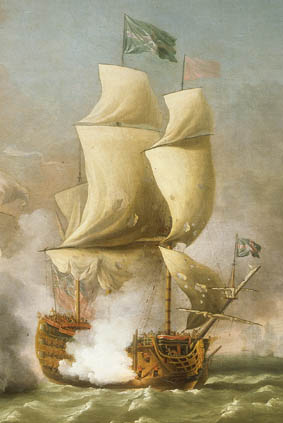
HMS Barfleur

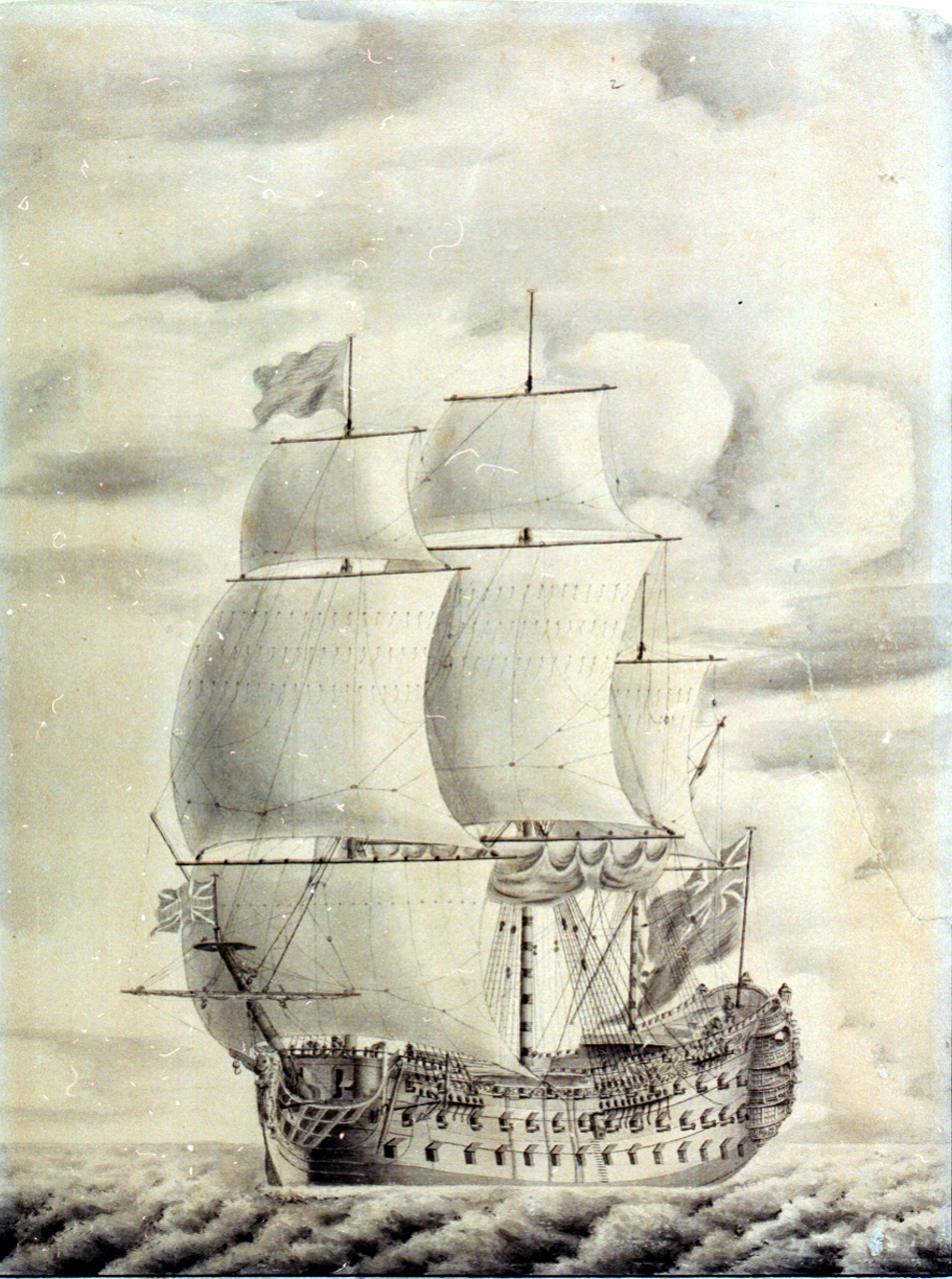
HMS Prince George

Richard Stacey (c. 1663–1743) was an English shipbuilder and ship designer employed by the Royal Navy at several dockyards but predominantly Deptford.

== Life ==
He was probably apprenticed as a shipwright around 1677. He was appointed a master mastmaker and boat-builder at Plymouth Dockyard by the Royal Navy in November 1695.

In 1698 he transferred briefly to Kinsale where he launched HMS Kinsale at Cork Docks in Ireland. He then worked for a few months at Sheerness Dockyard in 1705 before being appointed Master Shipwright at Woolwich Dockyard in November 1705.

He was personally responsible for designing the Flamborough class of ship in 1706. In 1708/9 he designed HMS Delight (1709) in Woolwich but this was completed by Jacob Ackworth as in August 1709 Stacey was appointed master shipwright at Portsmouth Dockyard one of the most important in Britain and created a large number of vessels there. In July 1715 he moved to be Master of Deptford Dockyard the most important in Britain at that time. In 1721 he designed the Cruizer class ship and in 1725 the sloop HMS Happy. His Royal warrant to design and build ships was renewed in 1727.

In 1731 he designed HMS Wolf and in 1732 HMS Hound.

He died on 16 June 1743. He is buried in the floor of the nave of St John the Baptist church in Sutton-at-Hone near Dartford in Kent.

== Ships built ==
- HMS Chichester (1706) 80-gun ship of the line at Chatham Dockyard
- HMS Elizabeth (1706) 70-gun ship of the line at Portsmouth Dockyard
- HMS Flamborough (1707) 24-gun ship launched at Woolwich Dockyard
- HMS Gosport (1707) 42-fun frigate built at Woolwich Dockyard
- HMS Squirrel (1707) 24-gun ship at Woolwich Dockyard
- HMS Falmouth (1708) 54-gun ship of the line built at Woolwich Dockyard
- HMS Royal Anne 42-gun galley built at Woolwich Dockyard
- HMS Fowey (1709) 42-gun frigate built at Portsmouth Dockyard
- HMS Dolphin (1711) 36-gun ship built at Portsmouth Dockyard
- HMS Solebay (1711) 24-gun ship built at Portsmouth Dockyard
- HMS Launceston (1711) 42-gun frigate built at Portsmouth Dockyard
- HMS Seahorse (1712) 24-gun ship built at Portsmouth Dockyard
- HMS Success (1712) 42-gun ship built at Portsmouth Dockyard
- HMS Dorsetshire (1712) rebuilding of 80-gun ship of the line built at Northam, Devon
- HMS Expedition (1714) second rebuild of 70-gun ship of the line built at Portsmouth Dockyard
- HMS Rochester (1716) 54-gun ship of the line built at Deptford Dockyard
- HMS Speedwell (1716) 42-gun ship built at Deptford Dockyard
- HMS Barfleur (1716) 90-gun ship of the line built at Deptford Dockyard
- HMS Medway (1718) 60-gun ship of the line built at Deptford Dockyard
- HMS Dursley Galley 20-gun frigate built at Deptford Dockyard
- HMS Greyhound (1719) 20-gun frigate built at Deptford Dockyard
- HMS Torbay (1719) 80-gun ship of the line built at Deptford Dockyard
- HMS Nottingham (1719) 60-gun ship of the line built at Deptford Dockyard
- HMS Blandford (1720) 20-gun frigate built at Deptford Dockyard
- HMS Falkland (1720) 50-gun ship of the line built at Deptford Dockyard
- HMS Lyme (1720) 20-gun frigate built at Deptford Dockyard
- HMS Katherine (1721) 8-gun yacht built at Deptford Dockyard
- HMS Bonetta (1721) 4-gun sloop built at Deptford Dockyard
- HMS Otter (1721) 6-gun sloop built at Deptford Dockyard
- HMS Chatham (1721) 50-gun ship of the line built at Deptford Dockyard
- HMS Cruizer (1721) 8-gun sloop built at Deptford Dockyard
- HMS Burford (1722) 70-gun ship of the line built at Deptford Dockyard
- HMS Scarborough (1722) 20-gun frigate built at Deptford Dockyard
- HMS Spence (1723) 8-gun sloop built at Deptford Dockyard
- HMS Diamond (1723) 40-gun ship of the line built at Deptford Dockyard
- HMS Berwick (1723) 70-gun ship of the line built at Deptford Dockyard
- HMS Shark (1723) 10-gun sloop built at Deptford Dockyard
- HMS Prince George (1723) 90-gun ship of the line at Chatham Dockyard a huge ship with a crew of 750
- HMS Seaford (1724) 20 gun frigate built at Deptford Dockyard
- HMS Happy (1725) 10 gun sloop built at Deptford Dockyard
- HMS Romney (1726) 50-gun ship of the line built at Deptford Dockyard
- HMS Pearl (1726) 40-gun ship of the line built at Deptford Dockyard
- HMS Gibraltar (1727) 20 gun frigate built at Deptford Dockyard
- HMS Fox (1727) 20 gun frigate built at Deptford Dockyard
- Mary, 8 gun yacht built at Deptford Dockyard
- HMS Drake (1729) 8 gun sloop built at Deptford Dockyard
- HMS Torrington (1729) 40-gun ship built at Deptford Dockyard
- HMS Namur (1729) 90-gun ship of the line built at Deptford Dockyard a huge ship with crew of 750
- HMS Windsor (1729) 60-gun ship of the line built at Deptford Dockyard
- HMS Spence (1730) 8 gun sloop built at Deptford Dockyard
- HMS Terrible (1730) 6 gun bomb vessel built at Deptford Dockyard
- HMS Buckingham (1731) 70-gun ship of the line built at Deptford Dockyard
- HMS Sheerness (1732) 20 gun frigate built at Deptford Dockyard
- HMS Dolphin (1732) 20 gun frigate built at Deptford Dockyard
- HMS Tartar (1734) 20 gun frigate built at Deptford Dockyard
- HMS Prince of Orange (1734) 70-gun ship of the line built at Deptford Dockyard
- HMS Eltham (1736) 40 gun ship built at Deptford Dockyard
- HMS Kennington (1736) 20 gun ship built at Deptford Dockyard
- HMS Lion (1738) 60-gun ship of the line built at Deptford Dockyard
- HMS Boyne (1739) 80-gun ship of the line built at Deptford Dockyard
- HMS Woolwich (1741) 50 gun ship of the line built at Deptford Dockyard
- HMS Revenge (1742) 70-gun ship of the line built at Deptford Dockyard

== Richard Stacey the Younger ==
As works (in Portsmouth) continue in Stacey's name after his death it may be assumed that these are by his son. These include:

- HMS Prince Frederick (1740) 70 gun ship of the line built at Portsmouth Dockyard
- HMS Royal William (1757) 84 gun ship of the line built at Portsmouth Dockyard

== Family ==
He was married to Christian (1677-1713). They had a daughter, Elizabeth.
