= HMS Aldborough (1706) =

Warship of the Royal Navy

History

Great Britain
- Name: HMS Aldborough
- Builder: William Johnson, Blackwall
- Launched: 6 March 1706
- Acquired: 2 January 1706
- Commissioned: March 1706
- Out of service: 29 March 1727
- Fate: Broken up, Portsmouth dockyard

General characteristics
- Class & type: 24-gun sixth-rate
- Tons burthen: 28777/94 bm
- Length: 94 ft 3 in (28.7 m) gundeck; 74 ft 11 in (22.8 m) keel for tonnage
- Beam: 26 ft 10.5 in (8.2 m)
- Depth of hold: 11 ft 1.5 in (3.4 m)
- Propulsion: Sail
- Sail plan: ship-rigged
- Complement: 115
- Armament: 20 × 6-pdrs on upper deck; 4 × 4-pdrs guns on quarterdeck

General characteristics As Rebuilt 1727
- Class & type: 20=gun, Sixth Rate
- Tons burthen: 37490/94 bm
- Length: 106 ft 0 in (32.31 m) gundeck; 87 ft 9.75 in (26.7653 m) keel for tonnage
- Beam: 28 ft 4 in (8.64 m) maximum
- Depth of hold: 9 ft 2 in (2.79 m)
- Sail plan: ship-rigged
- Armament: 20 × 6-pdrs on upper deck

HMS Aldborough was a 24-gun sixth-rate ship of the Royal Navy, purchased in 1706 and in service in Mediterranean and English waters until 1727 when she was rebuilt as a 374 ton (builder's measure) sixth rate in accordance with the 1719 Establishment for Sixth Rates. After the rebuild she spent her career in the West Indies, Home Waters and the Mediterranean. She was finally broken at Deptford on 31 March 1742.

Aldborough was the second named vessel since it was used for a 10-gun ketch. launched by Johnson of Aldeburgh on 6 May 1691 and accidentally blown up on 17 August 1698.

== Specifications and Construction ==
Initially intended for merchant service, the as yet unnamed vessel was purchased for naval use while still under construction at London's Blackwall Yard on 2 January 1706. She was registered as a naval vessel on 26 February. She was launched on 6 March 1706. Her gundeck was 94 feet 3 inches (28.7 metres) with her keel 74 feet 11 inches (22.8 metres) reported for tonnage. Her breadth was 26 feet 10.5 inches (8.2 metres). Her depth of hold was 11 feet 1.5 inches (3.4 metres). The vessel measured 28777/94 tons burthen. She carried a standardised armament of twenty 6-pounders on the upper deck (UD) and four 4-pounders on the quarterdeck. She was a full rigged ship.

== Commissioned service ==
Colonel John Lovett in 1708 identified four men of war in this picture as the Roebuck, 42 guns, on the left, along with the Charles Galley, 36 guns, Swallow, 32 guns, and the ketch Aldborough, 24 guns, on the right; all were ships which attended on the construction of the Eddystone lighthouse, those beyond bear the flags of the countries who contributed financially to the project. Plymouth Harbour is in the background

She was commissioned as Aldborough in March 1706 under the command of Commander Beaumont Waldron, RN. Initially she was recorded as being off Ostend, then assigned as part of the British presence in the Mediterranean in 1707. In 1708 she was in the English Channel escorting convoys. On 11 April 1708 she engaged and captured the French privateer Le Postillon. In December 1709 she was under Captain Thomas Ekines, RN. On 28 April 1710 she captured another privateer, La Genevieve de Bonne Esperance. On 28 August 1711 she ran down and seized a third French ship, Le Desmarais. In 1711 she was at Glasgow, Scotland. Despite Aldborough's victories, Ekines was dismissed as her captain in June 1712, and replaced by Captain Joseph Thornton for service in the Mediterranean in 1713.

Eight years of active service had reduced Aldborough's seaworthiness, and in 1714 she underwent an expensive refit and repair at Portsmouth Dockyard at a cost of 1,268.8.41/2d. She returned to sea in 1715 under Captain Charles Stewart, RN, whose orders were to patrol the waters surrounding Scotland and Ireland. A further refit was required at Plymouth dockyard in the summer of 1717 at a cost of 1,304.10.71/4d, after which Aldborough returned to her previous coastal patrol. In 1719 she was under command of Captain Thomas Lawrence, RN.

== Rebuild at Portsmouth 1727 ==
She was docked at Portsmouth for dismantling in preparation to rebuild on 29 March 1727 as a 374 ton (builder's measure) 20 gun sixth rate under the guidance of the Portsmouth Master Shipwright, Joseph Allin. Her keel was considered laid when she was placed in the dock and dismantling was commenced. She was ordered to be rebuilt on 12 April then again on 27 April 1727. She was relaunched on 21 October 1727. Her dimensions were now gundeck of 106 feet 0 inches (32.3 metres) with her keel 87 feet 9.75 inches (26.8 metres). Her breadth was 28 feet 4 inches (8.6 metres). Her depth of hold was 9 feet 2 inches (2.8 metres). She measured 37490/94 tons burthen.. She carried armament of twenty 6-pounders on the upper deck (UD). She was a full rigged ship. She was completed for sea on 12 March 1728 at a cost of 4,657.13.2dfor fitting.

== Commissioned Service after Rebuild ==
Aldborough was commissioned in March 1728 under the command of Captain Edward Barker, RN for survey work in the West Indies. In early 1729 he was replaced by Captain John Gascoigne, RN. After about six years in the West Indies the ship returned to Deptford Dockyard to pay off in July 1734 for refit and repair. After years in tropical waters had taken their toll with extensive work required to restore her hull and timbers. Refitting continued until June 1735 at a cost of £5,417.

She was commissioned in May 1735 under the command of Captain Nicholas Robinson, RN for service in the English Channel and North Sea. She was paid off in 1736 for a small repair at Sheerness at a cost of 259.18.2d. Her repair was complete in January 1737. By Admiralty Order 16 August 1737 she was converted to a fireship with 8 guns manned by 55 men at a cost of 1,546.0.1d for fitting. The conversion was carried out at Deptford between August and December 1737. However, In early 1738 she was ordered to be converted back into a 20-gun sixth rate ship. She was commissioned in August 1738 under the command of Captain George Pocock, RN for service in the Mediterranean.

She was deployed as a privateer hunter, capturing a Spanish barque on 28 January 1739 and taking part in the capture of two more vessels in June. She was less successful in 1740, cruising for several weeks off the coast of Malta without encountering enemy craft. In January 1741 she was part of the British fleet at Port Mahon off the coast of Spain.

== Disposition ==
She was broken at Deptford on 31 March 1742.
