= Thomas Davers =

Vice-Admiral Thomas Davers
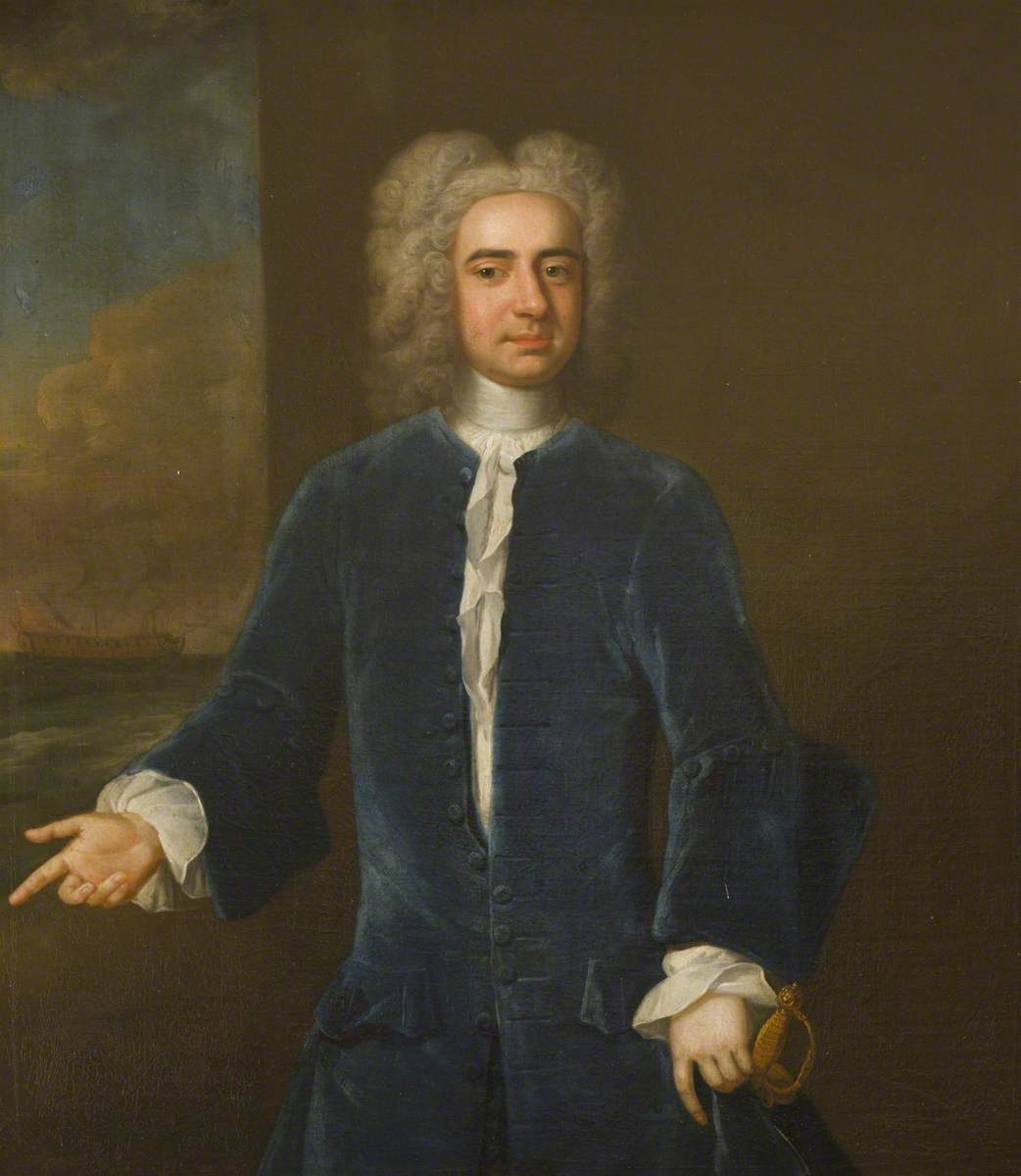
- Thomas Davers by Enoch Seeman
- Born: 1689
- Died: 16 September 1746 (aged 56–57)
- Military career
- Allegiance: Kingdom of Great Britain
- Branch: Royal Navy
- Rank: Vice admiral
- Commands: HMS Seaford; HMS Solebay; HMS Adventure; HMS Dolphin; HMS Grafton; HMS Deptford; HMS Stirling Castle; HMS Duke; Jamaica Station

Vice-Admiral Thomas Davers (1689 – 16 September 1746) was a Royal Navy officer who served as Commander-in-Chief of the Jamaica Station.

== Naval career ==
Born the third son of Sir Robert Davers, 2nd Baronet, Davers was promoted to post captain in January 1713 on appointment to the command of the sixth-rate HMS Seaford. He transferred to the command of the sixth-rate HMS Solebay in August 1718, of the fifth-rate HMS Adventure in 1719 and of the fifth-rate HMS Dolphin in 1728. He went on to take the command of the third-rate HMS Grafton in March 1734, of the fourth-rate HMS Deptford in October 1734 and of the third-rate HMS Grafton again in October 1739. After that he took the command of the third-rate HMS Stirling Castle in May 1742 and of the second-rate HMS Duke in July 1743.

Davers served as Commander-in-Chief of the Jamaica Station, with his flag in the third-rate HMS Cornwall, from 1744 until he died of yellow fever in Jamaica on 16 September 1746. He married Catherine Smithson with whom he lived at Horringer Hall at Horringer in Suffolk.

== Sources ==
- Cundall, Frank (1915). Historic Jamaica. West India Committee.

Military offices
Preceded by Sir Chaloner Ogle	Commander-in-Chief, Jamaica Station; 1744–1746	Succeeded by Cornelius Mitchell
