= HMS Berwick (1723) =

Ship of the line of the Royal Navy

- Berwick

History

Great Britain
- Name: HMS Berwick
- Ordered: 31 March 1721
- Builder: Deptford Dockyard
- Launched: 23 July 1723
- Fate: Broken up, 1763

General characteristics
- Class & type: 1719 Establishment 70-gun third rate ship of the line
- Tons burthen: 1147
- Length: 151 ft (46 m) (gundeck)
- Beam: 41 ft 6 in (12.65 m)
- Depth of hold: 17 ft 4 in (5.28 m)
- Propulsion: Sails
- Sail plan: Full-rigged ship
- Armament: 70 guns: Gundeck: 26 × 24-pounders; Upper gundeck: 26 × 12-pounders; Quarterdeck: 14 × 6-pounders; Forecastle: 4 × 6-pounders

HMS Berwick was a 70-gun third rate ship of the line of the Royal Navy, built by Richard Stacey at Deptford Dockyard and launched on 23 July 1723.

She was part of the Blockade of Porto Bello in 1727.

In 1739/40 she was under command of Captain Isaac Townsend.

Berwick was converted to a hulk in 1743, and eventually broken up in 1763.
