= HMS Duke (1682) =

Ship of the line of the Royal Navy

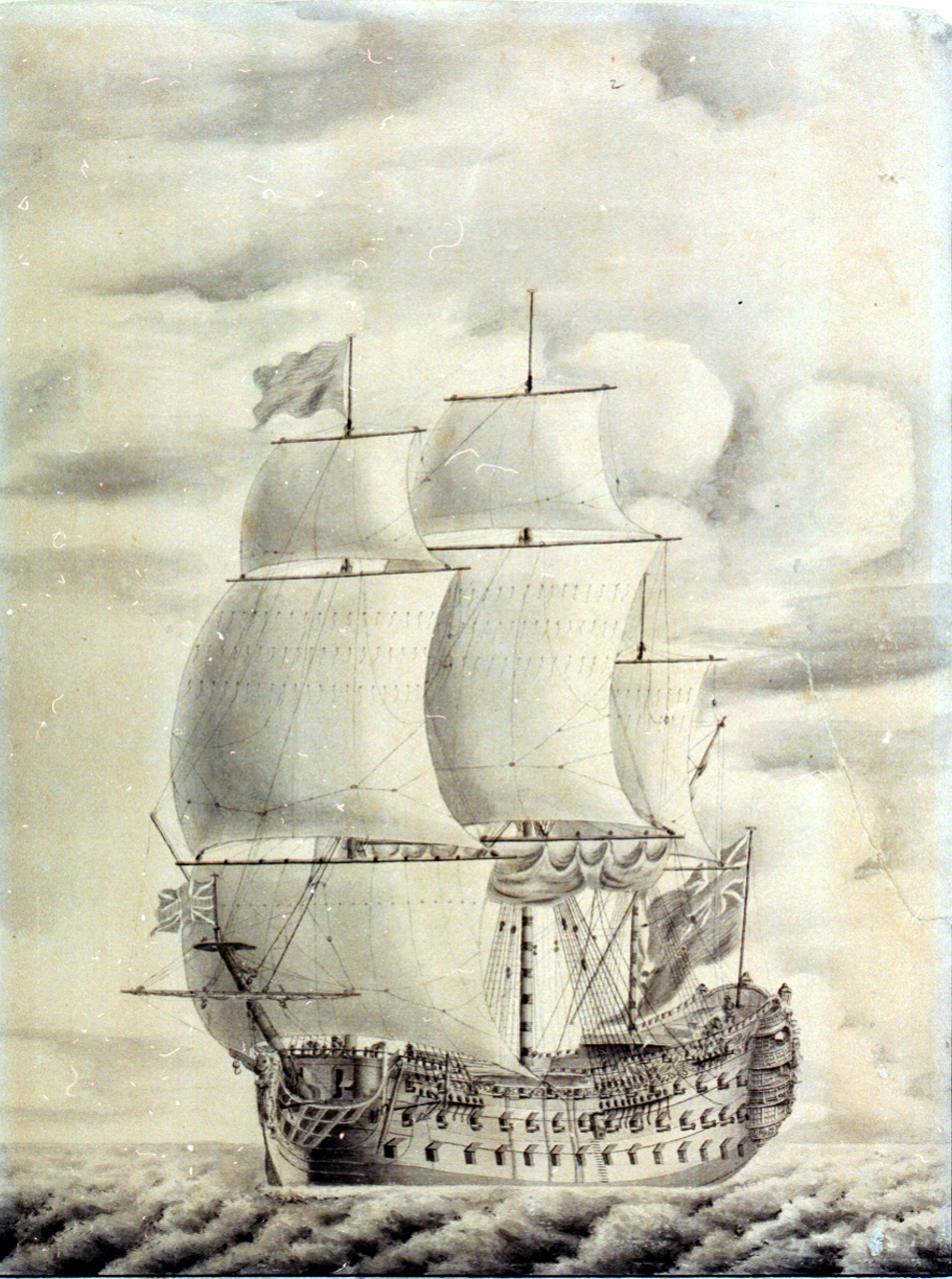
- Prince George 90 guns, sketched by John Hood in 1701

History

Great Britain
- Name: HMS Duke
- Builder: Thomas Shish, Woolwich Dockyard
- Launched: 13 June 1682
- Renamed: HMS Prince George, 1701
- Fate: Accidentally burned at sea on 13 April 1758
- Notes: Participated in: Battle of Málaga

General characteristics as built
- Class & type: 90-gun second rate ship of the line
- Tons burthen: 13641/94 (bm)
- Length: 162 ft 10 in (49.6 m) (gundeck)
- Beam: 45 ft 2 in (13.8 m)
- Depth of hold: 18 ft 9 in (5.7 m)
- Propulsion: Sails
- Sail plan: Full-rigged ship
- Armament: 90 guns of various weights of shot

General characteristics after 1701 rebuild
- Class & type: 90-gun second rate ship of the line
- Tons burthen: 142161/94 (bm)
- Length: 162 ft 10 in (49.6 m) (gundeck)
- Beam: 45 ft (13.7 m)
- Depth of hold: 18 ft 7 in (5.7 m)
- Propulsion: Sails
- Sail plan: Full-rigged ship
- Armament: 90 guns of various weights of shot

General characteristics after 1723 rebuild
- Class & type: 1719 Establishment 90-gun second-rate ship of the line
- Tons burthen: 158616/94 (bm)
- Length: 164 ft (50.0 m) (gundeck)
- Beam: 47 ft 2 in (14.4 m)
- Depth of hold: 18 ft 10 in (5.7 m)
- Propulsion: Sails
- Sail plan: Full-rigged ship
- Armament: 90 guns: Gundeck: 26 × 32-pdrs; Middle gundeck: 26 × 18-pdrs; Upper gundeck: 26 × 9-pdrs; Quarterdeck: 10 × 6-pdrs; Forecastle: 2 × 6-pdrs

HMS Duke was a 90-gun second-rate ship of the line of the Royal Navy, launched on 13 June 1682 at Woolwich Dockyard.

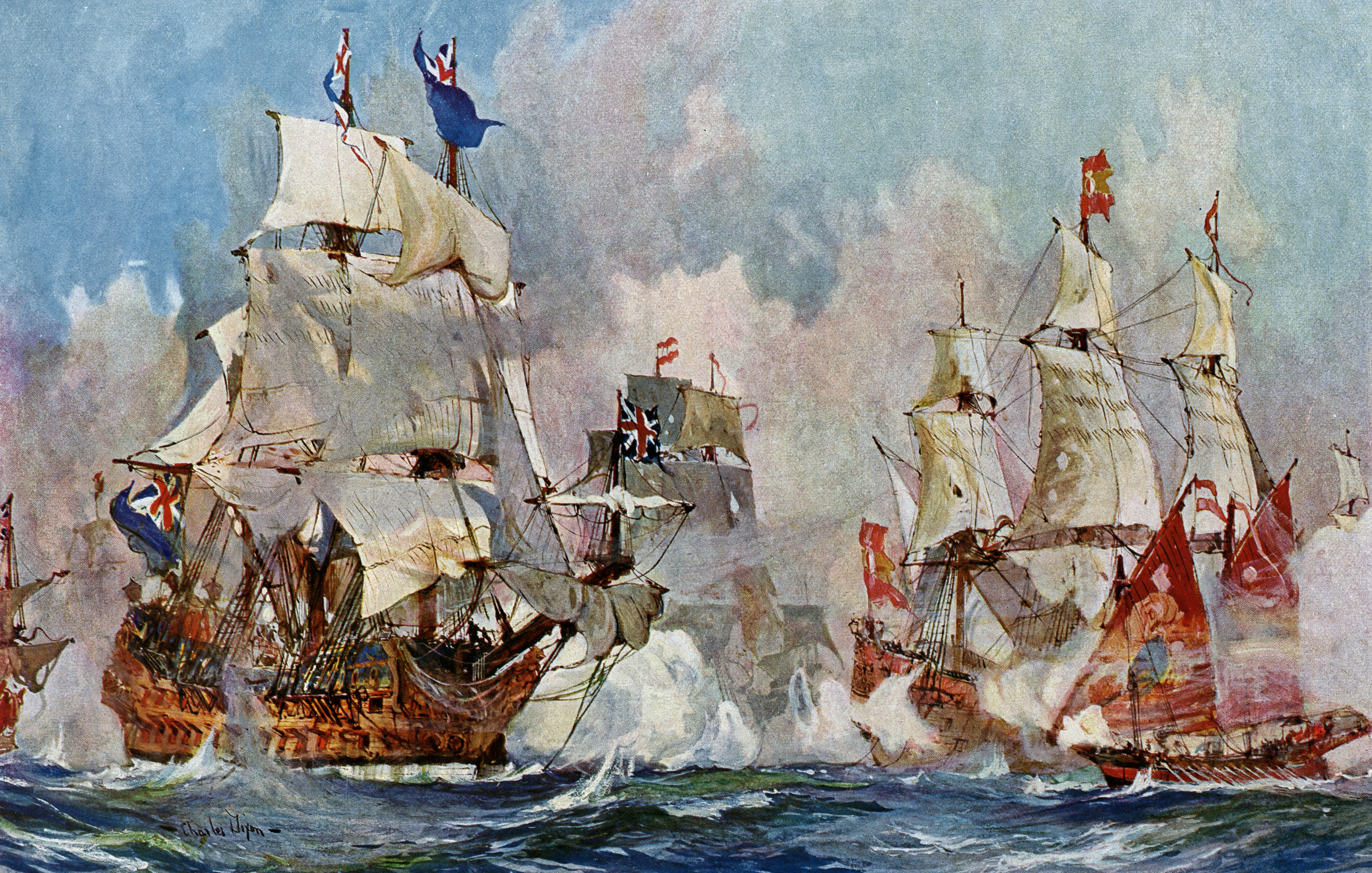
HMS Prince George during the Battle of Malaga, by Charles Dixon

She underwent a rebuild in 1701 as another 90-gun second rate, and was renamed HMS Prince George (after the future George II). After her rebuild, she served in the War of the Spanish Succession, fighting in the Battle of Málaga and the capture of Gibraltar.

On 4 November 1719 Prince George was ordered to be taken to pieces and rebuilt at Deptford by Richard Stacey, and she was relaunched on 4 September 1723 as a 90-gun second-rate built to the 1719 Establishment.

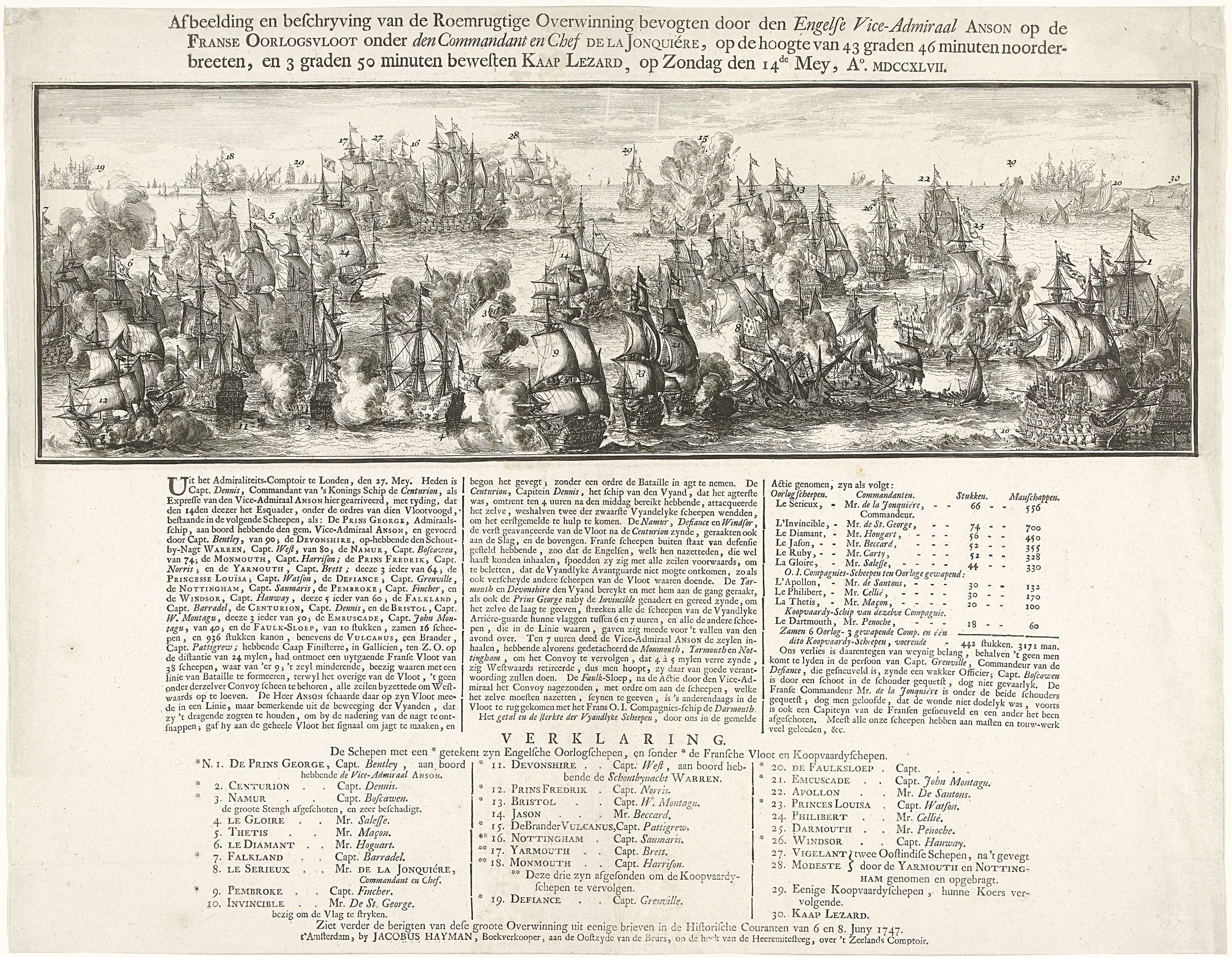
Prince George shown here at Cape Finisterre (1747)

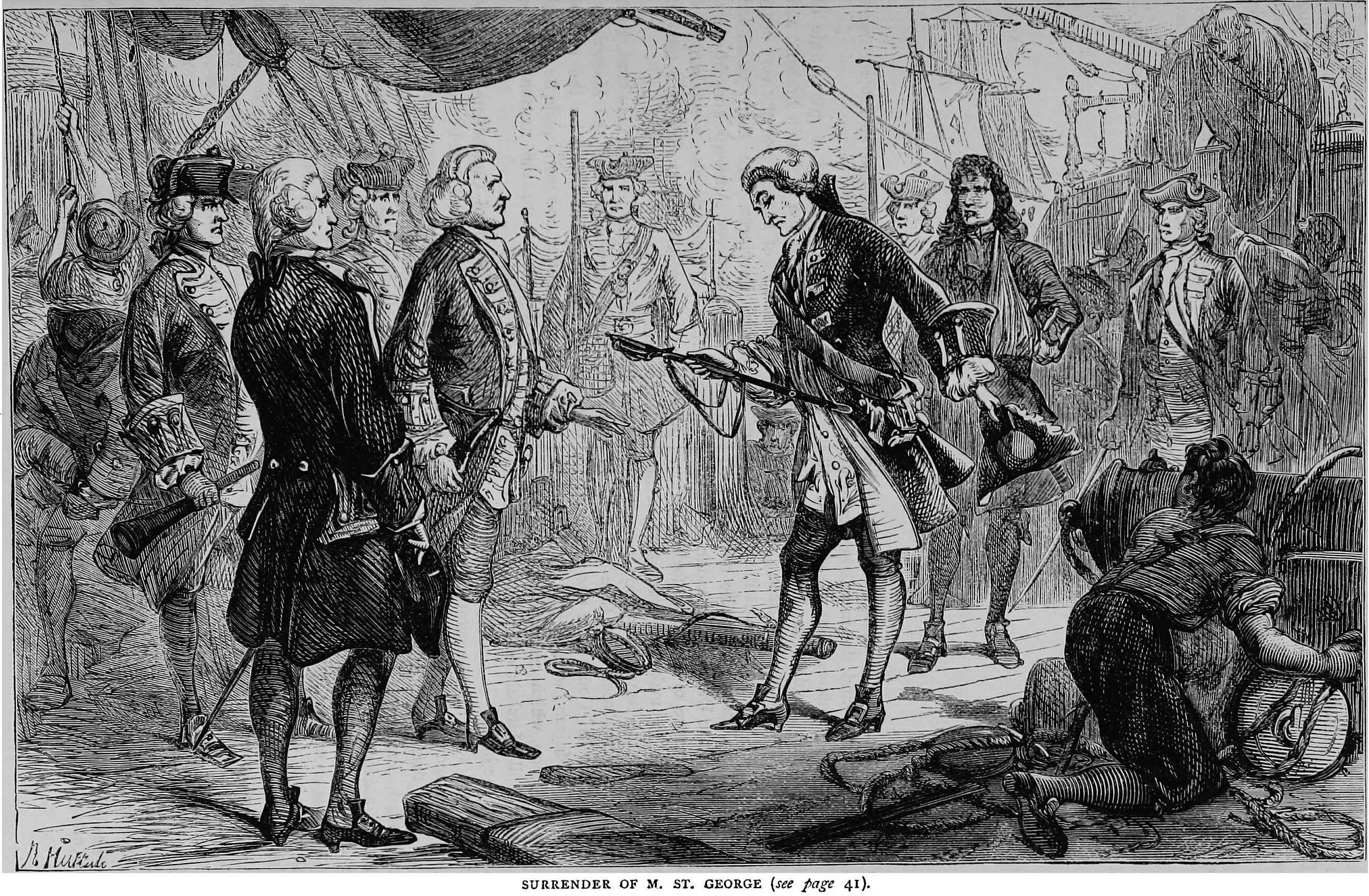
The Chevalier de St. George, surrenders his sword to Anson on board the Prince George, after the First Battle of Cape Finisterre (1747). He remarked, to Anson, in allusion to two of his now captured ships being named La Gloire and L' Invincible: "Monsieur, vous avec vaincu L' Invincible, et La Gloire vous suit" (Sir, you have defeated the invincible, and the glory follows you).

In June 1757 Prince George was taken into Portsmouth Dockyard for repairs. The work took four months to complete at a total cost of £9,513, after which the ship was recommissioned as the flagship of Rear Admiral Broderick. On 13 April 1758, Prince George was at sea in the Bay of Biscay when a fire broke out below decks. The flames quickly spread throughout the ship and she foundered with the loss of 485 out of 745 crew.
