= HMS Royal Anne =

Two ships of the Royal Navy have borne the name HMS Royal Anne. A third was renamed before being launched:

- HMS Royal Anne was a 100-gun first rate launched in 1670 as HMS St Andrew. She was rebuilt and renamed HMS Royal Anne in 1703 and was broken up in 1727.
- HMS Royal Anne was a 100-gun first rate launched in 1673 as HMS Royal Charles. She was renamed HMS Queen in 1693, HMS Royal George in 1715 and HMS Royal Anne in 1756. She was broken up in 1767.
- HMS Royal Anne (1709) 42 gun galley built at Woolwich Dockyard by Richard Stacey
- HMS Royal Anne was to have been a 100-gun first rate. She was renamed HMS Royal George before her launch in 1756. She foundered in 1782.

== See also ==
- HMS Royal Anne Galley was a 42-gun fifth rate launched in 1709 and wrecked in 1721.
