= Richard Short (military artist) =

English artist

- Occupations: naval officer, artist
- Known for: sketching's of Maritime subjects and Canada during the Seven Years' War

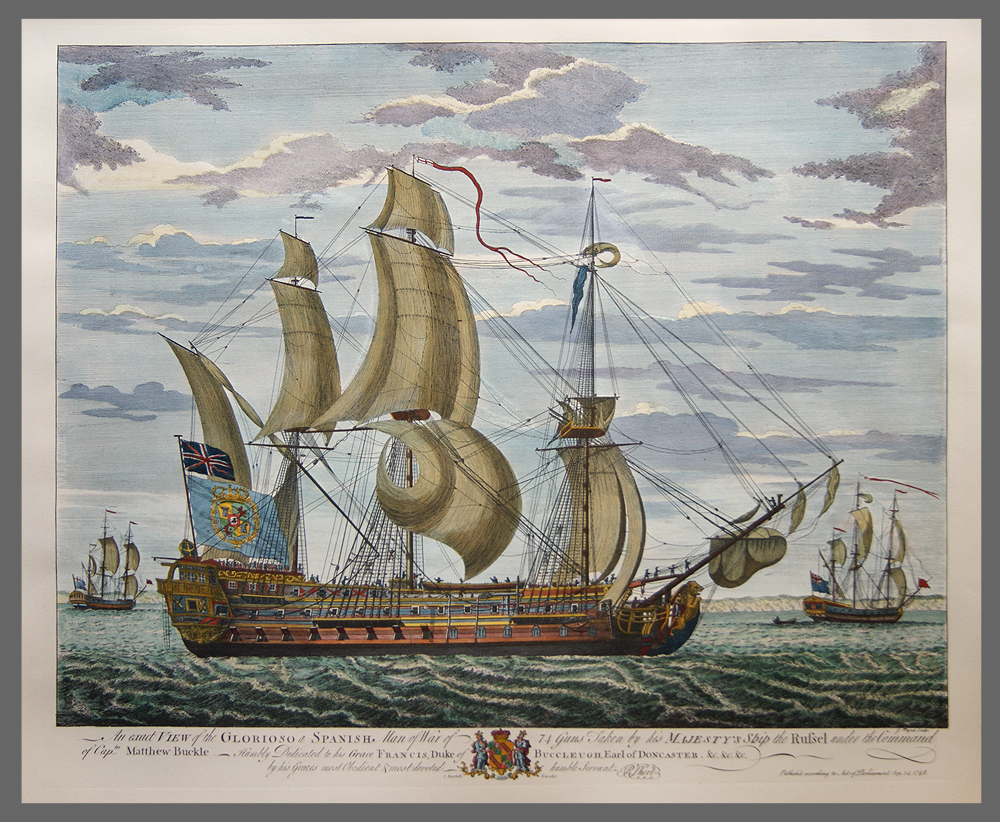
Exact view of 'Glorioso', a Spanish Man of War taken by HMS 'Russel' 9 October 1747, 1748

Richard Short (fl. bef. 1750, aft. 1766) was an English artist best known for sketches he made of Quebec City shortly after its capture by British forces. The appearance of many of the old French régime's principal buildings are known only from Short's sketches. He is also known for his sketches of Halifax, Nova Scotia, and notable naval engagements of the times.

== Life ==
The Dictionary of Canadian Biography describes Short as a military officer, noting that in the days before photography officers were encouraged to learn how to paint or draw images for military purposes. But it also notes that he was merely a ship's purser, in Quebec. Short served aboard British Royal Naval ships HMS Baltimore built 1742, Peregrine built 1749, Mermaid which sailed without him to Nova Scotia in 1754, Gibraltar built 1754, Leopard, the Prince of Orange which brought him to Quebec in 1759, Dublin which returned from the West Indies in 1763 and Neptune, before accepting an appointment at the Royal Navy's Chatham Dockyard.

Short served on HMS Prince of Orange from 1759 to 1761, and he was directed to make drawings, to record the appearance of principal Quebec buildings, following its capture. Also in 1759, while his ship was moored in Halifax, he sketched the then only ten-year-old town. The six views he drew were among the earliest images of Halifax ever produced. Parliament passed an act directing the publishing of his drawings. Two sets of Canadian prints were published, Twelve Views of the Principal Buildings in Quebec (1761), and Six views of the town and harbour of Halifax in Nova Scotia (1777). Painter Dominic Serres was commissioned by Short to create paintings based on the Halifax views; those remain in the collection of the Art Gallery of Nova Scotia.

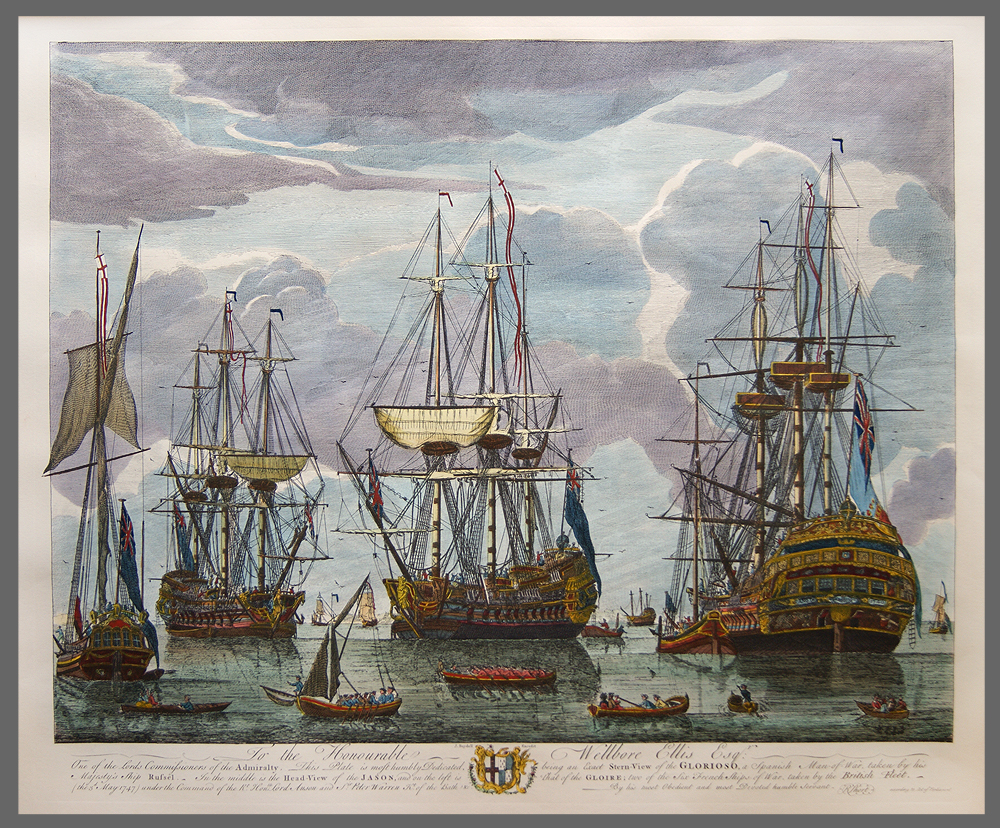
Exact Stern View of the 'Glorioso', a Spanish Man of War, taken by HMS 'Russel', In the middle the 'Jason', on the left the Gloire, two of the six French ships taken May 1747, 1755

On February 2, 2017, the Montreal Gazette published an article about one of Short's drawings of Quebec, as part of its coverage of Black History Month. The image showed a number of distant figures, including a black boy, in fancy clothes, attending a pair of affluent civilians, inspecting damage to a church. The article claims, Short captured “...the first image of a black person in Quebec, maybe even in Canadian history,” most likely a slave.

Some sources describe Short as part of the British garrison, as a Major, or Naval Captain.
