= HMS Hector (1703) =

Frigate of the Royal Navy

History

Great Britain
- Name: HMS Hector
- Ordered: 4 July 1702
- Builder: John and Richard Burchett, Rotherhithe, London
- Launched: 20 February 1703
- Decommissioned: September 1714
- Fate: BU 1718 to Rebuild

General characteristics
- Class & type: 42-gun Fifth rate two-decker frigate
- Tons burthen: 49374/94 bm tons
- Length: 116 ft 4.5 in (35.5 m) (on the gundeck), 95 ft 7 in (29.1 m) (keel)
- Beam: 31 ft 2 in (9.5 m)
- Depth of hold: 12 ft 11 in (3.9 m)
- Propulsion: Sails
- Sail plan: Full-rigged ship
- Armament: 42 guns of various weights of shot: 18 x 9-pounder guns (lower deck); 20 x 6-pounder guns (upper deck); 4 x 6-pounder guns (quarterdeck)

HMS Hector was a 42-gun fourth rate frigate of the Royal Navy, built at Rotherhithe and launched on 20 February 1703. As built, she measured 116 ft 4.5 in gundeck length, 95 ft 7 in keel length, 31 ft 2 in breadth and 12 ft 11 in depth in hold (giving a burthen tonnage of 49374/94 bm). She had two complete gun decks, and was armed with 18 x 9-pounder guns on the lower deck, 20 x 6-pounder guns on the upper deck, and 4 more 6-pounder guns on the quarterdeck.

She was one of seven 42-gun Fifth Rate ships built from 1702 to 1706 to specified dimensions of 115 ft gundeck length, 95 ft keel length, 31 ft 3in breadth and 13 ft depth in hold (giving a burthen tonnage of 49345/94 bm). The Hector was one of three of these for which contracts were signed on 4 July 1702 (the others were the Greyhound and Lark (often spelt Larke), the latter also built in the Greenland Dock in Rotherhithe, albeit by a different contractor); the remaining four ships (Garland, Folkestone, Roebuck and Sorlings) to this specification were all built in the Royal Dockyards.

The Hector was commissioned on 12 March 1703 under Captain Jordan Sandys, for service in the Channel. Under his command, she took part in an attack on enemy shipping off Mont St Michel on 26/27 July 1703, during which she destroyed two French naval sloops (the Joyeuse and the Railleuse). She was later commanded by Captain William Grey (1707–1709), Captain William Clarke (1709–1710) and then Captain William Ellford (1710–1714). In February 1712 she captured an 18-gun Bordeaux privateer. She was paid off into 'Ordinary' (reserve) in September 1714, and was docked on 24 March 1718 at Plymouth to be taken to pieces for rebuilding.
