= HMS Woolwich (1675) =

Ship of the line of the Royal Navy

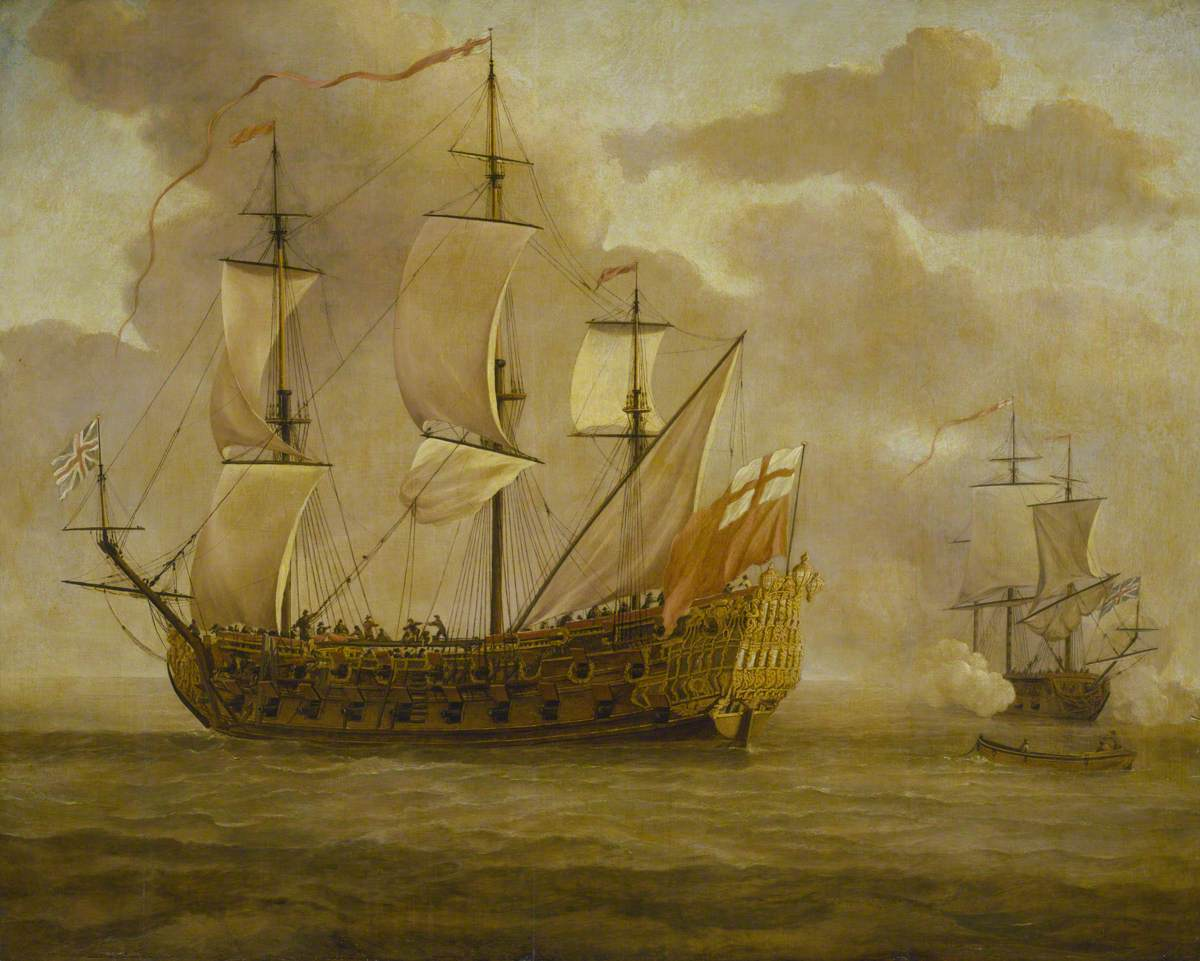
- HMS Woolwich, c.1677 (oil painting by Willem van de Velde, the Elder).

History

Great Britain
- Name: HMS Woolwich
- Builder: Phineas Pett III, Woolwich Dockyard
- Launched: 1675

General characteristics as built
- Class & type: 54-gun fourth rate ship of the line
- Tons burthen: 761 tons
- Length: 112 ft (34 m) (keel)
- Beam: 35 ft 9 in (10.90 m)
- Depth of hold: 15 ft (4.6 m)
- Propulsion: Sails
- Sail plan: Full-rigged ship
- Armament: 54 guns of various weights of shot

General characteristics after 1702 rebuild
- Propulsion: Sails
- Sail plan: Full-rigged ship

General characteristics after 1741 rebuild
- Class & type: 1733 proposals 50-gun fourth rate ship of the line
- Tons burthen: 866 tons
- Length: 134 ft (41 m) (gundeck)
- Beam: 38 ft 6 in (11.73 m)
- Depth of hold: 15 ft 9 in (4.80 m)
- Propulsion: Sails
- Sail plan: Full-rigged ship
- Armament: 50 guns: Gundeck: 22 × 18 pdrs; Upper gundeck: 22 × 9 pdrs; Quarterdeck: 4 × 6 pdrs; Forecastle: 2 × 6 pdrs

HMS Woolwich was a 54-gun fourth rate ship of the line of the Royal Navy, built by Phineas Pett III at Woolwich Dockyard and launched in 1675. She underwent a rebuild in 1702.

In 1705, when Thomas Ekines was in command, she was involved in the seizure of a Dutch ship which Ekines claimed was trading with Britains enemies of the War of the Spanish Succession. Although Ekines right to seize the ship was upheld, his further seizure of the bulk of the cargo for his personal gain caused major problems for his ongoing naval career.

On 10 June 1736 she was ordered to be stripped at Deptford Dockyard, and rebuilt by Richard Stacey to the lines of a 50-gun fourth rate according to the 1733 proposals of the 1719 Establishment. She was relaunched on 6 April 1741.

Woolwich was broken up at Chatham Dockyard in 1747.
