= HMS Buckingham (1731) =

Ship of the line of the Royal Navy

History

Great Britain
- Name: HMS Buckingham
- Ordered: 22 March 1727
- Builder: Deptford Dockyard
- Launched: 13 April 1731
- Fate: Broken up, 1745

General characteristics
- Class & type: 1719 Establishment 70-gun third rate ship of the line
- Tons burthen: 1128
- Length: 151 ft (46 m) (gundeck)
- Beam: 41 ft 6 in (12.65 m)
- Depth of hold: 17 ft 4 in (5.28 m)
- Propulsion: Sails
- Sail plan: Full-rigged ship
- Armament: 70 guns: Gundeck: 26 × 24-pdrs; Upper gundeck: 26 × 12-pdrs; Quarterdeck: 14 × 6-pdrs; Forecastle: 4 × 6-pdrs

HMS Buckingham was a 70-gun third rate ship of the line of the Royal Navy, built by Richard Stacey at Deptford Dockyard to the 1719 Establishment, and launched on 13 April 1731.

In 1740 she was under command of Captain Cornelius Mitchell.

She took part in the Battle of Toulon (1744).

Buckingham served until 1745 when she was broken up.
