= Thomas Ekines =

English naval officer

Thomas Ekines was an English projector and captain in the Royal Navy who combined the two roles by submitting proposals to the British government for military action in the Americas.

Ekines first project was proposed to William of Orange on 16 January during England's Glorious Revolution in which William became the King of England and drew England into the Nine Years' War against France. He proposed that he be assigned the temporary command of a Dutch ship with the goal of capturing the French ship St. John of Rochelle which was lying off the Isles of Scilly with a reputed value £20,000. In the end he proceeded to capture the French vessel but was obliged to release it whilst gaining no reward and leaving him in debt. Ekines then took charge of a frigate as part of the Post Office Packet Service new station at Falmouth, carrying mail to Corunna, Spain. However he was obliged to give up the post due to illness. Ekines went on to take command of HMS Woolwich and in this capacity seized a Dutch ship in Plymouth. He claimed the ship was trading with enemies of Queen Anne, Britain being involved in the War of the Spanish Succession. Whilst his right to seize the ship was upheld, his seizure for personal gain of much of the cargo was condemned and blocked his progression in the Navy.

In 1705 Ekines joined the Earl of Peterborough's expedition to Spain and served for nine months as an unpaid volunteer. Early on in the campaign he proposed that he lead an expedition of five ships and 1,000 soldiers across the Atlantic to seize Buenos Aires. However this project foundered after Peterborough took Barcelona. Then in 1707 he offered his services to the Board of Trade and Plantations to take command of a ship to attack pirates at Martinique and Guadeloupe. The response was that the Board did not appoint individual officers.

Ekines next project was an expedition to confront the Spanish in South America. Sidney Godolphin, Lord High Treasurer and Earl of Sunderland, Secretary of State for the Southern Department (whose responsibilities included the American colonies) expressed interest in this project, but wanted to have the project administered and financed by a consortium of merchants. Ekines rejected this, as he was concerned he would no longer be in charge of the expedition. In fact whilst there was the potential for plunder, as the war aims of the British was to secure the Spanish thrown for Archduke Charles, there was little prospect of long-term territorial gains for Britain.
