= HMS Prince of Orange =

Ship of the line of the Royal Navy

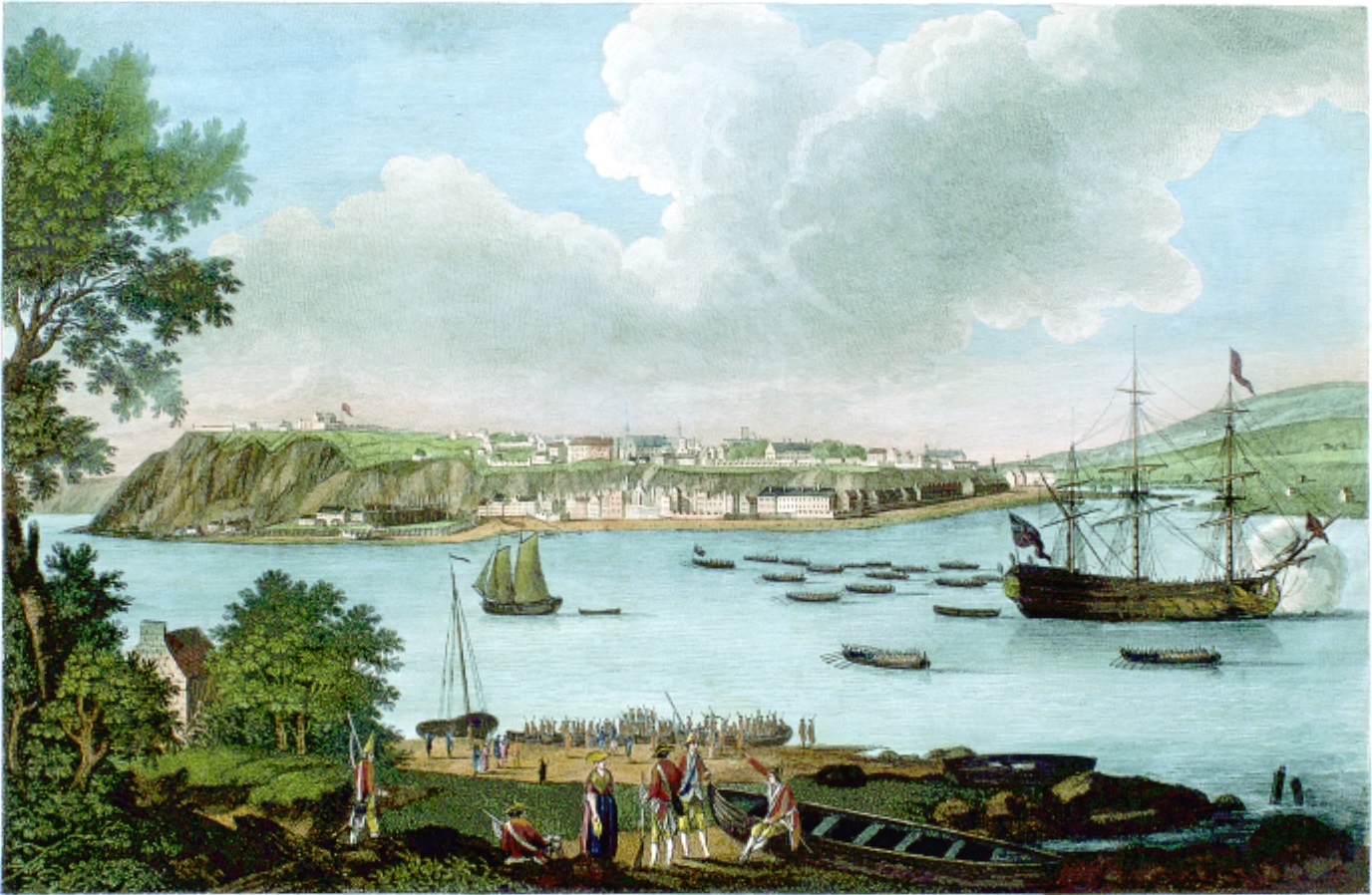
- A General View of Quebec, from Point Levy in 1759, by Richard Short

History

Great Britain
- Name: HMS Prince of Orange
- Ordered: 5 May 1729
- Builder: Deptford Dockyard
- Launched: 5 September 1734
- Fate: Sold, 1810

General characteristics
- Class & type: 1719 Establishment 70-gun third rate ship of the line
- Tons burthen: 1128
- Length: 151 ft (46 m) (gundeck)
- Beam: 41 ft 6 in (12.65 m)
- Depth of hold: 17 ft 4 in (5.28 m)
- Propulsion: Sails
- Sail plan: Full-rigged ship
- Armament: 70 guns: Gundeck: 26 × 24-pdrs; Upper gundeck: 26 × 12-pdrs; Quarterdeck: 14 × 6-pdrs; Forecastle: 4 × 6-pdrs

HMS Prince of Orange was a 70-gun third rate ship of the line of the Royal Navy, built by Richard Stacey to the 1719 Establishment at Deptford Dockyard, and launched on 5 September 1734.

In 1748, Prince of Orange was cut down to a 60-gun ship, a role in which it remained until being converted into a sheer hulk in 1772. The ship was part of the British Fleet at the capture of Louisbourg in 1758.

She brought Richard Short, the military artist to Quebec in 1759, where he drew pictures of the fleet, but did not name any vessel in particular. He served as purser on her from 1759 to 1761; within that period the ship was in Halifax, Nova Scotia, and Quebec City.

After nearly 40 years service as a hulk, she was finally sold out of the navy in 1810.

== Gallery of the fleet at anchor in Halifax, 1759, from sketches by Richard Short ==
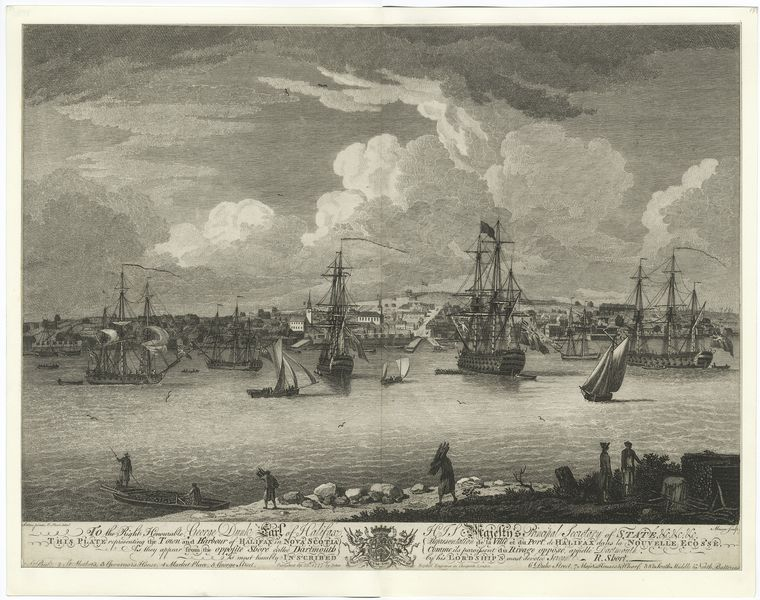
Halifax, viewed from Dartmouth

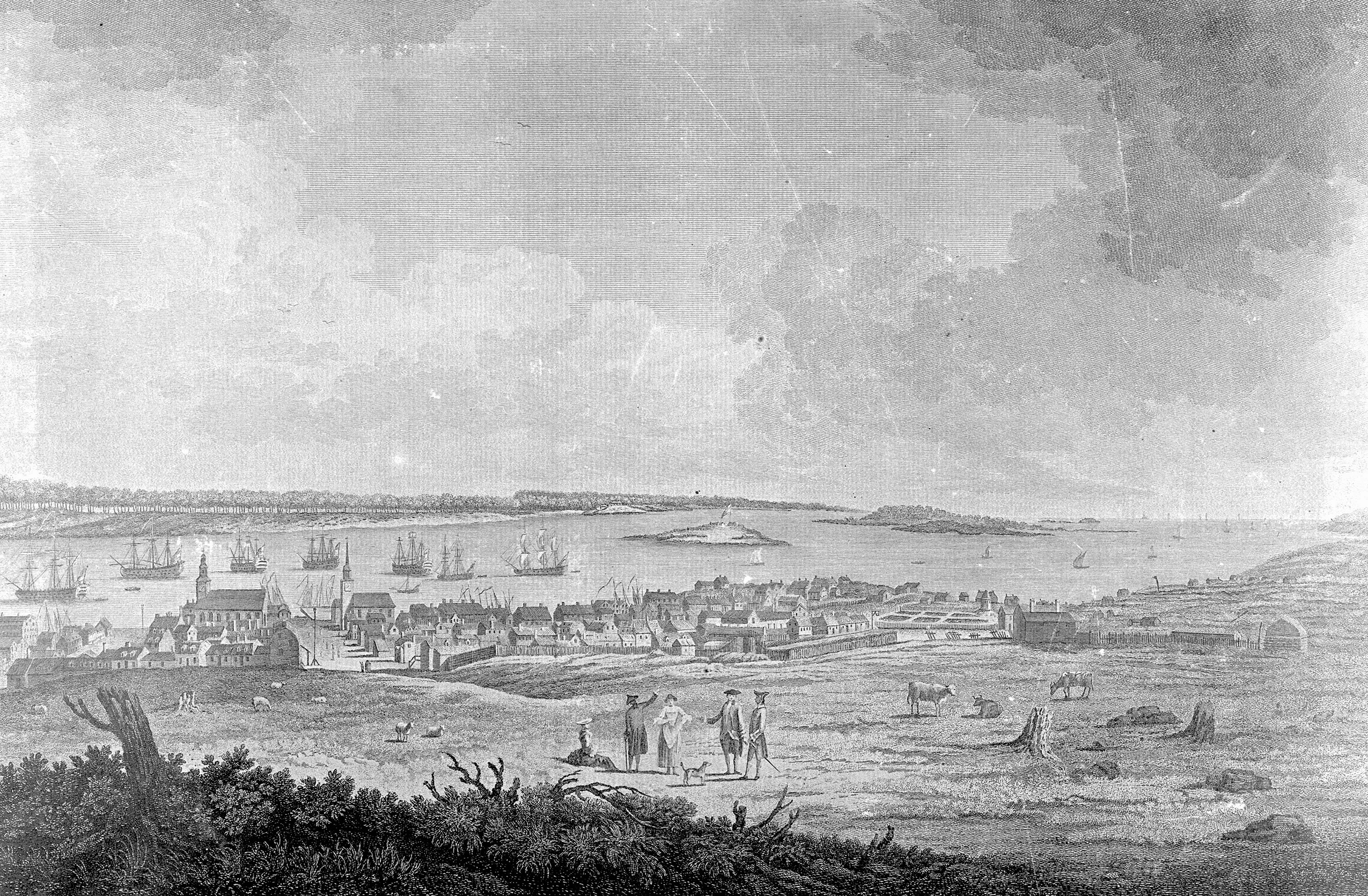
Looking down Prince Street

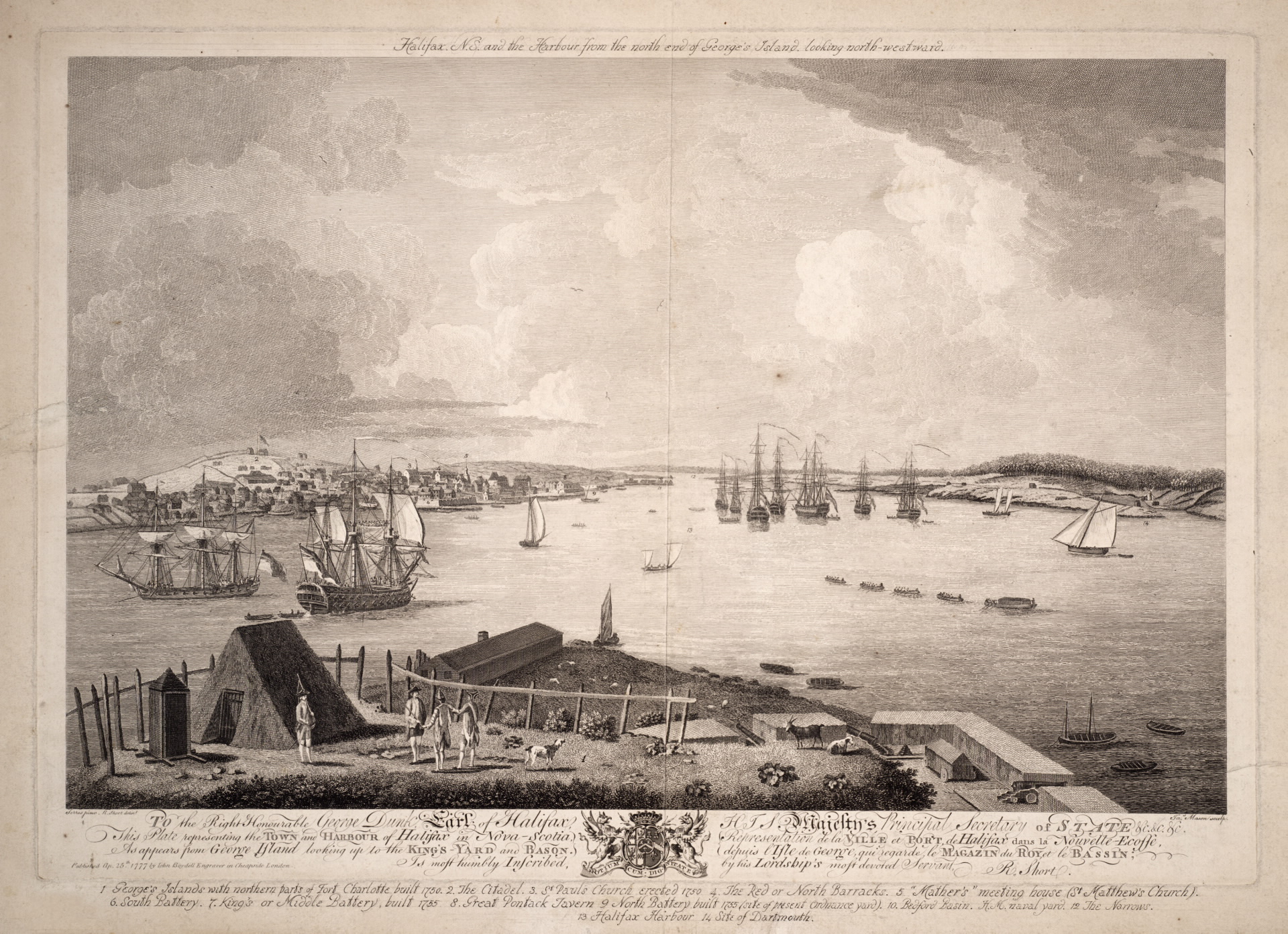
The Town and harbour as it appears from George's Island

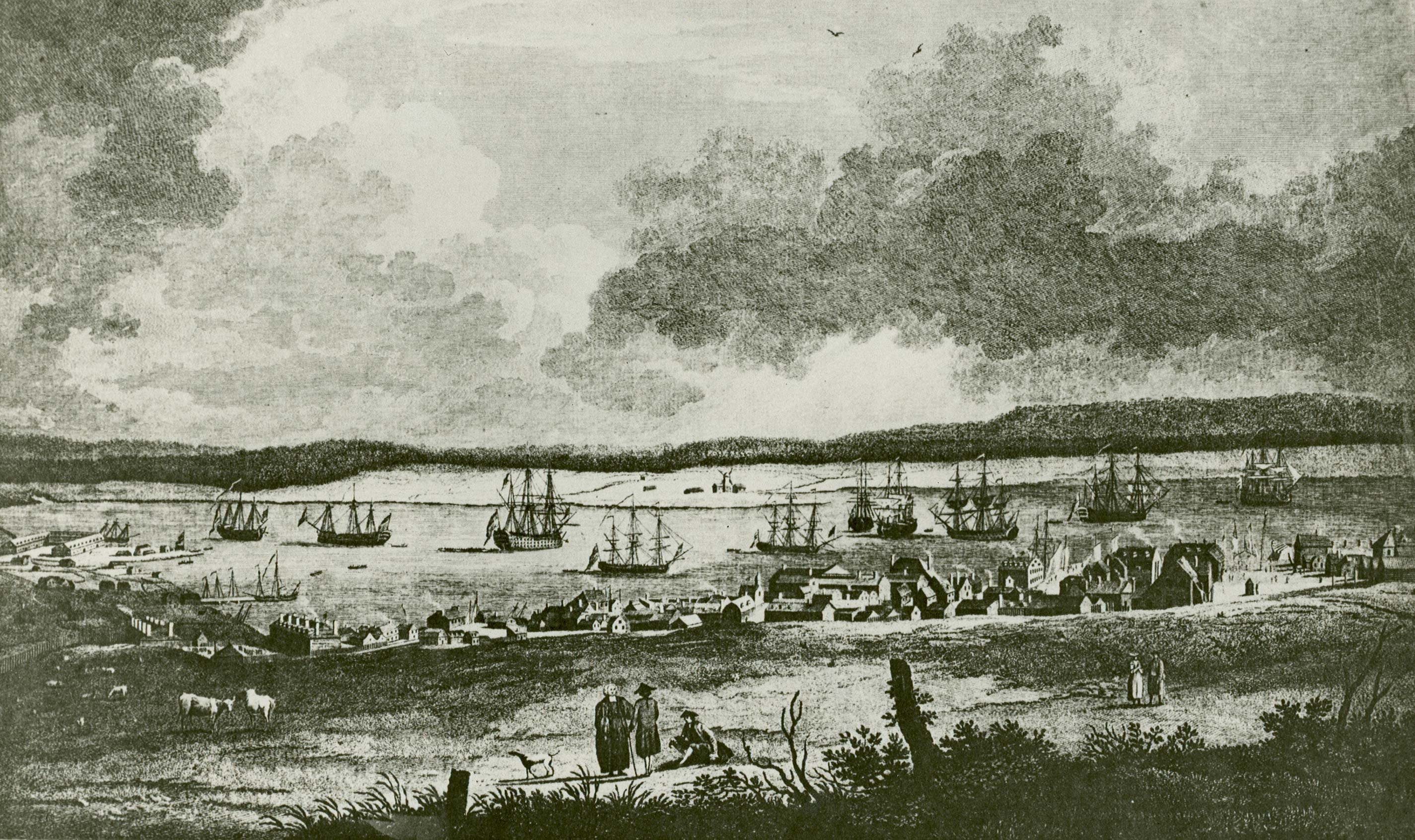
Looking down George Street
