= HMS Greyhound (1703) =

Frigate of the Royal Navy

History

Great Britain
- Name: HMS Greyhound
- Ordered: 4 July 1702
- Builder: William Hubbard, Ipswich
- Launched: 9 March 1703
- Fate: Wrecked off Tynemouth, 26 August 1711

General characteristics
- Class & type: 42-gun Fifth rate two-decker frigate
- Tons burthen: 49471/94 bm tons
- Length: 114 ft 3 in (34.8 m) (on the gundeck), 95 ft 3 in (29.0 m) (keel)
- Beam: 31 ft 3 in (9.5 m)
- Depth of hold: 12 ft 10.5 in (3.9 m)
- Propulsion: Sails
- Sail plan: Full-rigged ship
- Armament: 42 guns of various weights of shot: 18 x 9-pounder guns (lower deck); 20 x 6-pounder guns (upper deck); 4 x 6-pounder guns (quarterdeck)

HMS Greyhound was a 42-gun fourth rate frigate of the Royal Navy, built at Ipswich and launched on 9 March 1703. Her name is alternatively spelt Greyhond. As built, she measured 114 ft 3 in gundeck length, 95 ft 3 in keel length, 31 ft 3 in breadth and 12 ft 101/2 depth in hold (giving a burthen tonnage of 49471/94 bm). She had two complete gun decks, and was armed with 18 x 9-pounder guns on the lower deck, 20 x 6-pounder guns on the upper deck, and 4 more 6-pounder guns on the quarterdeck.

She was one of seven 42-gun Fifth Rate ships built from 1702 to 1706 to specified dimensions of 115 ft gundeck length, 95 ft keel length, 31 ft 3in breadth and 13 ft depth in hold (giving a burthen tonnage of 49345/94 bm). The Greyhound was one of three of these for which contracts were signed on 4 July 1702 (the others were the Hector and Lark (often spelt Larke), which were both built in different parts of the Greenland Dock in Rotherhithe, albeit by different contractors); the remaining four ships (Garland, Folkestone, Roebuck and Sorlings) to this specification were all built in the Royal Dockyards.

Greyhound was commissioned on 2 March 1703 under Captain Charles Layton, for convoys to Ireland. Layton died on 11 November 1704, and Captain James Heriot was given command three days later. Captain James Stuart took over command on 14 January 1709, for service on the coast of Scotland, and later in the North Sea; under his command, on 26 August 1711 she was wrecked on the bar at the mouth of the River Tyne.
