= HMS Solebay (1711) =

History

Great Britain
- Name: HMS Solebay
- Ordered: 29 July 1710
- Builder: Royal Dockyard, Portsmouth
- Launched: 21 August 1711
- Commissioned: 1712
- Reclassified: Bomb ketch June 1726; Fireship August 1734; 20-gun sixth rate June 1735; Hospital ship August 1742
- Fate: Sold 23 June 1748

General characteristics
- Type: 24-gun sixth rate
- Tons burthen: 272 30/94 bm
- Length: 95 ft 10 in (29.2 m) gundeck; 80 ft 0 in (24.4 m) keel for tonnage
- Beam: 25 ft 2 in (7.7 m) for tonnage
- Depth of hold: 10 ft 8 in (3.3 m)
- Armament: 20 × 6-pdr 19 cwt guns on wooden trucks (UD); 4 × 4-pdr 12 cwt guns on wooden trucks (QD)

HMS Solebay was a member of the Gibraltar Group of 24-gun sixth rates. After commissioning she spent her career in Home waters, North America, and the West Indies on trade protection duties. She was converted to a bomb ketch with 3 mortars and six guns in 1726. She became a fireship in 1734 then converted back to a 24-gun sixth rate in 1735. Her final conversion was into a hospital ship to lie at Tower Wharf in 1742. She was sold in 1748.

== Construction ==
Solebay was ordered on 29 July 1710 from Portsmouth Dockyard to be built under the guidance of Richard Stacey, Master Shipwright of Portsmouth. She was launched on 21 August 1711.

== Commissioned service ==
Solebay was commissioned in 1712 under the command of Commander William Owen (promoted to captain in January 1713) for service in the Irish Sea. She proceeded to Newfoundland for 1714 to 1715, then on to New York in 1715 to 1717. In 1718 she was under command of Captain Richard Davis for service to Sale, Morocco until his death on 2 August 1718 when Captain Thomas Davers took over. She underwent a great repair of her hull at Deptford at a cost of £2,949.7.51/2 (Note: A total cost accounting for inflation of approximately £527,000 in today's money.) from March to August 1720. In May 1721 Captain James Windham was in command in the North Sea. Captain Lord Muskerry was her commander for a convoy to Newfoundland. Through 1723 - 24 she was under the command of Captain Francis Knighton on Newfoundland convoy duty.

She underwent a survey on 6 March 1726 then converted to a bomb ketch and fitted to carry three mortars and six guns at a cost of £1,070.12.0d (Note: A total cost accounting for inflation of approximately £191,200 in today's money.) in June 1726. She was commissioned after conversion under Captain Thomas Durell for the coast of Spain. In 1729 Captain Peter Warren took her to Jamaica, Commander Israel Sparkes was in command for the Mediterranean. In 1729 Warren took her to New York then home to pay off in August 1732. She was fitted at Woolwich Dockyard for £1,334.12.3d (Note: A total cost accounting for inflation of approximately £238,300 in today's money.) in January/February 1733, then another fitting at Plymouth Dockyard between April and May 1733. When completed she commissioned under Captain Charles Fanshawe for service to Newfoundland in 1733.

Admiralty Order (AO) 8 March 1734 had her converted to an 8-gun fireship at Woolwich at a cost of £1,589.7.9d (Note: A total cost accounting for inflation of approximately £284,000 in today's money.) between February and August 1734. One year later between May and June 1735 she was converted back to a 20-gun sixth rate at a cost of £1,560.1.5d. (Note: A total cost accounting for inflation of approximately £278,700 in today's money.) In May 1735 she was under the command of Commander Thomas Cooper as the guardship at Portsmouth between 1736 and 1738. She was surveyed in 1738 and received a new foremast set. She was then commissioned under Commander Franklin Lushington for service in the Mediterranean. AO 30 June 1740 directed that she be converted to a Hospital ship. The conversion was executed between June and August 1742 at a cost of £640.5.7d. (Note: A total cost accounting for inflation of approximately £121,700 in today's money.) Upon completion she was tied alongside at Tower Wharf.

== Disposition ==
HMS Solebay was sold by AO 4 May 1748 for £113 (Note: A total cost accounting for inflation of approximately £21,400 in today's money.) on 26 June 1748.
