= HMS Lark (1703) =

Frigate of the Royal Navy

History

Great Britain
- Name: HMS Lark
- Ordered: 4 July 1702
- Builder: Richard Wells, Rotherhithe, London
- Launched: 6 March 1703
- Decommissioned: April 1716
- Fate: BU 1723 at Sheerness to Rebuild at Woolwich

General characteristics
- Class & type: 42-gun Fifth rate two-decker frigate
- Tons burthen: 4925/94 bm tons
- Length: 115 ft 2 in (35.1 m) (on the gundeck), 95 ft (29.0 m) (keel)
- Beam: 31 ft 2.5 in (9.5 m)
- Depth of hold: 12 ft 10 in (3.9 m)
- Propulsion: Sails
- Sail plan: Full-rigged ship
- Armament: 42 guns of various weights of shot: 18 x 9-pounder guns (lower deck); 20 x 6-pounder guns (upper deck); 4 x 6-pounder guns (quarterdeck)

HMS Lark was a 42-gun fourth rate frigate of the Royal Navy, built at Rotherhithe and launched on 6 March 1703. The name was often spelt Larke. As built, she measured 115 ft 2 in gundeck length, 95 ft keel length, 31 ft 21/2 in breadth and 12 ft 10 in depth in hold (giving a burthen tonnage of 4925/94 bm). She had two complete gun decks, and was armed with 18 x 9-pounder guns on the lower deck, 20 x 6-pounder guns on the upper deck, and 4 more 6-pounder guns on the quarterdeck.

She was one of seven 42-gun Fifth Rate ships built from 1702 to 1706 to specified dimensions of 115 ft gundeck length, 95 ft keel length, 31 ft 3in breadth and 13 ft depth in hold (giving a burthen tonnage of 49345/94 bm). The Hector was one of three of these for which contracts were signed on 4 July 1702 (the others were the Greyhound and Hector, the latter also built in the Greenland Dock in Rotherhithe, albeit by a different contractor); the remaining four ships (Garland, Folkestone, Roebuck and Sorlings) to this specification were all built in the Royal Dockyards.

The Lark was first commissioned in early 1703 under Captain Bennet Allen, but he was dismissed by a court martial on 5 August, having been replaced as commander of the Lark by Captain Jonas Hanway on 29 July. She was present at the Battle of Velez-Malaga on 13 August 1704, under the command of Captain Charles Fotherby. The ship was paid off into 'Ordinary' (reserve) in April 1716, and was taken to pieces at Sheerness Dockyard in 1723; her usable timbers were taken to Woolwich Dockyard for rebuilding.
