= History of Santa Cruz de Mompox =

Historic Centre of Santa Cruz de Mompox
UNESCO World Heritage Site
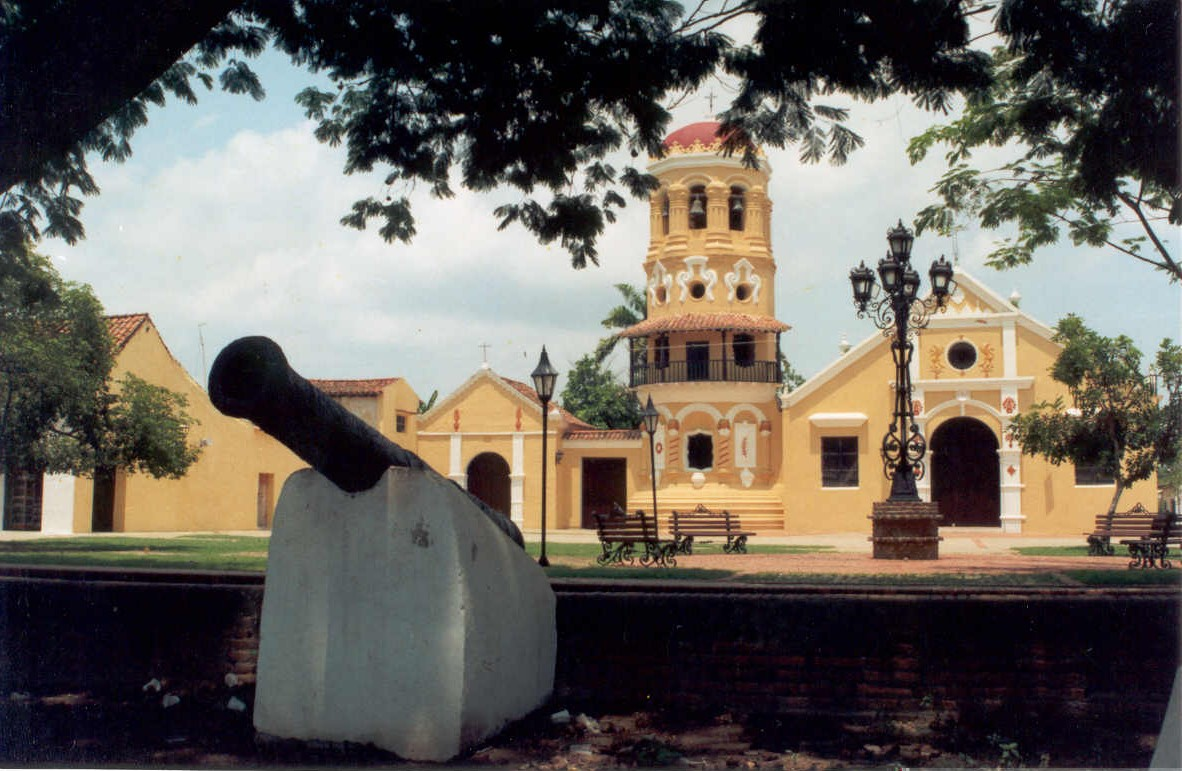
- Santa Barbara Church

- Location within Colombia
- Location: Santa Cruz de Mompox, Bolívar Department, Colombia
- Criteria: Cultural: (iv)(v)
- Reference: 742
- Inscription: 1995 (19th Session)
- Coordinates: 9°14′N 74°26′W

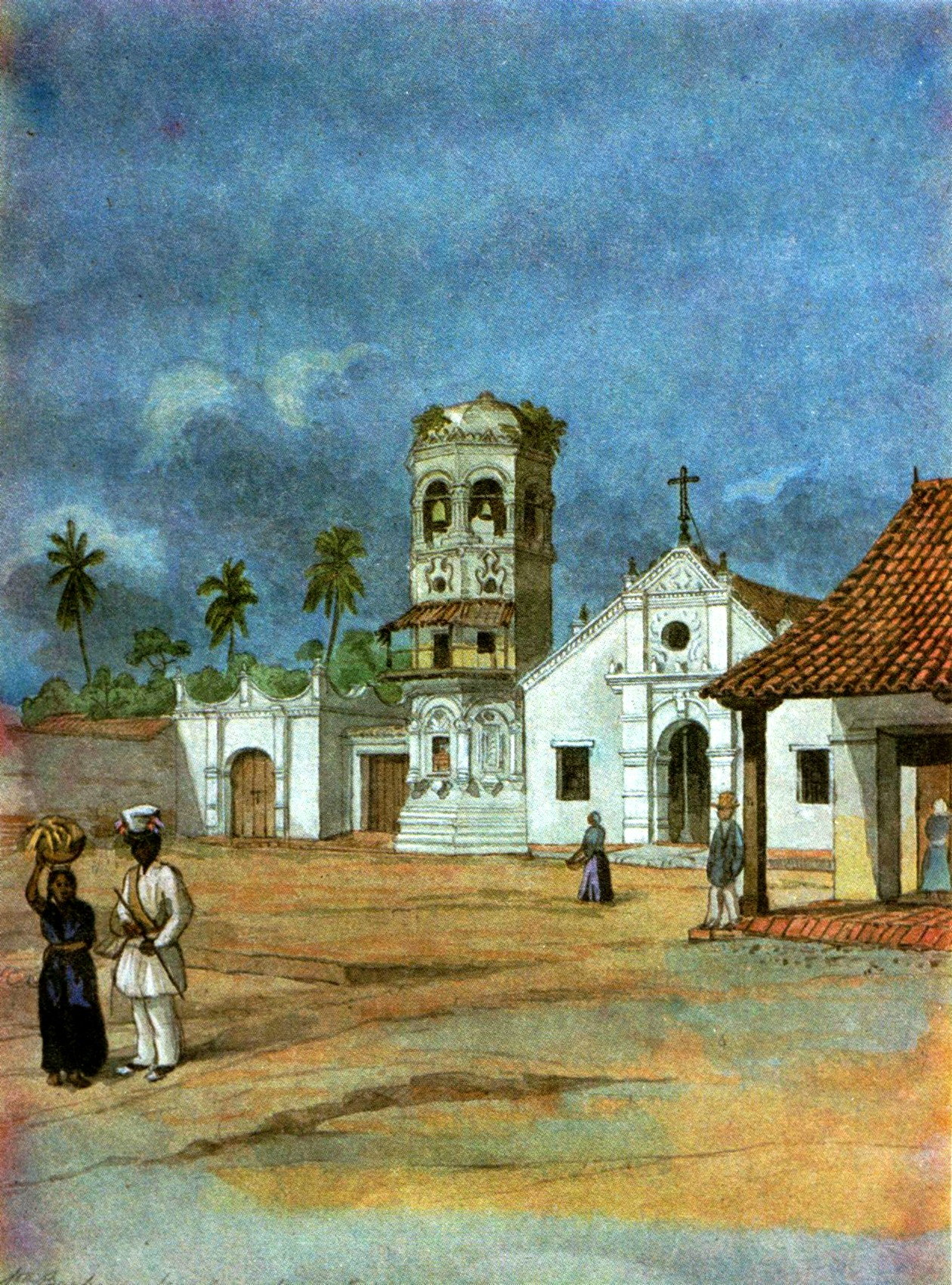
Church of Santa Bárbara in 1845, Watercolor by Edward Walhouse Mark.

The Villa de Santa Cruz de Mompox was founded by Don Juan Quintero de Heredia, Adelantado of the Gobernation of Cartagena and brother of the founder of that city, Pedro de Heredia, on May 3, 1537, after fighting battles against the Kimbay tribe and defeating the Chieftain Mompoj.

In the independence period, "Santa Cruz de" practically disappears and enters to denominate "Mompox" in the documents of the President Governor of the State of Cartagena de Indias dated November 3 of 1812. Since then, it has been called "Mompox" or "Mompos" in all official and notarial acts, both meanings being valid given the language evolution.

The name of Mompox comes from the great Cacique "Mompoj" (identification in Malibu language), whose tribe inhabited the area where today the city exists and came from the Malibu Indians civilization. By the time of the conquest, the Cacique already ruled about fifty small tribes, among them the Güitacas, Chilloas, Chimíes, Chicaguas, Jaguas, Malibues, Kates, Kimbayes, Menchiquejos, and Talahiguas. The tribes were formed by means of alliances, confederations subject to certain pacts, if not like vassals like allies and relatives who actaban the authority of the Cacique Mompoj.

Cacique Mompoj had as lieutenants the chiefs Zuzua and Mahamon who were the most important, although there were others such as Zimití, Zambe, Chilloa, and Omigale among others.

== The Colony ==
The foundation of the Convent of the Hermit Calced Fathers of St. Augustine in the 17th century means a new era of progress for this town, but also the arrival of the Inquisition. Mompóx is known as an inquisitorial center which issues condemnations for chiromancy, heresy, blasphemy, among others. The Jesuits founded the school of San Carlos, where young mompoxinos could study Latin grammar, philosophy and theology.

From very early in Colombian history, Mompóx stood out as a goldsmith's port. The workshops where gold is molded from nearby towns such as Loba and Guamocó are described by authors like Aníbal Noguera. The quality of its jewelry make of Mompóx a town with great influx of visitors throughout its history.

The commercial activity during the colony was active also thanks to the production of clay artifacts for domestic use (such as tinajones, moyos, pots, bottles, plates, etc.) and glazed earthenware ornaments (columns, herons, palm trees, toys, etc.). Likewise, it is a city that is soon known for the quality of its preserved sweets, jellies and fruits.

With its six churches (one of them adorned by a spectacular Baroque campanile donated by Don Martin de Setuain), its constant commercial activity and its privileged position on the map, Mompóx is one of the most flourishing cities of the New Kingdom of Granada. At its gates come people belonging to the creole nobility and illustrious personages of the world history of the time. Mompox was the target of pirates throughout the history of the Colony. Say that John Hawkins came to its port attracted by the reputation of port of riches and delights.

The Count of Santa Cruz de la Torre went up to Mompóx after being attacked by pirates in Rioacha and not having felt at home in Santa Marta or Cartagena de Indias. From there he manages his haciendas of Santa Cruz de Paparen in the savannas of Santo Toribío. Andrés de Madarriaga, a hero of the Cartagena resistance against the siege of Vernon and in defense of the river during that battle, chooses Mompox as an address after it acquires Pestagua County. Juan Bautista de Mier y de la Torre, the first Marquis of Santa coa, develops his fortune and has his base in Mompox, living in the house built by his father-in-law, Captain Pedro Gutiérrez, in what is known as the Portales de la Marquesa.

José Fernando de Mier y Guerra, married to his cousin sister and one of the two daughters of his uncle Juan Bautista de Mier y de la Torre (Juana Bartola), lives in Mompox, from where he launches his pacification campaign of the indigenous Chimilas tribes They inhabited what is today the department of Magdalena. He found more than twenty towns, such as El Banco, San Sebastián de Buenavista, Pijino, Cerro de San Antonio, Pedraza, Plato, Chimichagua, Chiriguana, etc. And from Mompox controls the properties of Calenturas (today La Loma de Calenturas is in the middle of the hacienda, as well as La Jagua de Ibirico), the lands of Loba that acquires by purchase in a public auction after having belonged by inheritance to Maria Nieto (of the mounts of Maria) and several haciendas and gold mines.

Julián de Trespalacios y Mier, second Marquess of Santa Coa, married with his cousin sister and one of the two daughters of his uncle Juan Bautista de Mier y de la Torre (Ignacia Andrea), lives in Mompox, from where he controlled the haciendas of Santa Bárbara de las Cabezas (today in Cesar), Cispataca (San Benito de Abad) as the gold mines of Cáceres and others.

Gonzalo José de Hoyos y Mier, the first Marquis de Torre Hoyos, married to a great-granddaughter of Juan Bautista de Mier y de la Torre, lives in the mansion of the Portales of the Marquess, a title inherited by his daughter María Josefa Isabel de Hoyos y Hoyos, who will face the war of independence, settling in Jamaica for more than ten years before returning and find his haciendas completely desolate.

In his passage through the city, Alexander von Humboldt is housed in a house on the Portales of the Marquise in La Albarrada, on the banks of the Magdalena River.

== First Independence ==
The province of Mompox caused it to be the first town of the New Kingdom of Granada that proclaimed absolute independence of Spain on August 6 of 1810. It is said that it was carried out under the motto "to be free or to die".

At that time, the royal authority was represented by the Commander in Arms, Vicente Talledo. The mayor was Don Pantaleón Germán de Ribón and the Sheriff Major Dr. Vicente Celedonio Guitérrez de Piñeres, both fervent conspirators of the independentist cause.

Between the royal authority and the Creoles they begin to record friction to the point that Talledo intercepts a communiqué of encouraging the rebellion between the Piñeres from Mompóx and those of Piñeres from Cartagena. The matter, said to have the rebels killed in the king's name, has no greater consequence for the rebels, as vicar Juan Fernandez de Sotomayor burns the evidence in the convent of San Agustín.

In those days the rumors of a general rebellion kept tense the relations between the royaL power and the sons of the colonies. On April 24, 1810, Don Pataleón Germán del Ribón and Ramón del Corral, father of the first's wife, assemble about 25 militiamen. These parade as guards of the traditional procession of Holy Week. The official troops, smaller in number, retreat to avoid confrontation.

The substitution of forces has more than a symbolic importance. It is the trigger of a series of facts that lead to Mompóx to be a vital enclave of the Gran Colombian independence. Commander Talledo begins to seek desperate ways to return to power. Commits authoritarian acts and without justifiable reason. He accuses of espionage in favor of Napoléon Bonaparte to one of the richest and dearest merchants of the town.

Talledo's abuse of power comes as far as Santa Fe. The capital and Cartagena claim, but the Viceroy gives Talledo his full support. The chapter of Cartagena commissioned Don Antonio de Narváez and Don Antonio de Villavicencio to settle the problem by apoliinting Talledo and bringing him to trial, capital of the jurisdiction.

Of course, the episode is not easily resolved. The slaves of the merchant's family accused of espionage besiege the Commander's house on Calle de la Sierpe street. The inhabitants of the towns of Zuzua and Mamón are added to the revolt against the Spanish power. Before surrendering, Talledo decided to flee to Santa Fe on July 2. It is, in fact, the first Newgranadine town to ignore (to the point of expelling it) the representative of the power of the Spanish Crown.

Eighteen days later, the Official Cry of Outbreak would explode in Cartagena de Indias. The celebration of this event in Mompox is narrated in the following way by Dr. José María Salazar, eyewitness of the fiesta:

"Some of them jumped, some shouted, and all looked anxiously among the crowd, to their tenderest friends, to salute them with the ardor of liberty. The noise of the bells, the gunpowder, the music, and a thousand cheers and enthusiastic cheers raised the spirit and caused a kind of singular alienation "(Noguera, 528).

On August 6 of that same year, the first open town hall of the city was convened. The Capitulants José María Gutiérrez and José María Salazar are dressed in gala dresses and wear a ribbon: God and Independence. They will proclaim the Absolute Independence of Spain. A copy of the Minutes will be sent to the Governing Board of Cartagena. Soon the order will be imposed to give freedom to the slaves, to promote the destruction of the elements of torture of the Inquisition.

The Act never goes up to the Governing Board. Cartagena fears the failure of the independence revolution and declares war on Mompox. The first civil strife. With this confusion culminates the first episode of the Momposina Independence.

== The Second War of Independence ==
Mompox was one of the first towns of the New Kingdom of Granada that proclaimed the absolute independence from Spain on 6 August 1811, under the motto "to be free or to die." After the disaster of the Battle of Puerto Cabello, the Liberator, with 400 Momposinos and the reinforcement of Venezuelans, undertook the "Campaña Admirable" which culminated in Caracas on August 6, 1813. Support of the momposinos is fundamental for Bolívar to exclaim "If Caracas I owe the life to Mompox I owe the glory".

Mompox, the Valerous City, also called Ciudad Culta, for its illustrious children, continues to look forward to the historic day in which the Gran Colombian nation, in gratitude, contributes with great works for its feat and contribution to the heritage of Colombian history.

At that time Mompos was a very rich city that had in its power to some Spanish soldiers, the Arm of Mompós was the most important channel of the Magdalena River and the city became important port of call for travelers and merchandise that was going into the interior of the country.

Prosperity continued until the beginning of the 20th century when sediment accumulation on this branch of the river diverted traffic to the Loba Arm passing through Magangué, and the Mompós Arm became standing water.
