= Battle of La Guaira =

1743 battle of the War of Jenkins' Ear

Coordinates: 10°36′00″N 66°55′59″W

- Part of the War of Jenkins' Ear
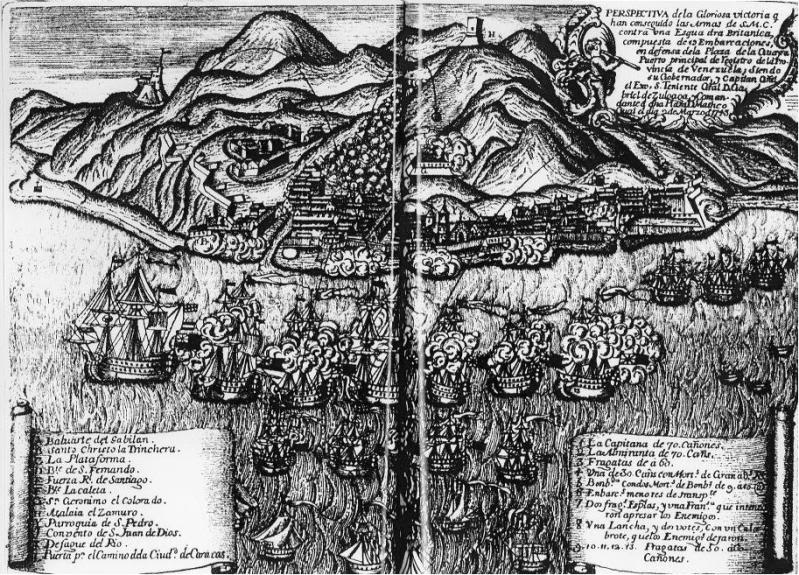
- Engraving of the battle
Date	2–5 March 1743
Location	La Guaira, Viceroyalty of New Granada
Result	Spanish victory

Belligerents
Spain	Great Britain

Commanders and leaders
Gabriel de Zuloaga; Mateo Gual; José de Iturriaga	Charles Knowles; Chaloner Ogle

Strength
1,000	2,400 troops 8 ships of line 9 frigates, bomb vessels and fire ships 2 troopships

Casualties and losses
300 killed or wounded	97 killed 308 wounded

The Battle of La Guaira (also known as the Battle of La Guayra) took place between 2–5 March 1743 in the Caribbean, off the coast of La Guaira, present day Venezuela. La Guaira was a port of the Royal Gipuzkoan Company of Caracas, whose ships had rendered great assistance to the Spanish navy during War of Jenkins' Ear in carrying troops, arms, stores and ammunition from Spain to her colonies, and its destruction would be a severe blow both to the Company and the Spanish Government. A British expeditionary fleet under Charles Knowles was defeated, and the expedition ended in failure. 97 of Knowles' men were killed, among whom was the captain of HMS Burford, and many of the ships were badly damaged or lost. Knowles was therefore unable to proceed to Puerto Cabello until he had refitted.

== Background ==
The British Admiralty had decided to prosecute the Ear Jenkins war against the Spanish settlements, though on a different scale from that of the great expeditions of 1741 and 1742.

Sir Chaloner Ogle, who had replaced Admiral Edward Vernon after the defeat at the Battle of Cartagena de Indias in 1741, prepared an invasion of another important commercial port on the Spanish Main. Believing La Guaira to be not well defended, Sir Chaloner Ogle wanted to take advantage and attack. On 22 February 1743, Sir Charles Knowles sailed from the island of Antigua with 19 ships.

Knowles underestimated the defences of La Guaira, believing it to be less well defended than Cartagena de Indias had been. He arrived at La Tortuga island on 27 February. It is said that the Spaniards had a two month warning before the attack and therefore they had time to recruit extra defenders and obtain gunpowder from the Dutch. Whether this is true or not cannot definitely be stated.

== Battle ==
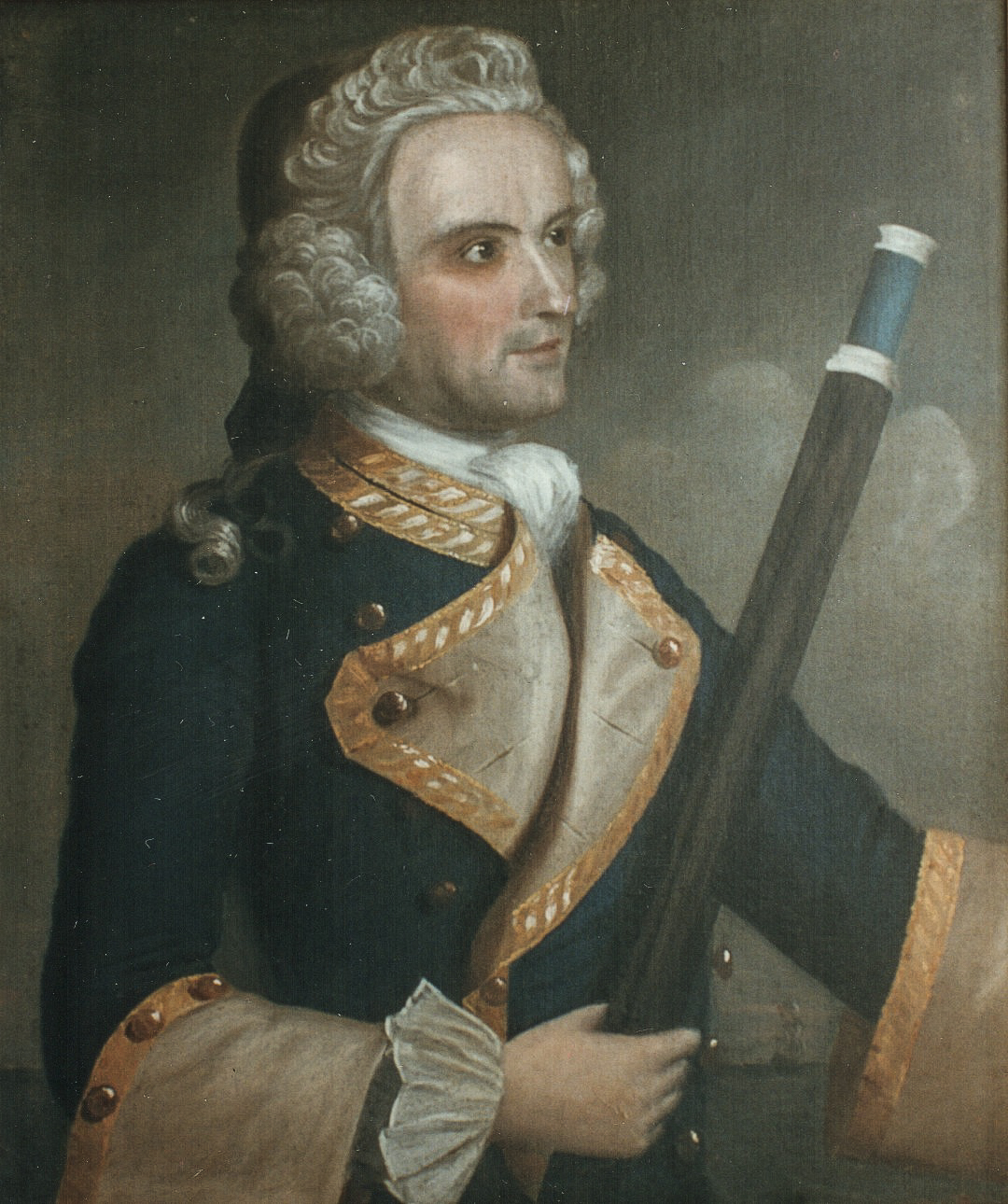
Charles Knowles, who commanded the British forces at the battle

At first light of the day, Knowles' squadron was 15 miles (24 km) east of the port of La Guaira and Otter was sent ahead to reconnoitre the inner harbour. Spanish lookouts lit signal fires at 6:30 A.M., alerting the people at both La Guaira and Caracas and bringing Governor Gabriel de Zuloaga 25 miles (40 km) down to the coast with a large body of militia that had been recruited from Colonel Dalzell's regiment in the West Indies. The commander of the Spanish garrison Mateo Gual and Captain José de Iturriaga prepared for an impending assault supplied with gunpowder by the Dutchs. About midday HMS Burford stood into the roadstead, followed by HMS Eltham, Norwich, Suffolk, Advice and Assistance. Despite the hail of rounds from six batteries the English man-of-war anchored in a double line by 1:00 P.M. and began a furious exchange. The Spanish counterfire proved unexpectedly heavy and accurate and this combined with a heavy swell prevented any British disembarkation. The Spanish had been forewarned of Knowles's intentions to capture La Guaira.

After three and a half hours, Burford cut the anchor cable and moved out of range; the frigate Eltham had also been damaged. Both accidentally ran afoul of Norwich, and all three ships left the action, reducing Knowles's overall effort. Shooting ceased at sundown, around 8:00 P.M, with the battered HMS Burford seeking shelter to leeward, escorted by HMS Norwich, Otter, and Assistance which could not anchor. The English resumed a rather desultorily bombardment at dawn the following day with the bomb vessel Comet. De Zuloaga was obliged to return to Caracas his capital on 4 March to reassure an uneasy populace that the enemy had not come ashore. At 3:00 A.M on 5 March Knowles sent boat parties into La Guaira's roadstead, they boarded a French merchantman before being discovered and driven off.

== Aftermath ==
Having suffered 97 killed and 308 wounded over three days, Knowles decided to retire to west before sunrise on 6 March and attack nearby Puerto Cabello. Despite instructing his captains to rendezvous at Borburata Keys—4 miles (6.4 km) east of Puerto Cabello—the detached Burford, Norwich, Assistance, and Otter proceeded to Curaçao, compelling the commodore to angrily follow them in. On 28 March he sent his smaller ships to cruise off Puerto Cabello, and once his main body had been refitted, went to sea again on 31 March, only to then struggle against contrary winds and currents for two weeks before finally diverting to the eastern tip of Santo Domingo by 19 April.

== British order of battle ==
Ship	Guns	Commander	Crew	Killed	Wounded	Ref.
Suffolk	70	Captain Charles Knowles	380	30	80	
Burford	70	Captain Franklin Lushington (DOW)	380	24	50	
Norwich	50	Captain Thomas Gregory	250	1	11	
Advice	50	Captain Elliot Smith	250	7	15	
Assistance	50	Captain Smith Callis	250	12	71	
Eltham	40	Captain Richard Watkins	210	14	55	
Lively	20	Captain Henry Stewart	120	7	24	
Scarborough	20	Commander Lachlin Leslie	120	0	2	
Otter	14	Commander John Gage	45	0	0	
Comet	8	Commander Richard Tyrell	40	0	0	
