= Richard Tyrell =

Royal Navy officer (1716–1766)

Rear-Admiral Richard Tyrell
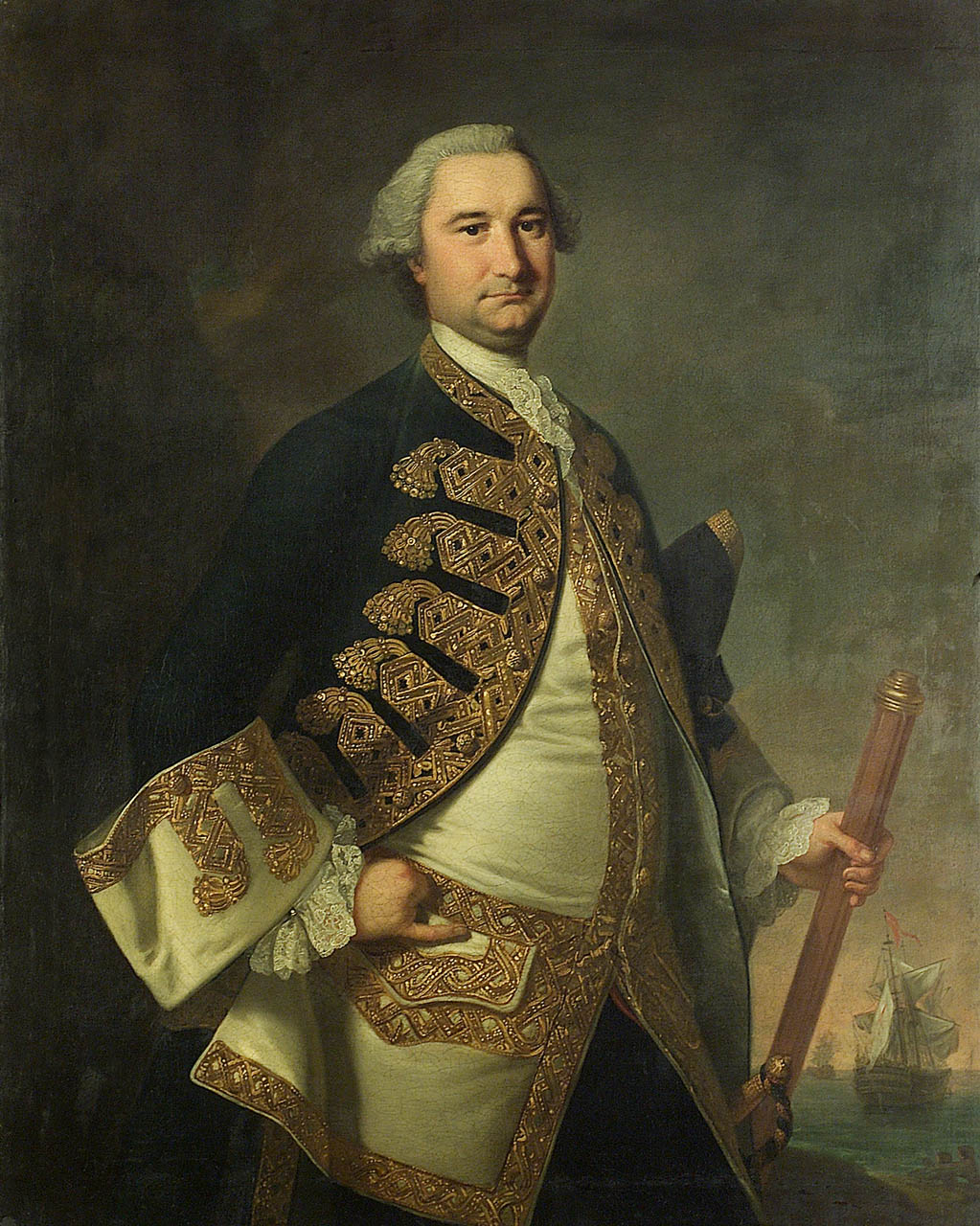
- Portrait by Thomas Hudson, 1759–1762
- Born: 1716; Dublin, Ireland
- Died: 26 June 1766 (aged 49–50); HMS Princess Louisa
- Spouse: Russell Tankard
- Military career
- Allegiance: Great Britain
- Branch: Royal Navy
- Service years: 1736–1766
- Rank: Rear-Admiral of the White
- Commands: HMS Comet; HMS Launceston; HMS Deal Castle; HMS Lyme; HMS Centaur; HMS Ipswich; HMS Buckingham; HMS Foudroyant; HMS Princess Louisa; Leeward Islands Station
- Conflicts: War of Jenkins' Ear; Battle of La Guaira; Seven Years' War; Battle of Martinique (1759); Invasion of Guadeloupe (1759)

Rear-Admiral of the White Richard Tyrell (1716 – 26 June 1766) was a Royal Navy officer who served in the War of Jenkins' Ear and Seven Years' War.

== Background ==
He was born in Dublin in 1716, the son of James and Mary Tyrell. He had two sisters, whose married names were Catherine Reily and Ann Barnes. Tyrell was a nephew of Sir Peter Warren, and entered the Royal Navy in 1736, spending most of his active service in the West Indies.

== Military career ==
His first post was as lieutenant on the 44-gun HMS Launceston in January 1741 under Warren. In March 1742 he was given command of the eight-gun HMS Comet. He was promoted to post-captain in December 1743 replacing Warren on Launceston. In September 1744 he transferred to the 20-gun HMS Deal Castle. Stationed in the West Indies, he captured the French privateers La Bien Aime, La Fidele and La Providence. In June 1745 he transferred to HMS Lyme. In April 1746 he captured the corvette La Saxonne off the Leeward Islands. In April 1747 he transferred to HMS Centaur, remaining in the West Indies.

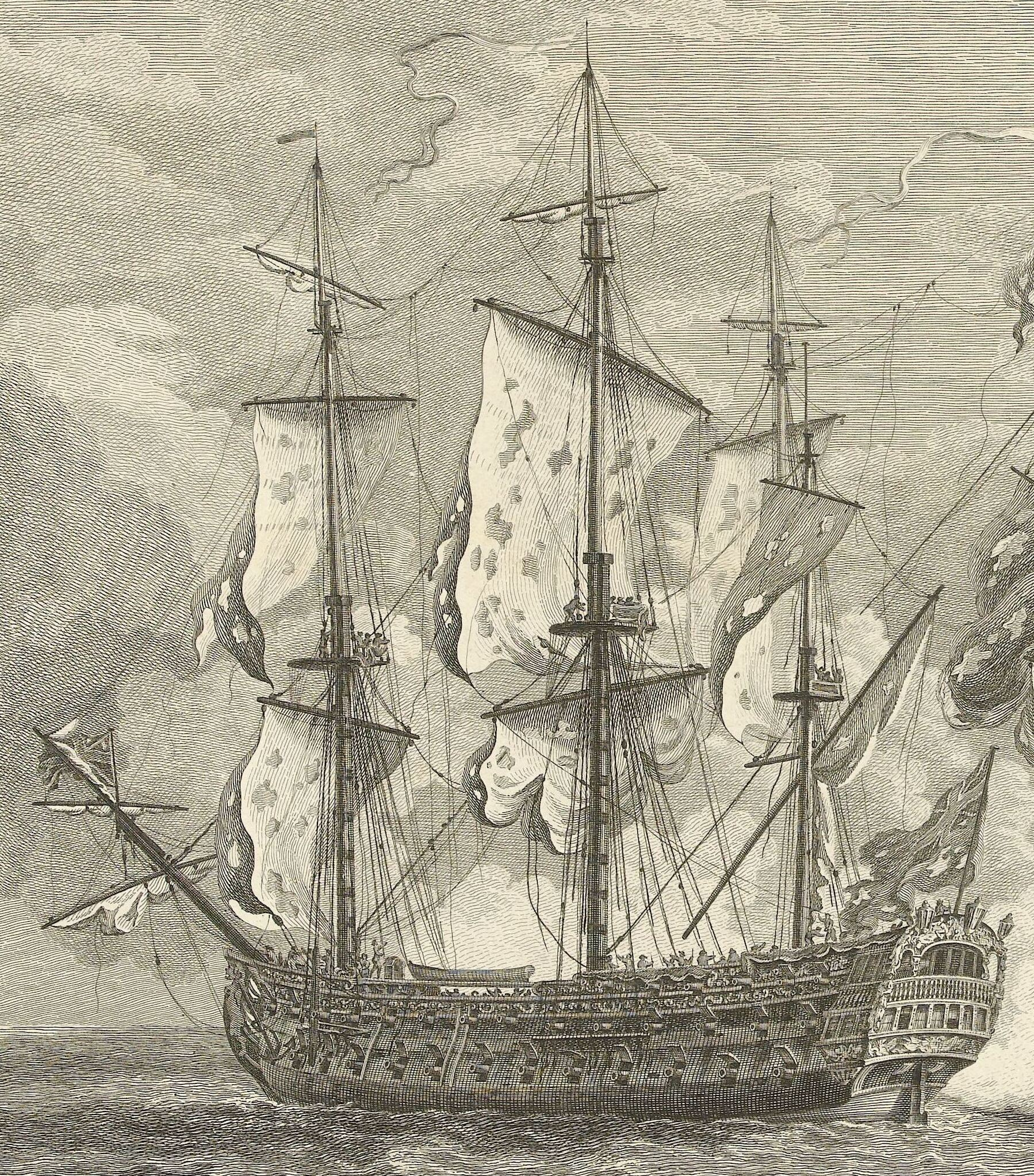
HMS Buckingham, which Tyrell commanded from 1757 to 1759

From September 1749 to February 1755 he took an extended leave, probably to attend his family. He then took command of the 64 gun HMS Ipswich until March 1757. After another break in May 1757 he took command of the 74-gun HMS Buckingham and its crew of 472 men and commanded her during the Seven Years' War. On 3 November 1758 Buckingham engaged a French squadron of one ship of the line and three frgates. In this action Tyrell was wounded several times and lost three fingers on his right hand.

In January 1759 Tyrell participated in the failed British invasion of Martinique before being present at Britain's capture of Guadeloupe, where he distinguished himself. In June 1759 he was given command of the huge HMS Foudroyant which had been captured from the French at the Battle of Cartagena. He was promoted to Rear-Admiral of the White on 21 October 1762. He was appointed Commander-in-Chief, Leeward Islands in 1765.

Having resigned command of the Leeward Islands Station in 1766, he died of fever on 26 June 1766 on board HMS Princess Louisa, and was buried at sea. He has a large memorial in the south nave aisle of Westminster Abbey. The extraordinary monument originally featured a figure floating heavenward, detached from its background amid a group of very flat clouds (earning it the nickname "The Pancake Monument". Meanwhile HMS Buckingham lies trapped in the coral at the bottom of the sea. It was sculpted by Nicholas Read.

== Personal life ==
In November 1747, Richard Tyrell married Russell Chester (née Tankard), a wealthy widow. She died in 1751. There were no children of that marriage. Upon his marriage, Tyrrell became a joint-owner of his father-in-law's slave plantations in Jamaica and Antigua. He became sole owner of the plantations upon his wife's death, and retained ownership until his own death in 1766. Tyrell's second wife was named Sarah Aylon. He also had a nephew named Richard Tyrell Barnes.

Military offices
Preceded by Robert Swanton	Commander-in-Chief, Leeward Islands Station; 1765–1766	Succeeded by Thomas Pye
