= Anglo-Prussian Convention =

1758 treaty between Britain and Prussia

The Anglo-Prussian Convention was agreed on 11 April 1758 between Great Britain and the Kingdom of Prussia and formalised the alliance between them that had effectively existed since the Convention of Westminster in 1756.

Both kingdoms agreed not to negotiate a separate peace. Britain promised to pay the Prussians a subsidy in gold (£670,000 a year, larger than any wartime subsidies that Britain had ever given to an ally). In exchange, Britain hoped that the Prussians would supply infantry and cavalry to the German Army of Observation, commanded by Ferdinand of Brunswick, to defend the Electorate of Hanover and neighbouring territories. Nicholas Magens and George Amyand supplied the money.

It was also agreed that the British would provide a garrison for the port of Emden, which had been in 1757 re-captured from French and Austrian forces by the Allies. That was a significant development, as Britain had refused to deploy troops on the Continent, and the Secretary of State, William Pitt had dismissed the prospect just months before.

Neither Britain or Prussia could foresee the actual length of the conflict or the ultimate intra-alliance frictions that were to arise. Both sides believed at first that the war would not extend past one or two campaigns.

The alliance between the two states lasted until 30 April 1762, when it was dissolved by John Stuart, 3rd Earl of Bute in acrimony. King George III supported Bute and George Grenville, against the Duke of Newcastle and Pitt.

== Sources ==
- Dull, Jonathan R. The French Navy and the Seven Years' War. University of Nebraska Press, 2005.
- Szabo, Franz A.J. The Seven Years' War in Europe, 1756-1763. Pearson, 2008.
- Spencer, Frank (1956) THE ANGLO-PRUSSIAN BREACH OF 1762: AN HISTORICAL REVISION. In: History, pp. 100–102.
- Schweizer, Karl W. (1977) Lord Bute, Newcastle, Prussia, and the Hague Overtures: A Re-Examination Published online: 11 July 2014
