= Stephen Niblett =

English academic administrator

Stephen Niblett D.D. (1697–1766) was an English academic administrator at the University of Oxford.

Niblett was elected Warden (head) of All Souls College, Oxford in 1726, a post he held until 1766. During his time as Warden of All Souls College, he was also Vice-Chancellor of Oxford University from 1735 until 1738.

A monument to Niblett and his wife Elizabeth was erected at All Souls College, Oxford in 1766, being sculpted by Nicholas Read.

Academic offices
Preceded by Bernard Gardiner	Warden of All Souls College, Oxford; 1726–1766	Succeeded by John Tracy, Viscount Tracy
Preceded by William Holmes	Vice-Chancellor of Oxford University; 1735–1738	Succeeded by Theophilus Leigh
