= Battle of Puerto Cabello =

1743 battle

- Part of the War of Jenkins' Ear
Date	16 April 1743
Location	Puerto Cabello, Viceroyalty of New Granada present-day Venezuela
Result	Spanish victory

Belligerents
Great Britain	Spain

Commanders and leaders
Charles Knowles	Gabriel Zuloaga

Strength
Land: 4,000 infantry sailors Sea: 2 third-rates 2 fourth rates 1 fifth-rate 2 sixth-rates 1 sloop-of-war 1 bomb vessel 13 other vessels	Land: 2,000 infantry militia unknown artillery 1 castle 2 shore batteries Sea: 1 blockship

Casualties and losses
100 killed or wounded	Unknown killed or wounded 1 blockship scuttled

The Battle of Puerto Cabello was a failed attack on a Spanish colonial port during the War of Jenkins' Ear on 16 April 1743.

== Background ==
The British naval forces under commodore Sir Charles Knowles had failed against the Spaniards in the attack at La Guaira (2 March 1743). La Guaira was as it still is; the port of Caracas and an important shipping centre of Royal Gipuzkoan Company. It was believed by the Admiralty to be very weakly defended, an opinion possibly based on the report of the ships which attacked it in 1739.

Knowles prepared to sail toward a new Caribbean objective, Puerto Cabello. Puerto Cabello was the careening port of the Royal Gipuzkoan Company, whose ships had rendered great assistance to the Spanish navy during the war in carrying troops, arms, stores and ammunition from Spain to her colonies, and its destruction would be a severe blow both to the Company and the Spanish Crown. The Royal Navy fleet included:

HMS Suffolk 70 gun third-rate
HMS Burford 70 gun third-rate
HMS Norwich 50 gun fourth-rate
HMS Assistance 50 gun fourth-rate
HMS Eltham 40 gun fifth-rate
HMS Scarborough 24 gun sixth-rate
HMS Lively 20 gun sixth-rate
HMS Otter 14 gun sloop
HMS Comet 8 gun bomb vessel

== Battle ==
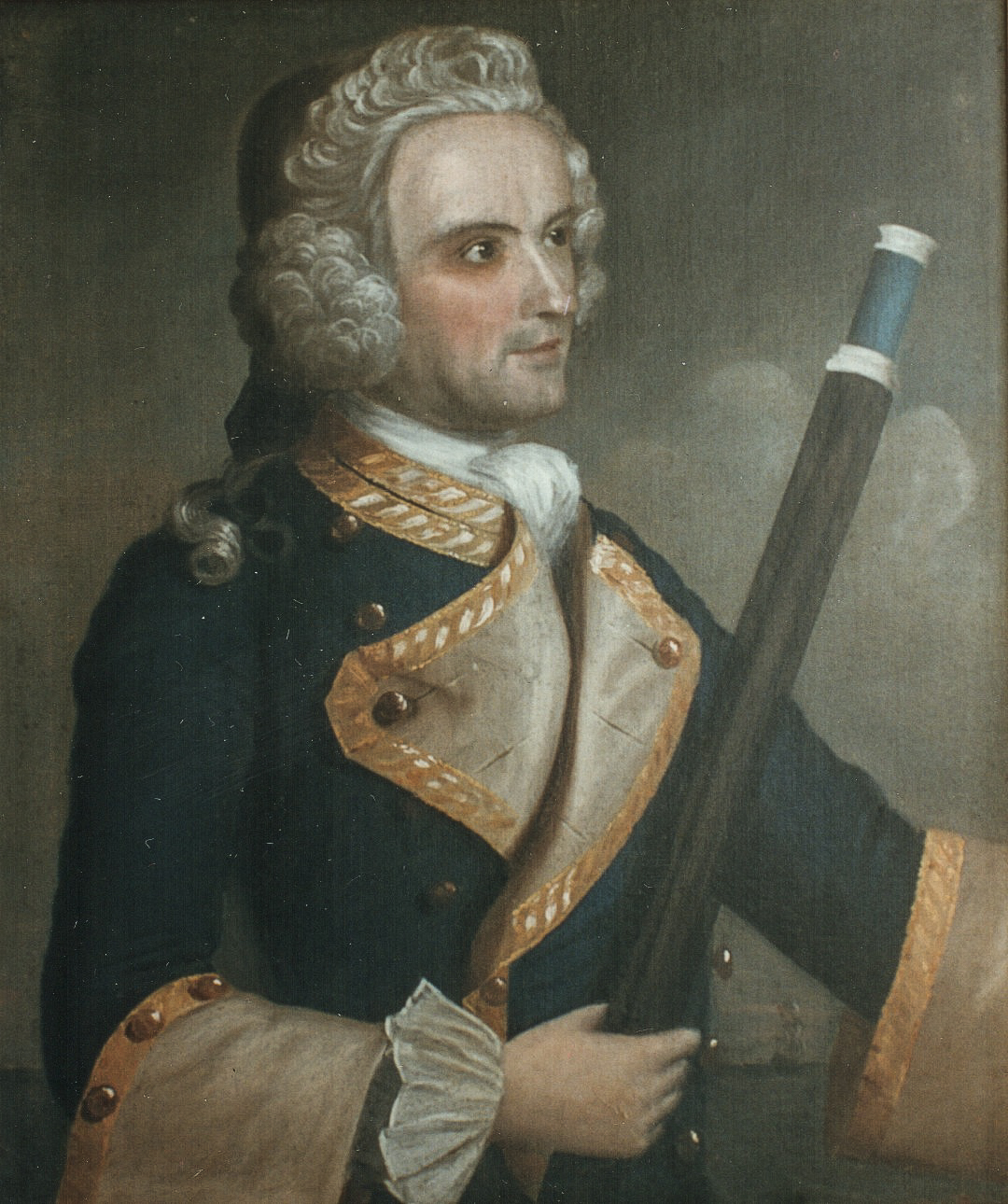
Charles Knowles, who commanded the British forces at the battle

Knowles and his fleet arrived from La Guaira four miles northeast of the Spanish port of Borburata, he first sent the bomb vessel HMS Comet to take up station inshore while he prepared the remainder of this expedition for an assault in Puerto Cabello. Around this time the Spaniards sighted HMS Otter and instantly raised the alarm. The next day the 50-gun HMS Norwich, the 40-gun HMS Eltham and the 20-gun Lively moved in to bombard two small Spanish batteries. This attack was intended to wear the batteries' defenders, after which a large force would be disembarked nearby under cover of darkness to overwhelm the isolated outposts and turn the artillery against San Felipe Castle, the harbour's main fortification.

Knowles' operation started well, with three warships in action they pounded the batteries until 7:00 P.M., after the bombardment, a British landing force 1,100-1,200 men were landed unseen under Major Lucas at 10:30 P.M. But, upon advancing, the landing force stumbled into a 40-man Spanish company with two small cannons and grape shot. This small company opened fire on the attackers, who retreated back to their boats. On 28 April the three Royal Navy warships resumed their offshore bombardment to little effect. On 2 May Caracas's Governor Gabriel de Zuloaga arrived overland with reinforcements for the Spanish garrison, a normal complement is three companies of regulars and 300-400 militia. Sometime the next day, Governor de Zuloaga was wounded in the leg by British fire after inspecting the Punta Brava battery.

By now, running low on ammunition and provisions, Knowles decided to attempt a general assault on 4 May. However, the wind died down before the British squadron could get under way at 1:00 P.M., so the operation was postponed until 5 May. On that day, Knowles weighed anchor at 11:00 A.M., prompting the Spaniards to man their defenses. HMS Assistance, HMS Burford, HMS Suffolk, and HMS Norwich were to batter San Felipe Castle while HMS Scarborough, HMS Lively, and HMS Eltham engage the batteries to the north.

Another battle began shortly after 1:00 P.M, on 5 May, the warships anchored so close to San Felipe castle that only one of its guns could be suppressed. At 4:00 P.M. the wind rose, and de Zuloaga suspected the British would charge the harbor mouth. He therefore ordered a blockship to be scuttled in the harbor entrance. Upon seeing the channel closing; Knowles gave the signal to retire, two and a half hours later, only to see his formation become becalmed. The British suffered heavily before eventually retreating out of range by 9:00 P.M.

== Aftermath ==
Having endured about 100 casualties during this desperate gamble, plus another 100 during previous tries, Knowles ordered his most crippled ships to make for the Borburata Keys on the morning of 7 May while continued to shell the Puerto Cabello's inner harbor with his lone bomb vessel. The commodore Knowles eventually offered a prisoner exchange to Zuloaga, and, after being allowed to fresh water by the begrudging governor, sailed away with two divisions on 11 and 13 May to Jamaica.

== Bibliography ==
- David E. Marley, Wars of the Americas; A Chronology of Armed Conflict in the New World, 1492 to the Present ABC-Clio Inc, 1998 ISBN 0-87436-837-5
- The Navy In the War of 1739-48. Cambridge University Press
- Duro, Cesáreo Fernández (1900). Armada española desde la unión de los reinos de Castilla y de León, Vol. VI. Madrid, Est. tipográfico "Sucesores de Rivadeneyra".
