= HMS Buckingham (1751) =

Ship of the line of the Royal Navy

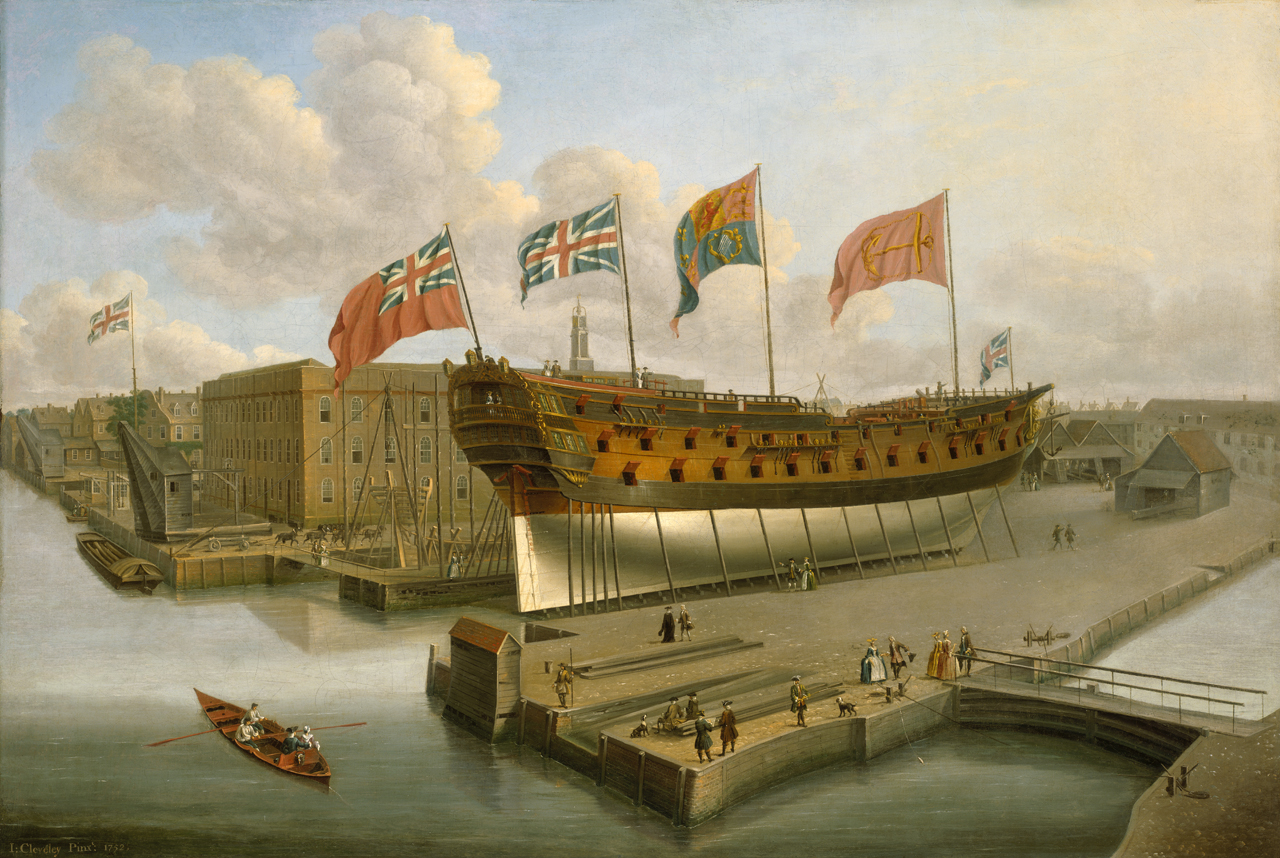
- 1752 painting of Buckingham on the stocks at Deptford Dockyard

History

Great Britain
- Name: HMS Buckingham
- Ordered: 15 November 1745
- Builder: John Hollond, Deptford Dockyard
- Laid down: 26 January 1746
- Launched: 30 April 1751
- Commissioned: May 1755
- Renamed: HMS Grampus, 1777
- Fate: Sank, Atlantic Ocean, 11 November 1779

General characteristics
- Class & type: 1745 Establishment 70-gun third-rate ship of the line
- Tons burthen: 1435 62/94 (bm)
- Length: 160 ft 0 in (48.8 m) (gundeck); 131 ft 4 in (40.0 m) (gundeck)
- Beam: 45 ft 4 in (13.8 m)
- Depth of hold: 19 ft 4 in (5.9 m)
- Sail plan: Full-rigged ship
- Complement: 520
- Armament: 70 guns: Gundeck: 26 × 32 pdrs; Upper deck: 28 × 18 pdrs; Quarterdeck: 12 × 9 pdrs; Forecastle: 4 × 9 pdrs

HMS Buckingham was a 70-gun third-rate ship of the line of the Royal Navy. Built at Deptford Dockyard to the draught specified by the 1745 Establishment, she was commissioned in 1755 and served in the Seven Years' War. With a crew of 520 she was one of the largest ships in the Navy at that time. Buckingham was renamed HMS Grampus in 1771 and sank on 11 November 1779 while crossing the North Atlantic Ocean.

== Service ==
She was launched at Deptford in May 1751 at a cost of £29,000 then taken to Chatham Dockyard for fitting out to Royal Navy specification (including addition of guns) at a cost of around £8000. She was commissioned and formally brought into service in 1755 and put under command of Captain Michael Everitt who sailed her to the Mediterranean with Admiral John Byng's fleet. On 20 May 1756 she took place in the Battle of Minorca. Immediately after the battle command passed to Captain Edward Pratten who took her to the Leeward Islands immediately after repairs at Chatham. In May 1757 command passed to Richard Tyrell.

From 1756 to 1757 Temple West served as her captain.

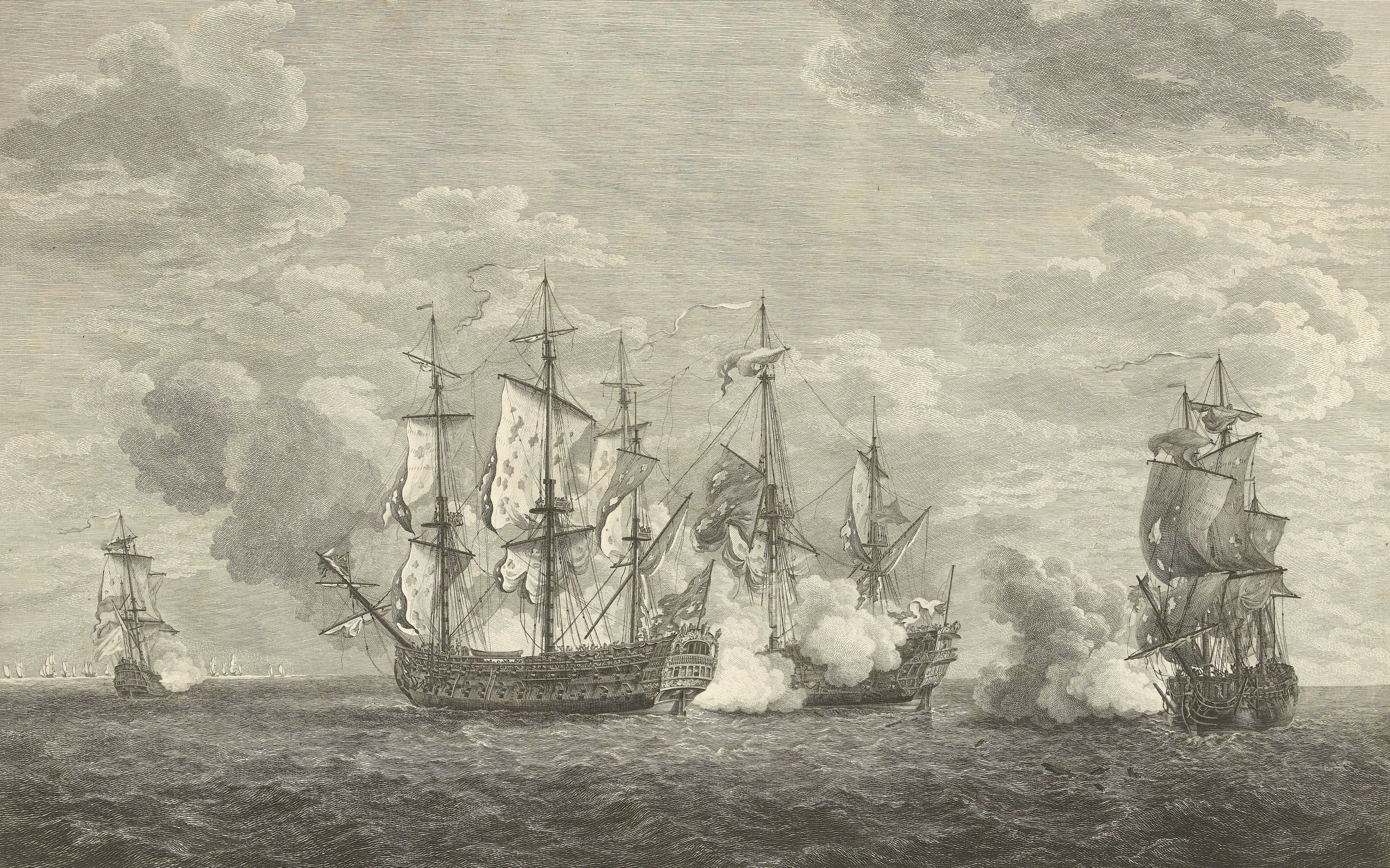
Buckingham (second from left) engaging three French ships on 3 November 1758

On 3 November 1758, Buckingham, commanded by Captain Richard Tyrell, joined with HMS Weazel to engage a French squadron off the coast of Montserrat. The French squadron comprised the 74-gun Florissant and the frigates Egrette (38) and Atalante (28). The egnagement lasted for four hours with both Buckingham and Florissant taking considerable damage. Florissant was able to disentangle from Buckingham and sail off before the British could board her.

In January 1759 she went to Martinique where on 16th she took part in the Battle of Martinique and capture of Guadeloupe on 20th. A few days after command passed to Captain Lachlan Leslie and then passed to Peter Parker in May.

In 1771 Buckingham was converted to a storeship at Chatham Dockyard, and in 1777 was renamed HMS Grampus, under Captain Ambrose Reddall. Her armament was reduced to 30 guns and her crew reduced to 230 men.

American Revolution: On 15 April 1778 she sailed from Newport, Rhode Island taking General John Burgoyne and some of his Officers back to England, arriving in early May. Early on in the voyage they recaptured a prize on the Grand Banks that had been taken by USS Revenge.

Command passed in October 1778 to George Anson Byron, she sailed for Jamaica on 26 December 1778 to resupply the Royal Navy garrison. In April 1779 her command was transferred to Commander Thomas Stanhope Bennett, who sailed her to Newfoundland to collect supplies of timber. She was leaking badly on her return voyage to England, and foundered on 11 November 1779 while crossing the North Atlantic Ocean.
