= HMS Suffolk (1680) =

Ship of the line of the Royal Navy

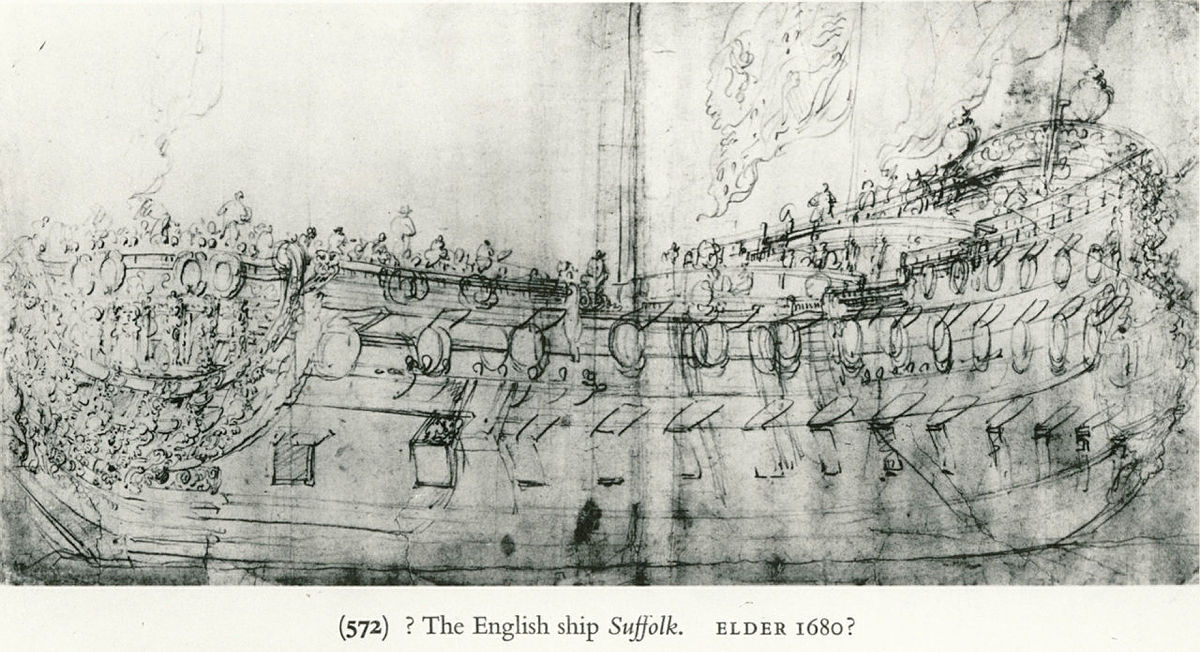
- Drawing of the launching of the ship by Van de Velde the Elder, 1680.

History

Kingdom of England
- Name: HMS Suffolk
- Ordered: 20 February 1678
- Builder: Sir Henry Johnson, Blackwall Yard
- Launched: May 1680
- Commissioned: 11 August 1680
- Honours and awards: Barfleur 1692; Gibraltar 1704; Velez-Malaga 1704
- Fate: Broken up, 1765

General characteristics as built
- Class & type: 70-gun third-rate ship of the line
- Tons burthen: 104123/94 tons(bm)
- Length: 150 ft 10 in (45.97 m) gundeck; 121 ft 4 in (36.98 m) keel for tonnage
- Beam: 40 ft 2 in (12.24 m)
- Draught: 18 ft (5.49 m)
- Depth of hold: 16 ft 9.5 in (5.12 m)
- Propulsion: Sails
- Sail plan: Full-rigged ship
- Armament: 1677 Establishment 72/60 guns; 26 × demi-cannons 54 cwt – 9.5 ft (LD); 26 × 12-pdr guns 32 cwt – 9 ft (UD); 10 × sakers 16 cwt – 7 ft (QD); 4 × sakers 16 cwt – 7 ft (Fc); 5 × 5 3-pdr guns 5 cwt – 5 ft (RH)

General characteristics after 1699 rebuild
- Class & type: 70-gun third-rate ship of the line
- Tons burthen: 1,07517/94 tons (bm)
- Length: 151 ft 4 in (46.13 m) gundeck; 124 ft 0 in (37.8 m) keel for tonnage
- Beam: 40 ft 4.5 in (12.3 m)
- Depth of hold: 16 ft 7.5 in (5.1 m)
- Propulsion: Sails
- Sail plan: Full-rigged ship
- Armament: 26 × demi-cannons 54 cwt - 9.5 ft (LD); 26 × 12-pdr guns 32 cwt – 9 ft (UD); 10 × sakers 16 cwt – 7 ft (QD); 4 × sakers 16 cwt – 7 ft (Fc); 5 × 5 3-pdr guns 5 cwt – 5 ft (RH)

General characteristics after 1718 rebuild
- Class & type: 1706 Establishment 70-gun third-rate ship of the line
- Tons burthen: 1,1294/94 tons (bm)
- Length: 151 ft 4 in (46.1 m) gundeck; 125 ft 3 in (38.2 m) keel for tonnage
- Beam: 41 ft 2 in (12.5 m)
- Depth of hold: 17 ft 4 in (5.3 m)
- Propulsion: Sails
- Sail plan: Full-rigged ship
- Armament: 70 guns: 26 × 24=pdr guns (LD); 26 × 12-pdr guns (UD); 14 × 6-pdr guns (QD); 4 × 6-pdr guns (Fc)

General characteristics after 1739 rebuild
- Class & type: 70-gun third-rate ship of the line
- Tons burthen: 1,2248/94 tons (bm)
- Length: 151 ft 0 in (46.0 m) gundeck; 122 ft 1 in (37.2 m) keel for tonnage
- Beam: 43 ft 5 in (13.2 m)
- Depth of hold: 17 ft 9 in (5.4 m)
- Propulsion: Sails
- Sail plan: Full-rigged ship
- Armament: 70 guns: 26 × 24=pdr guns (LD); 26 × 12-pdr guns (UD); 14 × 6-pdr guns (QD); 4 × 6-pdr guns (Fc)

HMS Suffolk was a 70-gun third-rate ship of the line of the Royal Navy, built by contract of 20 February 1678 by Sir Henry Johnson at Blackwall. She participated in the War of the English Succession 1689 - 1697, in the Battles of Beachy Head and Barfleur. She was rebuilt in 1699. She was actively involved in the War of Spanish Succession 1702 - 1713. Her later career was as guard ship duties, deployments to the Baltic Sea and the West Indies. She was finally broken in 1765 after lying in Ordinary for almost twenty years.

She was the first vessel to bear the name Suffolk in the English and Royal Navy.

HMS Suffolk was awarded the Battle Honours Barfleur 1692, Gibraltar 1704, and Velez-Malaga 1704.

== Construction and specifications ==
Suffolk was ordered on 20 February 1678 to be built under contract by Sir Henry Johnson of Blackwall on the River Thames. She was launched in May 1680. Her dimensions were a gun deck of 150 feet 10 inches (45.97 metres) with a keel of 121 feet 4 inches (36.98 metres) for tonnage calculation with a breadth of 40 feet 2 inches (12.24 metres) and a depth of hold of 16 feet 9.5 inches (5.12 metres). Her builder's measure tonnage was calculated as 1,04123/94 tons. Her draught was 18 feet 0 inches (5.49 metres).

Her initial gun armament was in accordance with the 1677 Establishment with 72/60 guns consisting of twenty-six demi-cannons (54 cwt, 9.5 ft) on the lower deck, twenty-six 12-pounder guns (32 cwt, 9 ft) on the upper deck, ten sakers (16 cwt, 7 ft) on the quarterdeck and four sakers (16 cwt, 7 ft) on the forecastle with four 3-pounder guns (5 cwt, 5 ft) on the poop deck or roundhouse. By 1688 she would carry 70 guns as per the 1685 Establishment. Her initial manning establishment would be for a crew of 460/380/300 personnel.

== Commissioned service ==
=== Service 1680 to 1699 ===
Suffolk was commissioned on 11 August 1680 under the command of Captain John Perryman for delivery to Chatham Dockyard. Perryman died on 4 September. In 1689 she was under the command of Captain Matthew Aylmer for fleet service. She was under Captain Woolfran Cornwall in 1690. Suffolk fought in the Battle of Beachy Head in the centre (red) squadron on 30 June. On 2 January 1691 she came under the command of Captain Peregrine Osbourne, Earl of Danby, followed by Captain Christopher Billop. She fought in the Battle of Barfleur in the rear (blue) squadron of the rear division between 19 and 22 May 1692. In 1693 Suffolk was under Captain James Wishart, followed by Captain Robert Robinson sailing with Lord Berkeley's Squadron. In March 1696 she was under the command of Captain John Johnson as the flagship of Admiral John Benbow on special service. In 1699 she was under the command of Captain Stafford Fairborne. She would be rebuilt at Blackwall in the same year.

=== Rebuild at Blackwall 1699 ===
She was ordered to be rebuilt under contract by Johnson of Blackwall. She was launched/completed in April. Her dimensions were a gun deck of 151 feet 4 inches (46.13 metres) with a keel of 124 feet 0 inches (37.80 metres) for tonnage calculation with a breadth of 40 feet 4.5 inches (12.31 metres) and a depth of hold of 16 feet 7.5 inches (5.07 metres). Her builder's measure tonnage was calculated as 1,07517/94 tons.

She probably retained her armament as stated in the 1685 Establishment, though it is unclear if her armament was changed to the 1703 Establishment later. It is known that when completed her gun armament total at least 70 guns.

=== Service 1701 to 1717 ===
Suffolk was commissioned in 1701 under Captain Thomas Foulis and stationed at Spithead with a reduced crew. With the outbreak of the War of the Spanish Succession in May 1702, she was under Captain Edward Good sailing with Sir Cloudesley Shovell's fleet in October. In 1703 she was under Captain Robert Kirton assigned to Sir George Rooke's fleet. She participated in the Capture of Gibraltar on 24 July 1704. She followed this in the Battle Velez-Malaga in the centre division on 13 August. Suffolk suffered 13 killed and 38 wounded in the battle.

In 1705 Suffolk was under Captain William Wakelin serving as flagship of Rear-Admiral William Whetstone in the West Indies. Wakelin died on 1 October 1705. In 1708 Captain William Clevland was her commander with Admiral George Byng's fleet in the English Channel. She proceeded to Lisbon in October and was in the Mediterranean from 1709. She captured the 38-gun Le Gaillard on 2 May 1710. Suffolk was ordered home in July 1711.

=== Rebuild/repair at Chatham Dockyard 1716/18 ===
Suffolk was ordered to be rebuilt or repaired at Chatham Dockyard under the guidance of Benjamin Rosewell on 8 March 1716. She was launched/completed on 20 November 1718. Her dimensions were a gun deck of 151 feet 4 inches (46.13 metres) with a keel of 125 feet 3 inches (38.18 metres) for tonnage calculation with a breadth of 41 feet 2 inches (12.55 metres) and a depth of hold of 17 feet 4 inches (5.28 metres). Her builder's measure tonnage was calculated as 1,1294/94 tons.

Her armament was in accordance with the 1716 Establishment of 70 guns consisting of twenty-six 24-pounder guns on the lower deck, twenty-six 12-pounder guns on the upper deck, fourteen 6-pounder guns on the quarterdeck, and four 6-pounder guns on the foc's'le. Her crew size was established as 440 personnel.

=== Service 1719 to 1736 ===
Suffolk was commissioned in 1719 under the command of Captain Charles Stewart for service with Admiral Sir John Norris's Baltic Fleet. In 1720 she was under Captain John Cooper. She was paid off in 1721. In 1727 she was recommissioned under Captain John Cockburn for service in the Baltic Sea. She then joined Vice-Admiral Sir Charles Wager's fleet in the Mediterranean. During the winters of 1731/32 and 1732/33 she was a guard ship at Sheerness Dockyard. In 1733 she was under the command of Captain Philip Vanbrugh as guard ship at Sheerness. She was dismantled in January 1736 with the intent of rebuilding.

=== Rebuilding at Woolwich Dockyard 1736/39 ===
Suffolk was ordered rebuilt on 3 December 1735 at Woolwich Dockyard under the guidance of Master Shipwright John Hayward. She was launched on 5 March 1739. Her dimensions were a gun deck of 151 feet (46 metres) with a keel of 122 feet 1 inch (37.21 metres) for tonnage calculation with a breadth of 43 feet 5 inches (13.23 meters) and a depth of hold of 17 feet 9 inches (5.41 metres). Her builder's measure tonnage was calculated as 1,2248/94 tons.

Her armament was in accordance with the 1716 Establishment of 70 guns consisting of twenty-six 24-pounder guns on the lower deck, twenty-six 12-pounder guns on the upper deck, fourteen 6-pounder guns on the quarterdeck, and four 6-pounder guns on the forecastle. Her crew size was established as 440 personnel.

=== Service 1739 to 1765 ===
Suffolk was commissioned in 1739. She was assigned to Norris's fleet in 1740. She sailed for the West Indies in October 1740. She participated in the Battle of Cartagena de Indias in March/April 1741. She was recommissioned in August 1742 under Captain Charles Knowles for the Caracas expedition. In 1743 her new commander was Captain Edward Pratten sailing under the broad pennant of Knowles. During the Battle of La Guaira she suffered 30 killed with 80 wounded. She was at the Battle of Puerto Cabello on 16 then 24 April. Upon returning to home waters, she was assigned to Norris's fleet for service in the English Channel. In August/September 1744 she was assigned to Admiral Sir John Balchen's fleet. In 1745 she was under the broad pennant of Commodore FitzRoy Henry Lee in the Leeward Islands. She captured the privateer Diligent on 22 June.

== Disposition ==
Suffolk returned to home waters and was put in in ordinary. She remained inactive for almost 20 years and was finally broken on 12 June 1765.
