= Nicholas Magens =

German dealer

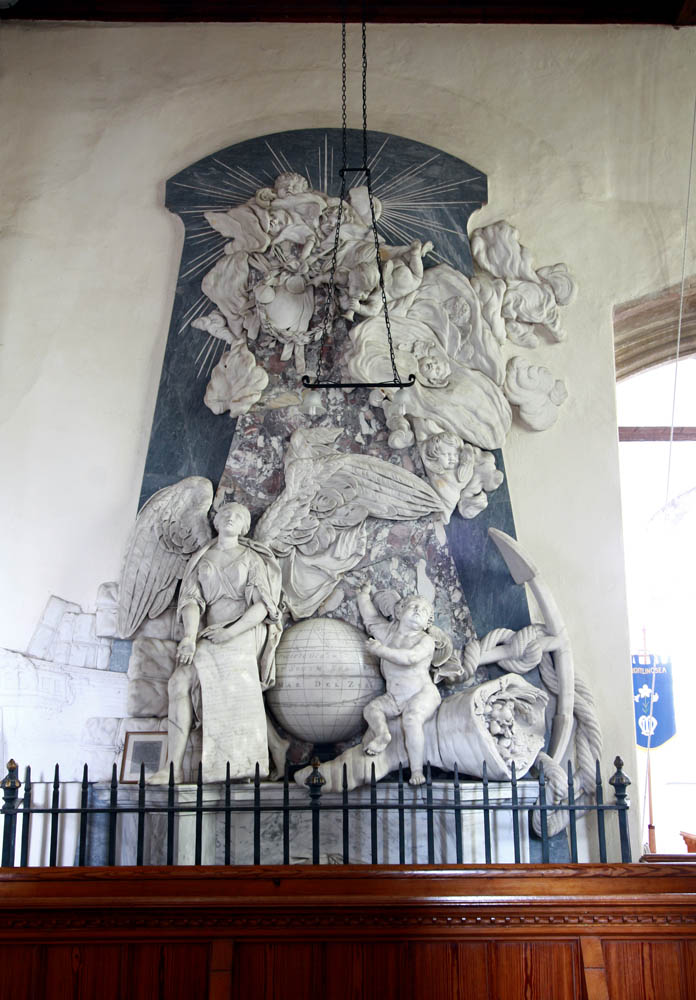
Rococo monument and epitaph for Magens in All Saints Church, Brightlingsea

Esq. Nicholas Magens or Nicolaus Paul Magens (1697 or 1704 – 1764) was an attorney, a merchant specializing in Spain and its colonies in the Americas, and an expert on ship insurance, general average and bottomry who gained a great reputation in commercial matters.

== Life ==
Nicolaus was born Neuendorf bei Elmshorn in the Duchy of Holstein. Around 1725 he lived in Cádiz and traded with Veracruz where silver from New Spain could be bought. Already in 1737 he was living in London and became a citizen when he married Elizabeth Dörrien and by royal assent; his younger brother Wilhelm settled in Cádiz. In 1741 he became one of the directors of the Royal Exchange Assurance Corporation and was given the responsibility for the complaint negotiations by the Hamburg Senate. In 1759 he seems to have been appointed by the Bank of England as director. After the Anglo-Prussian Convention, he and George Amyand were involved in two bills of exchange, to support the Duke of Brunswick. They collaborated with Henry Fox, 1st Baron Holland, Paymaster of the Forces and Adrian and Thomas Hope. In 1763 he moved to Brightlingsea, where he had bought two manors, which were inherited by his nephew Magens Dorrien Magens.

His huge monument was sculpted by Nicholas Read.

== Works ==
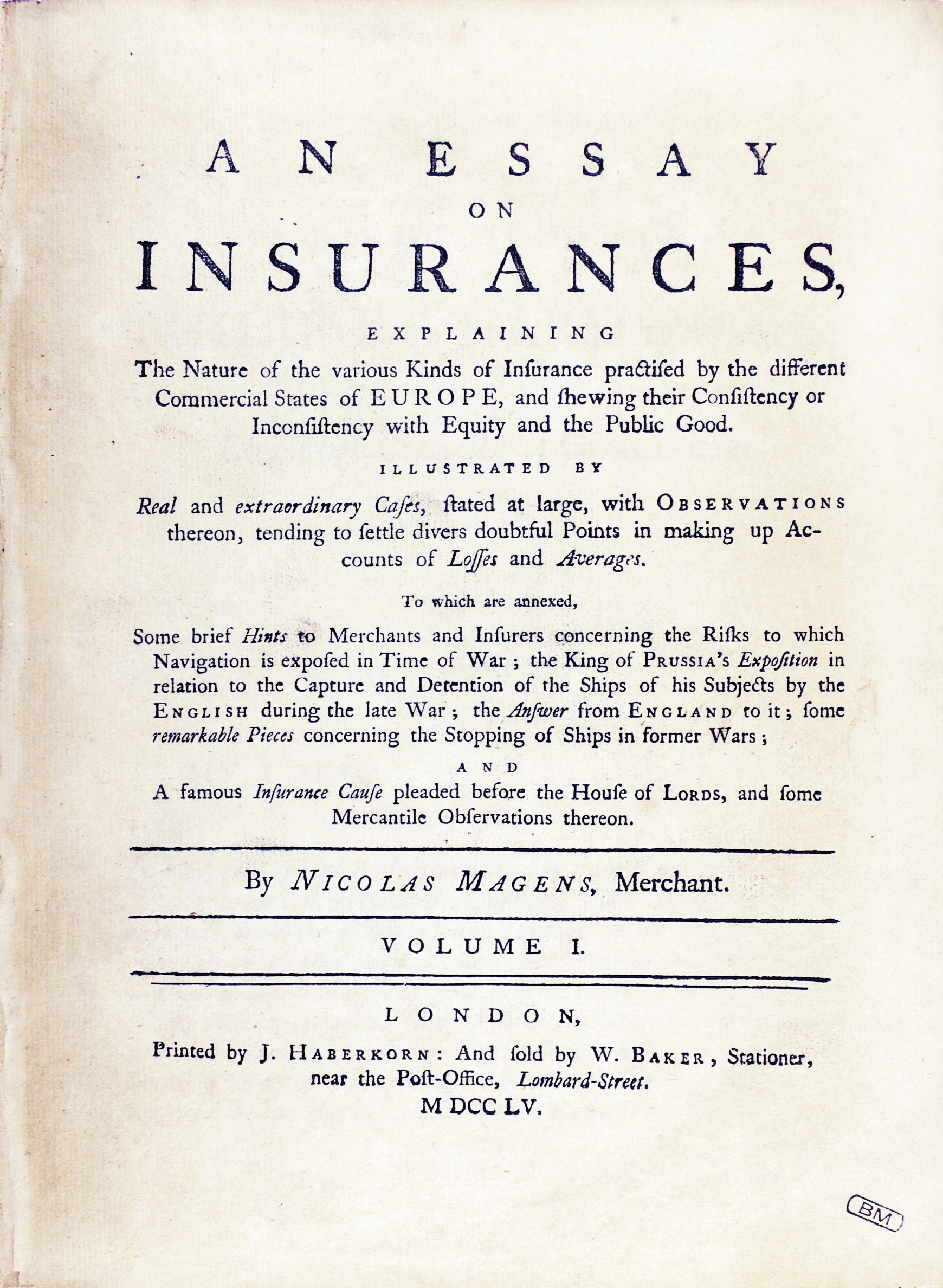
An essay on insurances, 1755 (Fondazione Mansutti, Milano).

- The Universal Merchant, Containing the Rationale of Commerce, in Theory and Practice; an Enquiry into the Nature and Genius of Banks, their Power, Use, Influence, and Efficacy; the Establishment and operative Transactions of the Banks of London and Amsterdam, their Capacity and ..., published in 1753, which was used by Adam Smith in The Wealth of Nations in regard to the estimates of the precious metals imported into Europe. William Horsley seems to have been his editor or assistance in translating.
- An Essay on Insurances: Explaining the Nature of the Various Kinds of Insurance Practiced by the Different Commercial States of Europe, and Shewing Their Consistency Or Inconsistency with Equity and the Public Good. Illustrated by Real and Extraordinary Cases, Stated at Large, with Observations Thereon, Tending to Settle Divers Doubtful Points in Making Up Accounts of Losses and Averages. To which are Annexed, Some Brief Hints to Merchants and Insurers Concerning the Risks to which Navigation is Exposed in Time of War; the King of Prussia's Exposition in Relation to the Capture and Detention of the Ships of His Subjects by the English During the Late War; the Answer from England to It; Some Remarkable Pieces Concerning the Stopping of Ships in Former Wars; and a Famous Insurance Cause Pleaded Before the House of Lords, and Some Mercantile Observations Thereon, printed in 1755, an important work on ship insurances, fundamental for the English insurance industry in those days, with the explicit intention of providing guidance to judges and lawmakers. The first volume described general features of insurance policies and a description of 36 "remarkable cases" illustrating key points. Many of these cases had been decided in London, but others were settled at Hamburg, Leghorn, Cádiz, and Lisbon, some in courts and some by arbitration. The second volume contained a translation into English of all the foreign insurance ordinances.

== Bibliography ==
- Geoffrey Clark, Insurance as an Instrument of War in the 18th Century, "The Geneva Papers on Risk and Insurance", vol. 29, no. 2 (apr. 2004), pp. 247–257.
- Robert Lee (ed.), Commerce and culture. Nineteenth-Century Business Elites, London and New York, Routledge, 2016, pp. 240–248.
- Fondazione Mansutti, Quaderni di sicurtà. Documents of the history of insurance, edited by M. Bonomelli, bibliographic cards C. Baptist, critical notes by F. Mansutti, Milan, Electa, 2011, p. 208.
