= Nicholas Read (sculptor) =

English sculptor (c. 1733–1787)

Nicholas Read (c. 1733–1787) was an 18th-century English sculptor. He was the only apprentice that Roubiliac ever accepted.

His masterpiece is the large and highly odd monument to Admiral Richard Tyrell in Westminster Abbey.

== Life ==
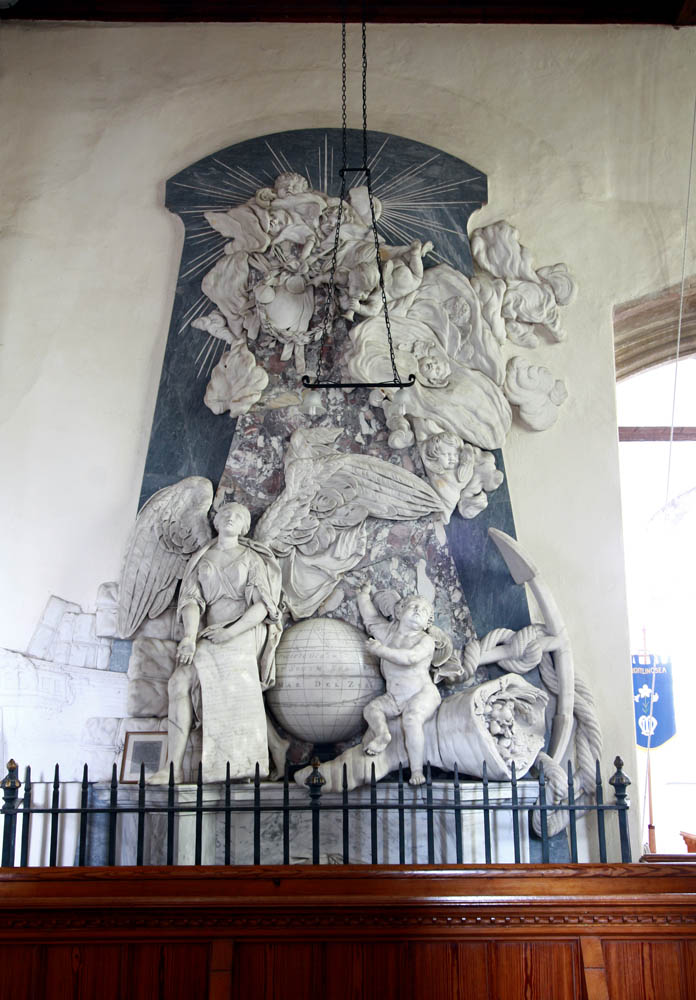
Read's monument to Nicholas Magens in All Saints Church, Brightlingsea

Read was born in London and was a pupil at St Martins Lane Academy, when his father started to press the sculptor Roubiliac to take him as an apprentice. Roubiliac had vowed not to take apprentices, but agreed to teach Read drawing and modelling. Read (without permission) worked on one of Roubiliac's busts and pleased him by the standard of his work... and so he apprenticed him from 1750 or earlier.

In 1762 Read won a "premium" of 100 guineas from the Society of Arts for a marble figure of Actaeon and his dog. On Roubiliac's death in 1762 Read took over his studio at 66 St Martins Lane.

In 1766 he created the huge monument to Admiral Tyrell in Westminster Abbey. The monument had a half naked Tyrell broken and floating upwards (detached from its background) with flat clouds (like pancakes) while below HMS Buckingham lies on the seabed trapped by the coral. The monument was moved and the figure of Tyrell removed in the 19th century. The carving of the ship was highly praised.

Read "lost his reason" (i.e. had mental health problems) from 1780 onwards and died on 11 July 1787. His will was read the following day and is held at the National Archives at Kew.

== Works ==
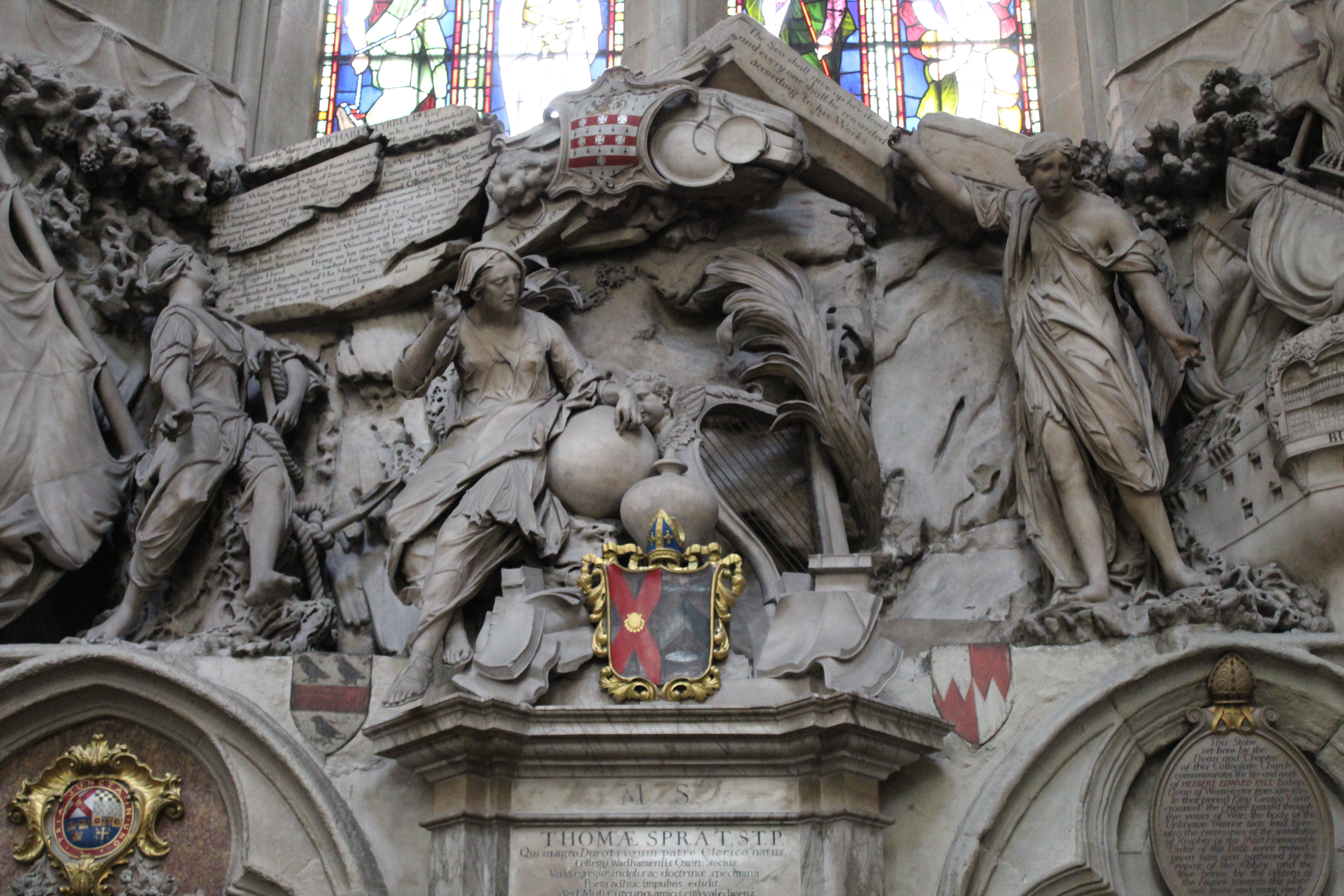
Monument to Richard Tyrell, Westminster Abbey

- The skeleton on Roubiliac's monument to Elizabeth Nightingale in Westminster Abbey (1761)
- Monument to Francis Hooper in the Chapel of Trinity College, Cambridge (1763)
- Medallion of Isaac Newton (1763)
- Monument to James Kendall at West Horsley (c. 1765)
- Monument to Elizabeth and Stephen Niblett at All Souls College, Oxford (1766)
- Huge monument to Admiral Richard Tyrell in Westminster Abbey (1766), the "Pancake Monument"
- Monument to Sir Thomas Morgan, 3rd Baronet at Kinnersley (1767)
- Monument to Mrs Anne Simons at Lechlade (1769)
- Monument to the Duchess of Northumberland in Westminster Abbey (1776) to a design by Robert Adam
- Monument to Rev George Legh in Halifax Parish Church (1776)
- Huge monument to Nicholas Magens at Brightlingsea (1779)
- Monument to James Poole at Great Budworth (1785)
