= HMS Burford (1722) =

Ship of the line of the Royal Navy

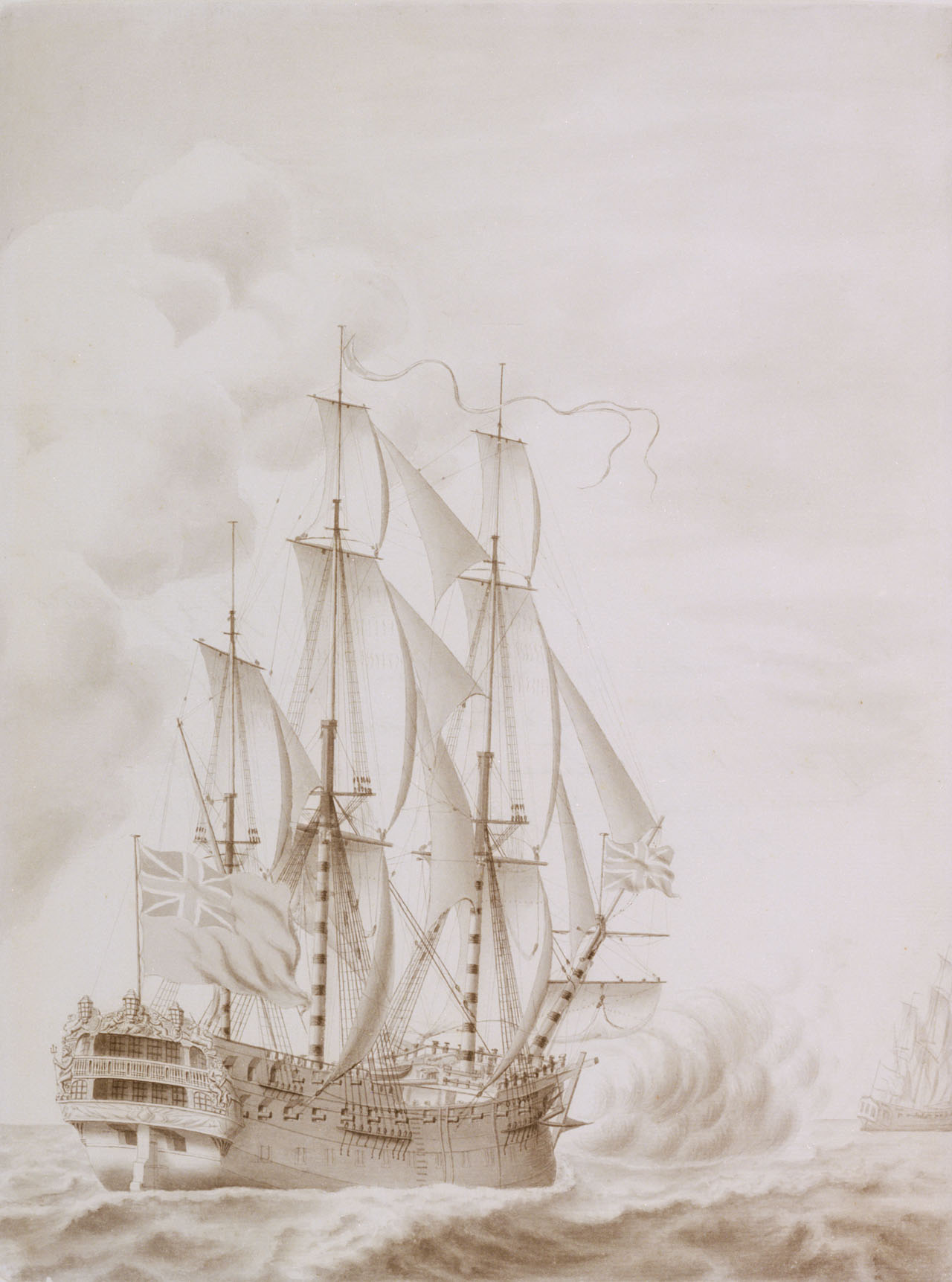
- Burford

History

Great Britain
- Name: HMS Burford
- Ordered: 12 March 1720
- Builder: Richard Stacey, Deptford Dockyard
- Launched: 19 July 1722
- Completed: 7 August 1722
- Commissioned: 1726
- Decommissioned: 1748
- In service: 1722–1752
- Out of service: 1752
- Honours and awards: Puerto Bello 1739
- Fate: Broken up, 1752

General characteristics
- Class & type: 1719 Establishment 70-gun third rate ship of the line
- Tons burthen: 1,14678/94 (bm)
- Length: 151 ft 0 in (46.0 m) (gun deck); 123 ft 2 in (37.5 m) (keel)
- Beam: 41 ft 10 in (12.75 m)
- Depth of hold: 17 ft 4 in (5.28 m)
- Propulsion: Sails
- Sail plan: Full-rigged ship
- Complement: 440
- Armament: 70 guns: Lower Deck: 26 × 24-pdrs; Upper Deck: 26 × 12-pdrs; Quarterdeck: 14 × 6-pdrs; Forecastle: 4 × 6-pdrs

HMS Burford was a 70-gun third rate ship of the line of the Royal Navy, built at Deptford Dockyard to the 1719 Establishment, and launched on 19 July 1722. Burford was notably the early posting of both John Forbes and John Byng, both of whom rose to become admirals.

She was in commission as the flagship of Vice Admiral Edward Hopson during War with Spain in 1727 to 1729 and was repaired in 1737–1738. She served as the flagship of Edward Vernon at the capture of Puerto Bello in 1739 during the War of Jenkins' Ear under the command of Captain Thomas Watson, before returning to Britain for repairs in 1741/42. Her next active duty was in the West Indies from 1742 to 1744 during which she took part in operations at La Guayra and Porto Cabello in 1743 (where she lost two captains in succession) before being stationed in the Mediterranean from 1744 to 1748. After her final decommissioning in 1748, she was broken up in 1752.

== Design and construction ==
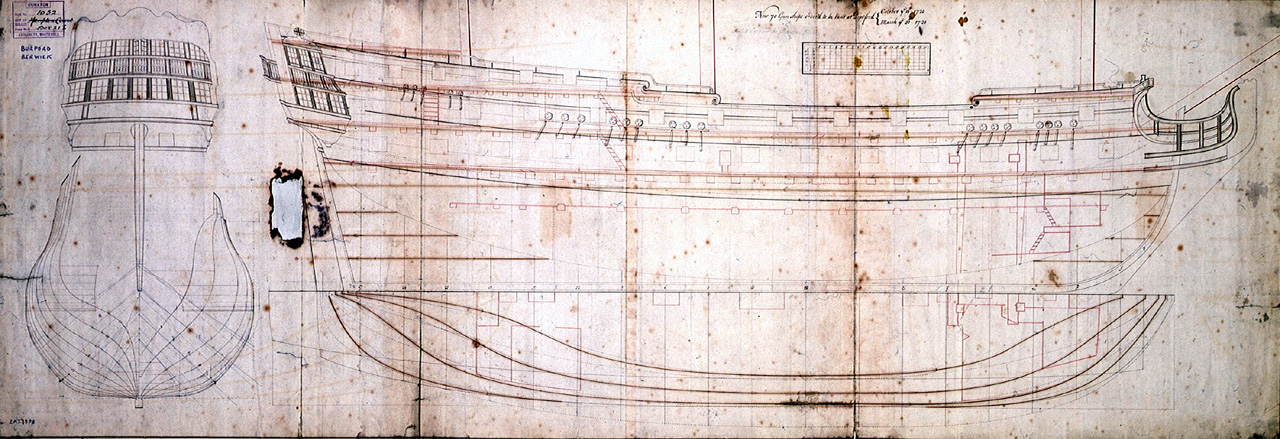
Burford

Burford was one of the four newly built 70-gun third rates of the 1719 Establishment and was ordered on 12 March 1720 to replace the first Burford (1679), which was wrecked on the Italian coast in 1719. She was named for her predecessor and also the Earl of Burford, grandson of King Charles II and Nell Gwynne. Master Shipwright Richard Stacey constructed her at Deptford Dockyard though she was 4 inches broader in the beam and 18 tons burthen bigger than the 1719 Establishment allowed. After being launched on 19 July 1722, she was completed less than a month later on 7 August but not immediately commissioned. Initially she cost £13,463.13.61/2d, including her fitting out.

== Service history ==
Burford's first commanding officer was Captain Charles Stewart, who commissioned her in 1726 as the flagship of Vice Admiral Edward Hopson for service in the Straits of Gibraltar during the winter of 1726 and 1727. On 5 May 1737 she was paid off at Chatham Dockyard for a Middling Repair which lasted from June 1737 to March 1738 and cost £8,298.11.4d. Under Captain Philip Brand she was in home waters before becoming a guard ship at Chatham on 6 December 1738.

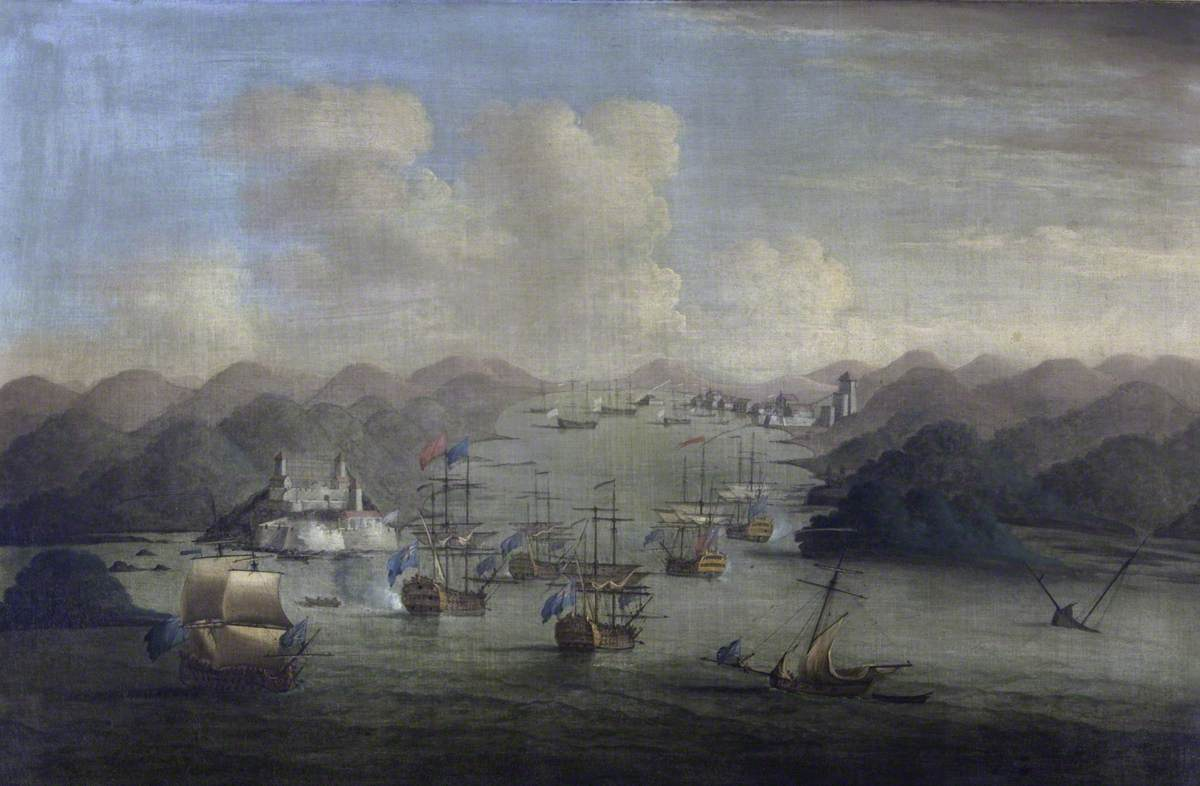
Burford at the Capture of Porto Bello by Admiral Edward Vernon with Only Six Men o' War, 22 November 1739, Peter Monamy

In June 1739, as war with Spain was again looming, she was fitted as the flagship of Vice Admiral Edward Vernon for the Caribbean under Commander (promoted captain in October 1739) Thomas Watson. She sailed on 23 July 1739 for Finisterre and on to the West Indies, fighting at the capture of Puerto Bello on 21 November 1739. Captain Thomas Griffin commanded her in 1740 and she was part of the Cartagena operations from 9 March to 7 May 1740. In November 1741 she was back in Chatham Dockyard to commence a Great Repair finishing in September 1742 and costing £17,747.10.11d.

After this repair she was sent back to the West Indies under Captain Edward Lushington and participated in the attack on La Guayra on 18 February 1743 in the squadron commanded by Captain Charles Knowles of HMS Suffolk. In this action Lushington was mortally wounded, 24 men were killed and 49 wounded – her captain died on 22 February. Her next engagement was in same squadron during the disastrous attack on Porto Cabello on 16 and 24 April 1743 under her new captain, Edward Smith, who died on 18 April and was replaced by Captain Richard Watkins. By August 1744 she was in the Mediterranean under Captain John Bentley. She returned home from the Mediterranean in 1748 to pay off for the last time.

== Fate ==
Burford was surveyed on 18 September 1752 and broken up at Chatham docked by Admiralty Order on 27 September 1752, a process completed by October of the same year.

== Battle honour ==
The second Burford won a single battle honour: Puerto Bello 1739.
