= John Benbow =

Royal Navy officer (1653–1702)

Vice-Admiral of the White John Benbow
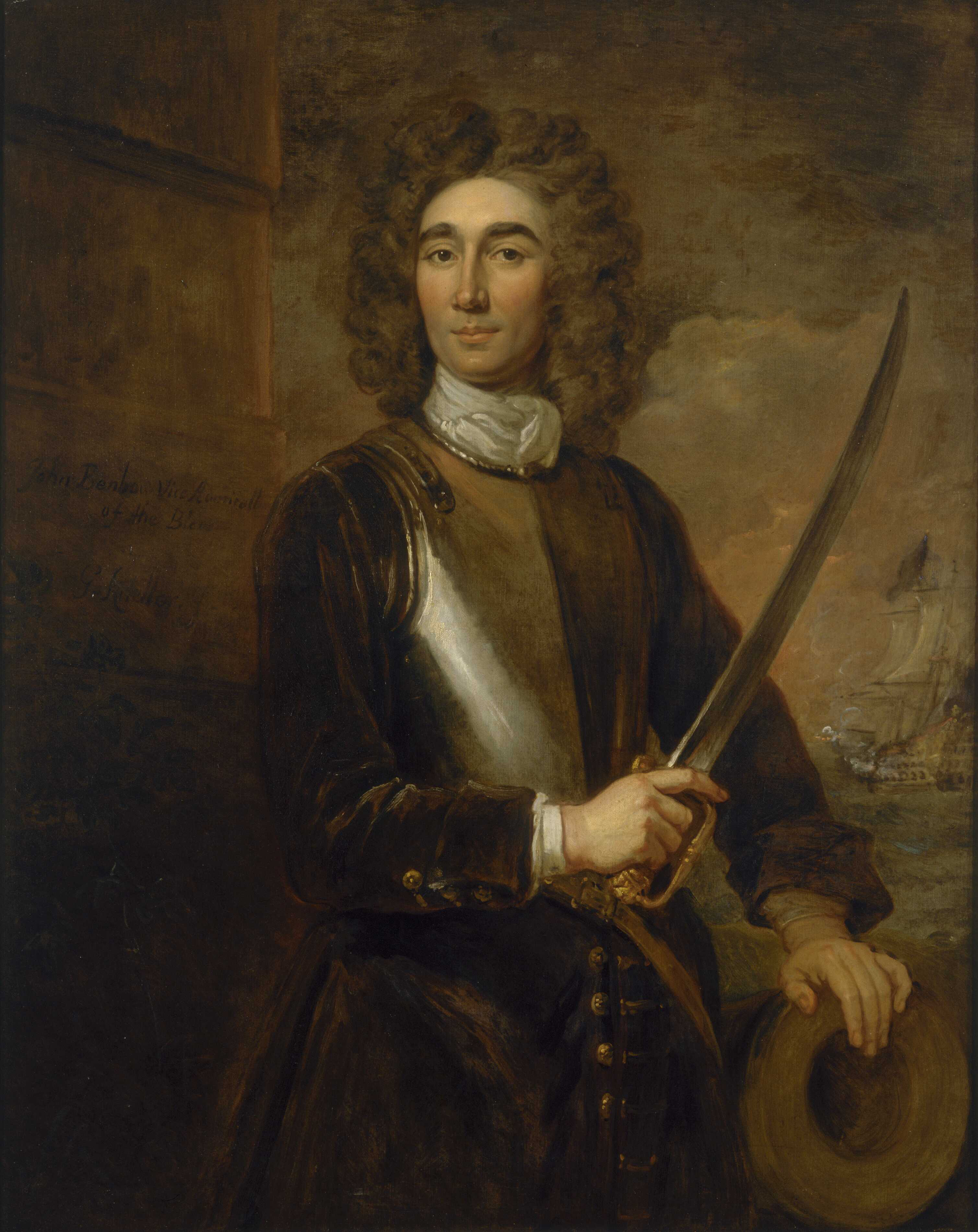
- Portrait by Sir Godfrey Kneller, 1701
- Born: 10 March 1653; Shrewsbury, England
- Died: 4 November 1702 (aged 49); Port Royal, Jamaica
- Military career
- Allegiance: England
- Branch: Royal Navy
- Service years: 1678–1702
- Rank: Vice-Admiral of the White
- Nicknames: "Brave Benbow", "A Brother Tar"
- Commands: HMS York; HMS Bonaventure; HMS Britannia; HMS Royal Sovereign; HMS Norwich; HMS Northumberland; HMS Charles Galley; HMS Suffolk; HMS Duke; HMS Gloucester; HMS Breda; Jamaica Station
- Conflicts: Nine Years' War; Battle of Beachy Head (1690); Battles of Barfleur and La Hogue; War of the Spanish Succession; Action of August 1702 (DOW)

Vice-Admiral of the White John Benbow (10 March 1653 – 4 November 1702) was a Royal Navy officer. He joined the Navy in 1678, seeing action against Barbary pirates before leaving to join the Merchant Navy in which Benbow served until the 1688 Glorious Revolution, whereupon he returned to the Royal Navy and was commissioned.

Benbow fought against the French Navy during the Nine Years' War, serving on and later commanding several English warships and taking part in the battles of Beachy Head in 1690 and Barfleur and La Hogue in 1692. He went on to achieve fame during his military accomplishments, which included fighting against Barbary pirates such as the Salé Rovers, besieging Saint-Malo and seeing action in the West Indies against the French during the War of the Spanish Succession.

Benbow's fame and success earned him a promotion to the rank of Vice-Admiral of the White. He subsequently fought at the action of August 1702, in which a number of his captains refused to support him in attacking the French. Benbow instigated the court-martial and subsequent imprisonment or execution of a number of the captains involved, though he did not live to see these results, dying of wounds sustained in battle. These events contributed to his notoriety, and led to several references to him in popular culture.

== Family and early years ==
Benbow was born the son of William and Martha Benbow. The astrologer John Partridge recorded the exact time and date of his birth as being at noon on 10 March 1653, and this is the date used by the National Museum of the Royal Navy, the Encyclopædia Britannica, and the local historical accounts of Joseph Nightingale published in 1818. A biography within an 1819 publication of The Gentleman's Magazine, however, records in a short biography entitled Life and Exploits of Admiral Benbow by D. Parkes that he was born in 1650, as does the 1861 Sea kings and naval heroes by John George Edgar. Edgar records that Benbow's father died when Benbow was very young, while Parkes' account describes his father as being in the service of the Army under Charles I and not dying until Benbow was in his teens. Encyclopædia Britannica writes that Benbow's father was in fact a tanner. Meanwhile, his uncle, Thomas, was executed by Charles I. Both Parkes and the National Museum of the Royal Navy concur that Benbow was born in Coton Hill in Shrewsbury, Shropshire, and Nightingale asserts that the death of both uncle and father, and the family's association with Charles I in the years following his execution, ensured that the "family were brought very low". The young Benbow was employed at this time as apprentice to either a waterman or a butcher. However his lack of income or possessions, Nightingale writes, turned him to a career at sea.

== Naval career ==
=== Early years ===
Benbow entered the Royal Navy on 30 April 1678, aged 25 years. He became master's mate aboard the 64-gun HMS Rupert under the command of Captain Arthur Herbert, while she was fitting out at Portsmouth. He sailed with her to the Mediterranean, where Herbert was promoted to the rank of vice-admiral while serving under the commander-in-chief in the Mediterranean, Admiral Sir John Narborough. During this period the English fleet was often in action against the Barbary pirates of North Africa that were actively preying upon European shipping. In 1678, Rupert herself captured a warship of the Regency of Algiers, which was later commissioned into the Royal Navy as HMS Tiger Prize. Benbow distinguished himself well in a number of actions against the Algerine vessels, and won Herbert's approval. On Narborough's return to England, Herbert was appointed acting commander-in-chief, and made Benbow master aboard HMS Nonsuch on 15 June 1679. Nonsuch would remain at Tangiers and off the African coast and had a number of successive captains who would go on to achieve flag rank, including George Rooke, Cloudesley Shovell and Francis Wheler. All were impressed by Benbow, and would afterwards help to advance his career.

Nonsuch was next in action on 8 August 1681, this time against the Algerine warship Golden Horse. Golden Horse had been engaged by HMS Adventure, under the command of Captain William Booth, and when Nonsuch arrived on the scene Golden Horse surrendered. A dispute then arose over the question of the prize money and how it should be shared out, and comments were made amongst Nonsuch's crew against those of Adventure. Benbow's repetition of these eventually came to Booth's knowledge, and the captain brought a court-martial against Benbow; however, this revealed that Benbow had only been repeating these words rather than being their originator. Benbow was ordered to forfeit three months' pay, amounting to £12 15s., to Adventure's crew, and to "ask Captain Booth's pardon on board His Majesty's ship Bristol, declaring that he had no malicious intent in speaking those words; all the commanders being present, and a boat's crew of each ship's company".

=== Merchant trading ===
Nonsuch then returned to England and was paid off on 9 November 1681. Benbow left the Royal Navy and entered the merchant service, sailing a merchant vessel from London and Bristol to ports in Italy and Spain. By 1686 he was a "tough merchant seaman" and the owner and commander of a frigate named Benbow, trading with the Levant. In May 1687 he commanded a merchant vessel, Malaga Merchant, and was aboard her when she was attacked by the Salé Rovers. He mounted a successful defence and beat off the attack. It was claimed afterwards that he cut off and salted the heads of thirteen North African pirates who were slain aboard his ship, and then took them into Cádiz to claim a reward from the city's magistrates. A North African kufi, "coated with varnish and set in silver" and bearing the inscription "First adventure of Captain John Benbow, and gift to Richard Ridley, 1687" is referred to in 1844 by Charles Dickens in Bentley's Miscellany where he speaks of Shrewsbury's history, and the 1885 Dictionary of National Biography also relates the story.

=== Return to the Navy ===
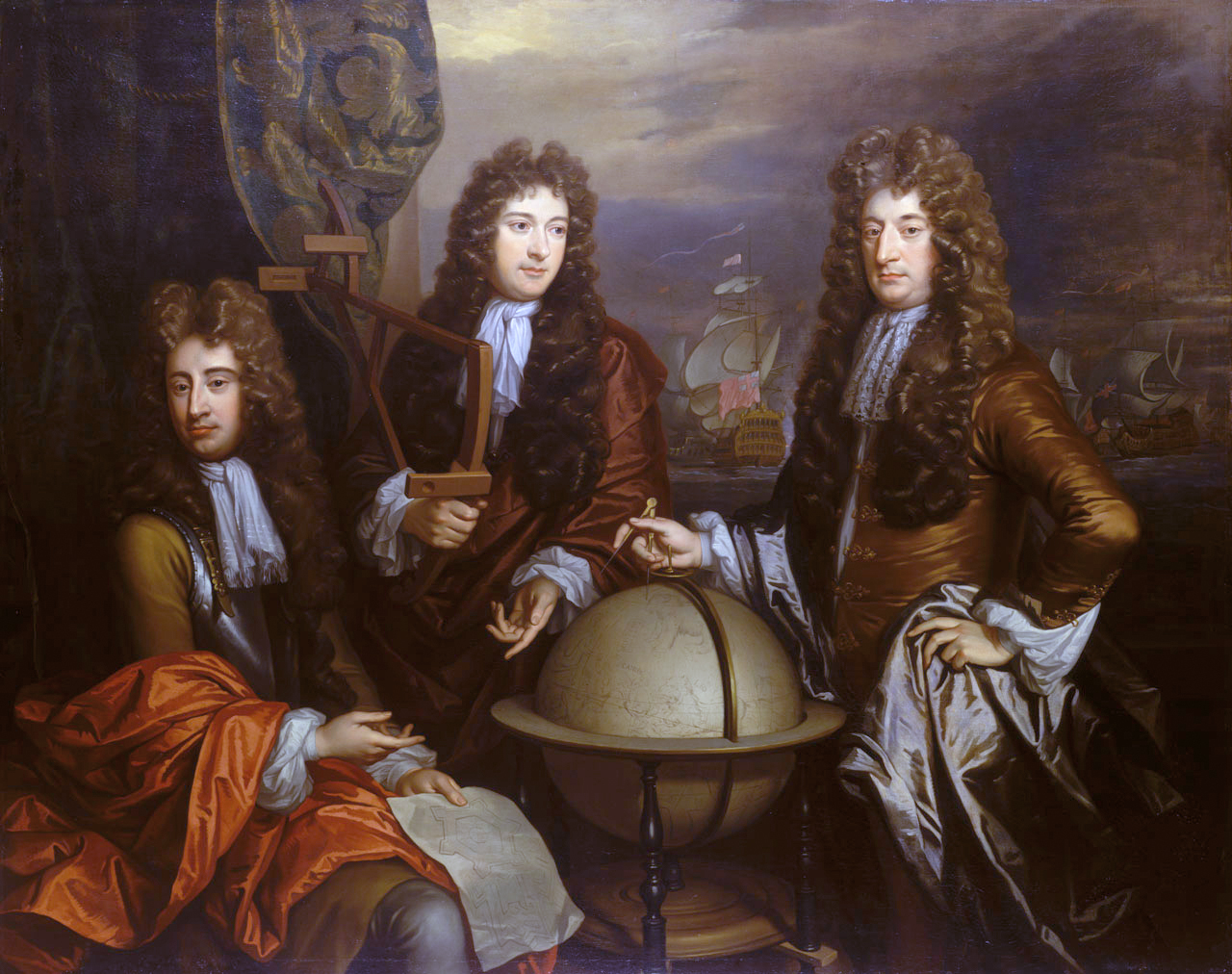
Thomas Murray's triple portrait of Thomas Phillips (left), John Benbow (centre) and Sir Ralph Delaval (right). The three had been important figures in British fleet operations against the north coast of France during 1692–93.

Benbow only returned to the Royal Navy after the Glorious Revolution in 1688. His first recorded commission was to the post of third lieutenant of HMS Elizabeth on 1 June 1689, under the command of Captain David Mitchell. His first command came on 20 September of that year, when he was appointed captain of HMS York. He was transferred to HMS Bonaventure on 26 October and then to HMS Britannia on 12 November.

Benbow's next post was as Master Attendant of Chatham Dockyard. He then moved to become Master Attendant at Deptford Dockyard in early March 1690, a post he intermittently held for the next six years. He was master of HMS Royal Sovereign in summer 1690, under his old commander Arthur Herbert, now Lord Torrington. He was assigned to act as master of the fleet, and took part in the English defeat in the Battle of Beachy Head. After the defeat, a Royal Commission was held into the circumstances that led to it. Benbow was highly regarded as a specialist in both navigation and pilotage, and his evidence given in July 1690 to the preliminary investigation strongly favoured his old patron, Torrington. He did not, however, testify during Torrington's court-martial in December that year.

Benbow continued aboard Sovereign throughout 1691, and by the summer of 1692, was again master of the fleet, this time under Admiral Edward Russell, then aboard Britannia. Benbow worked closely with his old colleague David Mitchell, then serving as Russell's first captain, and Josiah Burchett, Russell's clerk. Benbow may have advised Russell to take the Gull Passage inside the Goodwin Sands to the Downs, where they linked up with the Dutch forces. Benbow served as master of the fleet during the Battles of Barfleur and La Hogue. After the battles, Benbow returned to Deptford to resume his duties as master attendant, spending a brief period at Portsmouth Dockyard helping to oversee repairs to the fleet. He had already had his pay upgraded to that of a master attendant, he was now to be paid as a master, in addition to his master attendant's wage, presumably as an acknowledgement of his special services.

=== With the bomb flotillas ===
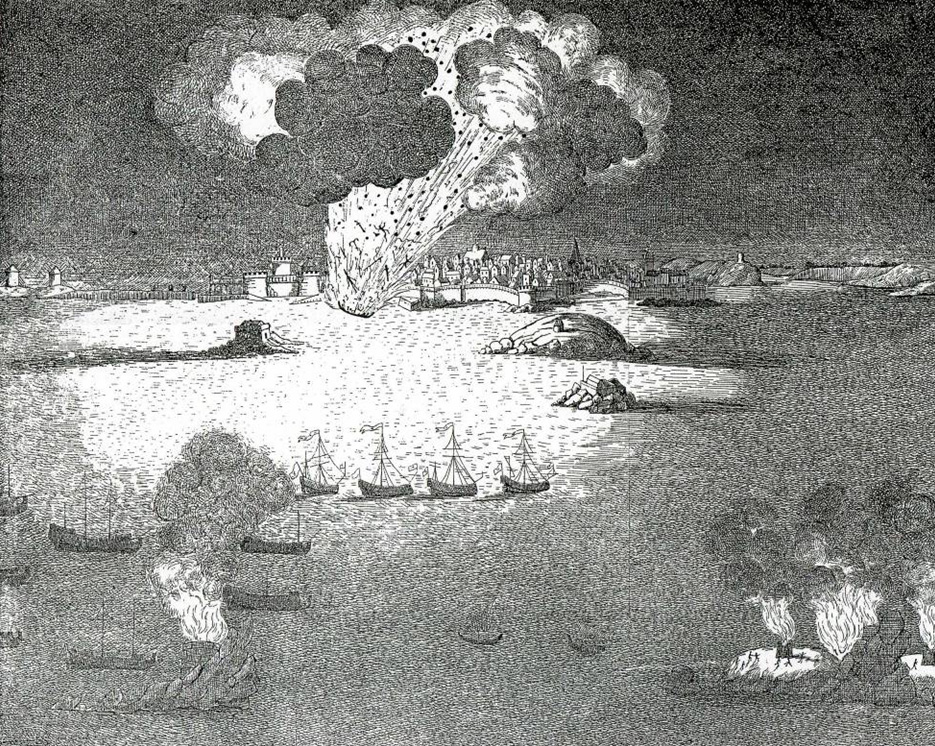
Benbow's attack on Saint-Malo, where he blew up the machine ship Vesuvius, 1693

Benbow returned to active naval service in September 1693, joining Thomas Phillips, the second engineer of the ordnance, in jointly commanding a flotilla of bomb vessels to attack Saint-Malo. Benbow went aboard the 48-gun HMS Norwich and began the bombardment on 26 November. It continued intermittently until 19 November when a large fireship was sent into the harbour. An attempt was made to bring her alongside the town walls, but she ran aground, was set on fire, and exploded. Despite the failure of the initial plan, considerable damage was done, and Benbow's forces were able to take the fort on Quince Rock and disable it, carrying artillery and prisoners away and bringing them to Guernsey. Benbow was still dissatisfied with the overall result and initiated a court-martial against Captain Henry Tourville, accusing him of cowardice for not bringing his ship in closer. There was no conviction though, as the mortars were proved to be defective.

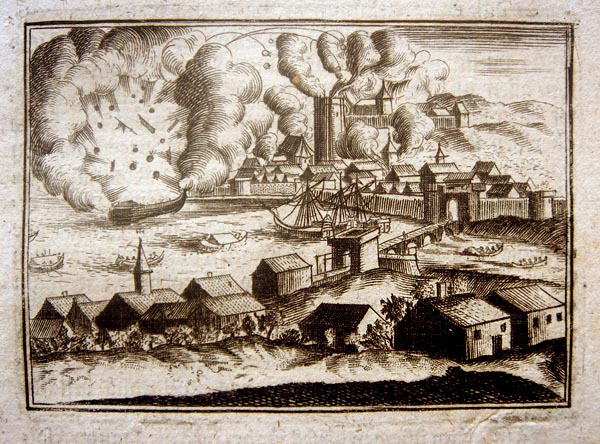
Benbow's bombardment of Dieppe in July 1694

Benbow's experience led to him being promoted to a similar flotilla, this time to be deployed against Dunkirk under the command of Vice-Admiral Shovell. A number of converted merchant vessels, rigged like fireships but designed to explode rather than burn, were assigned to support the expedition. Benbow had a hand in preparing these vessels for the operation throughout 1694, and worked closely with the principal storekeeper of the ordnance, Willem Meesters. Benbow's attacking fleet was covered by Shovell's fleet on the Downs and the attack was planned for 12 and 13 September. However, the French were able to block the entrance to the port, preventing Benbow's squadron from entering, and a storm further disrupted operations. Benbow drew back from Dunkirk, and instead sailed around to Calais, where he carried out a further bombardment on 27 September. He returned to the Downs and then resumed his duties at Deptford Dockyard. He spent December organising a convoy for a fleet of merchant vessels due to sail to Cádiz.

=== Rise to admiral ===
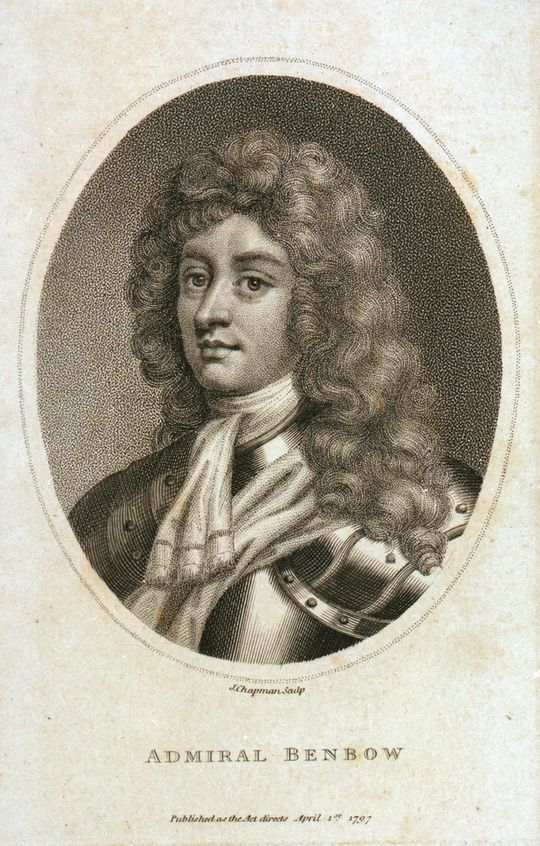
Benbow as an admiral, engraved by John Chapman and published in 1797

Benbow was soon at sea again in March 1695, being appointed commander-in-chief of His Majesty's ships which were then off the coast of France. His squadron was highly successful, taking a number of French merchants in early April and bringing them to England as prizes. Benbow was recommended by Lord Berkeley, who had served with Benbow at Saint-Malo, to be promoted to rear-admiral at the next opportunity, and in the meantime he was appointed to the command of the 70-gun HMS Northumberland. He was soon joined by a volunteer – his then fourteen-year-old son – also named John Benbow. Benbow then sailed with Berkeley and the Dutch lieutenant-admiral Philips van Almonde to Saint-Malo, intending to operate against privateering operations being conducted from the area. Benbow moved to command HMS Charles Galley, to direct the inshore operations of ten English and Dutch warships, nine English bomb vessels, and seventeen small boats and vessels. They began operations on their arrival off Saint-Malo on 4 July, remaining in action until evening the next day when they withdrew, without having achieved any decisive result. Several houses had been destroyed for the damage and loss of a few of the bomb vessels. Benbow was given eight bomb vessels and seven or eight frigates and was dispatched down the coast. He attacked Granville on 8 July, shelling it with over 900 bombs over several hours, and departed having set the town ablaze.

=== Public and private reception ===
The outcome of the operations had left Benbow in a tense relationship with his immediate superiors. Berkeley had been accused of excessive timidity in his actions, which it was believed had led to the failure of the attack on Dunkirk. Benbow on the other hand was widely lauded for his fearless inshore attacks with his bomb vessels. Berkeley wrote on 28 July:

As to Captain Benbow, I know of no difference between him and me, nor have we had any. He has no small obligation to me, but being called in some of the foolish printed papers ‘the famous Captain Benbow’, I suppose has put him a little out of himself, and has made him play the fool, as I guess, in some of his letters. I will not farther now particularize this business, but time will show I have not been in the wrong, unless being too kind to an ungrateful man.

However, the Admiralty approved of Benbow's conduct and ordered him "to be paid as Rear-Admiral during the time he has been employed this summer on the coast of France ... as a reward for his good service." Benbow was then appointed to the grand committee of sixty men to oversee the plans for Greenwich Hospital in December 1695, but the issue dragged on until 1 May 1696. The Admiralty again stepped in, and Benbow was finally promoted and appointed commander-in-chief of the squadron before Dunkirk as "Rear-Admiral of the Blue for the duration of this present expedition" and moved aboard the 70-gun HMS Suffolk. His orders were to protect English and Dutch shipping, especially from the squadron of the privateer Jean Bart. Bart, however, was mostly successful in evading pursuit, usually escaping into Dunkirk when Benbow's force drew near.

Benbow was appointed to command a squadron in the Soundings in December 1696. He carried out a number of cruises between March and August 1697, protecting allied trade and escorting the West Indian and Virginian merchant fleets into port. These activities marked the last English naval expedition of the war. He also carried out reconnaissance activities on the French fleet in port in Brest in July, before resuming patrol operations off Dunkirk, this time in concert with a number of Dutch ships under Rear-Admiral Philips van der Goes, until the end of the war in September 1697.

=== Appointment to the West Indies ===
Benbow was made commander-in-chief of the King's ships in the West Indies on 9 March 1698, and instructed to tackle the issue of piracy. He sailed in November, the first leg taking him from Portsmouth to Madeira. Sailing under his protection from the Salé Rovers was Paramore, under Edmond Halley, then sailing to the North Atlantic to carry out experiments to observe magnetic variations. Benbow finally reached Barbados in February 1699, and moved to the Spanish Main aboard his flagship, the 60-gun HMS Gloucester. He threatened the governor of Cartagena with a blockade, and so compelled him to restore two English merchant ships that he had detained. These ships had been intended to take part in an expedition against the Scottish Darién scheme. Without the ships, this became impossible and the colonists were saved for the time being. This was counter to the English government's desire to see the end of the Scottish colonising efforts, and in June Benbow and the other West Indies governors received orders "not to assist the Scotch colony in Darien".

Benbow then sailed as far north as Newfoundland in order to drive the pirates away, but they evaded capture. Benbow returned to England in the summer of 1700, and was appointed to the command of a fleet in the Downs. Benbow served there until summer 1701, under the command of Admiral Sir George Rooke. He was promoted to rear-admiral of the red on 14 April, followed by vice-admiral of the blue on 30 June. He then flew his flag in the 70-gun HMS Breda.

=== Spanish treasure fleet, West Indies, the action of 1702 ===
With the peace becoming increasingly uneasy, the English government became concerned over the possible fate of the Spanish silver fleet, due to arrive in European waters from America. They were worried that the French would intercept the ships and use the treasure for war preparations. Benbow was issued secret instructions to find the fleet, and then "to seize and bring them to England, taking care that no embezzlement be made". Benbow's squadron was detached on 2 September and sailed for the West Indies, arriving on 14 November, and was at the Jamaica Station in mid-December. He remained there for several months, being joined on 8 May 1702 by several vessels under Captain William Whetstone. Whetstone was made Rear-Admiral under Benbow, who had been promoted to Vice-Admiral of the White on 19 January 1702

By now, the War of the Spanish Succession had broken out, and news of its declaration reached Benbow on 7 July. He detached Whetstone and six ships to search off Port St Louis in Hispaniola for a French squadron under Admiral Jean du Casse, which he believed would call at the port on his voyage to Cartagena, and from there he might raid English and Dutch shipping. After Whetstone had left, Benbow took his squadron and sailed for Cartagena, anticipating that either he or Whetstone would find Du Casse and bring him to battle.

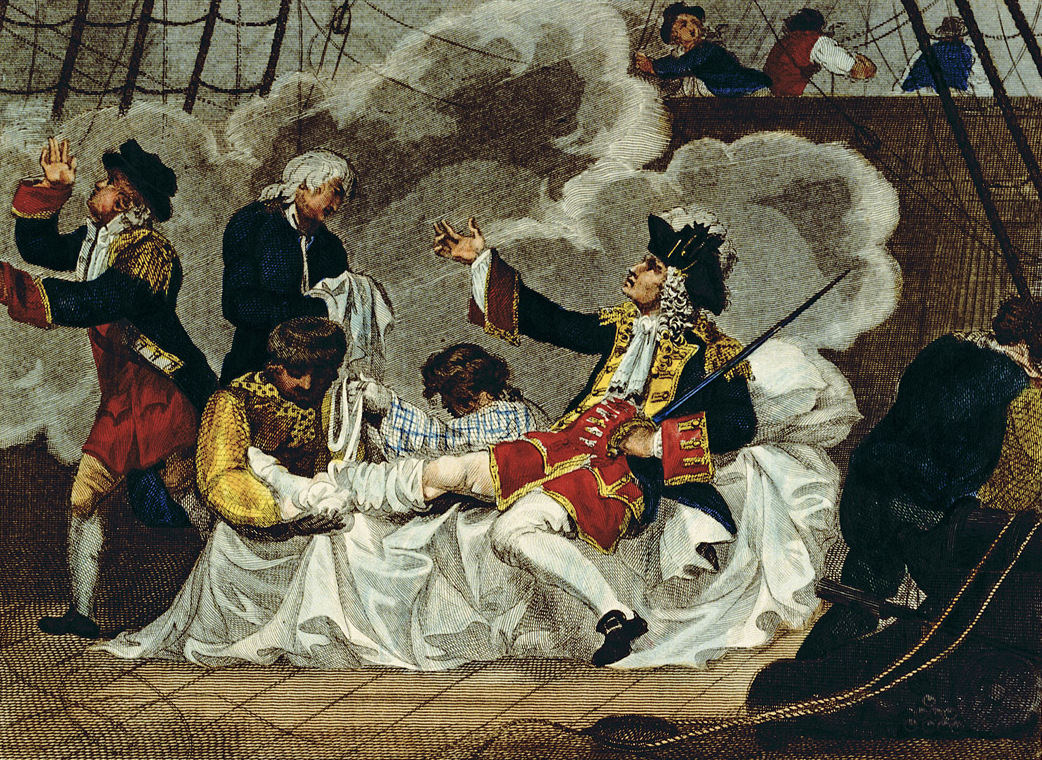
The legend of 'Brave Benbow', "Adml Benbow courageously commanding his Men to fight after his Leg was shattered to Pieces, St Martha (West Indies) 19–24 July 1702."

By the time that Whetstone had reached Hispaniola, Du Casse had already departed. Benbow's force subsequently sighted the French on 19 August, sailing off Cape Santa Marta. The French had three transports and four warships carrying between 68 and 70 guns, while Benbow commanded seven ships carrying between 50 and 70 guns. The English forces were heavily scattered, and the light winds meant that they were slow to regroup. They did not achieve a form of collective order until four in the afternoon, after which a partial engagement was fought, lasting about two hours, until nightfall caused the fleets to temporarily break off.

The action quickly revealed a breakdown in discipline amongst Benbow's captains. He had intended that the 64-gun HMS Defiance under Captain Richard Kirkby would lead the line of battle, but Kirkby was not maintaining his station. Benbow decided to take the lead himself, and Breda pulled ahead, followed by the 50-gun HMS Ruby under Captain George Walton. The two maintained contact with the French throughout the night, but the other five ships refused to close. The chase ensued until 24 August, with only Benbow, Walton, and Samuel Vincent aboard HMS Falmouth making active efforts to bring the French to battle. At times, they bore the brunt of the fire of the entire squadron. Ruby was disabled on 23 August, and Benbow ordered her to retire to Port Royal. The French resumed the action at two in the morning on 24 August, the entire squadron closing on Breda from astern and pounding her. Benbow himself was hit by a chain-shot that broke his leg and he was carried below.

Benbow was determined to continue the pursuit, despite his wounds and despite Captain Kirkby's arrival on board, attempting to persuade Benbow to abandon the pursuit. Benbow summoned a council of war, and the other captains agreed, signing a paper drafted by Kirkby which declared that they believed "that after six days of battle the squadron lacked enough men to continue and that there was little chance of a decisive action, since the men were exhausted, there was a general lack of ammunition, the ships' rigging and masts were badly damaged, and the winds were generally variable and undependable." They recommended breaking off the action and following the French to see if the situation improved. Benbow had "seen the cowardly behaviour of some of them before, [and] had reason to believe that they either had a design against him or to be traitors to their country if an opportunity happened that the French could have destroyed the Admiral". He, therefore, ordered the squadron to return to Jamaica. On their arrival, he ordered the captains to be imprisoned, awaiting a trial by court-martial.

Benbow received a letter from du Casse after the engagement:

Sir,
I had little hopes on Monday last but to have supped in your cabin: but it pleased God to order it otherwise. I am thankful for it. As for those cowardly captains who deserted you, hang them up, for by God they deserve it.
Yours,
Du Casse.

=== Trial of the captains ===
Acting Rear-Admiral Whetstone returned to Port Royal, having spent 62 days cruising off Hispaniola, and preparations were made for the trial. Before it could begin, Captain Thomas Hudson died, who had commanded HMS Pendennis. The remaining captains appeared at the court-martial which convened on Breda, held between 19 and 23 October. Due to his injuries, Benbow passed to Whetstone the role of presiding over the court, but he was present at the trial. The court found Captain Kirkby of Defiance and Cooper Wade of Greenwich guilty of breach of orders, neglect of duty, and the "ill signed paper and consultation ... which obliged the Admiral ... to give over the chase and fight", and condemned them to be shot.

John Constable of HMS Windsor was found guilty of breach of orders and drunkenness and was cashiered. Samuel Vincent of Falmouth and Christopher Fogg of Breda were initially sentenced to be cashiered for signing the six captains' resolution, but Benbow personally declared that they had fought bravely, and their sentences were remitted by the Lord High Admiral. The sentences were deferred so that Queen Anne could have a chance to examine the proceedings. After her consideration in January 1703, she allowed the sentences to proceed and Constable, Kirkby, and Wade were returned to England as prisoners. Constable was imprisoned until 1704, when the Queen pardoned him. Kirkby and Wade were shot aboard HMS Bristol on 16 April 1703 while she was anchored in Plymouth Sound under Captain Edward Acton. Controversy slowly began to develop over the events of August 1702. Supporters of the disgraced Kirkby and Wade sought to discredit Benbow by publishing their own account of the action.

== Death and burial ==
Benbow died at Port Royal, Kingston, Jamaica on 4 November 1702. Whetstone reported that the cause of death was "the wound of his leg which he received in battle with Monsieur Du Casse, it never being set to perfection, which malady being aggravated by the discontent of his mind, threw him into a sort of melancholy which ended his life as before." He was buried on 16 November in the chancel of St Andrew's Church, Kingston. A marble slab was later laid over the grave, emblazoned with a coat of arms and inscribed:

Here lyeth the Body of John Benbow, Esq., Admiral of the White, a true pattern of English Courage, who lost his life in Defence of his Queene & Country, November the 4th, 1702, In the 52nd year of his age, by a wound in his Legg. Received in an Engagement with Monsr. Du Casse; being Much Lamented.

Secretary of State Lord Nottingham wrote to Benbow in January 1703, before news of his death had reached London, to inform him that the queen was "extremely well pleased with your conduct and much offended with the baseness of those officers who deserted and betrayed you." Meanwhile, the cabinet was preparing to promote him to vice-admiral of the white and to dispatch him to transport troops to Newfoundland.

== Personal life and legacy ==
Benbow returned to England in 1681, and on 26 June 1682, at Holy Trinity, Minories, in the City of London, he married a widow named Elizabeth More. The couple had at least seven children, including daughter Martha and sons John and Richard. Another son, Solomon, was baptised in 1686 but died in infancy. Martha died in 1722. There are also records of two more sons named Richard who were born in Kent, and another daughter named Katherine. Son John went on to serve in the Royal Navy. The family lived in the parish of St Dunstan and All Saints, Stepney. In 1709, Katherine married Paul Calton of Milton, Berkshire, where Benbow is said to have stayed in the 1690s. According to Parish Records William Benbow son of Admiral John Benbow was buried at St Nicholas Parish Church, Deptford, Kent (now SE London) on 7 April 1729. One of the admiral's granddaughters married the Rev. John Simpson, who commissioned the current Stoke Hall, Derbyshire, following his acquisition of the estate upon their marriage.

=== Benbow and Peter the Great ===
Benbow signed a three-year lease on Sayes Court in June 1696, a house belonging to diarist John Evelyn. Six months later, Evelyn wrote to a friend complaining, "I have let my house to Captain Benbow, and have the mortification of seeing everyday much of my former labours and expenses there impairing for want of a more polite tenant." In January 1698, Tsar Peter of Russia arrived in London to study British shipbuilding and seamanship. He and his entourage were provided with Sayes Court to reside in during their stay by William III. The Russians spent three months in London before leaving to tour the country. Benbow promptly asked for reparations from the Treasury, in order to be able to reimburse Evelyn and recover his own losses. He complained that the Russians had caused considerable damage to his house, with "much of the furniture broke, lost or destroyed". Christopher Wren was instructed to survey the property and declared it "entirely ruined". Benbow lost "twenty fine paintings" and "several fine draughts and other designs relating to the Sea" from his personal property. The Treasury eventually allowed payment of £350 9s. 6d. in compensation.

=== "Brave Benbow" ===
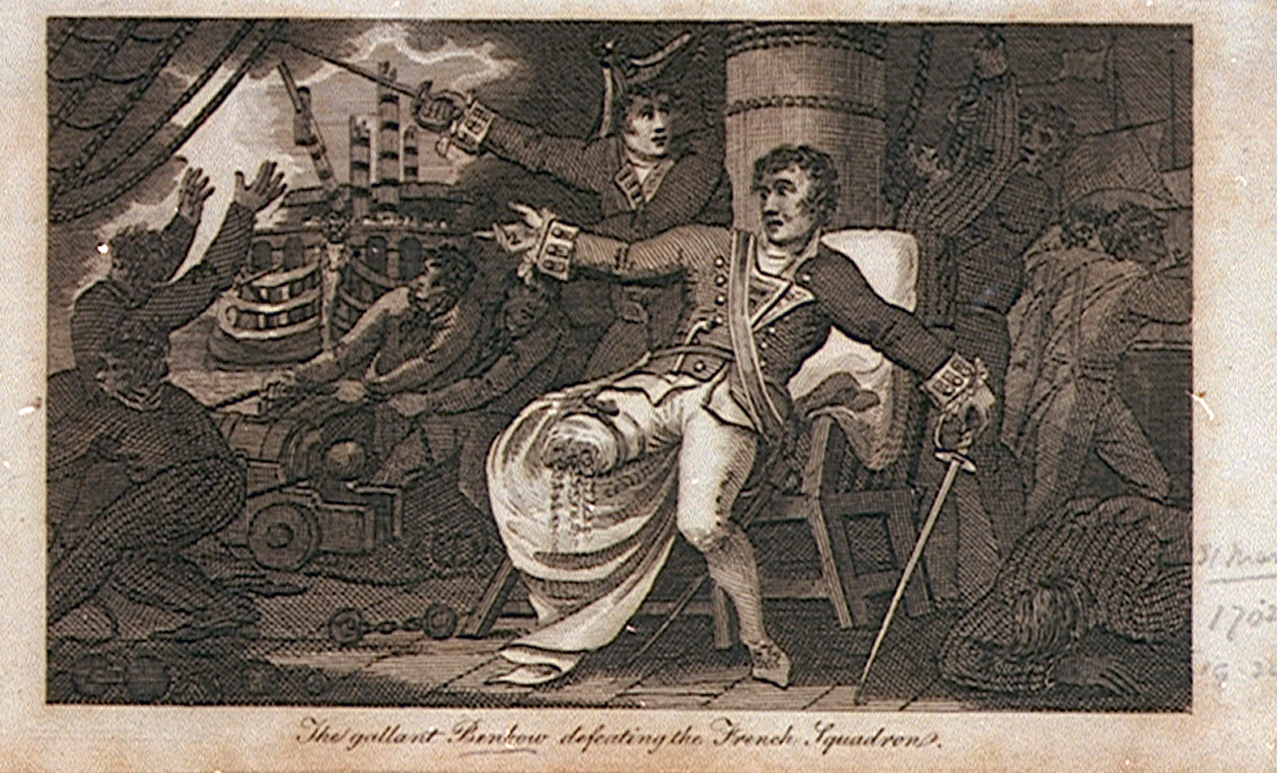
An engraving produced in 1804 that helped to promote the legend.

Benbow's fame led to his name entering popular culture. A monument by sculptor John Evan Thomas was erected in 1843 by public subscription in St Mary's Church, Shrewsbury commemorating Benbow as "a skillful and daring seaman whose heroic exploits long rendered him the boast of the British Navy and still point him out as the Nelson of his times." A 74-gun ship of the line and two battleships were named HMS Benbow.

There are a number of real life Admiral Benbow public houses around the world, and other institutions that have borne his name. Whether they are named as a result of Robert Louis Stevenson's use of "The Admiral Benbow Inn" in his novel Treasure Island, or if they are named for the Admiral himself, it is impossible to say. It is alleged that Stevenson named the Hawkins' Inn after the arrest of several members of the "Benbow Brandy Men" smuggling gang that frequented the Benbow pub in Penzance shortly before he visited in August 1877.

=== "Admiral John Benbow" (song) ===
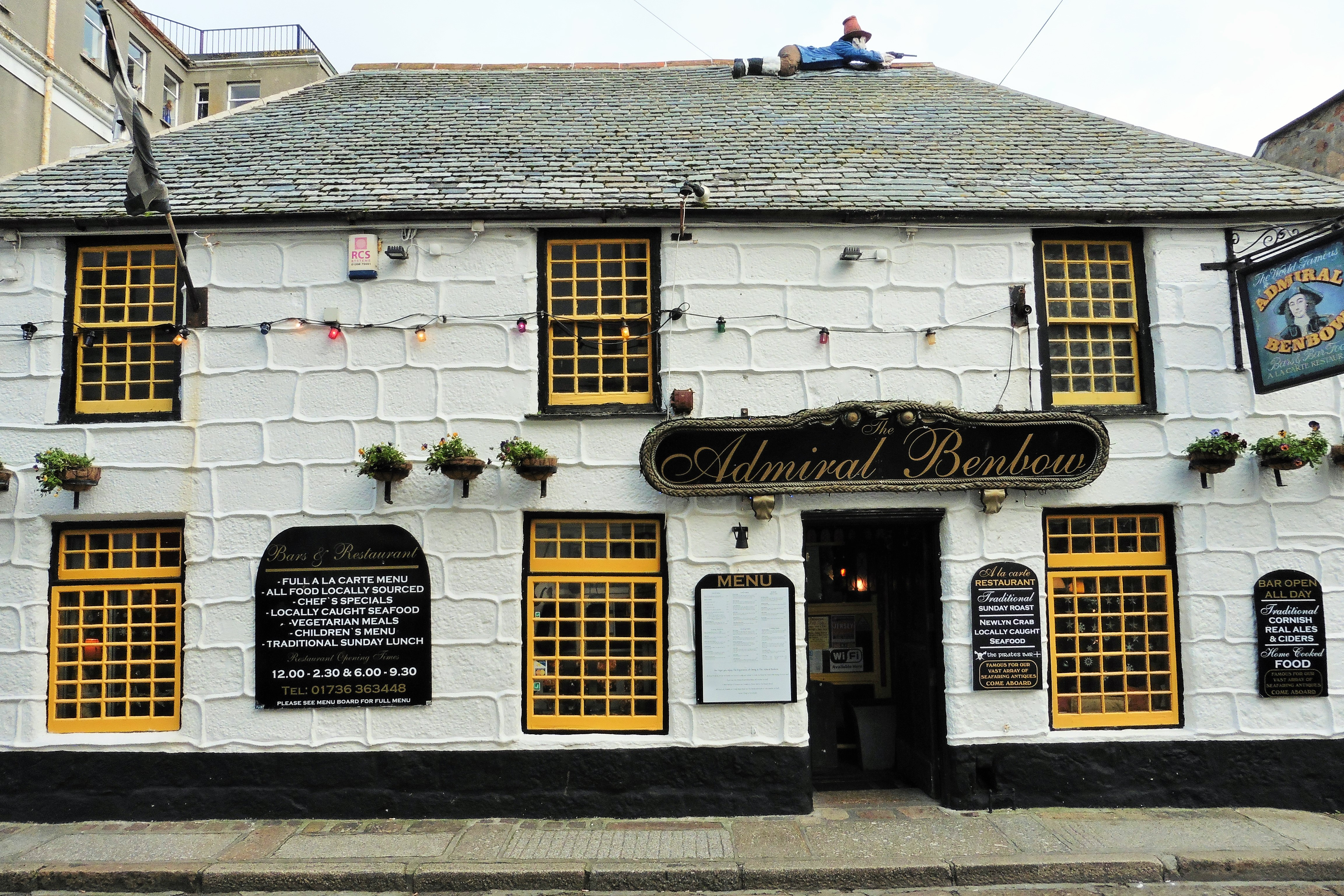
The Admiral Benbow in Penzance, reportedly an inspiration for Stevenson's Inn

The incident of August 1702 also took hold on the popular imagination, and was celebrated in an alehouse song, listed as number 227 in the Roud Folk Song Index:

Come all you seamen bold
and draw near, and draw near,
Come all you seamen bold and draw near.
It's of an Admiral's fame,
O brave Benbow was his name,
How he fought all on the main,
you shall hear, you shall hear.

Brave Benbow he set sail
For to fight, for to fight
Brave Benbow he set sail for to fight.
Brave Benbow he set sail
with a fine and pleasant gale
But his captains they turn'd tail
in a fright, in a fright.

Says Kirby unto Wade:
We will run, we will run
Says Kirby unto Wade, we will run.
For I value no disgrace,
nor the losing of my place,
But the enemy I won't face,
nor his guns, nor his guns.

The Ruby and Benbow
fought the French, fought the French
The Ruby and Benbow fought the French.
They fought them up and down,
till the blood came trickling down,
Till the blood came trickling down
where they lay, where they lay.

Brave Benbow lost his legs
by chain shot, by chain shot
Brave Benbow lost his legs by chain shot.
Brave Benbow lost his legs,
And all on his stumps he begs,
Fight on my English lads,
'Tis our lot, 'tis our lot.

The surgeon dress'd his wounds,
Cries Benbow, cries Benbow
The surgeon dress'd his wounds, cries Benbow.
Let a cradle now in haste,
on the quarterdeck be placed
That the enemy I may face
'Til I die, 'Til I die.

Its musical theme forms one of the three arrangements on which English composer Ralph Vaughan Williams based his Sea Songs, originally arranged for military band in 1923 as the second movement of his English Folk Song Suite, and subsequently re-arranged for full orchestra in 1942 by the composer.

The song was collected in the oral tradition from traditional singers in England in the twentieth century. A recording of Sam Bennett of Ilmington, Warwickshire made by James Madison Carpenter in the 1930s can be heard on the Vaughan Williams Memorial Library Website. The Copper Family also have a traditional version of the song which was passed down through several generations and is available online.

Another song has survived from the period with different air and rhythm but also known as Admiral Benbow, and it is often sung by folksingers. It begins We sailed from Virginia and thence to Fayal.

=== "Down By the Sea" (Men at Work song) ===
Benbow is briefly mentioned in the Australian new wave band Men at Work song, "Down By the Sea" ("Down on the beach/Saluting Captain Benbow"); on their 1981 album Business as Usual.

=== Other Literary Records ===
- Admiral Benbow. is Letitia Elizabeth's poetical illustration on the painting of Benbow by Sir G. Kneller, engraved by W. T. Mote (actually William Henry Mote) from Fisher's Drawing Room Scrap Book, 1838 together with a brief historical note.
