= Action of August 1702 =

1702 battle of the War of the Spanish Succession

- Part of the War of the Spanish Succession
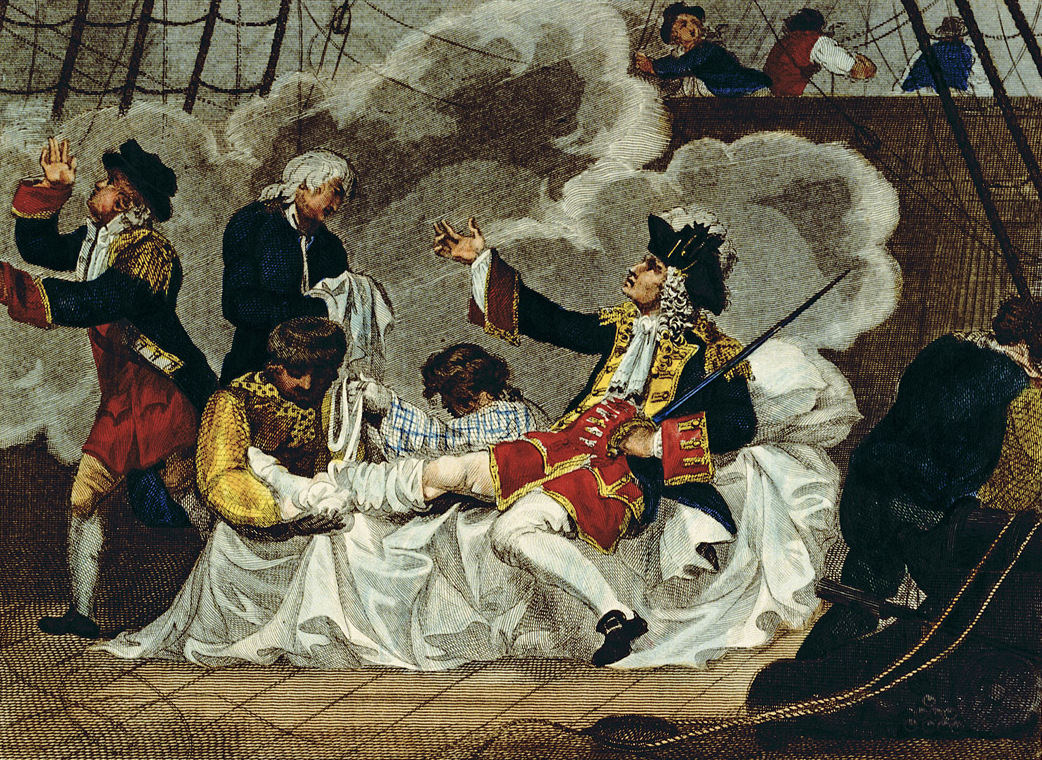
- Engraving of an injured Benbow during the battle
Date	19–25 August 1702 O.S.
Location	Off Santa Marta, Caribbean Sea 11°14′17″N 74°12′18″W
Result	Inconclusive

Belligerents
England	France

Commanders and leaders
John Benbow	Jean-Baptiste du Casse

Strength
7 ships of the line	5 ships of the line 1 fireship 4 sloops 1 galley 1 transport ship

Casualties and losses
Unknown	1 galley captured

The action of August 1702 was an inconclusive naval battle of the War of the Spanish Succession fought between 19 and 25 August 1702 O.S.. An English squadron under Vice-Admiral of the White John Benbow engaged in a running battle with a smaller French squadron under Admiral Jean-Baptiste du Casse off Santa Marta, Columbia, but insubordination from Benbow's captains prevented him from inflicting significant damage on du Casse's squadron, which escaped almost fully intact.

Benbow had been sent to the West Indies with a small squadron to prevent the French from capturing Spanish colonies there. At the same time, du Casse had sailed for Cartagena to force it to swear allegiance to Philip V. Benbow had set out to intercept du Casse's squadron upon receiving word of their movements. His squadron cited the French on 19 June, but many of the English captains refused to fully engage du Casse's ships, and one came aboard Benbow's squadron to plead with him to abandon the chase. The French squadron was able to escape with the loss of only a single galley.

Benbow lost a leg during the engagement and died of illness roughly two months later. Two of the English captains, Richard Kirkby and Cooper Wade, were convicted of cowardice and shot. Benbow's resolution to pursue the French, in what proved to be his last fight, proved irresistible to the English public imagination. The events of the fight inspired a number of ballads, usually entitled Admiral Benbow or Brave Benbow, which were still favourites among British sailors more than a century later.

== Background ==
Following the outbreak of the War of the Spanish Succession in 1701, English Vice Admiral of the White John Benbow was sent to the West Indies with a small squadron with orders to prevent French forces from capturing the Spanish colonies there. Concurrently, French Admiral Jean-Baptiste du Casse was dispatched to Cartagena with a squadron to force it to swear allegiance to Philip V. Upon receiving word of du Casse's squadron entering the region, Benbow set out to intercept them.

== Battle ==
On 19 August 1702, Benbow's squadron encountered du Casse's off Santa Marta, a little to the east of the mouth of the Magdalena River. Commanding from onboard his flagship, HMS Breda, Benbow ordered his squadron to engage the French. As HMS Defiance and HMS Windsor, astern of Breda, were showing no great haste, Benbow ordered both ships to make more sail. He intended to wait for Defiance to come up; but Falmouth began the engagement by attacking a French frigate at 4:00 pm, with Windsor a ship abreast of her. Breda joined in, but Defiance and Windsor broke off after a few broadsides and left the Breda under French fire, with the battle continuing until nightfall. Breda and HMS Ruby pursued the French throughout the night, while the rest of the English squadron straggled behind them.

The English continued to pursue du Casse's squadron continued through 20 August, with the Breda and Ruby firing their chase guns whenever they were in range of the French ships. Engaging again on the morning of the 21st, Ruby was badly damaged; Defiance and Windsor refused to fight, though abreast of the closest French ship; HMS Greenwich had now fallen five leagues astern. On the 22nd, Breda captured the French galley Anne, originally an English ship captured by the French, and the damaged Ruby was ordered to return to Port Royal. On the night of 24 August, Breda engaged one of the French ships alone, with Benbow's right leg injured by a French chain shot, returning to the quarterdeck as soon as it could be dressed. Benbow's flag captain, Christopher Fogg, ordered the other captains of the English squadron to maintain the line of battle. In response, Defiance's captain, Richard Kirkby, came aboard Breda and told Benbow "You had better desist, the French are very strong." Finding the other English captains largely of the same opinion, Benbow broke off and returned to Jamaica.

== Aftermath ==
Following his return to Jamaica, Benbow received a letter from du Casse:

Sir,
I feared last Sunday that I would be your prisoner that very day; heaven ordained otherwise, and I am not displeased. As for your cowardly captains, have them hanged, for, upon my honor, they will have earned it well.
Yours truly,
Du Casse

Such was indeed his course: Benbow court-martialled several of his captains in Jamaica. Kirkby and Cooper Wade, Greenwich's captain, were both found guilty of cowardice and sentenced to be executed by firing squad; Wade was said to have been drunk during the engagement. John Constable, HMS Windsor's captain, was cleared of charges of cowardice but was convicted on other charges and cashiered from the Royal Navy. Thomas Hudson, HMS Pendennis's captain, died before he could be tried. Fogg and fellow captain Samuel Vincent were charged with having signed a paper with the other English captains stating they would not fight, both men claimed that the paper was only intended to prevent Kirkby from fleeing; Benbow testified in their favour and Fogg and Vincent were merely suspended.

Benbow's leg was amputated, but he developed a fever and died from it on 4 November 1702. Kirkby, Wade and Constable were sent to Plymouth aboard HMS Bristol, where their sentences were confirmed by the Lord High Admiral of England, Prince George of Denmark. Kirkby and Wade were executed aboard Bristol on 16 April 1703, while Fogg and Vincent were permitted to return to the Royal Navy.

== Order of battle ==
=== Benbow's squadron ===
- HMS Breda (70), Vice-Admiral of the White John Benbow, Captain Christopher Fogg (flagship)
- HMS Defiance (64), Captain Richard Kirkby
- HMS Greenwich (54), Captain Cooper Wade
- HMS Ruby (42), Captain George Walton
- HMS Pendennis (50), Captain Thomas Hudson
- HMS Windsor (60), Captain John Constable
- HMS Falmouth (50), Captain Samuel Vincent

=== Du Casse's squadron ===
- Heureux (70), Admiral Jean-Baptiste du Casse, Captain Bennet (flagship)
- Agréable (56), Captain de Roussy
- Phénix (50), Captain de Poudens
- Apollon (50), Captain de Demuin
- Prince de Frise (56), Lieutenant de St. André
- Cauvet
- Anne
- One transport ship
- Four sloops
