= David Mitchell (Royal Navy officer) =

Royal Navy officer and courtier (1650–1710)

Rear-Admiral Sir David Mitchell
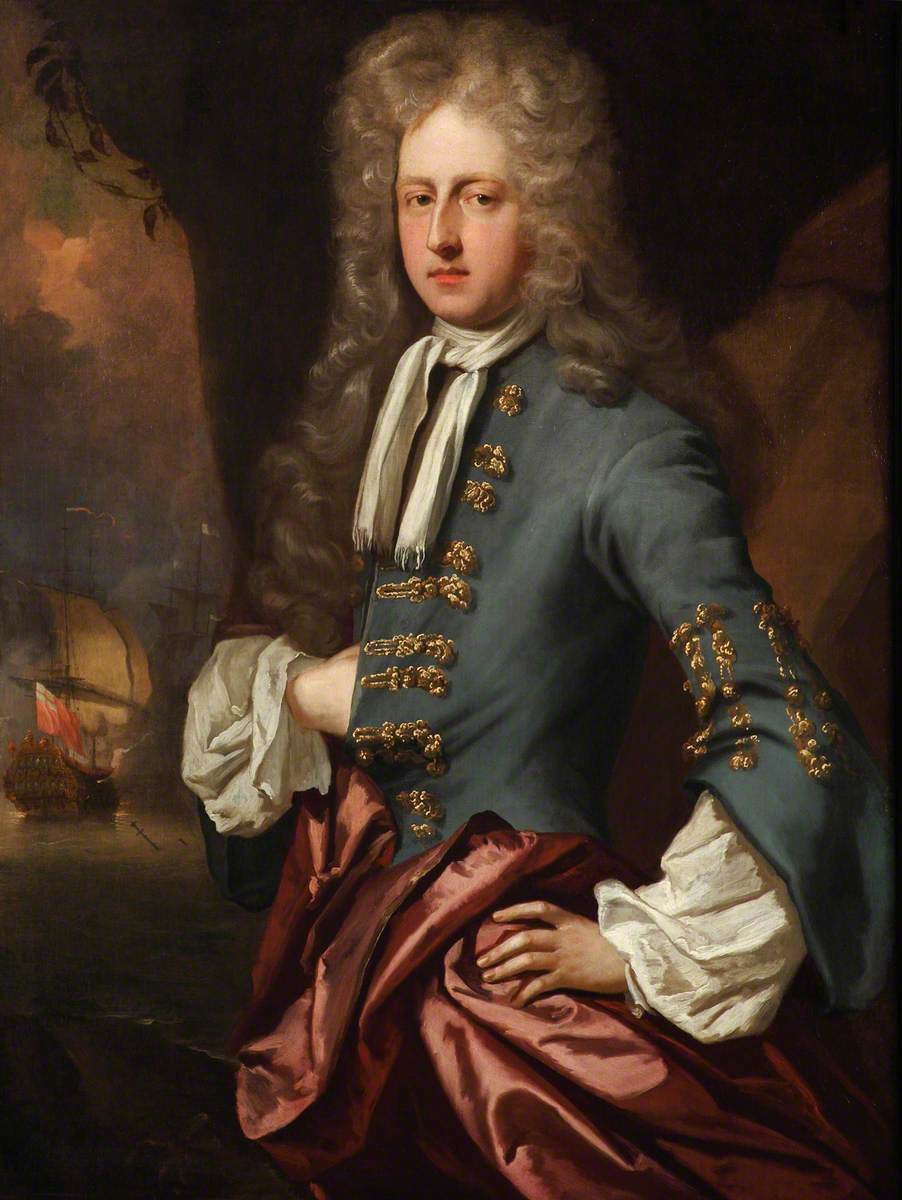
- Portrait attributed to Michael Dahl, 1688–1690
- Born: c. 1650
- Died: 1 June 1710(aged 59–60); Hatfield, Hertfordshire
- Military career
- Allegiance: Kingdom of England; Kingdom of Great Britain
- Branch: Royal Navy
- Service years: 1672–1710
- Rank: Rear-Admiral of the Red
- Commands: Ruby; Elizabeth; Britannia
- Conflicts: Third Anglo-Dutch War; Nine Years' War; Battle of Bantry Bay; Battle of Beachy Head (1690); Battles of Barfleur and La Hogue

Rear-Admiral of the Red Sir David Mitchell (c. 1650 – 1 June 1710) was a Royal Navy officer and courtier who served as the Black Rod from 1698 to 1710.

== Early life ==
David Mitchell was born c. 1650. He came from humble origins, being descended from, as John Charnock put it, a family "more distinguished for their integrity than their riches". When he was sixteen years old, his father apprenticed him to the master of a trading vessel from Leith. Having served this apprenticeship, he acted as mate aboard various vessels engaged in the Baltic trade.

== Naval career ==
On the outbreak of the Third Anglo-Dutch War in 1672, he was impressed into the Royal Navy. He is recorded serving as a midshipman aboard the Swallow in the Mediterranean from 31 October 1673 to 15 October 1674, under the captaincy of Edward Russell. He followed Russell to the Reserve in 1676, and participated in his voyage to Newfoundland. Still serving under Russell, he was promoted to second lieutenant aboard the Defiance on 16 January 1678, and as first lieutenant aboard the Swiftsure on 26 March 1679. Passed over for promotion, he remained with Russell, becoming first lieutenant of the Newcastle on 10 August 1680. When Russell fell from favour following his cousin's involvement in the Rye House Plot, Mitchell remained in the service and became first lieutenant of the Tyger on 8 May 1682. He served aboard this vessel under Vice-admiral Arthur Herbert in the Mediterranean, and returned home with him in July 1683.

On 5 February 1684, Mitchell was promoted to captain and given his first command: the Ruby. He sailed this vessel to the West Indies, where he spent two years convoying slave ships and pursuing Joseph Bannister and other pirates. He was discharged from the Ruby in October 1686 and given no other command. Eventually, he made his way to the Netherlands and joined the group of naval defectors collecting around William of Orange. Following the Glorious Revolution, Mitchell was given command of the Elizabeth which served as Herbert's flagship at the Battle of Bantry Bay, and also took part in the Battle of Beachy Head. In August 1690, Mitchell was one of four candidates put forward to Mary II for promotion to flag rank, the others being George Churchill, Matthew Aylmer and Francis Wheler. Not being one of the two chosen, he remained on the Elizabeth until given command of Russell's flagship, the Britannia, in January 1691. Apart from a four-month sojourn in the winter of 1691, when he was major of the 1st Maritime Regiment, he commanded this ship until January 1693, including at the Battles of Barfleur and La Hogue.

On 8 February 1693 Mitchell was promoted to Rear-Admiral of the Blue, hoisting his flag aboard the Essex to escort the king to Holland. He then joined the main fleet under the admirals Cloudesley Shovell, Ralph Delaval and Henry Killigrew with his flag raised onboard the Duke. By 1694 Mitchell had been promoted to Rear-Admiral of the Red, and he was knighted by William III, apparently informally, in c. May 1694 before joining Edward Russell, 1st Earl of Orford's grand fleet. Mitchell was officially made a Knight Bachelor at Kensington on 6 December 1698.

== Later life and death ==
Mitchell served as a Commissioner of the Admiralty from 1699 to 1702 and a member of the Lord High Admiral's council from 1702 to 1708. He obtained numerous royal honours and appointments, including that of Black Rod. Because of his naval knowledge, he became a close professional friend of Tsar Peter the Great. Mitchell's coat of arms are stated by De Neve to be appropriated for his tomb without justification from the Mitchells of Tillygrieg ('he bears arms, but hath no right', citing his humble background). During the Grand Embassy of Peter the Great from 1697 to 1699, Mitchell captained the flagship York, which brought Peter to England. During the voyage the Tsar was given instruction on ship handling by Mitchell, mostly in Dutch since they were both fluent in it. At the Tsar's request, Mitchell was assigned as his official escort and translator during the nearly six months Peter was in London.

== Sources ==
- archives at RootsWeb.com

Government offices
| Preceded by Sir Fleetwood Sheppard | Black Rod; 1698–1710 | Succeeded by Sir William Oldes |
