= Richard Kirby =

Richard Kirby (or Kirkby) may refer to:

- Richard Kirkby (c. 1625–1681), English politician
- Richard Kirby (cricketer) (1861–1947), Australian cricketer
- Richard Kirkby (Royal Navy officer) (c. 1657–1703), Royal Navy captain
- Sir Richard Kirby (arbitrator) (1904–2001), Australian industrial relations arbitrator
- Rick Kirby (born 1952), British sculptor

== See also ==
- Richard Kirby Ridgeway (1848–1924), Irish soldier
