= HMS Defiance (1675) =

Ship of the line of the Royal Navy

History

Great Britain
- Name: HMS Defiance
- Builder: Phineas Pett II, Chatham Dockyard
- Launched: 1675
- Fate: Broken up, 1749

General characteristics as built
- Class & type: 64-gun third rate ship of the line
- Tons burthen: 890 tons
- Length: 117 ft (36 m) (keel)
- Beam: 37 ft 10 in (11.53 m)
- Depth of hold: 15 ft 10 in (4.83 m)
- Propulsion: Sails
- Sail plan: Full-rigged ship
- Armament: 64 guns of various weights of shot

General characteristics after 1695 rebuild
- Class & type: 64-gun third rate ship of the line
- Tons burthen: 902 tons
- Length: 143 ft 10 in (43.84 m) (gundeck)
- Beam: 37 ft 11 in (11.56 m)
- Depth of hold: 15 ft 8 in (4.78 m)
- Propulsion: Sails
- Sail plan: Full-rigged ship
- Armament: 64 guns of various weights of shot

General characteristics after 1707 rebuild
- Class & type: 66-gun third rate ship of the line
- Tons burthen: 949 tons
- Length: 146 ft 3 1/2 in (44.6 m) (gundeck)
- Beam: 38 ft 6 in (11.73 m)
- Depth of hold: 15 ft 9 1/2 in (4.8 m)
- Propulsion: Sails
- Sail plan: Full-rigged ship
- Armament: 66 guns of various weights of shot

HMS Defiance was a 64-gun third rate ship of the line of the Royal Navy, built by Phineas Pett II at Chatham Dockyard, and launched in 1675.

In the summer of 1678, Defiance was under the command of John Ernle.

She was rebuilt at Woolwich Dockyard in 1695, again as a 64-gun ship.

Defiance was part of a squadron under Vice-Admiral John Benbow in August 1702. In an action between Benbow's squadron and the squadron of the French Admiral Jean du Casse, Defiance under Captain Richard Kirkby was one of the ships that refused to engage. Along with Windsor, Defiance bore away from the French squadron after only two or three broadsides, and stood out of range. At his court-martial, Captain Kirkby was convicted of cowardice and sentenced to be shot.

In 1707, she was rebuilt for a second time, relaunching from Deptford Dockyard as a 66-gun third rate.

Defiance was reduced to a fourth rate in 1716.

On 30 August 1739, command of her was given to Captain John Trevor.

She was hulked in 1743 and was broken up in 1749.
