= HMS Falmouth (1693) =

Ship of the line of the Royal Navy

History

England
- Name: Falmouth
- Namesake: Viscount Falmouth
- Ordered: 1 January 1692
- Builder: Edward Snelgrove, Limehouse
- Launched: 25 June 1693
- Commissioned: 1693
- Captured: 4 August 1704, by the French
- Fate: Wrecked 1706, then burnt 1707

General characteristics
- Class & type: 50-gun fourth rate ship of the line
- Tons burthen: 610 63/94 (bm)
- Length: 124 ft (37.8 m) (gundeck) 101 ft 6.5 in (30.9 m) (keel)
- Beam: 33 ft 7.5 in (10.2 m)
- Depth of hold: 13 ft 9 in (4.2 m)
- Sail plan: Full-rigged ship
- Complement: 230 (wartime); 160 (peace)
- Armament: 54 guns of various weights of shot

HMS Falmouth was a 50-gun fourth rate ship of the line built for Royal Navy in the 1690s. She was the first of a batch of seven ships ordered during 1692 to the "123-ft" specification (the others being the Portland, Anglesea, Dartmouth, Rochester, Southampton and a replacement Norwich). The ship participated in several battles during the Nine Years' War of 1688–97 and the War of the Spanish Succession (1701–1715), including the action of August 1702. She was captured by the French in 1704.

== Description ==
Falmouth had a length at the gundeck of 124 feet (37.8 m) and 101 feet 6.5 inches (30.9 m) at the keel. She had a beam of 33 feet 7.5 inches (10.2 m), and a depth of hold of 13 feet 9 inches (4.2 m). The ship's tonnage was 610 63/94 tons burthen. Records of Falmouth's original armament have not survived, but most of her sister ships were armed with 20 twelve-pounder guns, 22 eight-pounder guns and 8 minions (4-pounders) in 1696. When re-armed in accordance with the 1703 Establishment of Guns, her armament consisted of 22 twelve-pounder guns on the lower gundeck and 22 six-pounder guns on the upper deck. On the quarterdeck were 8 six-pounder guns with another pair on the forecastle. The ship had a crew of 160–230 officers and ratings.

== Construction and career ==
Falmouth was the second ship in the Royal Navy to be named in honour of Viscount Falmouth (George Fitzroy), rather than the eponymous port. The ship was ordered on 1 January 1693 and contracted out to Edward Snelgrove in Limehouse. She was launched on 25 June 1693 and commissioned that same year.

The ship took part in the action of August 1702 and on the fourth and fifth days of the battle supported Admiral John Benbow's attacks when other members of the squadron failed to do so. On 4 August 1704 she was attacked by two French privateers of Rene Duguay-Trouin's squadron off the Isles of Scilly. There was a vigorous exchange of fire during which Falmouth's captain, Thomas Kenney, was killed. Falmouth was then surrendered to the French. The French sold her for merchant service at Brest in January 1706; she grounded near Buenos Aires in September 1706 with nearly all of her crew dead of illness and privation, and was burnt in February 1707.

== See also ==
- List of ships captured in the 18th century
