= HMS Harwich (1695) =

Ship of the line of the Royal Navy

History

England
- Name: HMS Harwich
- Ordered: 18 November 1694
- Builder: Robert & John Castle, Deptford
- Launched: 14 September 1695
- Fate: Wrecked, 5 October 1700

General characteristics
- Class & type: 50-gun fourth rate ship of the line
- Tons burthen: 683 41/94 bm
- Length: 130 ft 2 in (39.7 m) (gundeck); 109 ft (33.2 m) (keel)
- Beam: 34 ft 4 in (10.5 m)
- Depth of hold: 13 ft 8 in (4.2 m)
- Propulsion: Sails
- Sail plan: Full-rigged ship
- Armament: 50 guns: Lower gundeck 20 x 12 pdr guns; Upper gundeck 22 x demi-culverins (9 pdr guns); Quarterdeck 6 x minions (4 pdr guns); Forecastle 2 x minions (4 pdr guns)

HMS Harwich was a 50-gun fourth rate ship of the line of the English Royal Navy, ordered on 18 November 1694 as one of two such ships (the other was the Pendennis) to be built by commercial contract by Robert and John Castle at their yard at Deptford. The Harwich was launched on 14 September and commissioned under Captain Andrew Douglas 1695.

The Harwich was one of four ships sent to Madagascar on an anti-piracy mission under Thomas Warren in 1699. Warren died on 12 November at Madagascar and was succeeded in command by Captain William Cock.

The Harwich was wrecked on 5 October 1700 while careening in China.
