= HMS Greenwich (1666) =

Ship of the line of the Royal Navy

History

Great Britain
- Name: HMS Greenwich
- Builder: Christopher Pett, Woolwich Dockyard
- Launched: 1666
- Fate: Wrecked, 1744

General characteristics as built
- Class & type: 54-gun fourth-rate ship of the line
- Tons burthen: 646 tons
- Length: 110 ft (34 m) (keel)
- Beam: 33 ft 6 in (10.21 m)
- Depth of hold: 14 ft 6 in (4.42 m)
- Propulsion: Sails
- Sail plan: Full-rigged ship
- Armament: 54 guns of various weights of shot

General characteristics after 1699 rebuild
- Class & type: 46-54-gun fourth-rate ship of the line
- Tons burthen: 785 tons
- Length: 135 ft 10 in (41.40 m) (gundeck)
- Beam: 36 ft (11 m)
- Depth of hold: 13 ft 6 1/2 in (4.1 m)
- Propulsion: Sails
- Sail plan: Full-rigged ship
- Armament: 46-54 guns of various weights of shot

General characteristics after 1730 rebuild
- Class & type: 1719 Establishment 50-gun fourth-rate ship of the line
- Tons burthen: 759 tons
- Length: 134 ft (41 m) (gundeck)
- Beam: 36 ft (11 m)
- Depth of hold: 15 ft 2 in (4.62 m)
- Propulsion: Sails
- Sail plan: Full-rigged ship
- Armament: 50 guns: Gundeck: 22 × 18 pdrs; Upper gundeck: 22 × 9 pdrs; Quarterdeck: 4 × 6 pdrs; Forecastle: 2 × 6 pdrs

HMS Greenwich was a 54-gun fourth-rate ship of the line of the Royal Navy, built by Christopher Pett at Woolwich Dockyard and launched in 1666.

Greenwich was rebuilt at Portsmouth Dockyard in 1699 as a fourth-rate of 46–54 guns. She fought at the action of August 1702 as part of a squadron under Admiral John Benbow, but hung back from the engagement. As a result, her Captain Cooper Wade was tried and convicted of cowardice and shot. On 16 April 1724 she was ordered to be taken to pieces at Chatham, and rebuilt as a 50-gun fourth-rate to the dimensions of the 1719 Establishment, relaunching on 15 February 1730.

On 20 October 1744, whilst preparing to come alongside the hulk HMS Lark, they were struck by hurricane-force winds which caused severe damage to both vessels, which subsequently sank. From Greenwich, Captain Allen and 85 others were drowned. His Majesty's ships St Albans, Bonetta and Thunder were also lost in this incident.
