= HMS Gloucester (1695) =

Ship of the line of the Royal Navy

History

Great Britain
- Name: Gloucester
- Ordered: 27 March 1693
- Builder: Thomas Clements, Bristol
- Launched: 5 February 1695
- Commissioned: 1695
- Decommissioned: 24 April 1708
- Fate: Broken up, October 1731

General characteristics (as built)
- Class & type: 60-gun fourth rate ship of the line
- Tons burthen: 896 9/94 bm
- Length: 145 ft 2 in (44.2 m) (Gundeck)
- Beam: 37 ft 5 in (11.4 m)
- Depth of hold: 15 ft 8 in (4.8 m)
- Sail plan: Full-rigged ship
- Complement: 240–365
- Armament: 60 guns: Gundeck: 22 × 24-pdr cannon; Upper gundeck: 24 × 9-pdr demi-culverins; Quarterdeck: 10 × 6-pdr cannon; Poop deck: 4 × 3-pdr cannon

HMS Gloucester was a 60-gun fourth rate ship of the line built for the Royal Navy during the 1690s. She spent most of her career in the West Indies and participated in the 1701–15 War of the Spanish Succession. The ship was hulked in 1708 and broken up in 1731.

== Description ==
Gloucester had a length at the gundeck of 145 feet 2 inches (44.2 m) and 120 feet 4 inches (36.7 m) at the keel. She had a beam of 37 feet 5 inches (11.4 m) and a depth of hold of 15 feet 8 inches (4.8 m). The ship's tonnage was 896 9/94 tons burthen. The ship was initially armed with twenty-two 24-pounder cannon on her main gundeck, twenty-two 9-pounder demi-culverins on her upper gundeck, ten 6-pounder cannon on the quarterdeck and four 3-pounder guns on the poop deck. This was revised in 1703 to twenty-four 18-pounder culverins, twenty-six 9-pounder demi-culverins and fourteen 6-pounders. The ship had a crew of 240–365 officers and ratings.

== Construction and career ==
Gloucester, named after the eponymous port, was the second ship of her name to serve in the Royal Navy. She was ordered on 27 March 1693 as a part of the 1691 Naval Programme from Thomas Clements of Bristol. The ship, however, was not launched until 5 May 1695. Commissioned that same year, she cost £8,659 to build; Clements was paid a further £47 for excess work done, but £241 was deducted for work not performed.

Gloucester served as the flagship for Rear-Admiral John Benbow in 1698 as he cruised the West Indies and remained there until 1703. The ship returned to home waters in 1704 before sailing to Brazil in 1706. She was hulked on 24 April 1708, and was broken up in October 1731.
