= English ship Ruby (1652) =

Frigate Ship of Royal Navy

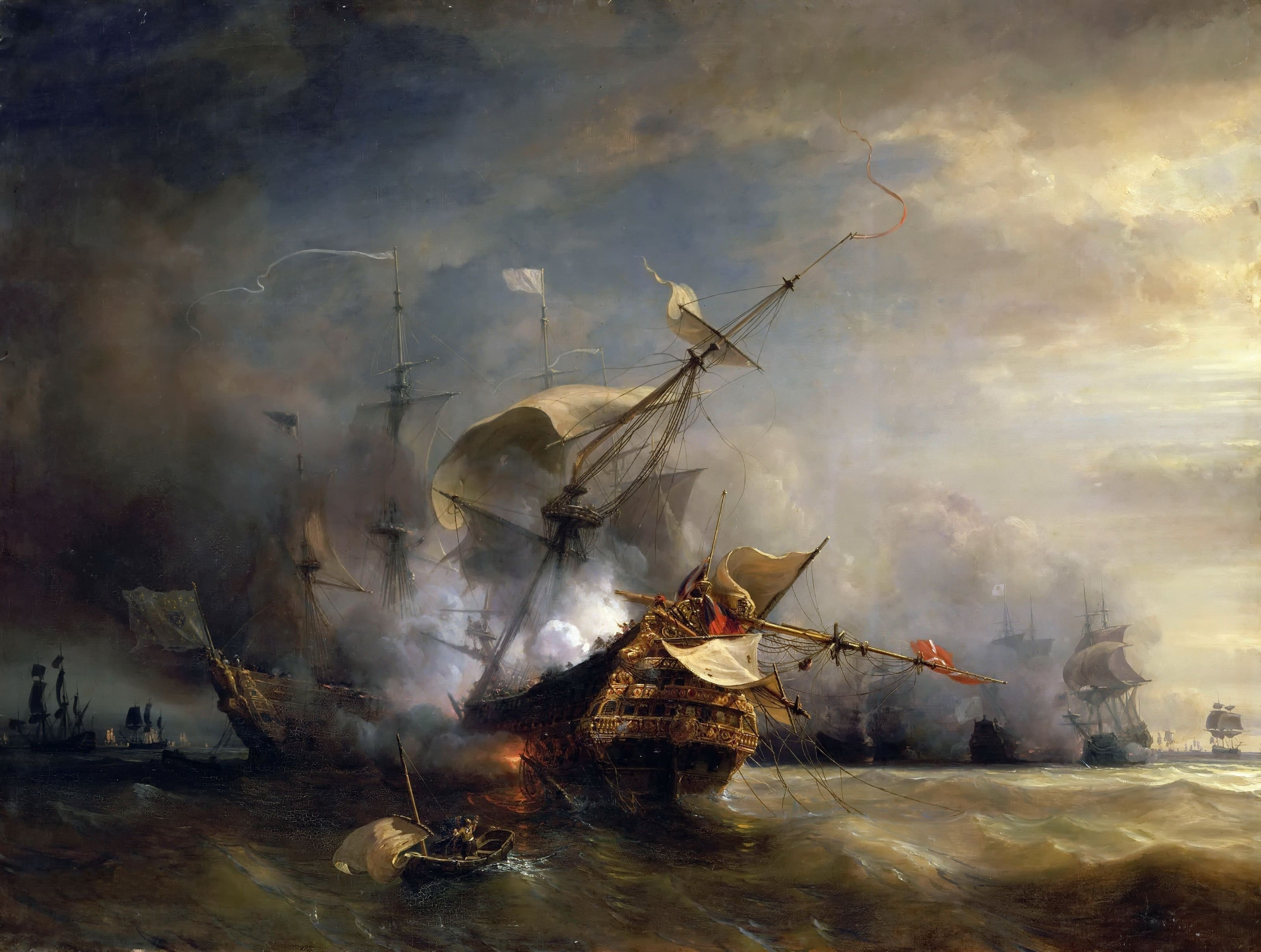
- Possible depiction of Ruby at the Battle at The Lizard

History

Commonwealth of England
- Name: Ruby
- Ordered: May 1651
- Builder: Deptford Dockyard
- Launched: 15 March 1652
- Commissioned: 1653

Kingdom of England
- Acquired: May 1660
- Renamed: HMS Ruby

Great Britain
- Captured: 21 October 1707 (by the French ship Mars)
- Fate: Not incorporated into French Navy; sold into commercial service

General characteristics as built
- Tons burthen: 556 77/94 tons (bm)
- Length: 125 ft 6 in (38.3 m) gundeck; 105 ft 6 in (32.2 m) Keel for tonnage
- Beam: 31 ft 6 in (9.6 m)
- Depth of hold: 15 ft 9 in (4.8 m)
- Sail plan: ship-rigged
- Complement: 226
- Armament: 40 guns (1660); 48 guns (1677)

General characteristics after 1706 rebuild
- Class & type: 46-54-gun fourth rate
- Tons burthen: 674 88/94 tons (bm)
- Length: 128 ft 4 in (39.1 m) gundeck; 105 ft 7 in (32.2 m) keel for tonnage
- Beam: 34 ft 8 in (10.6 m)
- Depth of hold: 13 ft 7 in (4.1 m)
- Sail plan: ship-rigged
- Complement: 280/185 personnel
- Armament: 54/46 guns 1703 Establishment; 22/20 × 12-pounder guns (LD); 20/18 × 6-pounder guns (UD); 8/6 × 6-pounder guns (QD); 2 × 6-pounder guns (Fc)

HMS Ruby was a 40-gun frigate of the English navy, built by Peter Pett at Deptford. She took part in actions during all three of the Anglo-Dutch Wars of 1652–1654, 1665–1667 and 1672–1674. Ruby later served in the West Indies, and in 1683 was sent to the Leeward Islands to protect English colonies there against pirate attacks. In 1687, the English pirate Joseph Bannister was captured by the crew of Ruby and brought to Port Royal for trial. She was rebuilt in 1687, and was captured by the French in October 1707.

== Construction and specifications ==
The English Ruby was ordered by the Rump Parliament in May 1651, to be built at Deptford Dockyard under the guidance of Peter Pett. Her dimensions were gundeck 125 feet 6 inches (38.3 metres) with 105 feet 6 inches (32.2 metres) keel for tonnage with a breadth of 31 feet 6 inches (9.6 metres) and a depth of hold of 15 feet 9 inches (4.8 metres). Her builder's measure tonnage was calculated as 556 77/94 tons.

Rubys gun armament was 42/40 guns during the period from 1652 to 1660. Under the 1666 Establishment, her armament was nominally set at 46 guns, consisting of twenty-two culverins, (Note: The culverin was a gun of 4,500 pounds with a 5.5-inch bore firing a 17.5-pound shot with a twelve-pound powder charge) twenty demi-culverins, (Note: The demi-culverin was a gun of 3,400 pounds with a four-inch bore firing a 9.5-pound shot with an eight-pound powder charge) four sakers. (Note: The sacar or saker was a gun of 1,400 pounds with a 3.5-inch bore firing a 5.5-pound shot with a 5.5-pound powder charge) In 1666 she actually carried 48 guns by shipping an extra pair of demi-culverins. The 1677 establishment set her guns at 48 guns with six sakers (ignoring the extra pair of demi-culverins). By 1685 her guns were still at 48 guns with the sakers reduced to four. The 1696 Survey listed her armament as twenty-two 12-pounder guns on the lower deck (instead of culverins), and only nineteen demi-culverins and no sakers. Her manning was 150 men in March 1652, rising to 180 at the end of 1653. She had 170 men in 1666. by 1685 establishment her manning was 230/200/150 personnel based on the amount of weaponry carried.

Ruby was completed with an initial cost of £4,175.12.6d (Note: The cost accounting for inflation of approximately £753,900 in reference to today) or at the contract price of 556 3/4 tons @ £7.10.0d (Note: The cost accounting for inflation of approximately £1,300 in reference to today.) per ton.

== Commissioned service ==
=== Service with the Commonwealth Navy ===
Ruby was commissioned in 1652 under the command of Captain John Lambert. Anthony Houlding took over later that year. Ruby was part of Robert Blake's squadron in Rye Bay that participated in the Battle of Dover on 19 May 1652. She followed this with the Battle of Kentish Knock on 28 September 1652. On 18 February 1653 she was with Blake's fleet during the Battle of Portland, when her commander, Captain Houlding, was killed during the fight. Robert Sanders took over command after the battle. Ruby was a member of White Squadron, Centre Division at the Battle of the Gabbard on 2–3 June 1653. She was under the command of Captain Edmund Curtis prior to the Battle of Scheveningen off Texel on 31 July 1653. She spent the winter of 1653/54 at St Helens. She then joined Blake's fleet and sailed to the Mediterranean in 1654/55. In 1858 she had a new commander in Captain Robert Kirby, remaining in the Mediterranean with Blake. She partook in the Battle of Santa Cruz on 20 April 1657. She returned to England in 1659, carrying out operations in Plymouth Sound.

=== Service after the Restoration of May 1660 ===
On 27 May 1661 she was under the command of Captain Robert Robinson with the Earl of Sandwich's Squadron at Tangier and Lisbon in 1662. She was placed in Ordinary ib December 1662. On 11 October 1664 she was under the command of Captain Sir William Jennings for the start of the Second Anglo-Dutch War. She was at the Battle of Lowestoft as a member of White Squadron, Center Division on 2 June 1665. She saw action at the Battle of the Galloper Sand the Four Days' Battle as a member of Red Squadron, Center Division from 1 to 4 June 1666. She suffered 10 killed and 32 wounded in the battle. On 8 June 1666 she came under the command of Captain Thomas Lamming. She was at the Battle of Orfordness the St James Day Battle still in the Red Squadron, Center Division on 25 July 1667. Captain Lamming died on 30 September 1667. Captain Robinson took command again on 21 May 1668 to sail with Sir Thomas Allin's Squadron to the Mediterranean. Captain Robinson left command on 22 April 1669.

Captain Richard Sadlington took command on 24 August 1672 followed three days later on the 27th by Captain Stephen Pyend. She partook in the Battle of Solebay as a member of Blue Squadron on 28 May 1672. She followed this with the First Battle of Schooneveld on 28 May 1673 then the second on 4 June 1673. Her last battle in the Third Anglo-Dutch war was the Battle of Texel on 11 August 1673. Captain Pyend died on 8 June 1674.

On 26 March 1678 she was under the command of Captain Thomas Allen for service in the English Channel. On 15 April 1679 she sailed to Bilbao, returning home in May. In June she sailed with a convoy for the Straits of Gibraltar returning in August 1679. In March 1680 she sailed to Lisbon with the Portuguese Ambassador on board. In June she took troop reinforcements for Tangiers.

Ruby was one of the ships that sailed with the warship HMS Gloucester when was conveying James Stuart, Duke of York (the future King James II of England) to Scotland. On 6 May 1682, Gloucester struck a sandbank off the Norfolk coast, and quickly sank. The Duke was saved, but as many as 250 people drowned, including members of the royal party.

On 18 November 1682, Richard May became her new captain, who then sailed for Jamaica in 1683 and returned in 1684. In 1683 she protected English colonies against pirate attacks. In October 1683 Captain David Mitchell took command at Jamaica. She was ordered rebuilt at Blackwall in 1687.

=== Rebuild at Blackwall 1687 ===
She was ordered to be rebuilt by Henry Johnson of Blackwall on the River Thames. She was launched in 1687. Her dimensions were gundeck 125 feet 7 inches (38.3 metres) with 105 feet 6 inches (32.2 metres) keel for tonnage with a breadth of 31 feet 6 inches (9.6 metres) and a depth of hold of 13 feet 0 inches (4.0 metres). Her builder's measure tonnage was calculated as 556 77/94 tons.

In the 1688 survey her armament was established at 48 guns. This consisted of twenty-two culverin drakes, (Note: Drakes were a type gun of various calibres capable of firing grapeshot) twenty-two demi-culverin drakes and four saker cutts. (Note: Cutts were a type gun of various calibres whose length had been reduced after manufacture) Under the 1696 survey her armament was reduced to 42 guns consisting of twenty-two 12-pounder guns and nineteen demi-culverins.

=== Service after rebuild 1687 ===
She was commissioned in August 1688 under Captain Frederick Froud to sail with Dartmouth's Fleet in October 1688. She was at the Battle of Bantry Bay on 1 May 1689. In 1691 she came under Captain George Mees for cruising, then sailed with a convoy to the North Coast in April 1692. She was at the Battle of Barfleur from19 to 24 May 1692. Afterwards she was sent to reconnoiter the French Port of St Malo. In 1693 She came under the command of Captain Robert Dean and she sailed with Wheeler's Squadron in the West Indies. In 1694 she was under Captain Robert Fairfax for cruising in the North Sea. She took a Brest 46-gun privateer L'Entreprenant (renamed Ruby Prize) in April 1694. She also captured La Diligente of Duguay-Trouin's squadron off the ilses of Scilly on 12 May 1694. In 1696 Captain Robert Holmes became her commander. She sailed with Mee's Squadron to the West indies where Captain Holmes died in July 1697. In 1698 she came under Captain William Hockaday. She paid off in July 1698. She recommissioned in 1701 under Captain Richard Kirby and sailed with Admiral John Benbow's Squadron to the West Indies. In March 1702 she was under Captain George Walton. She took part in the action of August 1702 as part of a fleet under Admiral John Benbow. She was one of the only ships to support the Admiral in HMS Breda in that engagement. In 1703 she was under command of Captain Henry Hobart. In 1706 she was ordered rebuilt at Deptford.

=== Rebuild and service (1706) ===
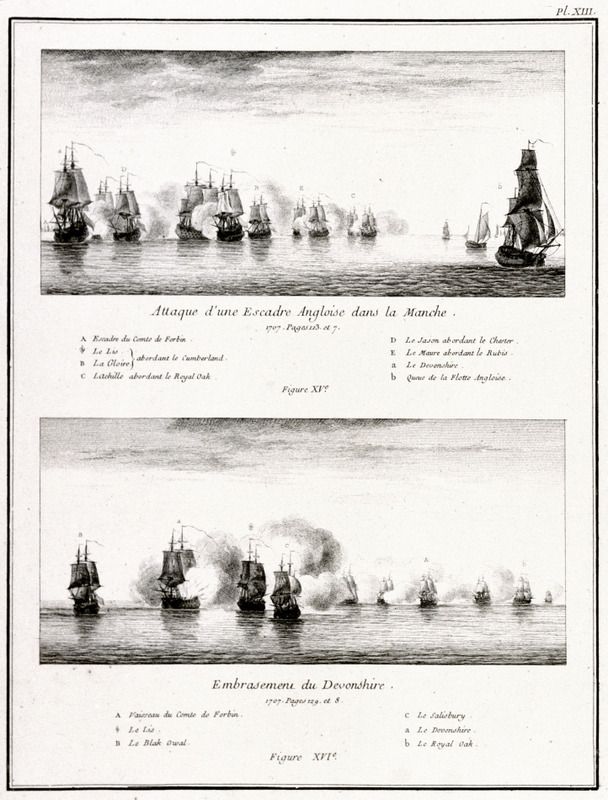
A print published in France shows Ruby during the Action of 2 May 1707 off Beachy Head

She was ordered to be rebuilt on 29 February 1704 At Deptford Dockyard under the guidance of Master Shipwright Joseph Allin. She was launched 18 February 1706. Her dimensions were gundeck 128 feet 4 inches (39.1 metres) with 105 feet 7 inches (32.2 metres) keel for tonnage with a breadth of 34 feet 8 inches (10.6 metres) and a depth of hold of 13 feet 7 inches (4.1 metres). Her builder's measure tonnage was calculated as 674 88/94 tons.

She was armed in accordance with the 1703 Establishment. This consisted of twenty-two/twenty 12-pounder guns on the lower deck, twenty-two/eighteen 6-pounder guns on the upper deck (UD), eight/six 6-pounder guns on the quarterdeck and two 6-pounder guns on the foc's'le (Fc). Her manning was set at 280 men for wartime and 185 for peacetime.

She was commissioned in 1706 under the command of Peregrine Bertie (5th son of Earl of Abingdon) to sail with Whitaker's Squadron. The squadron sailed to the Virgin Islands in 1707.

== Loss ==
She sailed with Edward's Squadron to escort a convoy to Lisbon in October 1707. The convoy was attacked by the combined squadrons of Duguay-Trouin and Forbin. The Devonshire exploded, Cumberland, Chester and Ruby were captured. Only Royal Oak escaped. Ruby was captured by the 70-gun Mars on 10 October 1707. She was not added to the French Fleet but was condemned at Brest in 1708 and sold for commercial use. Captain Bertie died in captivity in 1709.

== Sources ==
- Burns, Alan (1965). History of the British West Indies. Allen & Unwin. OCLC 186233189.
- Jowitt, Claire (2022). "The Last Voyage of the Gloucester (1682): The Politics of a Royal Shipwreck". The English Historical Review. 137 (586): 728–762. doi:10.1093/ehr/ceac127.
- Lavery, Brian (1983). The Ship of the Line. Vol. 1: The Development of the Battlefleet 1650–1850. Conway Maritime Press. ISBN 978-0-85177-252-3.
- Winfield, Rif (2009). British Warships in the Age of Sail 1603–1714: design, construction, careers and fates. Barnsley, UK: Seaforth Publishing. ISBN 978-1-84832-040-6.
1. Fleet Actions, 1.1 Battle off Dover 19 May 1652
2. Fleet Actions, 1.3 Battle of Kentish Knock 28 September 1652
3. Fleet Actions, 1.5 Battle off Portland (the 'Three Days Battle') 18–20 February 1653
4. Fleet Actions, 1.7 Battle of the Gabbard (North Foreland) 2–3 June 1653
5. Fleet Actions, 1.8 Battle of Scheveningen (off Texel) 31 July 1653
6. Fleet Actions, 2.2 Battle of Santa Cruz 20 April 1657
7. Fleet Actions, 3.1 Battle of Lowestoft 3 June 1665
8. Fleet Actions, 3.3 Battle of the Galloper Sand (the Four Days' Battle) 1–4 June 1666
9. Fleet Actions, 3.4 Battle of Orfordness (the St James Day Battle) 25–6 July 1666
10. Fleet Actions, 5.2 Battle of Solebay (Southwold Bay) 28 May 1672
11. Fleet Actions, 5.3 First Battle of Schooneveld 28 May 1673
12. Fleet Actions, 5.4 Second Battle of Schooneveld 4 June 1673
13. Fleet Actions, 5.5 Battle of Texel 11 August

1673

1. Fleet Actions, 6.1 Battle of Bantry Bay 1 May 1689
2. Fleet Actions, 6.3 Battle of Barfleur 19–22 May 1692
3. Fleet Actions, 7.1 1st Battle off Santa Maria (Columbia) (Benbow's Action) 19–24 August 1702
4. Fleet Actions, 7.5 Battle off the Lizard (Edward's Action) 10 October 1707
5. Chapter 4 Fourth Rates - 'Small Ships', Vessels acquired from 25 March 1603, Ruby Class, Ruby
6. Chapter 4 Fourth Rates - 'Small Ships', Vessels acquired from 2 May 1660, Rebuilt Vessels (1681–87), Ruby
7. Chapter 4 Fourth Rates - 'Small Ships', Vessels acquired from 2 May 1660, Post-1702 Rebuildings (54-gun Type), Ruby
- Colledge, J. J.; Warlow, Ben (2006) [1969]. Ships of the Royal Navy: The Complete Record of All Fighting Ships of the Royal Navy from the 15th Century to the Present (3rd Rev ed.). London: Chatham Publishing. ISBN 978-1-86176-281-8. OCLC 67375475.
- Lavery, Brian (1989). The Arming and Fitting of English Ships of War 1800 - 1815. US Naval Institute Press. ISBN 978-0-87021-009-9.
