= Jean-Baptiste du Casse =

French Navy officer, privateer, slave trader and colonial administrator

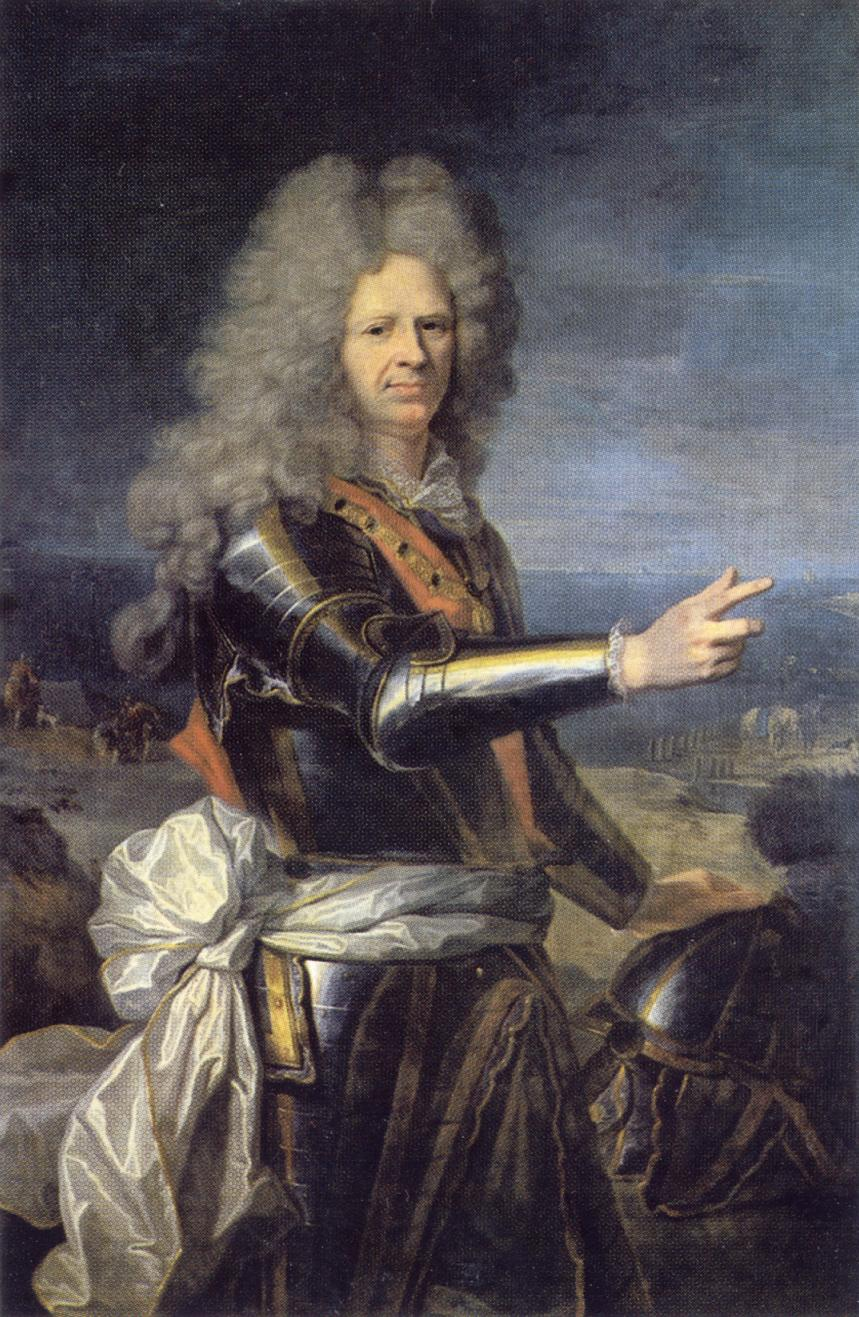
- Portrait attributed to Hyacinthe Rigaud

Governor of Saint-Domingue
- In office 1 October 1691 – July 1700
- Preceded by: Office established
- Succeeded by: Joseph d'Honon de Gallifet

Personal details
- Born: 2 August 1646 Saubusse or Pau, France
- Died: 25 June 1715 (aged 68) Bourbon-l'Archambault, Auvergne
- Spouse: Marthe (de) Baudry (1661-1743)
- Relations: Marthe du Casse (daughter); Jean-Baptiste de La Rochefoucauld de Roye (grandson)
- Awards: Order of the Golden Fleece; Commander of the Royal and Military Order of Saint Louis

Military service
- Allegiance: France
- Branch/service: French Navy
- Years of service: 1686–1714
- Rank: Lieutenant général des armées navales
- Battles/wars: Nine Years' War; War of the Spanish Succession; Action of August 1702; Battle of Málaga (1704); Wager's Action

Lieutenant général des armées navales Jean-Baptiste du Casse (2 August 1646 – 25 June 1715) was a French Navy officer, privateer, slave trader and colonial administrator who served as the first governor of Saint-Domingue from 1691 to 1700. Born on 2 August 1646 in Saubusse, France to a Huguenot family, du Casse enlisted in the French merchant navy before joining the French East India Company and the Compagnie du Sénégal. He subsequently joined the French navy and took part in several victorious expeditions during the Nine Years' War in the West Indies and South America.

During the War of the Spanish Succession, he participated in several major military engagements, including the Battle of Málaga and the siege of Barcelona. For his service, du Casse was made a knight of the Order of the Golden Fleece by King Philip V of Spain. In the midst of these wars, he served as governor of the French colony of Saint-Domingue from 1691 to 1700. Du Casse ended his military career at the rank of lieutenant général des armées navales and commander of the Royal and Military Order of Saint Louis. He died on 25 June 1715 in Bourbon-l'Archambault, Auvergne.

== Origins and Family ==
As fixed spellings of surnames was not yet common practice in his time, du Casse's surname has a variety of different spellings. The spelling of du Casse is from his birth record, but other records show Ducasse, Ducas, and Du Casse. His grand-nephew, Robert, who wrote a biography of Jean-Baptiste in 1876, spells both his great-uncle's and his own as du Casse.

Uncertainty exists around the birth of du Casse. Though he is usually said to have been born on 2 August 1646 in Saubusse, near Dax (Landes), the son of Bertrand Ducasse, a Bayonne ham merchant, and Marguerite de Lavigne, he was actually born in Pau to Jacques Ducasse and Judith Remy. His father Jacques was the son of Gaillard Ducasse, a minister in the Reformed Church of France, which designated the family as Huguenots. Because Huguenots were persecuted at this time in France, and their career prospects were limited, it is thought that du Casse forged his baptismal record to hide his Huguenot and ignoble background. Early biographers, including his grand-nephew and Saint-Simon, perpetuated this error in their works.

Du Casse admitted his family's religious background in a letter to Naval Minister Pontchartrain in 1691, and local records from Pau also support the Huguenot origins of the du Casse family. He renounced his Calvinist faith in 1685, however, after Louis XIV revoked the Edict of Nantes via the Edict of Fontainebleau.

He married Marthe (de) Baudry (1661-1743) on 16 March 1686 in Dieppe. She came from a family closely tied to banking and colonial trade. They had one daughter, Marthe du Casse, who married Louis de La Rochefoucauld, Marquis de Roye (1672-1751). Her father offered a dowry of 1,200,000 livres, an incredible sum at the time. Marthe and Louis had a son, Jean-Baptiste de La Rochefoucauld de Roye, who became a naval officer and led the ill-fated Duc d'Anville Expedition.

== Career ==
=== Slave trade ===
He went into the Atlantic slave trade with the Compagnie de Sénégal, sailing between Africa and the Caribbean. With the money he earned from the slave trade he bought a ship in Saint-Domingue and began a career as a privateer. He eventually sailed to France and offered half of his loot to the Crown; for this he was appointed ship-of-the-line lieutenant in the French Navy by Louis XIV.

=== Nine Years' War ===
In 1687, du Casse unsuccessfully attempted to capture Elmina from the Dutch, and in June 1689 he attacked Berbice and Fort Zeelandia in Surinam. He attacked Saint Kitts shortly afterward alongside Jean Fantin, during which Fantin's handful of English crewmen (led by William Kidd and Robert Culliford) mutinied and stole Fantin's ship.

In 1691, du Casse was appointed governor of Saint-Domingue, and gained the respect of the buccaneers of the island. He launched attacks against nearby English colonies, including the colony of Jamaica, in 1692. Du Casse's forces plundered Port Royal, which had just been struck by a devastating earthquake. In 1694, his forces were defeated by the English at Carlisle Bay, and he withdrew to Saint-Domingue.

In 1697, under Bernard Desjean, Baron de Pointis, he captured the Spanish American city of Cartagena de Indias, but did not receive the promised 20% share of the loot. Du Casse proceeded to sail to France to claim his share from Louis XIV in person. He and his men received a compensation of 1.4 million francs. Furthermore, he was promoted to admiral and made a knight in the order of Saint Louis.

=== War of the Spanish Succession ===
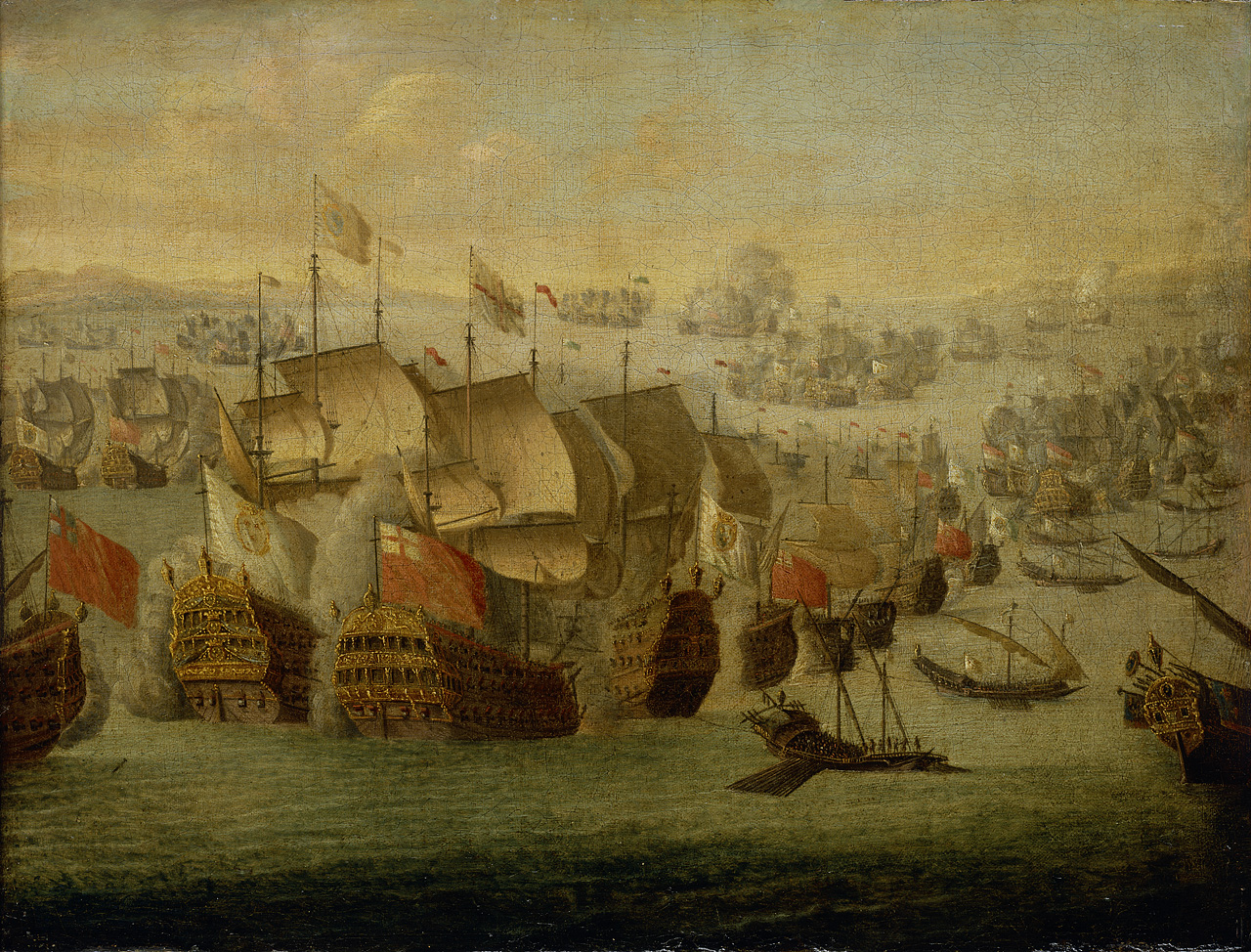
c. 1704 painting of the Battle of Málaga by Isaac Sailmaker

On 19 August 1702, du Casse, commanding a French squadron, was attacked by a larger English squadron under Vice-admiral John Benbow off Santa Marta. Despite Benbow vigorously attacking the French, du Casse's squadron managed to escape thanks to insubordination from Benbow's captains. Du Casse wrote a letter to Benbow following the engagement:

Sir,
I had little hopes on Monday last but to have supped in your cabin: but it pleased God to order it otherwise. I am thankful for it. As for those cowardly captains who deserted you, hang them, for by God they deserve it.
Yours,
Du Casse

Two years later, du Casse, commanding Intrépide, fought in the vanguard of a Franco-Spanish fleet during the Battle of Málaga. In 1708, he commanded the Spanish treasure fleet during its annual voyage to Spain, suffering very few losses (a rarity at the time). For this he was awarded the Order of the Golden Fleece, the highest Spanish award possible. In the same year, du Casse also fought in Wager's Action, a British victory over a Franco-Spanish squadron.

In 1714 he commanded the French fleet during the siege of Barcelona.

=== Governorship of Saint-Domingue ===
He was governor of Saint-Domingue from 1691 to 1703. He died on 25 June 1715 in the town of Bourbon-l'Archambault.

== In popular culture ==
In the video game Assassin's Creed IV: Black Flag, Du Casse's nephew serves as one of the antagonists and the first boss. In the game, his name is Julien, and is 33 at his time of death in 1715, coincidentally the same year his uncle died as well. This character took to sea at a young age and fought alongside his real life uncle in the War for Spanish Succession, before deserting in favor of a brief tenure as a slave trader and subsequently as a mercenary prior to the game's start. He was one of the Templars in the game, while he was accompanied by Woodes Rogers and Laureano de Torres y Ayala.

== See also ==
- Du Casse, Robert Emmanuel Léon, Baron. L'Amiral Du Casse, chevalier de la toison d'or (1646-1715). Paris: 1876.
- Marley, David. Historic Cities of the Americas: An Illustrated Encyclopedia. Vols. 1–2. Santa Barbara, CA: ABC-CLIO, 2005.
- Pritchard, James. In Search of Empire: The French in the Americas, 1670-1730. Cambridge: Cambridge University Press, 2004.
- Saint-Simon, Louis de Rouvroy, Duke of. Mémoires complets et authentiques du duc de Saint-Simon. Vols. 4 and 7. Paris: Hachette, 1856–58.
