= French ship Agréable =

Ship of the line of the French Navy

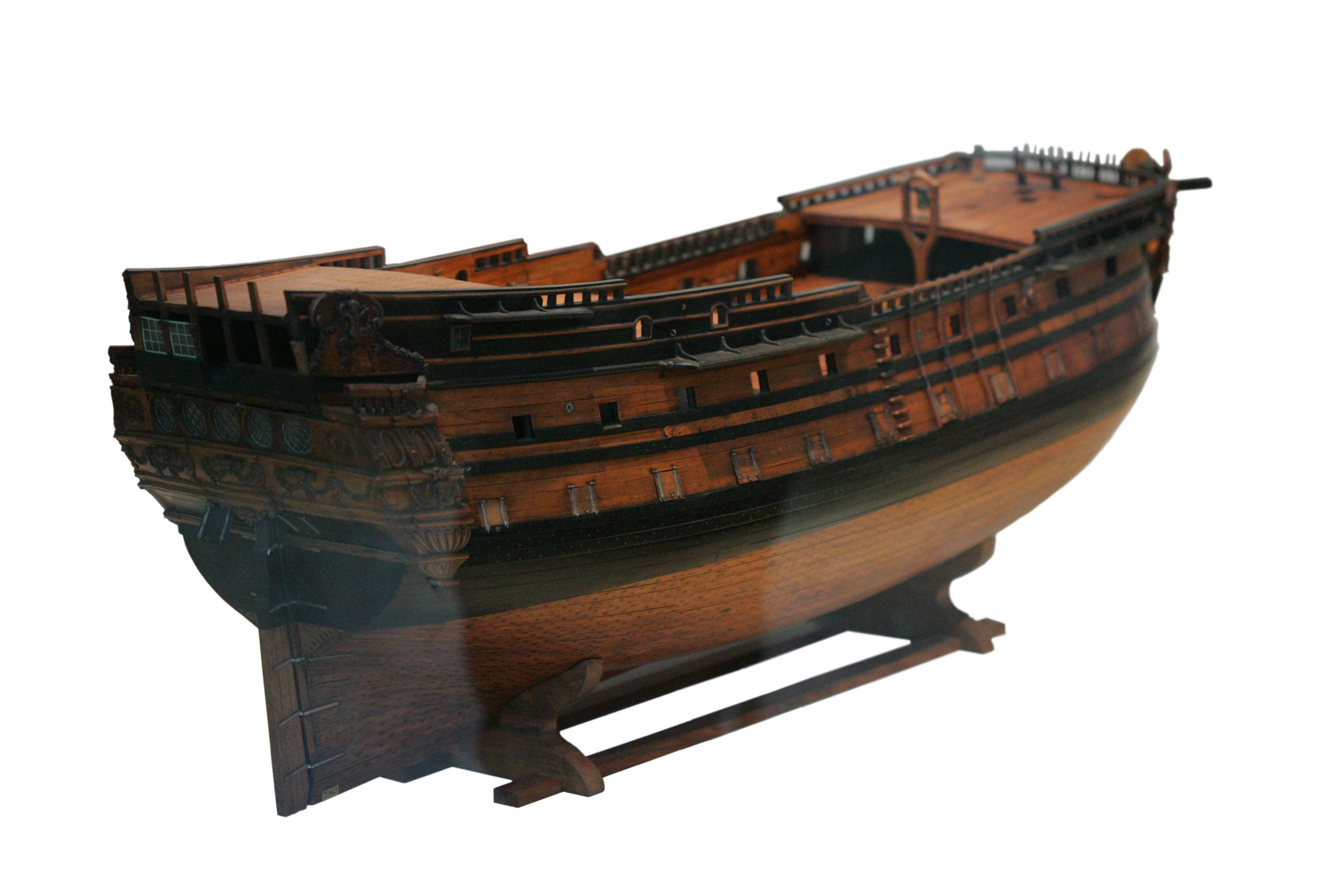
- Ship model of Agréable

History

France
- Namesake: "Pleasant"
- Builder: Toulon, under plans by Laurent Coulomb
- Laid down: as Glorieux, 1670
- Launched: 14 June 1671
- Renamed: Agréable, June 1671
- Homeport: Brest
- Fate: Scrapped in 1717

General characteristics
- Class & type: 56-gun, 3rd-rank ship of the line
- Tonnage: 1000
- Length: 40 m (130 ft)
- Beam: 11.25 m (36.9 ft)
- Draught: 5.5 m (18 ft)
- Propulsion: Sail
- Complement: 300 to 400 men
- Armament: 56 guns: 22 24-pounders; 24 12-pounders; 10 6-pounders
- Armour: Timber

Agréable was a 56-gun ship of the line of the French Navy. She was laid down in 1670 as Glorieux ("Glorious") and renamed to Agréable shortly after her launching on 14 June 1671.

In 1700, she departed France for India in order to ferry a load of gold back to France. In 1701, Agréable, along with the Aurore, Mutine and Saint-Louis, were attacked off Île Bourbon. Damaged, the Agréable made repairs at Île Bourbon, where the treasure was hidden.

In 1711, Agréable was converted to a hulk, and she was eventually scrapped in 1717.
