= Saubusse =

- Commune
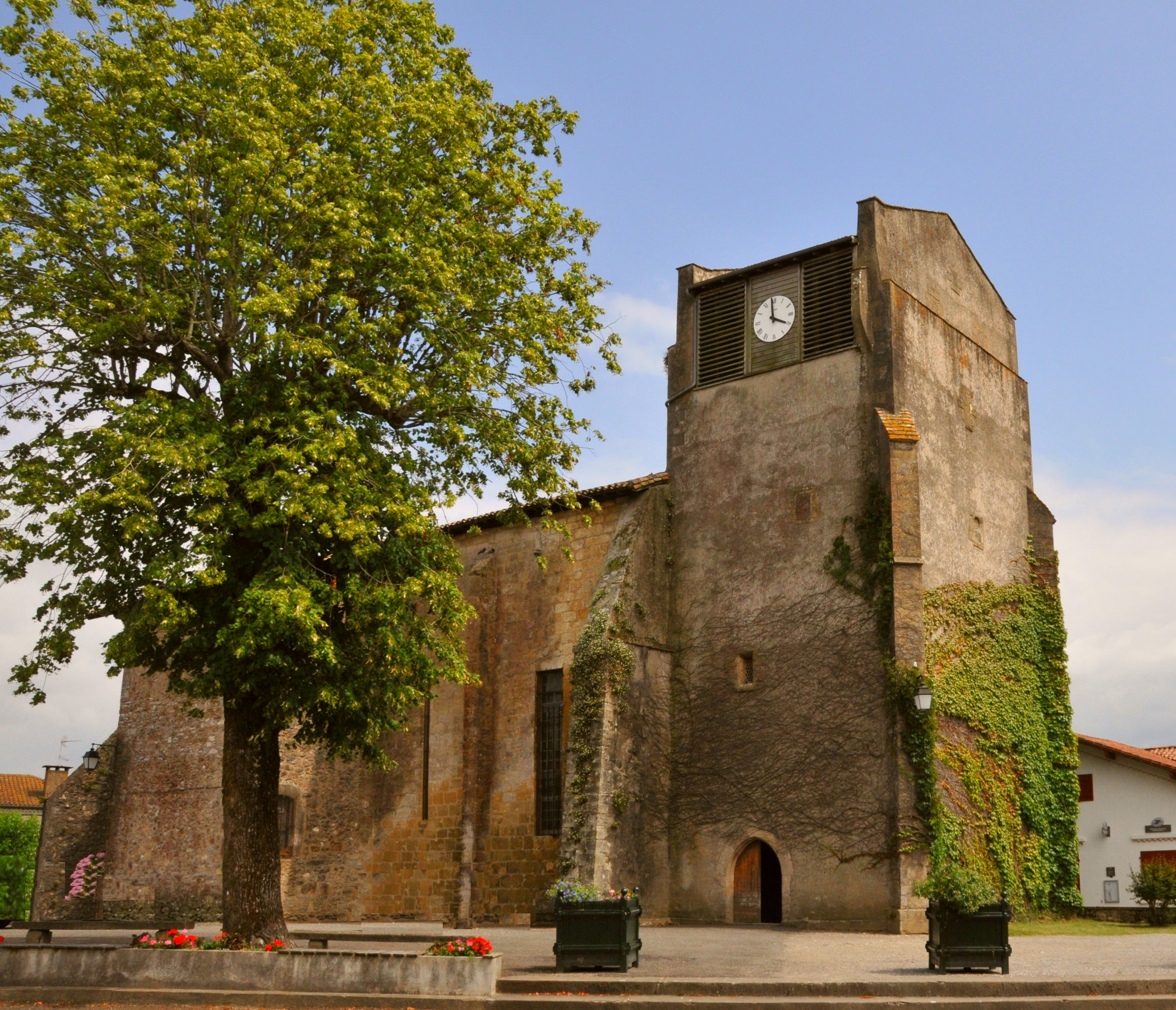
- Location of Saubusse
- Location within France Location within Nouvelle-Aquitaine
- Coordinates: 43°39′29″N 1°11′08″W
- Country: France
- Region: Nouvelle-Aquitaine
- Department: Landes
- Arrondissement: Dax
- Canton: Marensin Sud
- Intercommunality: Maremne-Adour-Côte-Sud

Government
  - Mayor (2020–2026): Eric Lahillade
- Area^{1}: 10.53 km^{2} (4.07 sq mi)
- Elevation: 10 m (33 ft)
- Highest elevation: 31 m (102 ft)
- Lowest elevation: 1 m (3.3 ft)
- Population (2023): 1,093
  - Density: 103.8/km^{2} (268.8/sq mi)
- Time zone: UTC+01:00 (CET)
  - Summer (DST): UTC+02:00 (CEST)
- INSEE/Postal code: 40293 /40180
- ^{1} French Land Register data, which excludes lakes, ponds, glaciers > 1 km^{2} (0.386 sq mi or 247 acres) and river estuaries.

Saubusse (French pronunciation: [sobys]; Occitan: Saubuça) is a commune in the Landes department in Nouvelle-Aquitaine in southwestern France.

The church of Saubusse was built in the 13th Century under the reign of Louis IX of France commonly known as Saint Louis.

== Population ==
Historical population
Year	Pop.	±% p.a.
1968	634	—
1975	616	−0.41%
1982	624	+0.18%
1990	618	−0.12%
1999	742	+2.05%
2007	780	+0.63%
2012	876	+2.35%
2017	1,120	+5.04%
2023	1,093	−0.41%
Source: INSEE

The inhabitants of the village are called "sibusates" in French.

== See also ==
- Communes of the Landes department
