= HMS Pendennis (1695) =

Ship of the line of the Royal Navy

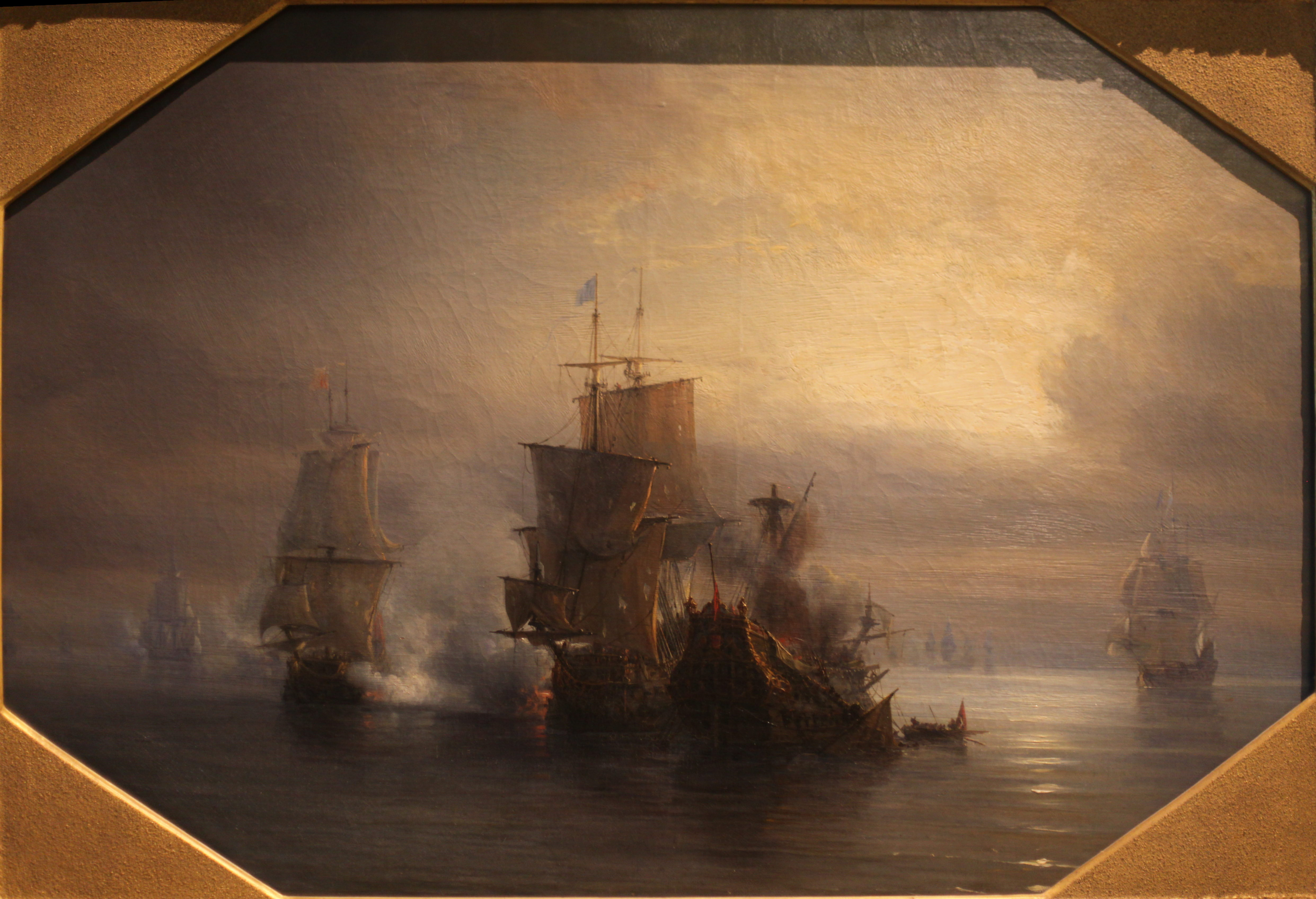
- 1839 painting of the French capturing Pendennis (second from right) by Théodore Gudin

History

England
- Name: HMS Pendennis
- Ordered: 18 November 1694
- Builder: Robert & John Castle, Deptford
- Launched: 15 October 1695
- Commissioned: 1696
- Captured: 20 October 1705

General characteristics
- Class & type: 50-gun fourth-rate ship of the line
- Tons burthen: 681 71/94
- Length: 130 ft 2.5 in (39.7 m) (gundeck); 109 ft (33.2 m) (gundeck)
- Beam: 34 ft 3.5 in (10.5 m)
- Depth of hold: 13 ft 6.5 in (4.1 m)
- Propulsion: Sails
- Sail plan: Full-rigged ship
- Armament: 50 guns: Lower gundeck 20 x 12 pdr guns; Upper gundeck 22 x demi-culverins (9 pdr guns); Quarterdeck 6 x minions (4 pdr guns); Forecastle 2 x minions (4 pdr guns)

HMS Pendennis was a 50-gun fourth-rate ship of the line of the Royal Navy, ordered on 18 November 1694 as one of two such ships (the other was the Harwich) to be built by commercial contract by Robert and John Castle at their yard at Deptford. The Pendennis was launched on 15 October 1695. Pendennis was captured by the French 50-gun ships Protée, Triton and Salisbury off the Dogger Bank on 20 October 1705 while defending a convoy; with her name altered to Pindenize, she remained in French service until sold in 1706 at Dunkirk.

== See also ==
- List of ships captured in the 18th century

== Bibliography ==
- Lavery, Brian (1983) The Ship of the Line – Volume 1: The development of the battlefleet 1650-1850. Conway Maritime Press. ISBN 0-85177-252-8.
- Winfield, Rif (1997), The 50-Gun Ship: A Complete History. Chatham Publishing (1st edition); Mercury Books (2nd edition 2005). ISBN 1-845600-09-6.
- Winfield, Rif (2009) British Warships in the Age of Sail 1603-1714: Design, Construction, Careers and Fates. Seaforth Publishing. ISBN 9781848320406.
