= HMS Breda (1692) =

Ship of the line of the Royal Navy

History

Great Britain
- Name: HMS Breda
- Ordered: 1690
- Builder: Lawrence, Woolwich Dockyard
- Launched: 23 April 1692
- Fate: Broken up, 1730
- Notes: Participated in: Battle of Cape Passaro

General characteristics
- Class & type: 70-gun third rate ship of the line
- Tons burthen: 109475/94 (bm)
- Length: 150 ft (45.7 m) (gundeck)
- Beam: 40 ft 5 in (12.3 m)
- Depth of hold: 16 ft 8 in (5.1 m)
- Propulsion: Sails
- Sail plan: Full-rigged ship
- Armament: 70 guns of various weights of shot

HMS Breda was a 70-gun third-rate ship of the line of the Royal Navy, launched at Woolwich Dockyard on 23 April 1692. She was named after the Declaration of Breda made in 1660 by Charles II of England.

In 1701, under Captain Christopher Fogg, she became the flagship of Vice-Admiral John Benbow. His squadron left for the West Indies on 2 September 1701 as the War of the Spanish Succession began.

During the action of August 1702, Breda, under Benbow's command, was one of only two ships in the squadron to effectively engage the French. After several days, the contumacy of Benbow's captains in refusing to fight, and his own injuries, forced him to return to Port Royal, where several were convicted of cowardice at a court-martial.

In 1718, Breda was commanded by Captain Barrows Harris, and took part in the Battle of Cape Passaro. During the Blockade of Porto Bello (1726–7) she served as flagship for Vice-Admiral Hosier, who died aboard her in 1727. She was broken up in 1730.
