= HMS Britannia (1682) =

Ship of the line of the Royal Navy

- Britannia shown in two positions, painting by Isaac Sailmaker

History

Great Britain
- Name: HMS Britannia
- Builder: Phineas Pett II, Chatham Dockyard
- Launched: 27 June 1682
- Fate: Broken up, 1749

General characteristics as built
- Class & type: 100-gun first rate ship of the line
- Tons burthen: 1620 70/94 (bm)
- Length: 167 ft 5 in (51.0 m) (gundeck)
- Beam: 47 ft 4 in (14.4 m)
- Depth of hold: 17 ft 2.5 in (5.2 m)
- Propulsion: Sails
- Sail plan: Full-rigged ship
- Armament: 100 guns of various weights of shot

General characteristics after 1719 rebuild
- Class & type: 100-gun first rate ship of the line
- Tons burthen: 189477/94 (bm)
- Length: 174 ft 6 in (53.2 m) (gundeck)
- Beam: 50 ft 2 in (15.3 m)
- Depth of hold: 20 ft 1 in (6.1 m)
- Propulsion: Sails
- Sail plan: Full-rigged ship
- Armament: 100 guns of various weights of shot

HMS Britannia was a 100-gun first-rate ship of the line of the Royal Navy. She was built by Phineas Pett II at Chatham Dockyard and launched on 27 June 1682. Britannia was built under the "thirty ship program" that was authorised by parliament on 23 February 1677. On commissioning, she was found to be unstable due to insufficient draught. The remedial process of girdling was immediately applied. This involves applying an extra layer of planking below the waterline to increase the beam. Nevertheless, her performance remained unsatisfactory for the rest of her life.

On 19 May 1692 she was the allied fleet flagship at the Battle of Barfleur.

In 1705 she took on board Charles III of Spain, when on her way to Catalonia

In 1715, Britannia was ordered to be taken to pieces and rebuilt at Woolwich Dockyard, from where she relaunched on 30 October 1719, again as a 100-gun first rate.

Britannia was placed on harbour service in 1745, and was broken up in 1749.

She was captained from 1734 to 1736 by Sir Tancred Robinson.
