= HMS Southampton (1693) =

Ship of the line of the Royal Navy

History

Great Britain
- Name: HMS Southampton
- Ordered: 13 July 1692
- Builder: John Winter, Southampton
- Launched: 10 June 1693
- Fate: Broken up, 1771

General characteristics as built
- Class & type: 50-gun fourth rate ship of the line
- Tons burthen: 608 83/94 bm
- Length: 121 ft 9 in (37.1 m) (gundeck) 100 ft (30.5 m) (keel
- Beam: 33 ft 10 in (10.3 m)
- Depth of hold: 13 ft 9 in (4.2 m)
- Propulsion: Sails
- Sail plan: Full-rigged ship
- Armament: 50 guns: Gundeck: 20 × 12 pdrs; Upper gundeck: 22 × 9 pdrs (demi-culverins); Quarterdeck: 6 × 4 pdrs (minions); Forecastle: 2 × 4 pdrs (minions)

General characteristics after 1700 rebuild
- Class & type: 54-gun fourth rate ship of the line
- Tons burthen: 635 88/94 bm
- Length: 122 ft 3 in (37.3 m) (gundeck) 102 ft 2 in (31.1 m) (keel)
- Beam: 34 ft 2.5 in (10.4 m)
- Depth of hold: 13 ft 2 in (4.0 m)
- Propulsion: Sails
- Sail plan: Full-rigged ship
- Armament: 54 guns of various weights of shot

HMS Southampton was a 50-gun fourth rate ship of the line of the Royal Navy, ordered to be built by commercial contract by John Winter at Chapel, Southampton (ordered on the same day as the similar Portland from Woolwich Dockyard). The Southampton was launched on 10 June 1693.

On 29 April 1699 she was ordered to be taken apart at Deptford Dockyard to be rebuilt, and was re-launched there in 1700 as a fourth rate of 54 guns (reduced to 46 guns during peacetime). The Southampton was refitted and re-classed as a 40-gun Fifth Rate in 1716, had a large repair at Chatham Dockyard from 1722 to 1724, was removed from service and hulked at Port Antonio (Jamaica) in 1728, and continued in this role until 1771, when she was broken up.
