= English ship Bristol (1653) =

Ship of the line of the Royal Navy

History

Commonwealth of England
- Name: Bristol
- Namesake: Bristol
- Ordered: 27 February 1652
- Builder: Portsmouth Dockyard
- Launched: 1653
- Commissioned: 1653
- Honours and awards: Santa Cruz 1657

History

Kingdom of England
- Name: Bristol
- Acquired: May 1660
- Honours and awards: Lowestoft 1665; Four Days' Battle 1666; Orfordness 1666; Solebay 1672; Tesel 1673

Great Britain
- Name: Bristol
- Acquired: 1707 Act of Union
- Captured: 24 April 1709
- Fate: Captured by two French ships

Kingdom of France
- Acquired: 12 April 1709
- Captured: 25 April 1709, by the Royal Navy
- Fate: Foundered

General characteristics as built
- Class & type: 44-gun Fourth-rate
- Tons burthen: 534 45/94 tons bm
- Length: 104 ft (31.7 m) gundeck; 104 ft (31.7 m) Keel for tonnage
- Beam: 31 ft 1 in (9.5 m)
- Draught: 15 ft 8 in (4.8 m)
- Depth of hold: 13 ft 0 in (4.0 m)
- Sail plan: ship-rigged
- Complement: 200 personnel in 1653; 150 personnel in 1660; 200 personnel in 1666; 230/200/150 personnel as per establishment
- Armament: 50 guns 1653; 44 guns 1660; 1666 Establishment; 26 × culverins; 22 × demi-culverins; 4 × sakers

General characteristics after 1693 rebuild
- Class & type: 50-gun fourth-rate
- Tons burthen: 489 0/94 tons bm
- Length: 130 ft (39.6 m) (gundeck)
- Beam: 35 ft 2 in (10.7 m)
- Depth of hold: 13 ft (4.0 m)
- Sail plan: ship-rigged
- Complement: 280/230/150 personnel
- Armament: 38 guns 1696 survey; 18 × culverins (LD); 20 × 8-pounder guns (UD); 1703 Establishment; 22/20 × 12-pounder guns (LD); 22/18 × 6-pounder guns (UD); 8/6 × 6-pounder guns (QD); 2 × 6-pounder guns (Fc)

Bristol was a 44-gun fourth rate vessel of the Commonwealth of England built under the 1651 Programme. She arrived too late for the First Anglo-Dutch War, but was an active participant in the Second and Third Anglo-Dutch Wars. In the Third, she was no longer used as a line-of battle vessel and reverted to a role of cruising against privateers. She was lost in this role in the English Channel when she was captured by the French. Two weeks later she was recaptured by the English and sank in 1709.

Bristol was the first vessel to carry the name in the English and Royal Navy.

== Construction and specifications ==
She was ordered by Parliament on 27 February 1652 to be built at Portsmouth Dockyard under the guidance of Master Shipwright John Tippetts. Her dimensions were gundeck 130 feet 0 inches (39.6 metres) with 104 feet 0 inches (31.7 metres) keel for tonnage with a breadth of 31 feet 1 inch (9.5 metres) and a depth of hold of 13 feet 0 inches (4.0 metres). Her builder's measure tonnage was calculated as 534 45/94 tons. Her draught was 15 feet 0 inches (4.6 metres). Her measurements were later recorded as gundeck 130 feet 0 inches (39.6 metres) with 109 feet 0 inches (33.2 metres) keel for tonnage with a breadth of 34 feet 0 inches (10.4 metres) and a depth of hold of 13 feet 6 inches (4.1 metres). Her builder's measure tonnage was 670 tons.

Her gun armament in 1653 was 50 guns and by 1660 it was down to 40 guns. Under the 1666 Establishment her armament was nominally set at 50 guns consisting of twenty-six culverins, (Note: The culverin was a gun of 4,500 pounds with a 5.5-inch bore firing a 17.5-pound shot with a twelve-pound powder charge) twenty-two demi-culverins, (Note: The demi-culverin was a gun of 3,400 pounds with a four-inch bore firing a 9.5-pound shot with an eight-pound powder charge) four sakers. (Note: The sacar or saker was a gun of 1,400 pounds with a 3.5-inch bore firing a 5.5-pound shot with a 5.5-pound powder charge) She actually carried 48 guns consisting of twenty-four culverins, twenty-two demi-culverines and two sakers. The 1677 establishment set her guns at 48 wartime and 42 peacetime consisting of twenty-two culverins, twenty 8-pounder guns and six sakers. By 1685 her guns were set at 48 guns consisting of twenty-two 12-pounder guns, twenty-two 8-pounder guns and four 3-pounder guns. Her manning was 200 personnel in 1653, then down to 150 personnel in 1660 and back up to 200 in 1666. It was later established at 230/200/150 personnel based on the amount of weaponry carried.

== Commissioned service ==
=== Service with the Commonwealth Navy ===
Bristol was commissioned in 1653 under the command of Rodger Martin for service in the Western Approaches during the winter of 1653/54. In 1654 she was under Captain Robert Clarke. Captain Thomas Penrose took over in 1656 followed by Captain Henry Fenn until 1658. She was with Robert Blake's Fleet at the Battle of Santa Cruz on 20 April 1657. In 1659 Captain George Dawkins took command with Doakes Squadron in the Mediterranean. In 1660 she was under Captain Fenn once more.

=== Service after the Restoration May 1660 ===
With Captain Fenn she was in the Downs in June 1660. On 16 December 1663 she was under command of Captain Sir William Berkeley (until 14 August 1664) with Lawson's Squadron in the Mediterranean. On 15 August 1664 Captain Sir John Chicheley took over command until 15 September when Captain Berkeley resumed his command until 12 November 1664. Captain John Hart assumed command on 13 November 1664. She participated in the Battle of Lowestoft as a member of Red Squadron, Van Division on 3 June 1665. On 17 September 1665 Captain Philemon Bacon assumed command. She was, as a member of Red Squadron, Rear Division at the Four Days' Battle from 1 to 4 June 1666. Captain Bacon was killed on the second day plus she lost 12 killed and 58 wounded over the course of the action. On 7 June 1666 Captain Sir John Holmes took command until 17 October 1667. She partook in the St James Day Battle as a member of Red Squadron on 25 July 1666. On 24 March 1668 she was under Captain Daniel Healing (until 31 December 1669) with Sir Thomas Allin's Squadron in the Mediterranean.

On 12 January 1670 she was under the command of Captain Holmes once more until 16 December 1670. On 29 January 1672 Captain Charles Wilde took command. As a member of Red Squadron she was at the Battle of Solebay on 28 May 1672. She was in action again off Heligoland on 22 July 1672. In 1673 she was the command of Captain Erik Sjoblad for the escort of a Mediterranean convoy. She participated in the Battle of Texel on 11 August 1673. She escorted a convoy to the Canary Islands in October 1673. Captain William Harman was her commander in 1674. He was followed by Captain Captain Sir John Berry for service at Newfoundland, then to the Straits of Gibraltar and finally to America. In 1677 Captain Henry Killigrew took over command. In March 1678 it was Captain Anthony Langston who had command for service in the English Channel followed by a stint in the Mediterranean. On 16 January 1679 Captain Sir John Strickland took command and sailed to the Mediterranean as a Rear-Admiral.

In 1680 Bristol was under the command of Captain Arthur Herbert for service in the Mediterranean. During March or April while under command of Captain John Wyborn, she destroyed the Algerine 32-gun Citron Tree. In May 1682 she was under Captain John Nevill. Captain Strickland resumed command on 27 April 1685 for a convoy to Turkey, followed by service in the English Channel during 1686/87 culminating with providing an escort for the Queen of Portugal in 1687. She was under the command of Captain Thomas Leighton sailing with Dartmouth's Fleet in October 1688.On 22 December 1688 she was under Captain John Granville, then in June 1689 Captain Henry Houghton for the West Indies in 1690/91. She was ordered rebuilt at Deptford in 1693.

=== Rebuild at Deptford 1693 ===
She was ordered rebuilt under contract by Robert & John Castle of Deptford. Her dimensions after rebuilding were gundeck 130 feet 0 inches (39.6 metres) with 1.7 feet 6.5 inches (0.7 metres) keel for tonnage with a breadth of 34 feet 3.25 inches (10.4 metres) and a depth of hold of 13 feet 1.25 inches (4.0 metres). Her builder's measure tonnage was calculated as 671 64/94 tons.

Her gun armament in the 1695 survey was 38 guns. This consisted of eighteen culverins and twenty 8-pounder guns. The 1703 established armament was 54 wartime/46 peacetime guns consisting of twenty-two/twenty 12-pounder guns of 9-foot length on the lower deck (LD), twenty-two/eighteen 6-pounder guns of 8.5-foot length on the upper deck (UD), eight/six 6-pounder guns of 7 feet on the quarterdeck (QD) and two 6-pounder guns of 9.5 feet in length on the foc's'le (Fc). Her manning was established at 280/240/150 personnel.

=== Service after Rebuild 1693 ===
She was commissioned in August 1693 under the command of Captain Edward Gurney for service in the West Indies where Captain Gurney would die on 29 January 1695. In early 1696 Captain Edmund D'Oyley (alt spelling Doyley) took command at Barbados. In1697 Captain Stephen Elliot was her commander with Mee's Squadron in the West Indies. She sailed for Home Waters in 1698. She became the Guardship at Portsmouth until she was paid off into Ordinary. She was recommissioned in 1701 under Edward Acton to proceed to the West Indies at the end of 1701. She returned in early 1703 as her crew wat at the execution of Captains Kirby and Captain Wade at Plymouth on 16 April 1703. In 1704 Captain John Watkins took command, then Captain John Anderson, who was dismissed by court-martial both for the West Indies. In November 1705 she was under the command of Captain Thomas Mann. She sailed for Home Waters in July 1706 under the temporary command of a lieutenant. Captain Henry Gore was her commander sailing with Whetstone's Squadron in 1707. In 1708 she escorted a convoy to Virginia.

== Loss ==
On 24 April 1709 she was captured by the French 66-gun L'Acille and the 40-gun La Gloire of Duguay-Trouin's Squadron off Plymouth. She was retaken the following day and foundered in the English Channel.
