= HMS Windsor (1695) =

Ship of the line of the Royal Navy

History

Great Britain
- Name: HMS Windsor
- Builder: Snelgrove, Deptford
- Launched: 31 October 1695
- Honours and awards: Second Battle of Cape Finisterre, 1747
- Fate: Broken up, 1777

General characteristics as built
- Class & type: 60-gun fourth rate ship of the line
- Tons burthen: 910 bm
- Length: 146 ft 2.5 in (44.6 m) (gundeck)
- Beam: 37 ft 9 in (11.5 m)
- Depth of hold: 15 ft 8.5 in (4.8 m)
- Propulsion: Sails
- Sail plan: Full-rigged ship
- Armament: 60 guns of various weights of shot

General characteristics after 1729 rebuild
- Class & type: 1719 Establishment 60-gun fourth rate ship of the line
- Tons burthen: 951 bm
- Length: 144 ft (43.9 m) (gundeck)
- Beam: 39 ft (11.9 m)
- Depth of hold: 16 ft 5 in (5.0 m)
- Propulsion: Sails
- Sail plan: Full-rigged ship
- Armament: 60 guns: Gundeck: 24 × 24 pdrs; Upper gundeck: 26 × 9 pdrs; Quarterdeck: 8 × 6 pdrs; Forecastle: 2 × 6 pdrs

General characteristics after 1745 rebuild
- Class & type: 58-gun fourth rate ship of the line
- Tons burthen: 1201 bm
- Length: 152 ft (46.3 m) (gundeck)
- Beam: 42 ft (12.8 m)
- Depth of hold: 17 ft 10 in (5.4 m)
- Propulsion: Sails
- Sail plan: Full-rigged ship
- Armament: 58 guns: Gundeck: 24 × 24 pdrs; Upper gundeck: 24 × 12 pdrs; Quarterdeck: 8 × 6 pdrs; Forecastle: 2 × 6 pdrs

HMS Windsor was a 60-gun fourth-rate ship of the line of the Royal Navy launched at Deptford Dockyard on 31 October 1695.

On 18 November 1725 she was ordered to be taken to pieces and rebuilt according to the 1719 Establishment at Deptford, and she was relaunched on 27 October 1729. On 1 November 1742 an order was made out for Windsor to be taken to pieces once more, and rebuilt at Woolwich Dockyard as a 58-gun fourth rate. Unusually, she was not reconstructed according to the establishment of dimensions in effect at the time (the 1741 proposals of the 1719 Establishment), being made 5 ft (1.5 m) longer on the gundeck, 7 ft (2.1 m) longer on the keel, though with the same beam and 3 in (0.1 m) less depth to her hold than the standard 58s, and she was relaunched on 26 February 1745.

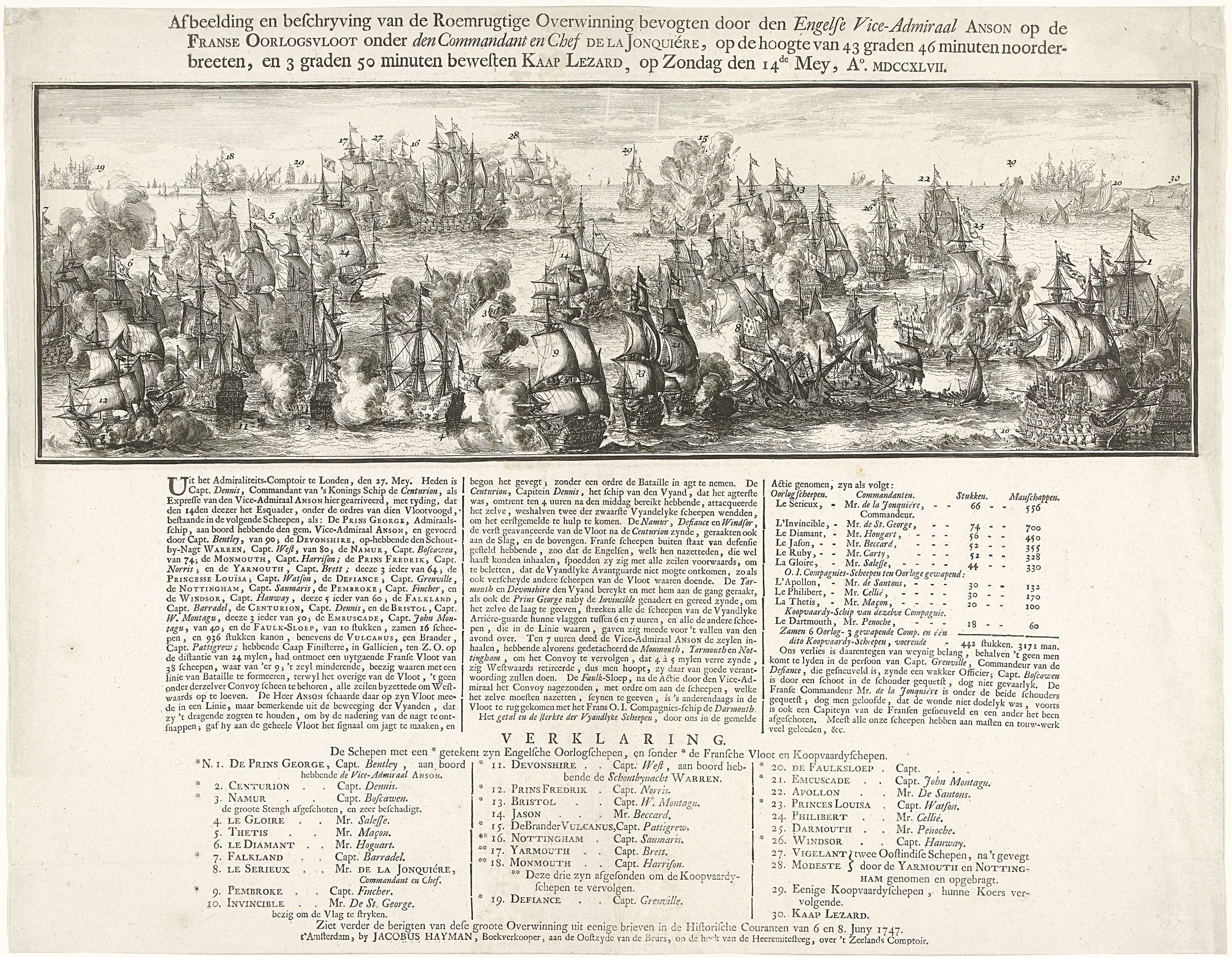
Windsor shown here at the First Battle of Cape Finisterre (1747)

Windsor remained in service until 1777, when she was broken up.
