= Charles Hardy (Royal Navy officer, died 1744) =

Royal Navy officer

Vice-Admiral Sir Charles Hardy
- Born: c.1680 Guernsey
- Died: 27 November 1744; The Admiralty, London, England
- Spouse: Elizabeth Burchett (m. 1715–1744)
- Military career
- Allegiance: Kingdom of Great Britain
- Branch: Royal Navy
- Service years: 1695–1744
- Rank: Vice-Admiral
- Commands: HMS Weazel; HMS Swift; HMS Dunwich; HMS Nonsuch; HMS Weymouth; HMS Guernsey; HMS Defiance; HMS Grafton; HMS Kent; HMS Stirling Castle; HMY Carolina; Lord of the Admiralty
- Conflicts: War of the Spanish Succession; Great Northern War; Anglo-Spanish War; Thirteenth siege of Gibraltar; War of the Austrian Succession; King George's War; Planned French invasion of Britain
- Awards: Knight Bachelor
- Other work: Member of Parliament for Portsmouth

Vice-Admiral Sir Charles Hardy (c.1680 – 27 November 1744), also known as Charles Hardy the Elder, was a Royal Navy officer of the eighteenth century. Hardy entered the Royal Navy in 1695, joining his cousin Captain Thomas Hardy's ship HMS Pendennis. Promoted to lieutenant in 1701, he served in several ships of the line before being promoted to commander in 1705. Hardy commanded sloops in the English Channel, Mediterranean and North Seas, before taking command of HMS Dunwich in 1709, in which he was promoted to post captain. Hardy subsequently served for a year at Jamaica before commanding two ships during the Great Northern War between 1718 and 1720. Having changed commands several times, in 1727 he fought at the thirteenth siege of Gibraltar in HMS Kent.

Hardy commanded the royal yacht HMY Carolina between 1730 and 1742, being knighted in 1732. In 1742 he was promoted to rear-admiral, advancing to vice-admiral in December 1743. Also in that month he became a Lord of the Admiralty, Member of Parliament for Portsmouth, and second-in-command of the Channel Fleet. In the Channel Fleet Hardy participated in the manoeuvres that halted the planned French invasion of Britain, and at the start of King George's War was sent with a squadron to escort transports to the Mediterranean Fleet. Having completed this in May 1744 he returned to England, losing one of his squadron in the action of 8 May 1744. He returned to the Admiralty, where he died on 27 December.

== Naval service ==
=== Early service ===
Charles Hardy was born at Guernsey in around 1680, the son of Philip Le Hardy (died 1705), commissioner of garrisons on Guernsey, and Marie née Le Filleul. His paternal grandfather, John Le Hardy, was solicitor general of Jersey, and he was a cousin of the future Rear-Admiral Sir Thomas Hardy. (Note: Hardy has been mistakenly labelled as the son of Sir Thomas Hardy in some works.) On 30 September 1695 Charles followed Thomas into the Royal Navy. He joined the ship commanded by Thomas, the 50-gun fourth-rate HMS Pendennis, as a volunteer. After serving on the 32-gun frigates HMS Portsmouth and HMS Sheerness, Hardy was promoted to lieutenant on 28 February 1701.

In this rank Hardy was appointed third lieutenant of the 70-gun ship of the line HMS Resolution, which was under the command of Captain Basil Beaumont. In December 1702 Hardy moved to the 50-gun fourth-rate HMS Weymouth for two years, the latter spent in the North Sea. He transferred to the guardship HMS Royal Ann in December 1704, serving for some time in the English Channel, before being promoted to commander on 27 November 1705. Hardy's first command was the 10-gun sloop HMS Weazel on fishery protection duties in the English Channel, which he commanded until September 1706 when he was moved into the 10-gun sloop HMS Swift by Vice-Admiral Sir John Leake.

=== Captain ===
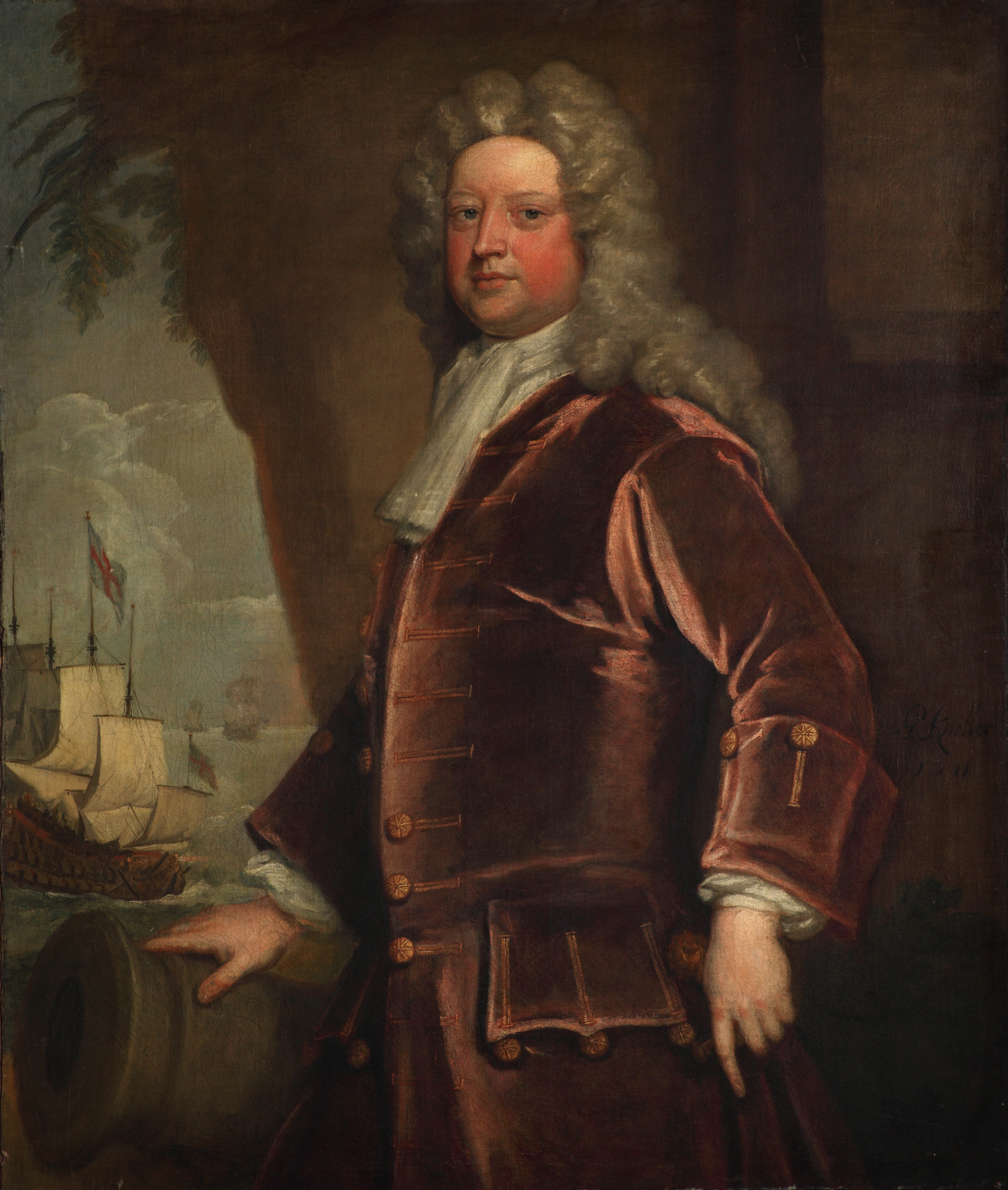
Admiral Sir John Norris, under whom Hardy frequently served

Hardy started his command of Swift in the Mediterranean Sea, before moving to the North Sea in the winter of 1706. He continued in command of the sloop until 14 January 1709 when he was given command of the 20-gun frigate HMS Dunwich, in which he was promoted to post-captain on 28 June 1709. Stationed in the North Sea, Dunwich operated as an escort to convoys sailing off the east coast of England. Hardy was not onboard Dunwich on 24 August when the ship captured the French privateer Le Chasseur, but had returned to command by February 1710 when Dunwich captured a 10-gun privateer that had been attacking coastal shipping. Having left Dunwich, he was appointed to command the 50-gun fourth-rate HMS Nonsuch later in 1710, sailing to Jamaica as part of the fleet of Commodore James Littleton. He returned to British waters in the following year and captured the French privateer La Trompeuse on 8 June. He left the ship before the end of 1711.

Hardy was then given command of Weymouth, in which he had previously served. He left Weymouth, which had been undergoing a refit at Plymouth Dockyard throughout his period in command, in 1715. Hardy was given his next ship in 1718, the newly rebuilt 50-gun fourth-rate HMS Guernsey. In that ship he served in the Baltic Fleet of Admiral Sir John Norris, supporting Denmark against Sweden in the Great Northern War. The fleet returned to England in 1719, with Hardy translated into the 60-gun fourth-rate HMS Defiance. In 1720 the fleet returned to the Baltic, and Hardy continued in Defiance until the end of the year when Norris' fleet returned to England again.

Hardy became an Elder Brother of Trinity House in 1722. He received his next command, the 70-gun ship of the line HMS Grafton, in January 1726. He stayed in Grafton only briefly, possibly because of an illness, and in May was instead given command of the 70-gun ship of the line HMS Kent. Kent initially joined Admiral Sir John Jennings' fleet which sailed to the Straits of Gibraltar in October. Hardy afterwards joined Vice-Admiral Sir Charles Wager's fleet off the coast of Spain. With Wager he participated in the thirteenth siege of Gibraltar in early 1727, the Anglo-Spanish War having begun, with Wager using Kent as his flagship for part of this period. In November Wager moved Hardy from Kent into the 70-gun ship of the line HMS Stirling Castle in which he continued in the Mediterranean.

The naval historian John Charnock wrote disparagingly of this period of Hardy's service, saying that "the events of this expedition were almost too uninteresting to require any particular detail...a dull routine of cruises undistinguished by any event so memorable as to be worth relating". The author John Campbell also noted that "the events of this expedition were unimportant". Hardy returned to England with Wager in April 1728.

=== Lord of the Admiralty ===
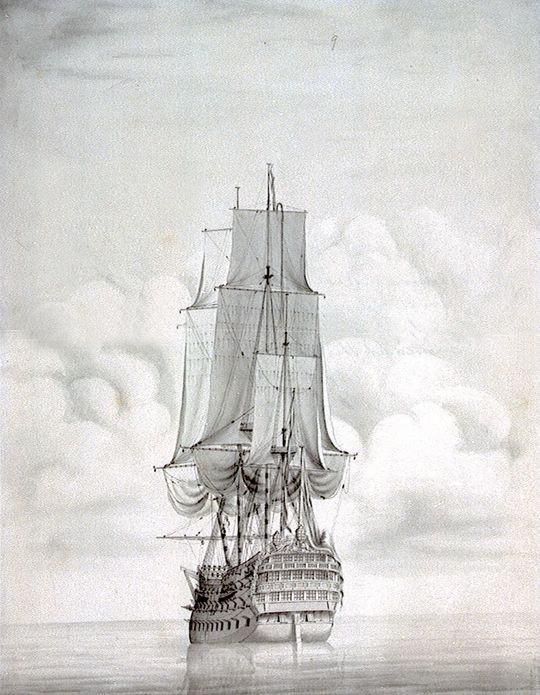
HMS Duke, which served as Hardy's flagship in 1743

On 9 February 1730 Hardy was appointed to command the royal yacht HMY Carolina and was knighted on 26 September 1732 in reward for his long naval service. He stayed in Carolina, which had been rebuilt as Royal Caroline in 1733, until he was promoted to rear-admiral on 6 April 1742. He was then promoted to vice-admiral on 7 December 1743 (Note: Full dates of promotion: rear-admiral of the blue 10 April 1742, vice-admiral of the blue 7 December 1743, vice-admiral of the red 23 June 1744.) and elected to serve as the Member of Parliament (MP) for Portsmouth on 14 December. The constituency was traditionally a naval one, controlled by the Admiralty. On 13 December Hardy was also appointed to serve as a Lord of the Admiralty, replacing Admiral Philip Cavendish who had died in the previous year. It was expected that one of the Lords should always be an active flag officer, and Hardy was brought in to fill that role.

=== Channel Fleet ===
In December 1743 Hardy hoisted his flag on board the 90-gun ship of the line HMS Duke in the Channel Fleet. He served as second-in-command to Admiral Norris, with the fleet consisting of twenty-five ships of the line and twenty-four frigates and other craft. The fleet sailed off the Downs looking for the French fleet of Lieutenant-General Jacques Aymar de Roquefeuil et du Bousquet, which the English thought might attempt to sail to Dunkirk to escort a waiting army in the planned French invasion of Britain. The two fleets almost met off Dungeness on 24 February 1744 but de Roquefeuil retreated and Norris was unable to chase him because of deteriorating sea conditions. Norris then sent his three-decked ships of the line into Spithead under the command of Hardy, so that the large ships would be protected from the weather. War was officially declared on Britain by France on 20 March, beginning King George's War. Soon after this Hardy commanded a detached squadron of eleven ships of the line serving as an escort for storeships sent to restock the Mediterranean Fleet. Hardy had as his flagship the 90-gun ship of the line HMS Saint George. (Note: Hardy's squadron was as follows: The 90-gun HMS Saint George (Hardy's flagship), 90-gun HMS Sandwich (Rear-Admiral William Martin's flagship), 100-gun HMS Victory, 90-gun HMS Duke, 90-gun HMS Princess Royal, 80-gun HMS Princess Amelia, 80-gun HMS Cornwall, 80-gun HMS Shrewsbury, 70-gun HMS Northumberland, 70-gun HMS Monmouth, 70-gun HMS Captain, 60-gun HMS Princess Mary, 60-gun HMS Dreadnought, 40-gun HMS Torrington, 14-gun HMS Grenado and 14-gun HMS Grampus.)

Hardy sailed with his squadron in late April. At the same time the Spanish were expecting a valuable convoy from Havana, and in order to safeguard this and possibly catch Hardy, the French Toulon Squadron was put to sea to join with the French at Cádiz and Spanish at Cartagena. The French, however, only left Toulon on 20 September, and Hardy entered Lisbon on 3 May to ensure the safety of his ships. While making his voyage, two ships of his squadron, the 60-gun fourth-rate HMS Dreadnought and 14-gun sloop HMS Grampus, captured the French 26-gun frigate Médée on 27 April. At Lisbon Hardy left the convoy, which was expected to make its way to Gibraltar in sections. (Note: The merchant ships Hardy had left were forced to stay for a while because the winds were against them. While held up there the French discovered their location and sent a force from Brest to blockade them. Admiral Sir John Balchen broke the blockade with a large fleet on 28 July.)

=== Return from Lisbon ===
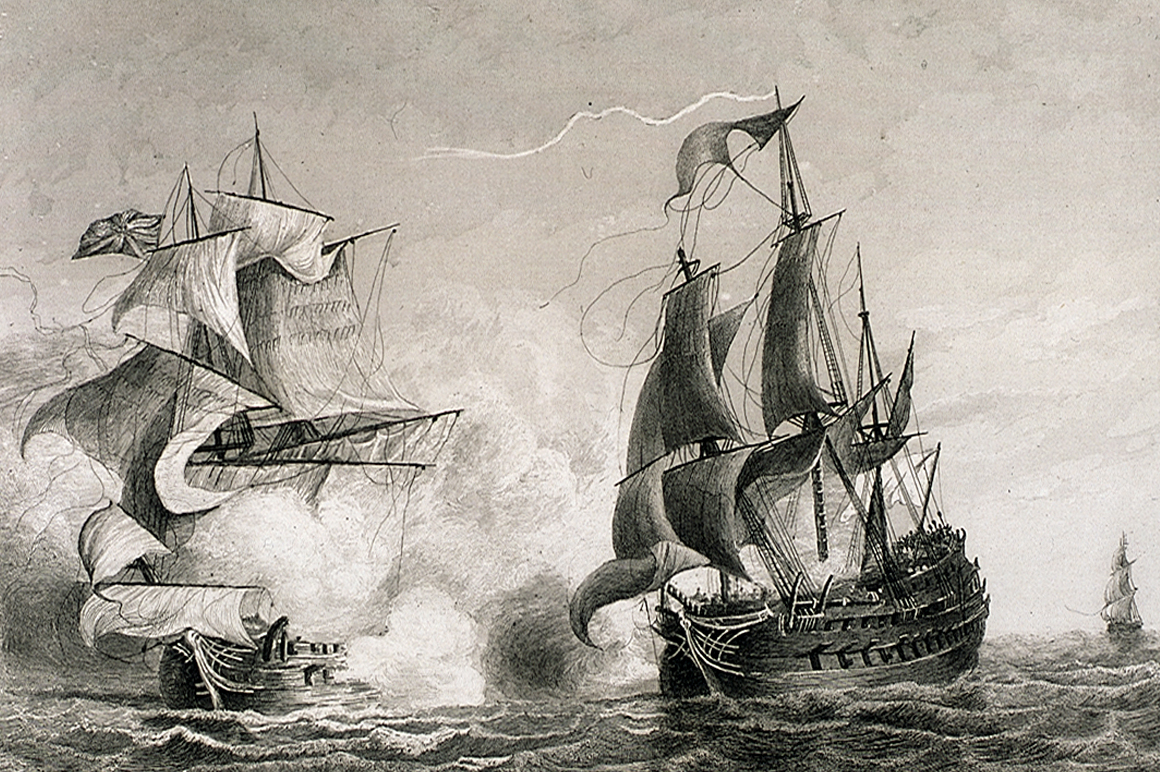
The action of 8 May 1744, at which Hardy lost one of his warships

Hardy set sail for England, and on 8 May lost one of his warships, the 70-gun ship of the line HMS Northumberland, in the action of 8 May 1744. Hardy had detached Northumberland from the squadron to investigate a strange sail, but when the weather worsened he ordered the ship to return to him. Captain Thomas Watson of Northumberland was however suffering from a fractured skull, and was drunk because of this. He continued on and discovered that the strange sail was actually two French 64-gun ships of the line and a 26-gun frigate. Northumberland attacked all three warships, and with Watson killed early on in the action the ship was quickly captured. Hardy reached England with the rest of his squadron on 20 May. He then relinquished command of his squadron and left Saint George later in the month, returning to his seat in the Admiralty. He died in his house there on 27 November.

== Family ==
Hardy married Elizabeth Burchett, the only daughter of the Secretary of the Admiralty Josiah Burchett, in around 1715. Together the couple had three sons and three daughters before Elizabeth's death some time before 1744. Their children included:

- Josiah Hardy (c.1715–1790), Governor of New Jersey
- Admiral Sir Charles Hardy (c.1714–19 May 1780), Royal Navy officer
- Rear-Admiral John Hardy (died April 1796), Royal Navy officer

== Notes and citations ==
=== Citations ===
Parliament of Great Britain
Preceded by Philip Cavendish; Martin Bladen	Member of Parliament for Portsmouth; 1743–1744; With: Martin Bladen	Succeeded by Isaac Townsend; Martin Bladen
