= Northumberland (disambiguation) =

Northumberland is a ceremonial county and unitary authority area in North East England.

Northumberland may also refer to:

== Place names ==
=== Australia ===
- Northumberland County, New South Wales

=== Canada ===
- Northumberland County, Ontario
- Northumberland County, New Brunswick
- Northumberland (Ontario federal electoral district), a former federal electoral district
- Northumberland (Ontario provincial electoral district), a former provincial electoral district in Ontario
- Northumberland (New Brunswick federal electoral district), a former federal electoral district
- Northumberland (New Brunswick provincial electoral district), a former provincial electoral district in New Brunswick

=== United Kingdom ===
- Northumberland (UK Parliament constituency), a former constituency

=== United States ===
- Northumberland, New Hampshire
- Northumberland, New York
- Northumberland, Pennsylvania

=== Islands ===
- Northumberland Island (Kiatak), in northwest Greenland

== People ==
- Duke of Northumberland
- Earl of Northumberland

== Armed forces ==
- Northumberland Hussars
- Royal Northumberland Fusiliers

== Ships ==
- HMS Northumberland, several ships of the Royal Navy
- French ship Northumberland, several ships of the French Navy
- Northumberland (ship), several ships

== Sports ==
- Northumberland County Cricket Club

== Other uses ==
- Northumberland Apartments, Washington, D.C.

== See also ==
- Northumberland County (disambiguation)
- Northumberland Park (disambiguation)
- Northumbria (disambiguation)
