= John Balchen =

Royal Navy officer

Admiral Sir John Balchen
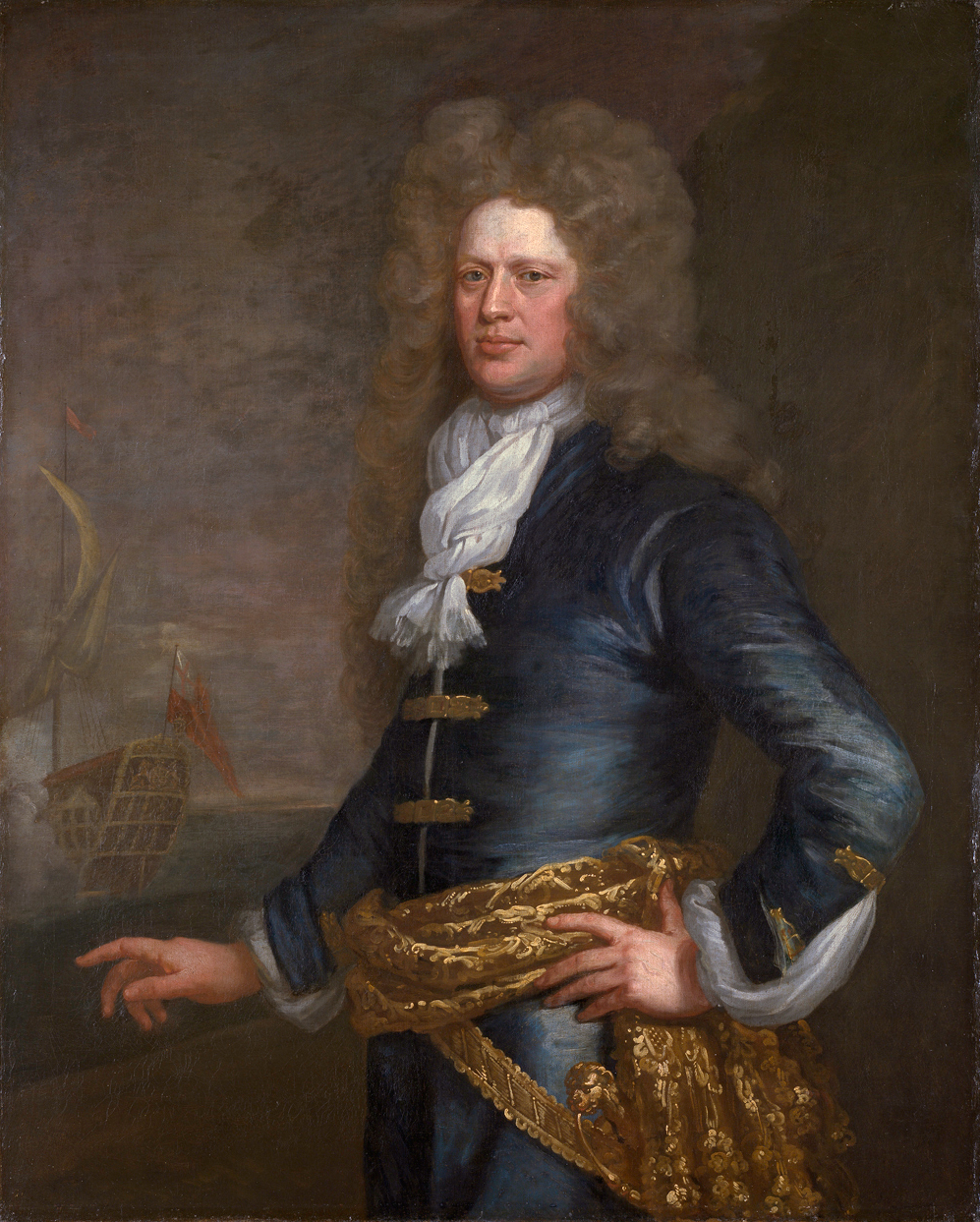
- Portrait by Jonathan Richardson the Elder, c. 1695
- Born: 2 February 1670; Godalming, Surrey
- Died: 4 October 1744 (aged 74); Casquets, Channel Islands
- Military career
- Allegiance: England; Great Britain
- Branch: Royal Navy
- Service years: 1685–1744
- Rank: Admiral of the White
- Commands: Greenwich Naval Hospital
- Conflicts: Nine Years' War; War of the Spanish Succession • Battle of Vigo Bay • Battle at the Lizard • Defence of HMS Gloucester; War of the Quadruple Alliance • Battle of Cape Passaro; War of the Austrian Succession • Wreck of HMS Victory
- Awards: Knighthood

Admiral of the White Sir John Balchen (2 February 1670 – 4 October 1744) was a Royal Navy officer with a long and distinguished career during the late 17th and early 18th centuries. In the course of his service at sea, Balchen saw action in numerous battles against the French and Spanish navies across 60 years and three separate wars. He was twice captured by the French in action, both times being exonerated and commended for the defence of his ships against overwhelming odds.

Balchen died in the shipwreck of the 100-gun first-rate HMS Victory off the Casquets in the Channel Islands during operations to deter French blockading of Spanish and Portuguese ports during the War of the Austrian Succession. A capable and efficient officer, Balchen never found the wealth and prestige fellow officers secured in other commissions, a fact which remained a source of frustration to him until his elevation to knighthood shortly before his death.

== Nine Years' War ==
Balchen was born in February 1670, the only surviving child of John Balchen, gentleman, and his wife, Ann Edspur. Home educated, Balchen took a commission in the Royal Navy aged 15 and, seven years later, gained promotion to lieutenant. For most of this period Balchen was stationed in the West Indies and, during his service there, was lucky in his health; the West Indies command was considered very dangerous during this period, mortality rates amongst sailors stationed there being very high due to malaria and yellow fever. The high death rate led to rapid promotion for those who survived, and Balchen was made Post Captain at the relatively young age of 27 during the Nine Years' War. Balchen had spent the war aboard HMS Dragon and HMS Cambridge under Admiral John Neville, who was impressed enough with his subordinate to give him command of the prize ship HMS Virgin, the safe conduct of which to England earned him the step to captain.

== War of the Spanish Succession ==
As with the majority of the Royal Navy, Balchen was placed in reserve at the war's conclusion and returned to England to await further deployment. Whilst there, he married Susannah Apreece, daughter of an army colonel. The marriage produced six children, two of whom survived into adulthood; Frances, who later married Temple West (Vice Admiral Temple West) and George, who followed his father into the Navy. In 1701, Balchen was again at sea, commanding the small fireships HMS Firebrand and then HMS Vulcan with Sir George Rooke's fleet off the Spanish coast at the outbreak of the War of the Spanish Succession. He was probably engaged during the Battle of Vigo Bay in 1702, where Rooke's fleet captured a Spanish treasure fleet and was instrumental in the capture of the 56-gun Modéré, which he went on to briefly command as HMS Modéré.

In 1703, Balchen was transferred to the 44-gun frigate HMS Adventure in the North Sea. This was an area of great importance to the British war effort due to the convoys carrying naval supplies from Scandinavia, which crossed it regularly. The commission, however, yielded few opportunities in the way of prize money. The next year, he was transferred to the 54-gun HMS Chester, with which he was dispatched to the West African Coast, a region considered almost as fatal as the West Indies. Surviving once again, Balchen remained in the Chester and was attached to the convoys bound for Portugal and Virginia.

Balchen suffered his first defeat on 10 October 1707. Leaving the safety of Portsmouth harbour, his convoy was ambushed by a French squadron under Forbin and Duguay-Trouin, in what became the Battle at the Lizard. Although the dozen French warships were larger and stronger than the convoy escorts, Balchen took his ship into battle with the other warship captains. This action allowed the merchant convoy time to disperse and escape. The ensuing battle was one-sided, with the French warships battering three English ships into submission over several hours, including Balchen's command, which had been boarded by three French ships of the line. One British warship escaped, but HMS Devonshire exploded with the loss of nearly 900 lives. The French captured just 15 merchant ships from the hundreds in the convoy, as most made English ports before their pursuers could catch them.

Briefly a prisoner in France, Balchen, as an officer, was allowed to return to England on parole, where a court martial exonerated him for the loss of his ship and commended him for a brave defence. In 1709, he was formally exchanged for a French officer and returned to naval service, receiving command of the newly built 60-gun HMS Gloucester in August. Leaving Spithead on his first cruise in October, he had been at sea for just a few hours when Duguay-Trouin again appeared with a squadron of five ships of the line. Unable to outrun his opponents, Balchen engaged the 74-gun flagship Lis before being forced to surrender after being dismasted and threatened with boarding.

Balchen was exchanged almost immediately and the court martial, once again, exonerated him from all blame for the loss of his ship. He was rewarded for his bravery with command of HMS Colchester in 1710, in which, on 9 November, Balchen secured his first prize, a 20-gun French privateer which he outran in a gale. In 1712 and 1713, Balchen was in the Mediterranean under Sir John Jennings and returned home in 1713 for a period of unemployment on shore. With the end of the War of the Spanish Succession in 1715, Balchen was returned to sea in the 40-gun frigate HMS Diamond, which he used in the suppression of piracy in the West Indies until 1716. The same year, he received the shore position commanding the guardship HMS Orford in the Medway.

== War of the Quadruple Alliance ==
In 1718, war once again broke out and experienced officers were immediately given sea postings, Balchen in the 80-gun HMS Shrewsbury in the fleet of Sir George Byng. Arriving in the Mediterranean, Vice-Admiral Charles Cornewall made Shrewsbury his flagship and Balchen his flag captain, a position which remained until December of that year. In July 1718, Shrewsbury had been engaged at the Battle of Cape Passaro, at which a Spanish fleet had been comprehensively defeated; Balchen's first great naval action and his first major victory.

In May 1719, Balchen was given command of the 70-gun HMS Monmouth under Sir John Norris, and served in the Baltic and North Seas until 1722. In 1722, Balchen took over the guardship HMS Ipswich at Spithead and, in 1726, returned to the Monmouth for further service in the Baltic under Norris and Sir Charles Wager. In 1727 Balchen was part of a mission to resupply besieged Gibraltar, although, by the time the fleet arrived, the siege had been broken. In 1728, Balchen received promotion to Rear-Admiral. In 1731, after a period in command of the 60-gun HMS Dreadnought, Balchen took over the 80-gun HMS Princess Amelia and commanded her in support of a Spanish landing at Livorno. Balchen returned in December and, in 1734, was promoted to Vice-Admiral, spending the next five years at his estates in England.

== War of the Austrian Succession ==
At the outbreak of the War of Jenkins' Ear with Spain in 1739, Balchen commanded a squadron of seven ships off the Spanish Atlantic Coast. Tasked with intercepting Spanish convoys, Balchen was almost caught by a superior Spanish squadron, which forced him to withdraw deeper into the Atlantic. For several weeks, this provoked rumours in Britain that his force had been destroyed, until he got word to the Admiralty of his hurried retreat. During the next two years, Balchen spent most of his time on convoy duty and came to resent younger and more active officers who made substantial fortunes from prize money, like Edward Vernon. He confided to a friend in 1741:

"[We] have Nobody spoke of Now but Mr. Virnon; he has all the Glory, and success pursues him. The West Indie people will be so Rich there wont be Roome for them to purchase Lands; whilst I am forced to drudge from place to place for Nothing." [Sic]

== Loss of the Victory ==
In March 1743 Balchen received the command of the Greenwich Naval Hospital and an annual pension of £600, equivalent to £124,800 in 2025. Balchen chafed at being forced to remain ashore and was not pleased when he was forcibly retired in April 1744, aged 74. Two months later, however, Balchen was recalled up to the Admiralty. A fleet of 25 British and Dutch ships had been raised in a hurry to rescue a British squadron and convoy under Sir Charles Hardy, which had been trapped in the Tagus by a French Brest squadron. Due to a shortage of officers of sufficient experience and seniority to command a fleet of this kind, Balchen was called up at short notice and rewarded with a knighthood.

"He was retreating forever from the rage of the ocean, and from the dangers, difficulties and hardships, attending a sea-faring life. But when every danger was in appearance past, and every difficulty surmounted; when he was almost in sight of the harbour of repose, and the end of all his toils; a raging tempest blasted his pleasing hopes, and put a period at once to his life and worldly expectations."
The Life of Sir John Balchen, 1787.

Balchen's fleet was successful in driving off the French, who retired in the face of his superior fleet without firing a shot, and Hardy's convoy was escorted safely to Gibraltar. On the way to the Portuguese Coast, Balchen finally made his fortune in prize money, capturing six heavily laden French West Indiamen. On his return journey however, the fleet was sailing through the Western Approaches in early October when it was hit by a violent storm. Scattered across the Channel, they one by one returned to England in a battered and leaking condition until, a few days later, only HMS Victory was missing. Victory, Balchen's flagship, was, at the time, one of the largest ships in the world, holding a broadside of 100 guns. She was also very new, having been completed less than seven years before.

Frigates were dispatched across the English Channel to search for the missing battleship, which was last seen on the horizon on 4 October. Captain Thomas Grenville of the frigate HMS Falkland landed at Guernsey in the Channel Islands to reprovision and there heard from locals that wreckage and part of a topmast had washed up on the island's shores. Further investigation proved that the wreckage had indeed come from the Victory, which was believed to have run into the Casquets, a group of rocks nearby. Other wreckage was washed up on Jersey and Alderney, whose inhabitants had heard distress guns the night before the wreck but were unable to provide aid in the severe storm. Of the 1,150 sailors aboard Victory, none was ever recovered. In 2008, the wreck of Victory was found approximately 100 km (62 miles) from the Casquets.

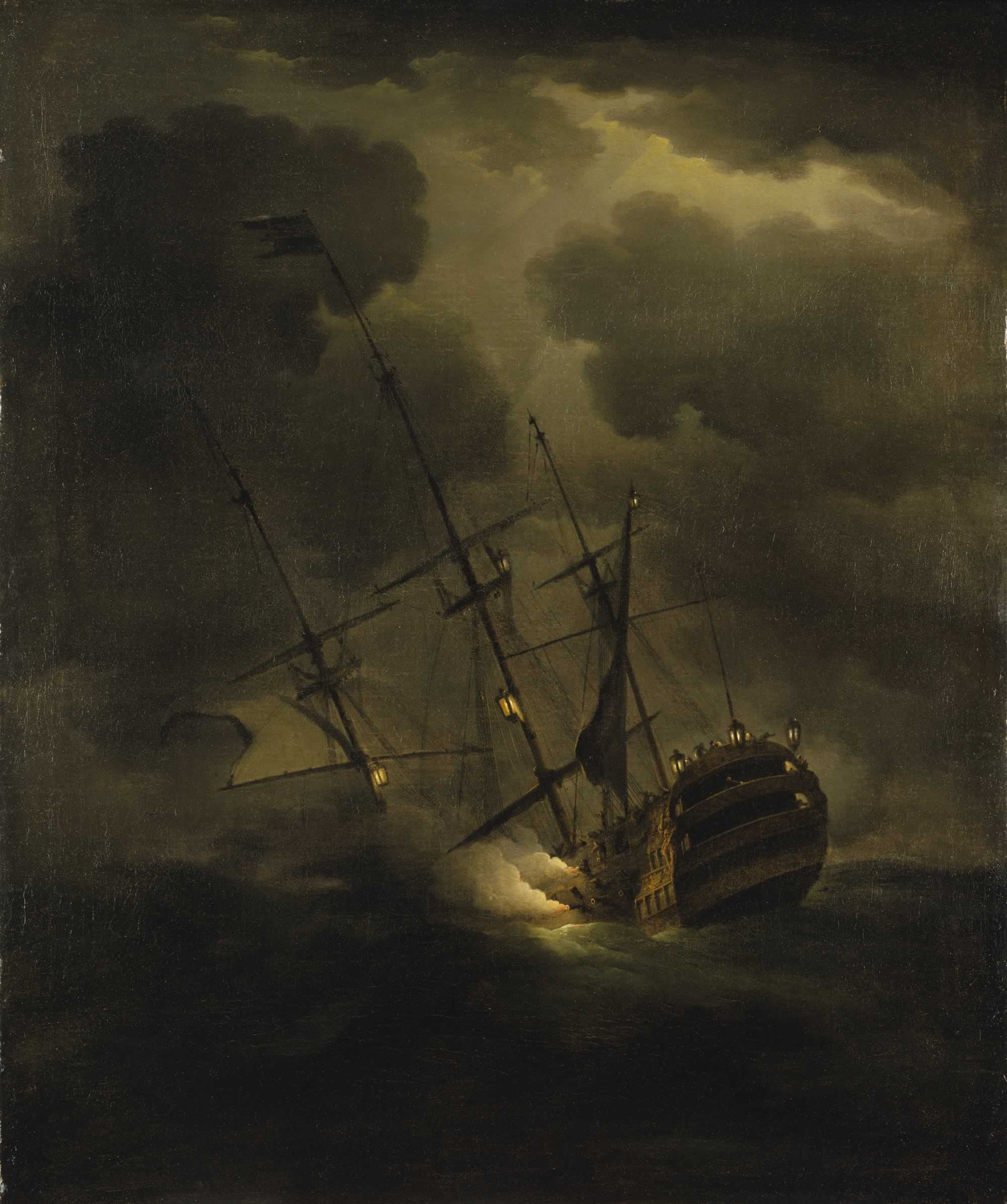
HMS Victory sinking with Balchen onboard

== Legacy ==
Balchen's death was met with national mourning in Britain, where he was regarded as an expert and veteran commander of great talent in seamanship, tactics and ship construction. He was also very popular with sailors below decks, having fought for them in the Admiralty over issues such as allowing volunteer seamen to transfer ship when their captain did the same and giving trustworthy sailors shore visiting privileges. His widow was allowed a pension of £500 a year following her husband's death and the consequent end of his income whilst his son George received a promotion to post captain. George, however, did not long outlive his father, dying of illness in Barbados the following year, aged only 28. His daughter, Frances, married British naval officer Temple West, best known for his role as second-in-command to Admiral John Byng in the Battle of Minorca (1756).

A large memorial to Balchen's memory was raised in Westminster Abbey, sculpted by Peter Scheemakers where it can still be seen. The relief commemorates Balchen's career, that of his son and also the men lost on the Victory in 1744 who have no other permanent memorial. Balchen is remembered in the Oxford Dictionary of National Biography as "a hard-working, thoroughgoing professional, recognised for his readiness to accept duty whenever and wherever required."

== In popular media ==
Actor Charles Gray was cast as Adm. Balchen in the TV series, Longitude in 2000.

== Other sources ==
- "Balchen, Sir John". Oxford Dictionary of National Biography (online ed.). Oxford University Press. 2004. doi:10.1093/ref:odnb/1152. (Subscription, Wikipedia Library access or UK public library membership required.)
- "The Life of Sir John Balchen" (PDF). The Lives of British Admirals, 1787.
- "Admiral Sir John Balchen". Balchin Family Society. Archived from the original on 28 September 2007.
- "Balchen (Sir John)" (PDF). The Biographical Magazine, 1776.

Military offices
Preceded by Sir John Jennings	Governor, Greenwich Hospital; 1743–1744	Succeeded by Lord Archibald Hamilton
