= Northumberland (ship) =

Several ships have been named Northumberland after the English county of Northumberland, or the Dukedom of Northumberland:

- Northumberland (1797 ship) was launched at South Shields in 1797. She made one voyage for the British East India Company (EIC). She then traded with the West Indies until she wrecked in 1805.
- Ships of the EIC:
  - Northumberland (1763 EIC ship) was launched in 1763 and made four voyages before she was sold. New owners renamed her Lord Shuldam for Lord Shuldham, and hired her out as an armed escort vessel; she was sold for breaking up in 1783.
  - Northumberland (1780 EIC ship) was launched in 1780 and made six voyages for the EIC before she was sold for breaking up in 1797
  - Northumberland (1805 EIC ship) was launched in 1805 and made six voyages of the EIC between 1805 and 1818. In 1810 and 1811 she served as a transport in the British invasions of Mauritius and Java. She was sold for breaking up in 1819.
- MV Northumberland (1955)
- MV Northumberland (2006)

== See also ==
- HMS Northumberland, one of eight vessels of that name that served the British Royal Navy
- French ship Northumberland, one of two ships of the French Navy, both former Royal Navy ships
- Northumberland (disambiguation)
