= Northumberland Park station =

Northumberland Park station may refer to:

- Northumberland Park station (Tyne and Wear), served by both National Rail & Tyne and Wear Metro England, United Kingdom
- Northumberland Park railway station (London), served by National Rail, England, United Kingdom

== See also ==
- Northumberland Park (disambiguation)
