= Henrik Johan Nauckhoff =

Swedish naval officer (1744–1818)

friherre Henrik Johan Nauckhoff
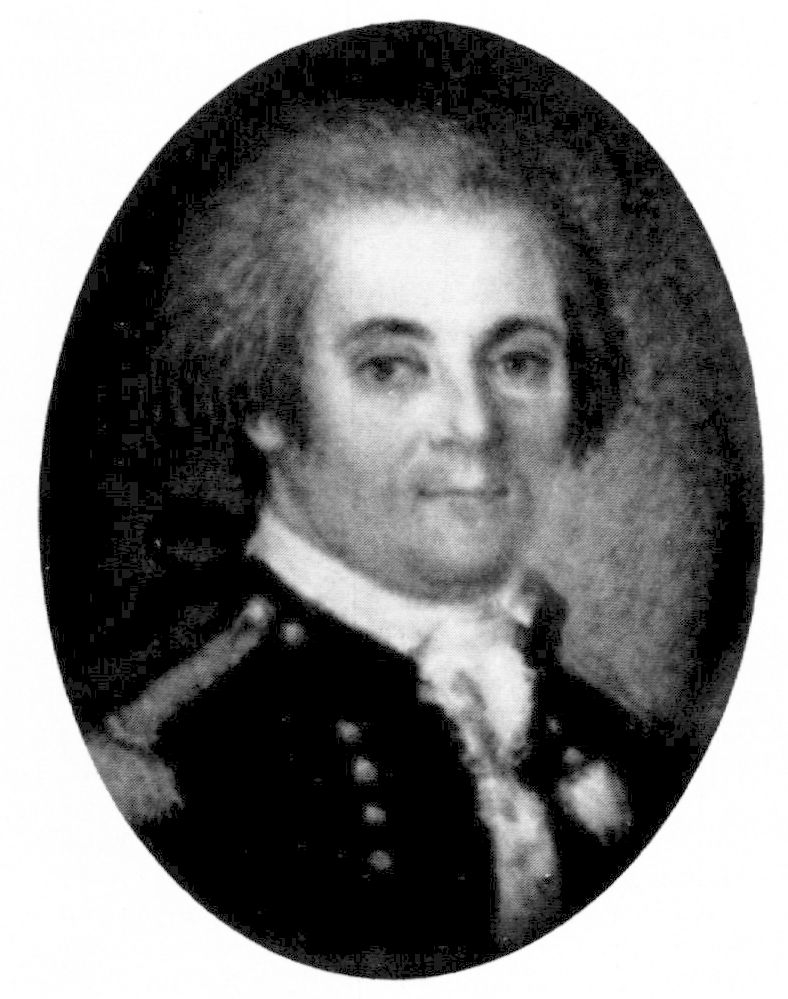
- Born: 13 October 1744; Kila parish, Södermanland, Sweden
- Died: 18 February 1818 (aged 73) Stockholm, Sweden
- Allegiance: Sweden; Kingdom of France
- Branch: Swedish Army; Swedish Navy; French Navy (1779–1783)
- Service years: 1761–1818
- Rank: Admiral
- Commands: Minerva; Wasa; Konung Adolf Fredrik
- Conflicts: American Revolutionary War; Invasion of Tobago; Battle of the Chesapeake; Battle of the Saintes; Russo-Swedish War (1788–1790); Battle of Hogland; Battle of Öland; Battle of Reval; Battle of Kronstadt; Battle of Vyborg Bay; Finnish War
- Awards: Order of Military Merit; Order of the Sword

Henrik Johan Nauckhoff (also Henric, Hindric; 13 October 1744 – 18 February 1818) was a Swedish naval officer and friherre (baron).

After having graduated as an officer in the Swedish Navy, Nauckhoff served on expeditions to Pomerania and Morocco before receiving his first commission as commander of a ship in 1776. He was granted leave in 1778 to serve in the French Navy in order to gain useful experience. He thus came to participate in the American Revolutionary War, and fought on the side of the French in the battles of Chesapeake and the Saintes; in the latter he was severely wounded and instrumental in saving the French ship Northumberland. For his service in the war he was awarded the French Order of Military Merit and the Swedish Order of the Sword, as well as a life-long pension from the French state.

After his return to Sweden, he would also participate actively in the Russo-Swedish War of 1788–1790, commanding ships in the battles of Hogland, Öland (with noted distinction), Reval, Kronstadt and Vyborg Bay. During the last of these, his ship ran aground and he was taken prisoner.

He returned to Sweden following the peace treaty with Russia, and would hold several positions on land during the peacetime period thereafter. In 1796 he was promoted to rear admiral. With the outbreak of the Finnish War in 1808, he returned to command a squadron. He was promoted to vice admiral in 1809, and to the rank of full admiral in 1817, after the end of the war. He died in Stockholm.

== Biography ==
=== Early years and the American Revolutionary War ===
Henrik Johan Nauckhoff was born in Kila parish in Södermanland, Sweden. He came from an aristocratic family which had come to Sweden from Estonia in the 17th century. His father was a major in the Swedish Army.

He started his military career in the army, joining the Uppland Regiment in 1761. In 1763, however, he transferred to the Swedish Navy, and graduated as a naval officer in Karlskrona in 1768. He was subsequently granted leave to serve in the merchant fleet, and sailed on several trading voyages before re-entering military service in 1770. He participated in expeditions to Pomerania and Morocco before receiving his first commission as commander of a ship in 1776.

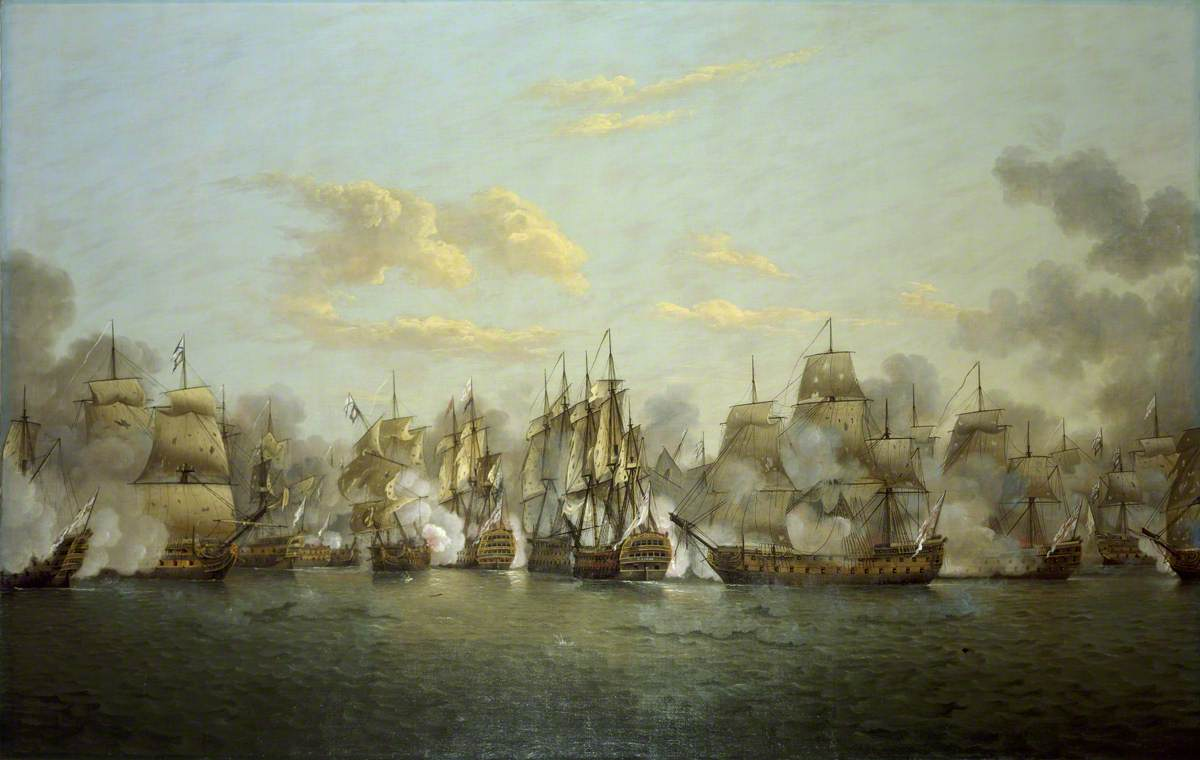
Depiction of the Battle of the Saintes by Thomas Luny. Nauckhoff was severely wounded in the battle but also instrumental in saving the French ship Northumberland.

Two years later he received permission to enter French service in order to broaden his experience. Following his arrival in Brest in 1779, he immediately embarked on the French ship of the line Alexandre with the rank of lieutenant de vaisseau and participated in the naval campaign against the British under the command of Admiral Guillouet as part of the French involvement in the American Revolutionary War. The following year he served on the same ship in the Bay of Biscay and the West Indies. In 1781 he was transferred to the ship Northumberland, which formed part of a convoy to transfer French troops to the Caribbean under the command of Admiral de Grasse. He participated in the French occupation of Tobago before sailing north with the fleet convoying reinforcements to General Lafayette on 5 August. He thus came to participate in the Battle of the Chesapeake on 5 September 1781. Following the battle, he was awarded the French Order of Military Merit and also received the rank of Knight of the Swedish Order of the Sword.

Nauckhoff also participated in the Battle of the Saintes in April 1782, and was severely wounded in the head. During the battle, all senior officers on board Northumberland were killed, wherefore Nauckhoff either took command himself or, according to different sources, vigorously aided the acting French commander, but in any case was instrumental in managing to convey the ship into the safety of present-day Cap-Haïtien. For this action he was rewarded by the French with a sum of money as well as an annual, life-long pension. He later made his way back to Europe on board the French ship Le Conquerant and re-entered Swedish service after the end of the war.

=== Russo-Swedish War ===
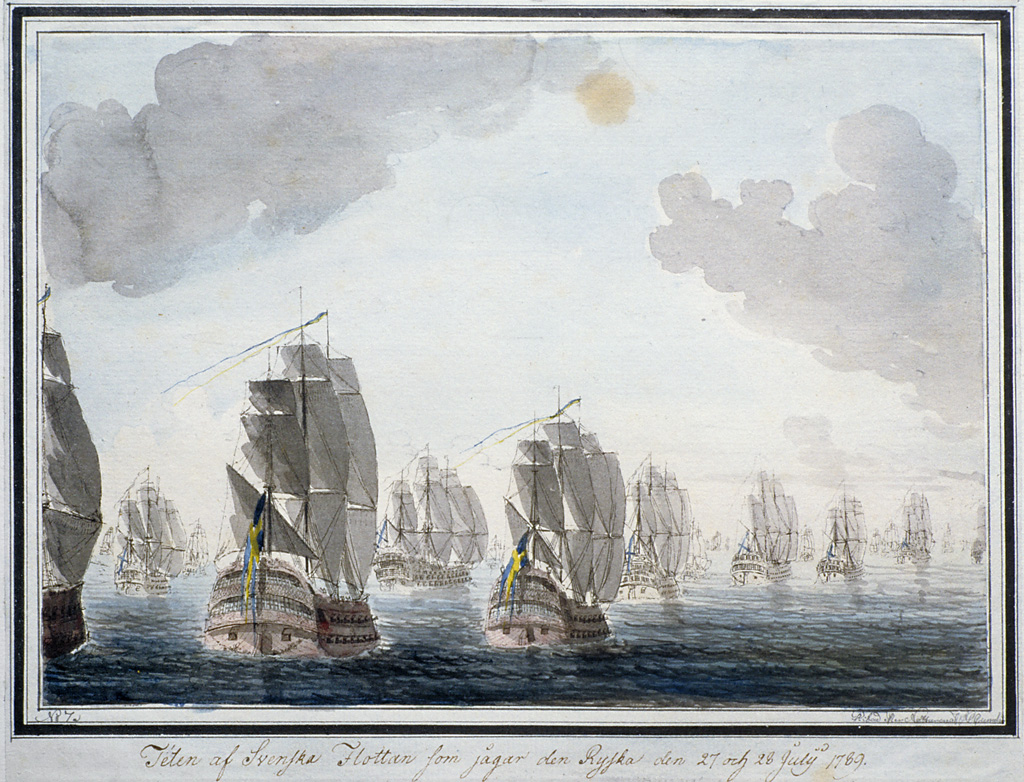
Near contemporary depiction of the Battle of Öland, in which Nauckhoff participated with distinction.

During the Russo-Swedish War of 1788–1790, Nauckhoff was initially given command of the Swedish frigate Minerva which he commanded during the Battle of Hogland. After the battle he was given command of the larger ship of the line Wasa. The following year he was transferred to the ship Konung Adolf Fredrik, on which he served with future admiral Rudolf Cederström and which he commanded with distinction at the Battle of Öland. Subsequently, Nauckhoff also participated in the naval battles of Reval, Kronstadt and Vyborg Bay. In the last battle the ship he commanded ran aground and he was taken prisoner. He would spend the rest of the war in Russian captivity.

=== Later years ===
Following the peace settlement in the Treaty of Värälä, Nauckhoff returned to Sweden as part of a prisoner exchange and in the following years had onshore duties, including as a member of several committees dedicated to naval issues. He was elected a member of the Royal Swedish Society of Naval Sciences in 1784. In 1796 he was promoted to rear admiral, and in 1799 elevated to Commander of the Order of the Sword. With the outbreak of the Finnish War in 1808, Nauckhoff again entered active duty as a squadron commander. Together with the British Baltic Fleet, under the command of admirals Saumarez (whom he had fought against while in French service) and Hood he sustained a blockade of a Russian squadron in Paldiski. In 1809 he was promoted to vice admiral and the rank of Commander Grand Cross of the Order of the Sword.

Following the war, Nauckhoff was elevated to the rank of friherre (baron) in 1813. In 1817 he was promoted to the rank of full admiral. He died on 18 February 1818 in Stockholm.

== Sources cited ==
- Benson, Adolph B. (1926). Sweden and the American Revolution. New Haven: Tuttle, Morehouse & Taylor. OCLC 1414856625.
- Dahl, Torsten, ed. (1948). Svenska män och kvinnor. Biografisk uppslagsbok [Swedish men and women. Biographical dictionary] (in Swedish). Vol. 5. Stockholm: Albert Bonnier. p. 407. OCLC 4629338.
- Elgenstierna, Gustaf (1930). Den introducerade svenska adelns ättartavlor (in Swedish). Vol. 5. Stockholm: P. A. Nordstedt. OCLC 20464762.
- Grandin, Gunnar (1987). "Hindric Johan Nauckhoff". Svenskt biografiskt lexikon (in Swedish). Vol. 26. p. 457 – via Swedish National Archives.
- Hofberg, Herman; Heurlin, Frithiof; Millqvist, Viktor; Rubenson, Olof, eds. (1906). Svenskt biografiskt handlexikon [Swedish biographical handbook] (in Swedish). Vol. 2. Stockholm: Bonniers. OCLC 474064019.
