= Northumbria (disambiguation) =

Northumbria was an Anglo-Saxon kingdom in early medieval England.

Northumbria or Northumbrian may also refer to:

== Language ==
- Northumbrian burr, a distinctive uvular pronunciation of R in the traditional dialects of Northumberland and north Durham
- Northumbrian dialect, any of several English language varieties spoken in Northumbria or Northumberland
- Northumbrian Old English, a dialect of Old English spoken in the Kingdom of Northumbria

== Military ==
- 50th (Northumbrian) Division (1908–1919)
- 50th (Northumbrian) Infantry Division (1920–1945; 1947–1961)
- 23rd (Northumbrian) Division (1939–1940)

== Other uses ==
- Northumbria (European Parliament constituency)
- Northumbria (locomotive), an 1830 steam locomotive built by Robert Stephenson
- Northumbria (modern), a term denoting the region of north-east England between the Tweed and Tees
- Northumbria Police, a territorial police force in the North East of England.
- Northumbria University, a university located in Newcastle upon Tyne in the North East of England
- Earl of Northumbria, a former English title of nobility
- HMS Northumbria (M1146) (1954–1988), a British Royal Navy minesweeper
- Esso Northumbria, an oil tanker launched in 1969
- Country proposed by the Northern Independence Party of England

== See also ==
- Team Northumbria (disambiguation)
- Northumberland (disambiguation)
- North East England
