= Battle at The Lizard =

1707 battle of the War of the Spanish Succession

- Part of the War of the Spanish Succession
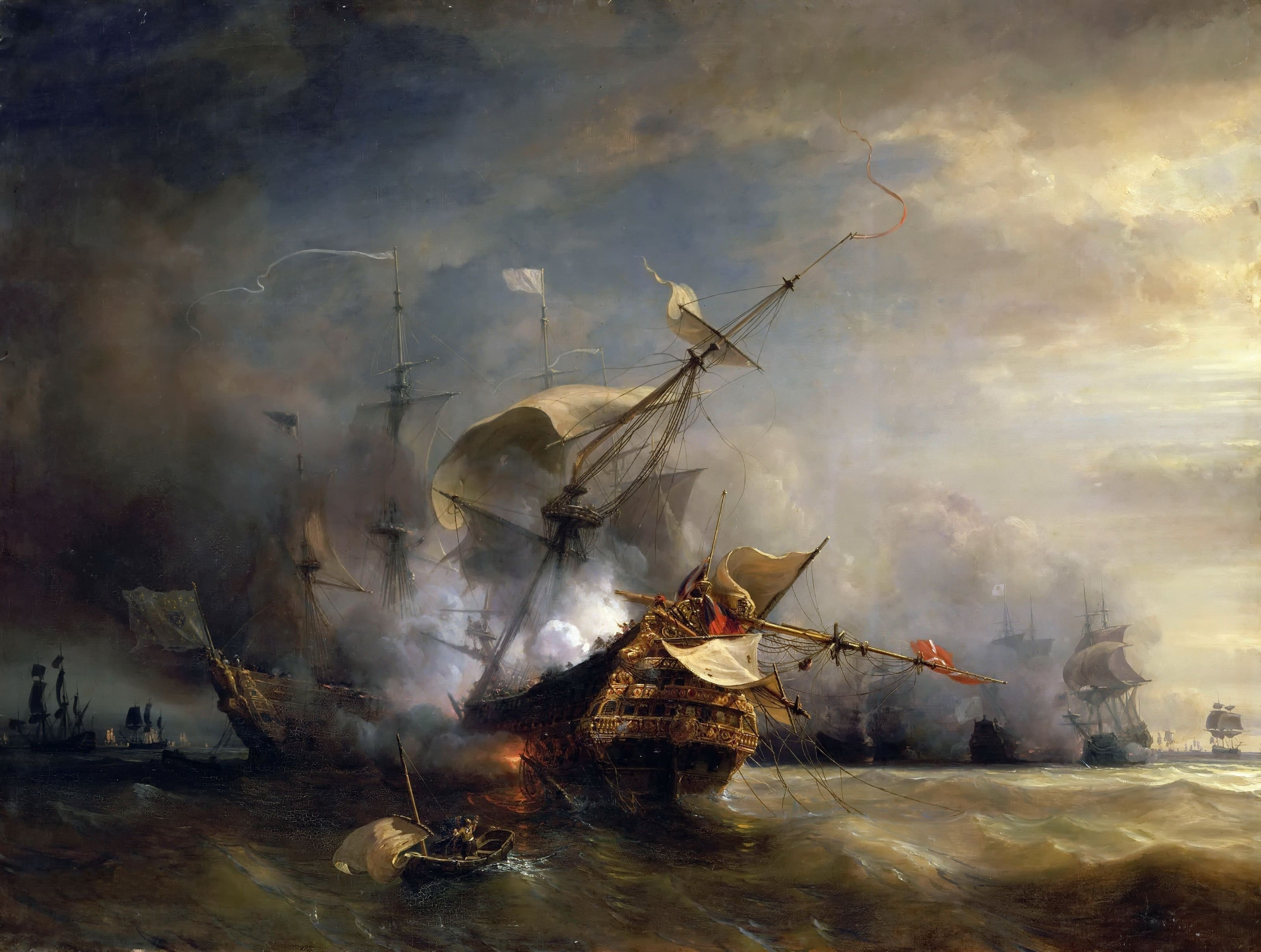
- 19th-century painting of the battle by Théodore Gudin
Date	21 October 1707
Location	Off Lizard Point, Atlantic Ocean near 49.9535°N 5.2096°W
Result	French victory

Belligerents
France	Great Britain

Commanders and leaders
René Duguay-Trouin; Claude de Forbin	Richard Edwards

Strength
12 warships	5 ships of the line 130 merchant ships

Casualties and losses
300 killed or wounded	800 killed or wounded 1,500 captured 3 ships of the line captured 1 ship of the line destroyed 15 merchant ships captured

The Battle at The Lizard (French: Combat du Cap Lézard) took place on 21 October 1707 during the War of the Spanish Succession near Lizard Point, Cornwall between two French squadrons under René Duguay-Trouin and Claude de Forbin and a British convoy protected by a squadron under Commodore Richard Edwards. Duguay-Trouin and Forbin were two of the most successful French naval commanders and they caused much damage to the British merchant fleet.

== Battle ==
On 20 October 1707 a large merchant fleet consisting of 80 to 130 British merchantmen left Plymouth for Portugal with supplies for the war in Spain. The fleet was escorted by a squadron of five ships of the line under Commodore Richard Edwards. The next day near Lizard Point they were spotted by 2 French squadrons of 6 ships each. Technically Forbin was the senior French officer, but Duguay-Trouin was the more aggressive, and his ships led the attack and suffered most of the damage, after Forbin had discovered the British convoy.

This battle was almost a complete victory for the French; the 80-gun Cumberland and the 50-guns Chester and Ruby were taken, but Royal Oak escaped into Kinsale with a few merchantmen. The 80-gun Devonshire defended herself for several hours against seven French ships until she caught fire and blew up, only three men escaping out of 500.

There is no unanimity on the number of merchantmen captured. French sources speak of 60 ships out of 80, some British sources speak of none at all. The fact that René Duguay-Trouin and Claude de Forbin quarrelled for many years about which of the two squadrons had the biggest role in the victory, points to a considerable number of ships captured. Probably the truth is somewhere in between: Polak in "Bibliographie maritime française" speaks of 15 merchantmen captured.

== Order of battle ==
=== Britain (Edwards) ===
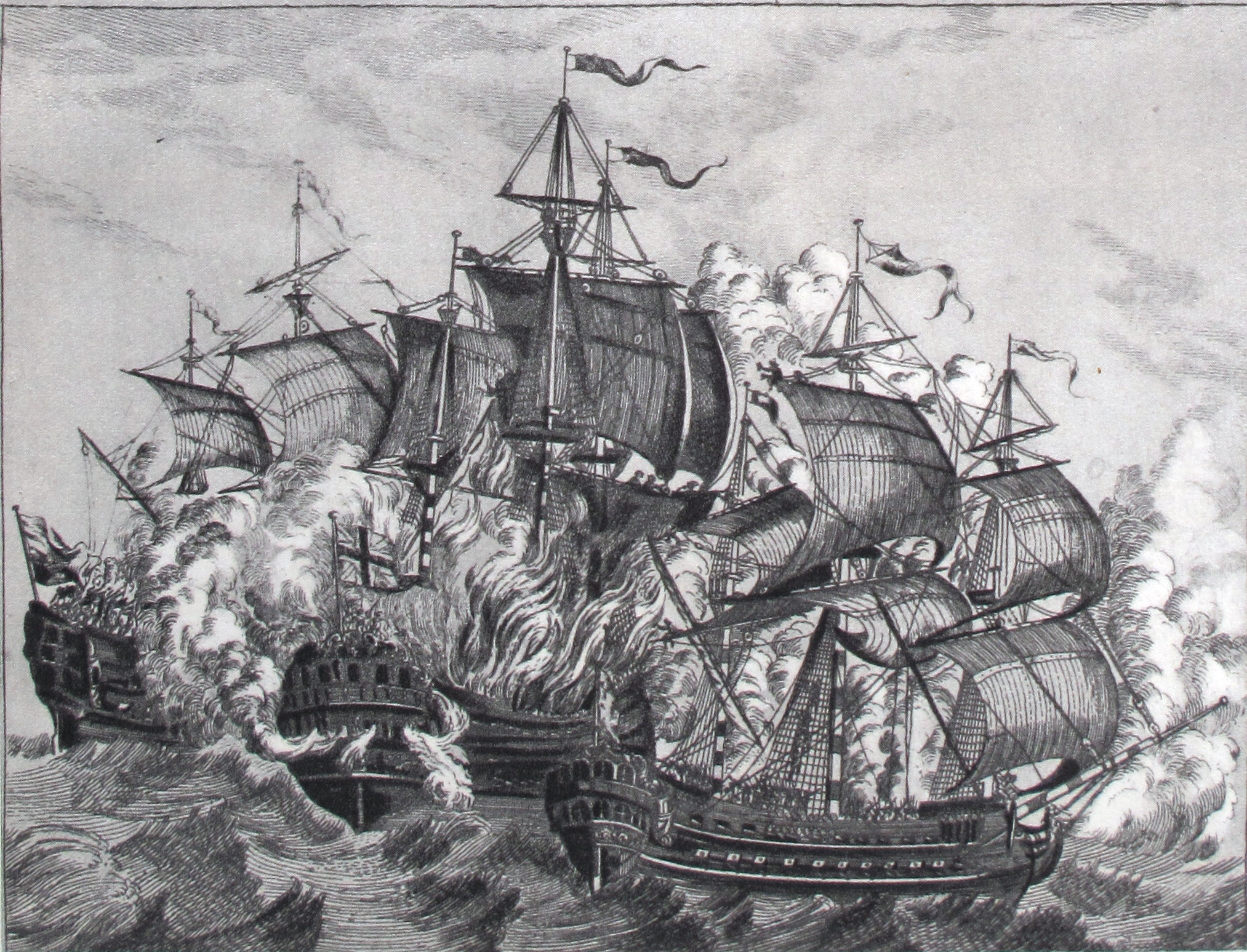
HMS Devonshire exploding during the battle

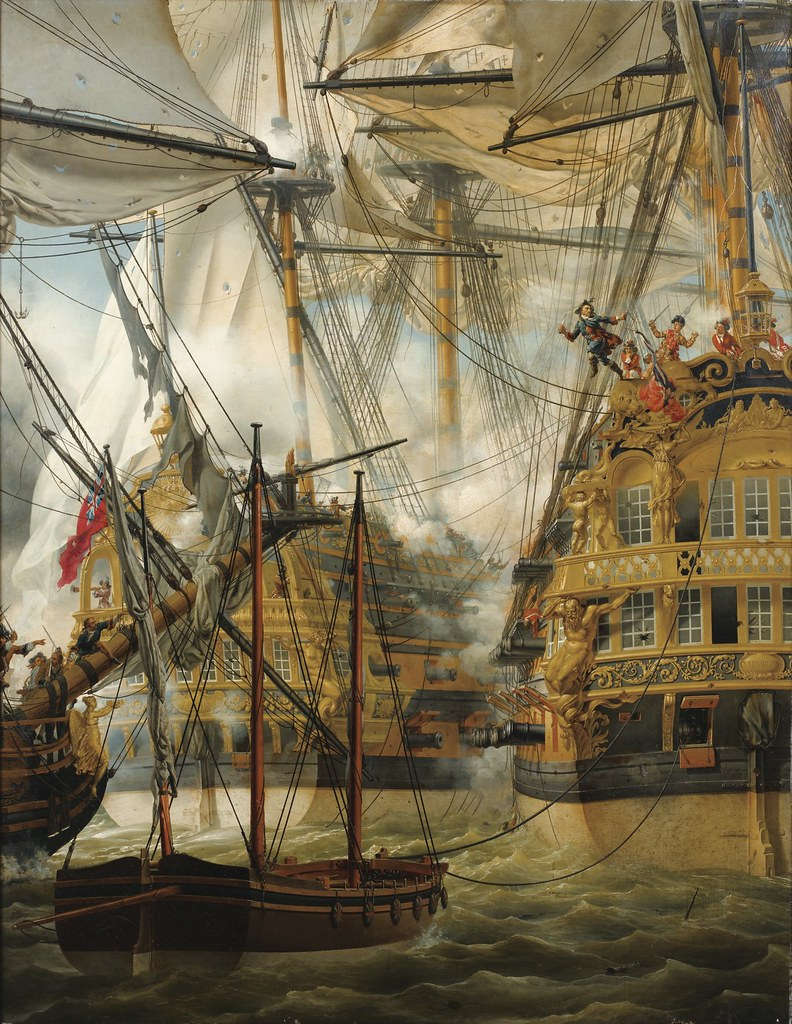
The Battle of the Lily and the Glory against the Cumberland (Louis-Philippe Crépin, 1827)

Ship	Guns	Commander	Notes
Cumberland	80	Commodore Richard Edwards	Surrendered to Lys
Devonshire	80	Captain John Watkins †	Exploded, three survivors
Royal Oak	76	Captain Baron Wylde	Escaped to Kinsale
Chester	50	Captain John Balchen	Surrendered to Jason
Ruby	50	Captain the Hon. Peregrine Bertie	Surrendered to Amazone

=== France (Forbin) ===
Ship	Guns	Commander	Notes
Mars	54	Rear-Admiral Claude de Forbin	
Blackwall	54	Captain Jean Alexandre de Tourouvre	Lost bowsprit in collision with Devonshire
Salisbury	52	Captain Kerlo de l'Isle	
Protée	48	Captain the Comte de Illiers	
Jersey	46	Captain François Cornil Bart	
Griffon	44	Captain the Comte de Nangis	
Dauphine	44	Captain the Comte de Roquefeuil	
Fidèle	44	Captain Hennequin	
Dryade	32	Captain Joris van Crombrugghe	

=== France (Duguay-Trouin) ===
Ship	Guns	Commander	Notes
Lys	72	Captain René Duguay-Trouin	
Achille	64	Captain the Chevalier de Beauharnois	Lost bowsprit in collision with Royal Oak; Poopdeck destroyed in cartridge explosion
Jason	54	Captain the Chevalier de Coursérac	
Maure	50	Captain Thomas Auguste Moinerie-Miniac	
Amazone	40	Lieutenant Joseph de Nesmond de Brie	
Gloire	38	Captain the Chevalier de La Jaille	Lost bowsprit in collision with Lys
