= Thomas Watson (Royal Navy officer) =

British Royal Navy captain

Captain Thomas Watson
- Died: 4 June 1744; France

Captain Thomas Watson (died 4 June 1744) was a Royal Navy officer who served in the War of the Austrian Succession. He was taken prisoner at the action of 8 May 1744 and died in France less than a month later.

== Biography ==
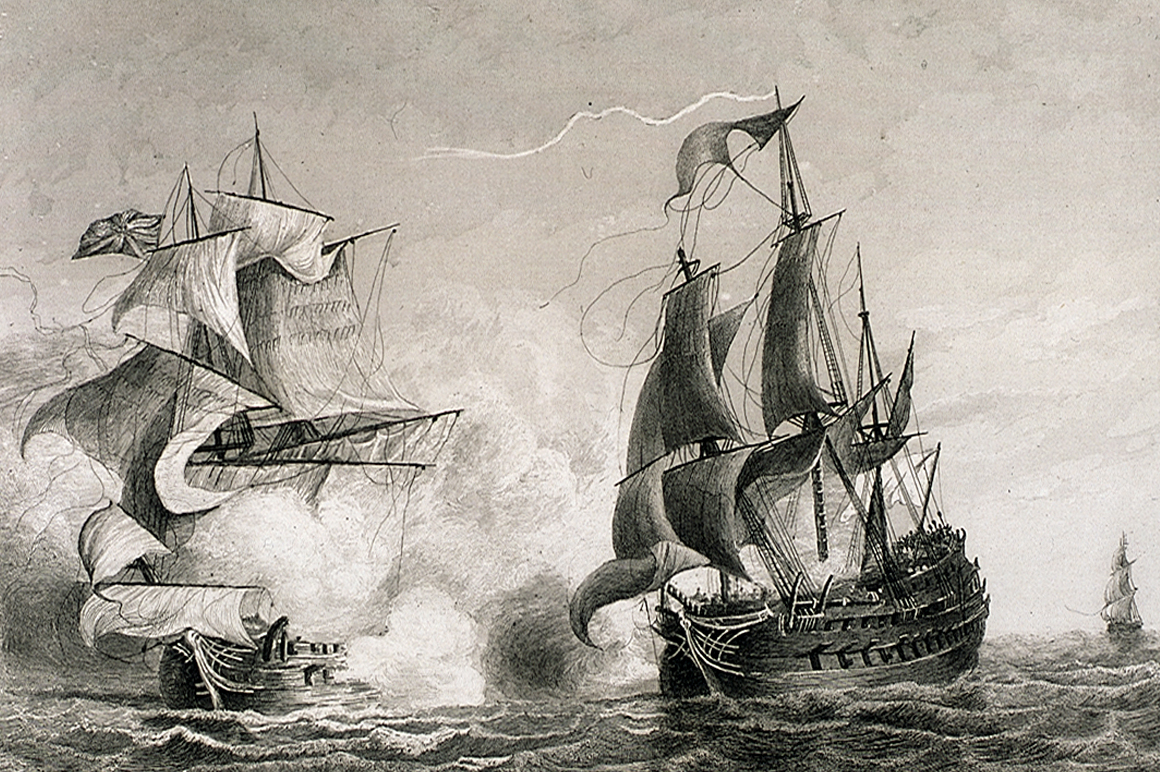
The action of 8 May 1744, at which Watson was captured

Watson may very possibly, as Charnock supposes, have served as a midshipman with Edward Vernon, perhaps in the Grafton. The only mention of him now to be found is as first lieutenant of the Antelope in 1733, till his promotion on 7 October 1737 to be captain of the Antelope. On 10 July 1739 he was appointed to the Burford as Vernon's flag-captain, and acted in that capacity at the reduction of Porto Bello. In January 1740–1 he moved with Vernon to the Princess Caroline, was flag-captain during the abortive attack on Cartagena, and in June 1741 moved again with Vernon to the Boyne, in which he returned to England in December 1742. In September 1743 he was appointed to the 70-gun ship Northumberland, which in the following spring was one of the fleet sent out to Lisbon under the command of Sir Charles Hardy the elder. On the homeward voyage at daybreak on 8 May the Northumberland, looking out ahead, was ordered by signal to chase a strange sail seen to the northward. She did not come up with it, and did not obey her recall, which was made about two o'clock. The weather got thick and squally; she lost sight of the fleet; then of the chase; but about four o'clock sighted three ships to the leeward, that is in the east quarter, the wind being westerly. Towards these strangers the Northumberland ran down. They lay-to wait for her; it was seen that they were French and that two of them were ships of 64 guns; the third was a 26-gun frigate. One of the 64-gun ships, the Content, was about a mile to windward of her consort, the Mars; and if Watson had engaged her, he might possibly have disabled her before the Mars could come to her support. It was clearly the only sane thing to do, if he refused to accept the advice offered by the master and endeavour to lead the Frenchmen back to Hardy's fleet.

But Watson was in no humour to follow advice or plan which savoured of caution. While with Vernon he must have been a capable officer; but since then, it is said, his skull had been fractured in a fall, ‘and a small matter of liquor rendered him quite out of order—which was his unhappy fate that day’ (A True and Authentick Narrative of the Action between the Northumberland and three French Men of War ... By an Eye-Witness). ‘We bore down on them,’ says the eye-witness, ‘so precipitately that our small sails were not stowed nor top-gallant sails furled before the enemy began to fire on us, and at the same time had the cabins to clear away; the hammocks were not stowed as they should be; in short, we had nothing in order as we should before action.’ About five o'clock the Northumberland closed with the Content and received her fire, but, without replying to it, ran down to the Mars. The Content followed, so did the frigate. The Northumberland was a target for the three of them. The men at the wheel were killed, and nobody thought of sending others to take their place. The captain was mad-drunk, the master a shivering coward, and the lieutenants unable or unwilling to take the command. The captain was mortally wounded; and before the first lieutenant could get on deck, the master struck the colours, and the ship was taken possession of. Watson died in France on 4 June 1744. The master, tried by court-martial on 1 February 1745, was sentenced to be imprisoned in the Marshalsea for life; he was spared the capital punishment on the ground that he had given good advice to his captain before the action.
