= North Umbria =

North Umbria may refer to:

- The north of Umbria, a region in Italy
- Northumbria, medieval kingdom in what is now Northern England and South-East Scotland

== See also ==
Northumbria (disambiguation)
