= HMS Northumberland =

Eight ships of the Royal Navy have borne the name HMS Northumberland after the English county of Northumberland, or the Dukedom of Northumberland. Another was planned but later cancelled:

- HMS Northumberland (1679) was a 70-gun third rate launched in 1679. She was rebuilt in 1701 and was wrecked in the Great Storm of 1703.
- HMS Northumberland was a 70-gun third rate launched in 1705. She was rebuilt from 1719 to 1721, and again from 1741 to 1743 (the last time as a 64-gun ship), and was captured by the French Navy off Ushant in 1744.
- HMS Northumberland (1750) was a 70-gun third rate launched in 1750. She was converted into a storeship in 1777 and renamed HMS Leviathan. She foundered in 1780.
- HMS Northumberland (1794) was a 78-gun third rate captured from the French Navy at the Battle of the Glorious First of June in 1794 and broken up in 1795.
- HMS Northumberland (1798) was a 74-gun third rate launched in 1798, notable as the ship that carried Napoleon to his final exile on the island of Saint Helena in 1815. She was converted to a hulk in 1827 and broken up in 1850.
- HMS Northumberland (1866) was a Minotaur-class ironclad battleship launched in 1866. She became a depot ship in 1898 and was renamed HMS Acheron on becoming a training ship in 1904. She was converted to a hulk and renamed C8 in 1909, and renamed C68 in 1926. She was sold 1927 and later resold as the hulk Stedmound.
- HMS Northumberland was to have been a County-class heavy cruiser ordered in 1929 but cancelled in 1930.
- HMS Northumberland was a Type 23 frigate launched in 1992 and decommissioned in 2025.

HMCS Northumberland was to have been a River-class frigate of the Royal Canadian Navy, but the order was cancelled in 1943.

== Battle honours ==
Ships named Northumberland have earned the following battle honours:

- Barfleur 1692
- Vigo 1702
- Louisburg 1758
- Quebec 1759
- Egypt 1801
- San Domingo 1806
- Groix Island 1812

== See also ==
- French ship Northumberland
