= French ship Northumberland =

Several ships of the French Navy have borne the name Northumberland:

- Northumberland (1744) was captured in 1744 and taken into service with the French Navy as Northumberland. She was renamed Atlas in 1766 and sank in February 1781 off the coast of Ushant.
- French ship Northumberland (1780), a 74-gun Annibal-class ship of the line, captured in 1794, taken into service as HMS Northumberland. Broken up in December 1795.
