= Action of 8 May 1744 =

1744 action of the War of the Austrian Succession

- Part of the War of the Austrian Succession
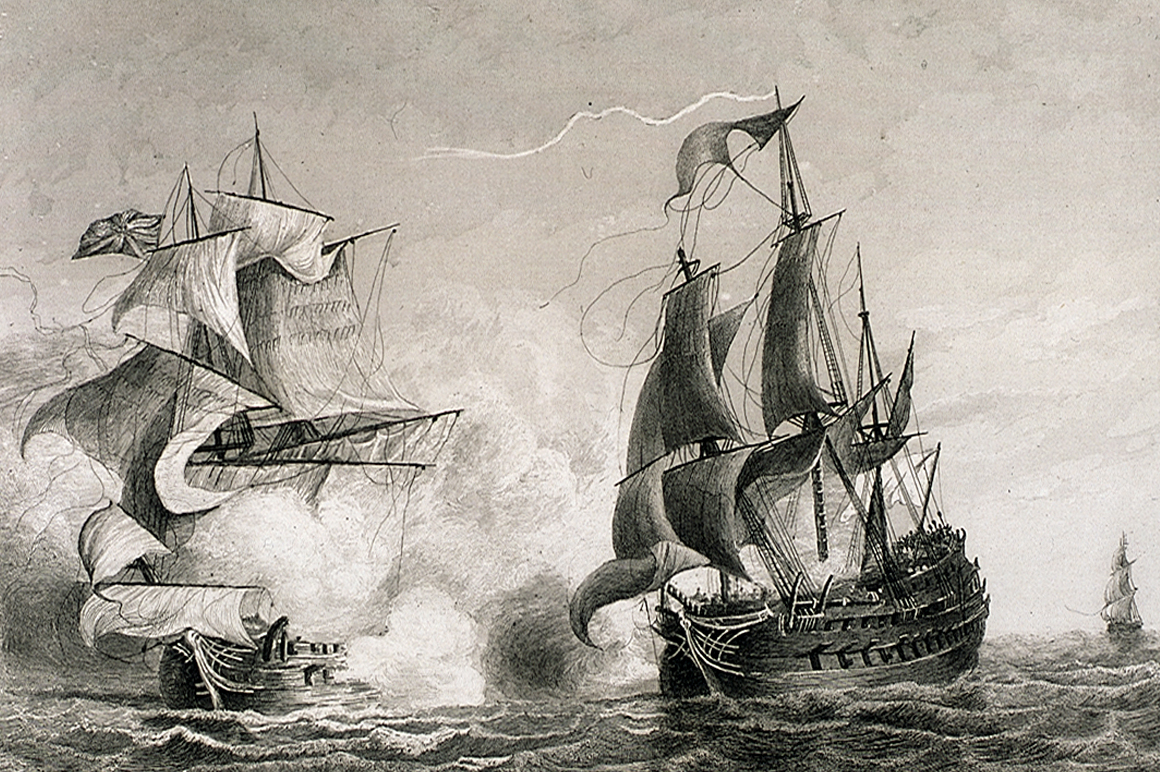
- 1838 illustration of the action
Date	8 May 1744
Location	Off Berlengas, Atlantic Ocean
Result	French victory

Belligerents
France	Great Britain

Commanders and leaders
Hubert de Brienne; Étienne Perier	Thomas Watson †

Strength
2 ships of the line 1 frigate	1 ship of the line

Casualties and losses
Unknown	1 ship of the line captured

The action of 8 May 1744 (Note: Because Britain still used the Julian calendar at the time, British sources date the engagement to 8 May; French sources, using the Gregorian calendar, date the same engagement to 19 May.) was a minor naval engagement of the War of the Austrian Succession in which two French ships of the line, the 60-gun Content, and the 64-gun Mars, captured the British 70-gun HMS Northumberland after a desperate action lasting four hours. Northumberland's captain, Thomas Watson, and her second lieutenant were among those killed.

== Battle ==
On 8 May, Vice-Admiral Sir Charles Hardy's squadron cruising off Berlengas discovered a sail to the north, and the Northumberland was ordered to chase in that direction. The enemy sail was made out by the Northumberland to be a French ship of the line, and was found to be accompanied by two other ships; a 60-gun vessel and a frigate.

Instead of signalling the force of the ships in sight to the vice-admiral, Watson continued standing towards them under full sail, and was soon out of sight of his own fleet. The French ships were much separated; and at 5 pm Northumberland caught up with the stern most, which proved to be the Mars. Mars opened fire upon the Northumberland, which was immediately returned with vigour. But Captain Watson, whose bravery must ever be considered to have ranked higher than his discretion, instead of continuing to engage the Mars, pushed on and endeavoured to close the Content also; maintaining all the time, a running action with the Mars.

When the French ship Content approached, a most furious battle took place. After nine hours of fighting by the Northumberland was rendered wholly unmanageable, and having had her wheel knocked to pieces, the ship flew up into the wind. At the same time Captain Watson was mortally wounded; and the master of the ship, who was later court-martialled and sentenced to life imprisonment, struck the British colours.
