= Bon Chrétien de Briqueville =

French Navy officer of the War of American Independence

- Born: 2 October 1726; Bretteville, Manche, France
- Died: 1 January 1803; Valognes, France
- Branch: French Navy
- Rank: Chef d'Escadre
- Battles / wars: War of American Independence
- Awards: Order of Saint Louis

Bon Chrétien de Briqueville (Bretteville, Manche, 2 October 1726—Valognes, 1 January 1803) (Note: Also written "Bricqueville".) was a French Navy officer. He served in the War of American Independence, earning membership in the Society of the Cincinnati, and was one of the prominent figures of the Académie de Marine.

== Biography ==
Bricqueville was born to the family of Madeleine de la Motte de Pont-Roger and of Guillaume Antoine de Briqueville, and a distant relative of Vice-Admiral Henri de Briqueville de La Luzerne. He joined the Navy as a Garde-Marine in on 2 November 1743.

He served on the 32-gun frigate Perle and took part in Duc d'Anville expedition to Acadia under La Rochefoucauld. He served on the 64-gun Lys and was taken prisoner by the British after Action of 8 June 1755, and released in January 1756.

Bricqueville was promoted to Lieutenant on 15 May 1756. He then supervised construction of the 12-gun corvette Levrette and of the 22-gun frigate Guirlande.

Bricqueville was awarded the Order of Saint Louis in 1763. He was Director of the Académie de Marine for the year 1771. He was promoted to Captain on 18 February 1772. In 1773, he was one of the rapporteurs on Kerguelen's work after his expedition to Kerguelen Islands.

From 1775, he commanded the 32-gun frigate Légère in the squadron under Guichen.

In 1775, he commanded the 18-gun corvette Hirondelle in the Escadre d'évolutions.

In 1778, he commanded the 64-gun Solitaire in the Third Division of the Blue squadron in the fleet of Orvilliers, and took part in the Battle of Ushant on 27 July 1778.

From 1779, Bricqueville commanded the 74-gun Northumberland. From 1781, she was attached to the White squadron in the fleet under De Grasse.

He captained her at the Battle of the Chesapeake on 5 September 1781, in the subsequent Siege of Yorktown, and in the invasion of Saint Kitts. Briqueville was relieved of duty on medical grounds on 19 February 1782 and returned to France on the 32-gun frigate Aigrette.

In 1782, Bricqueville was promoted to Brigadier des armées navales, and on 20 August 1784 to Chef d'Escadre.

== Sources and references ==
Notes

Citations

References

- Contenson, Ludovic (1934). La Société des Cincinnati de France et la guerre d'Amérique (1778-1783). Paris: éditions Auguste Picard. OCLC 7842336.
- Doneaud Du Plan, Alfred (1878). Histoire de l'Académie de marine (in French). Paris: Berger-Levrault.
- Lacour-Gayet, Georges (1910). La marine militaire de la France sous le règne de Louis XVI. Paris: Honoré Champion. pp. 431–434.
- Troude, Onésime-Joachim (1867). Batailles navales de la France (in French). Vol. 2. Challamel ainé.
- Vergé-Franceschi, Michel (2002). Dictionnaire d'Histoire maritime. Paris: Robert Laffont. ISBN 2-221-08751-8.

External links

- Académie de Marine (2011). "BRIQUEVILLE" (PDF). Académie de Marine.
- Archives nationales (2011). "Fonds Marine, sous-série B/4: Campagnes, 1571-1785" (PDF).
