= HMS Warwick (1696) =

Ship of the line of the Royal Navy

History

Great Britain
- Name: HMS Warwick
- Ordered: 25 September 1695
- Builder: Robert & John Castle, Deptford
- Launched: 20 August 1696
- Fate: Broken up, 1726

General characteristics as built
- Class & type: 50-gun fourth rate ship of the line
- Tons burthen: 686 71/94 bm
- Length: 130 ft 5 in (39.8 m) (gundeck) 109 ft (33.2 m) (keel)
- Beam: 34 ft 5 in (10.5 m)
- Depth of hold: 13 ft 9 in (4.2 m)
- Propulsion: Sails
- Sail plan: Full-rigged ship
- Armament: 50 guns of various weights of shot

General characteristics after 1711 rebuild
- Class & type: 1706 Establishment 50-gun fourth rate ship of the line
- Tons burthen: 722 4/04 bm
- Length: 130 ft (39.6 m) (on gundeck) 107 ft 2.5 in (32.7 m) (keel)
- Beam: 35 ft 7 in (10.8 m)
- Depth of hold: 14 ft (4.3 m)
- Propulsion: Sails
- Sail plan: Full-rigged ship
- Armament: 50 guns: Gundeck: 22 × 18 pdrs; Upper gundeck: 22 × 9 pdrs; Quarterdeck: 4 × 6 pdrs; Forecastle: 2 × 6 pdrs

HMS Warwick was a 50-gun fourth rate ship of the line of the Royal Navy, one of four ordered in September 1694 (Blackwall and Guernsey on 12 September and Nonsuch and Warwick on 25 September) to be built by commercial contracts; eight further ships of this type were ordered on 24 December (six to be built by contract and two in Royal Dockyards). The Warwick was built by Robert and John Castle at their Deptford shipyard and launched on 20 August 1696.

On 3 May 1709 she was ordered to be rebuilt according to the 1706 Establishment, and a contract for this was agreed on 9 May with shipbuilder Richard Burchett at Rotherhithe; after the work was completed, she was re-launched on 9 January 1711. She undertook a voyage to Newfoundland (under Captain Henry Partington) as escort to a merchant convoy; on her return she was fitted at Woolwich Dockyard for a voyage to "the South Seas" (Buenos Aires), and on return to Woolwich she underwent a Great Repair between November 1716 and July 1717. She was recommissioned in 1720 for service in the Baltic Sea (under Captain Thomas Willyams). The Warwick was docked to be broken up at Plymouth Dockyard on 20 December 1726.
