= HMS Dunwich =

1695 Maidstone Group sixth-rate frigate

History

England
- Name: HMS Dunwich
- Ordered: 22 March 1695
- Builder: William Collins & Robert Chatfield, Shoreham
- Launched: 15 October 1695
- Commissioned: 25 May 1695
- Fate: Sunk as a breakwater 15 October 1714

General characteristics
- Type: 20-gun Sixth Rate
- Tons burthen: 250 90/94 bm
- Length: 93 ft 7 in (28.5 m) gundeck; 78 ft 10.5 in (24.0 m) keel for tonnage
- Beam: 24 ft 6.5 in (7.5 m) for tonnage
- Depth of hold: 10 ft 8 in (3.3 m)
- Armament: initially as ordered; 20 × sakers on wooden trucks (UD); 4 × 3-pdr on wooden trucks (QD); 1703 Establishment; 20 × 6-pdrs on wooden trucks (UD); 4 × 4-pdr on wooden trucks (QD)

HMS Dunwich was a member of the standardized 20-gun sixth rates built at the end of the 17th century. After commissioning she spent her career mainly in Home Waters with forays to Morocco, North America and the Mediterranean. She was involved in the capture of five privateers. She was sunk as a breakwater in 1714.

Dunwich was the only vessel so named in the Royal Navy.

== Construction ==
She was ordered in the Third Batch of two ships to be built under contract by William Collins & Robert Chatfield of Shoreham. She was launched on 15 October 1695. She was completed at a cost of her hull £1,625 (Note: A total amount accounting for inflation of approximately £291,500 in today's money.) plus £812 (Note: A total amount accounting for inflation of approximately £145,600 in today's money.) for fitting.

== Commissioned service ==
Commissioned on 25 May 1696 under the command of Captain Nicholas Trevanion, RN she saw service in the Bristol Channel before being assigned to Norris's squadron off Newfoundland. In June 1697 Captain John Canby, RN took command remaining in Norris's squadron. On 8 October 1697 saw a new commander, Captain Tudor Trevor, RN followed by Captain Mark Noble, RN in 1698 for service in the English Channel. In February 1698 she moved on to Cadiz and the Mediterranean then moved to Sale, Morocco in 1700. In 1700 she was assigned to the British Fleet. With the death of Captain Noble on 22 March 1702, Captain William Harding, RN took command the next day on the 23rd, then participated on the attack on Cadiz with Fairbourne's squadron.

In 1703 with Captain John Wooden, RN in command she was assigned to fisheries protection off the Sussex coast. Here she took the privateer, La Gracieuse on 7 March 1703. Captain Christopher Elliot, RN took over command on 21 March 1703 for service in Home Waters. Captain Elliot died on 27 December 1704. On 15 February 1705 Captain William Jones, RN assumed command followed by Captain George Lumley on 17 September 1706 for service in the North Sea. She took the privateer, La Roue de Fortune on 5 May 1707. In 1708 she was under the command of Commander James Stewart, RN (promoted to captain in January 1709) for service with Admiral Byng's Fleet in the Channel and North Sea. In June 1709 Captain Charles Hardy took command though in late 1709 she was under the command of Captain James Hemmington, RN. she took the privateer, Le Chasseur on 24 August 1709.In 1711 she was under the command of Commander Thomas Graves, RN (promoted to captain 1 January 1713) with the Downs Squadron. She took the privateers, Le Temeraire on 6 September 1711 and Le Saint-Jean on 29 July 1712. She was laid up at Plymouth in 1713.

== Disposition ==
HMS Dunwich was sunk as a breakwater at Plymouth by Admiralty Order (AO) October 1714 on 15 October 1714.
