= Hubert de Brienne =

French Navy officer (1690–1777)

Hubert de Brienne, Comte de Conflans
- Born: 1690; Paris, France
- Died: 27 January 1777 (aged 86–87); Paris, France
- Military career
- Allegiance: France
- Branch: French Navy
- Service years: 1706–1777
- Rank: Chef d'escadre
- Conflicts: Battle of Quiberon Bay
- Awards: Marshal of France

Chef d'escadre Hubert de Brienne, Comte de Conflans (1690 – 27 January 1777) was a French Navy officer.

== Early life ==
The son of Henri Jacob marquis de Conflans and Marie du Bouchet, at 15 he was made a knight of the Order of Saint Lazarus and the following year entered the Gardes de la Marine school at Brest. He then served in the War of the Spanish Succession under Duquesne-Guitton (from 1708 to 1709) and Duguay-Trouin (1710), in which he received his baptism of fire, taking part in the capture of two merchant ships.

In 1712, he was made ensign and participated in several anti-pirate operations in the Caribbean and on the Moroccan coast. In 1721, he was sent on a mission to Constantinople, and then in 1723 cruised along the coast of Saint-Domingue and took part in the repression of the troubles there.

== First commands and governor-general of Saint-Dominique ==
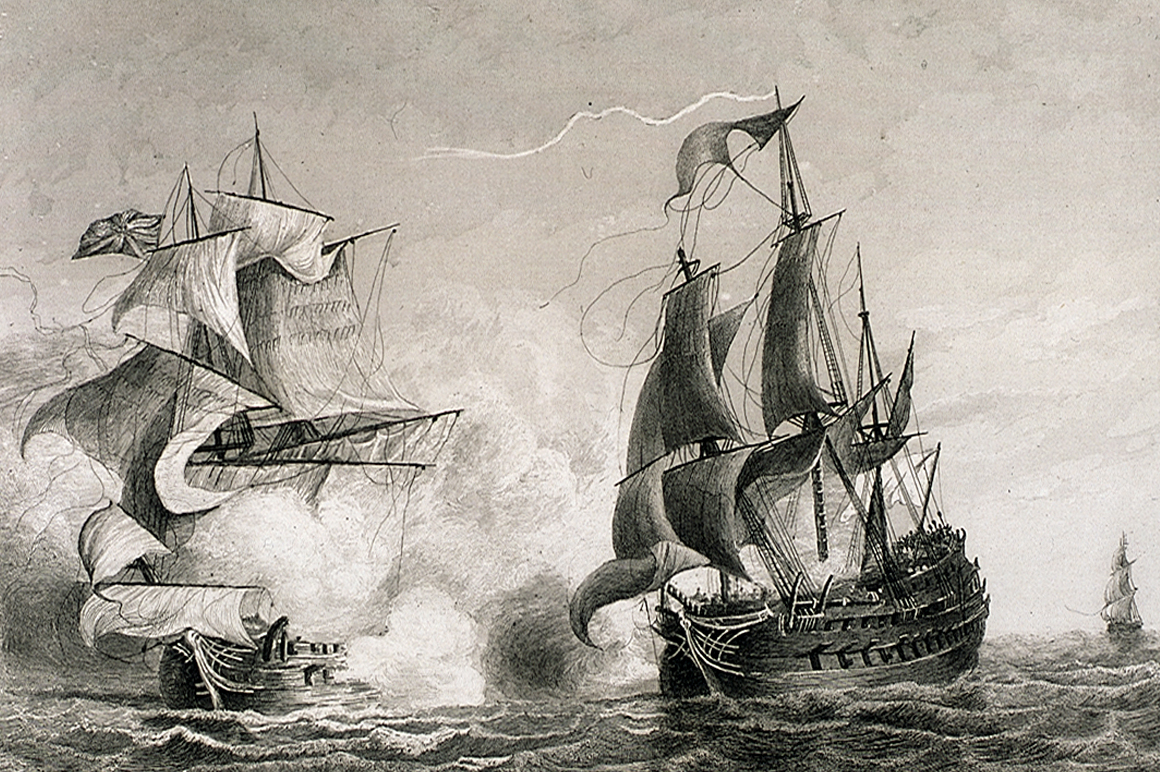
The action of 8 May 1744, at which de Brienne captured HMS Northumberland

He was made lieutenant in 1727 and carried out two campaigns in the Mediterranean. Then, in 1731, he served as lieutenant of the gardes de la Marine at Rochefort. The following year he was made knight of the Order of Saint Louis and from 1733 to 1734 commanded a flotilla charged with guarding the transport of men and munitions to Cayenne and Martinique. That same year, he was promoted to captain, and served again under Duguay Trouin then under the marquis d'Antin during the War of the Polish Succession.

In 1741, he commanded the gardes de la Marine school at Brest, where he had begun his career. Eventually, he was put in command of the Content and captured the British ship of the line HMS Northumberland at the action of 8 May 1744. On board the Terrible he escorted Atlantic convoys. In 1747, he was made governor-general of Saint-Domingue, but on the voyage to take up the post his vessel was engaged by British warships and his ship was captured. He was freed in 1748, thanks to the treaty of Aix la Chapelle, on which he was made "chef d'escadre", a role he held up to 1751. In 1752 he became lieutenant général of the navy.

== Seven Years' War and the battle of Quiberon Bay ==
In 1756 he received the rank of vice-admiral of the Ponant (roughly, the Atlantic fleet). In 1758, King Louis XV made him a Marshal of France in reward for his service.

=== Planned invasion ===
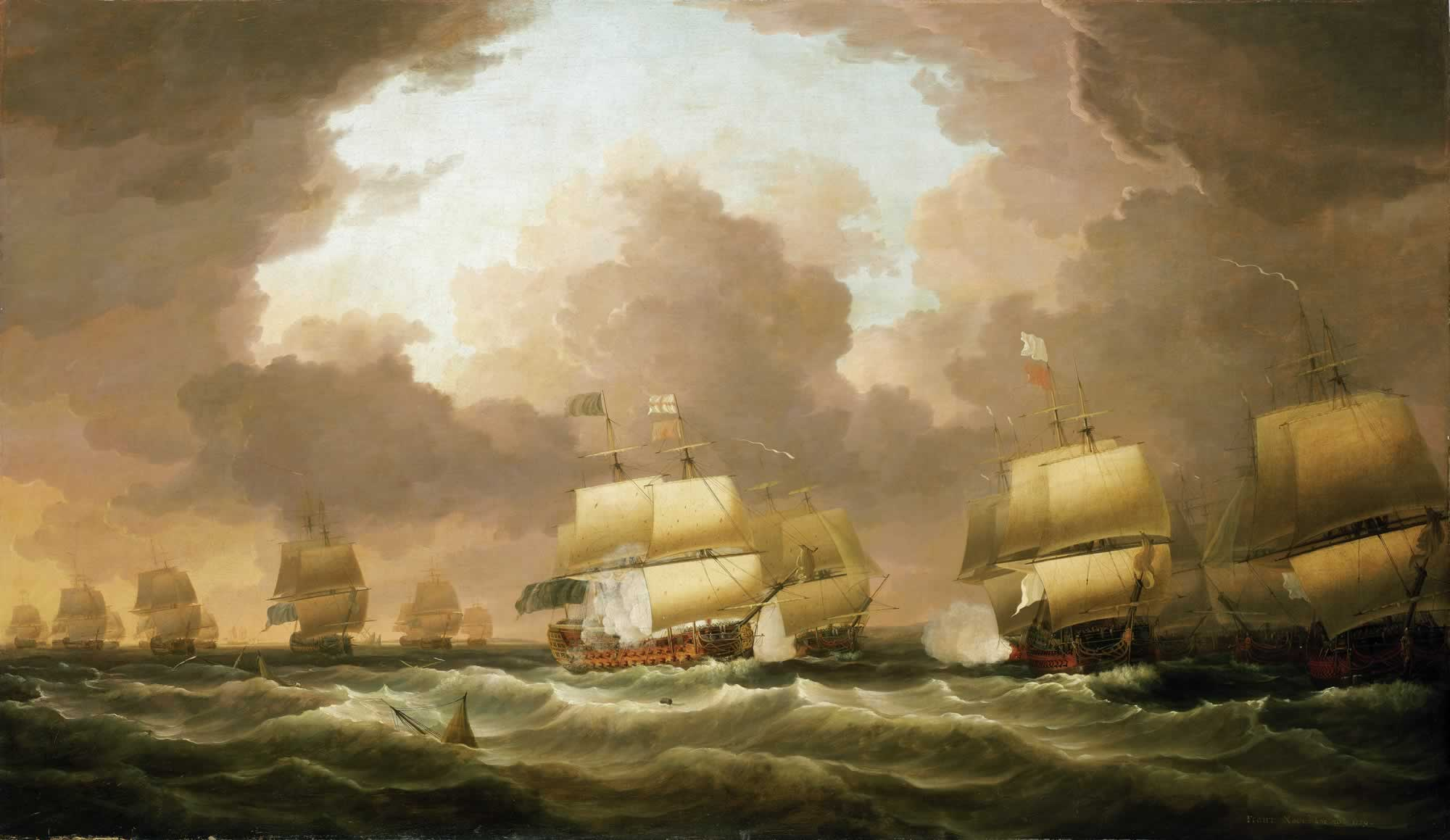
The Battle of Quiberon Bay, which ended Conflans' military career

In 1759, he was put in charge with landing troops in Scotland for an invasion of England organised by Louis XV, Nicolas René Berryer and the marshal of Belle-Isle, and named "le Grand Dessein de débarquement". Command of the expeditionary force was given to Emmanuel-Armand de Richelieu, duc d'Aiguillon. Relations between Conflans and Aiguillon were far from cordial and, in effect, Conflans disagreed with the conduct of the campaign by his superiors and informed the king that he was anxious to avoid battle with the British fleet under Edward Hawke. The fleet was mustered in the gulf of Morbihan, and it was there that Conflans had to start his escort duties. Finally, Hawke momentarily relaxed his blockade of Brest in order to avoid a storm and Conflans got out of Brest on 14 November.

Opposing currents diverted the marshal from his initial route and Conflans did not sight Belle Île until the 20th. Meanwhile, Hawke had been warned of Conflans's departure and moved to block his path. On 20 November on a stormy sea, Conflans sighted Duff's squadron retreating and gave the order to attack it, but shortly thereafter Hawke's fleet sighted Conflans's. Duff then put about so that Conflans turn aside to chase him, thus allowing Hawke to bring his fleet into line of battle and begin pursuing the French fleet. Conflans decided to sail into Quiberon Bay, and engage Hawke there, even though Hawke had caught up with Conflans just as the French fleet began to enter the bay. Hawke nevertheless joined battle and decisively crushed the French fleet, capturing one, destroying three and sinking two. Conflans moved to the safety of a ship in his rear, but night soon put a temporary end to the battle. During the night, Conflans's flagship, the Soleil Royal ran aground, without his knowing, within only a few cable lengths of the British fleet. When dawn rose, he realized the danger that awaited him and sailed across the Croisic to embark on the French vessel Héros. He then burned his flagship after evacuating it. On his return to Brest, Conflans would not only have to explain his defeat but also his burning of his flagship. His choice to engage in the bay of Quiberon was criticized, because it reckoned without the audacity of Hawke. The reasons for his decision to abandon his vessel remain obscure. He was reproached for it at the time.

Disgraced, he passed his last years in Paris where he died in 1777. His post of vice admiral of the Ponant would be given to the Joseph de Bauffremont, his subaltern at Quiberon Bay.
