= Team Northumbria =

Team Northumbria may refer to various sports teams representing Northumbria University. These include:

- Team Northumbria F.C.
- Team Northumbria (netball)
