= HMS Guernsey (1696) =

Ship of the line of the Royal Navy

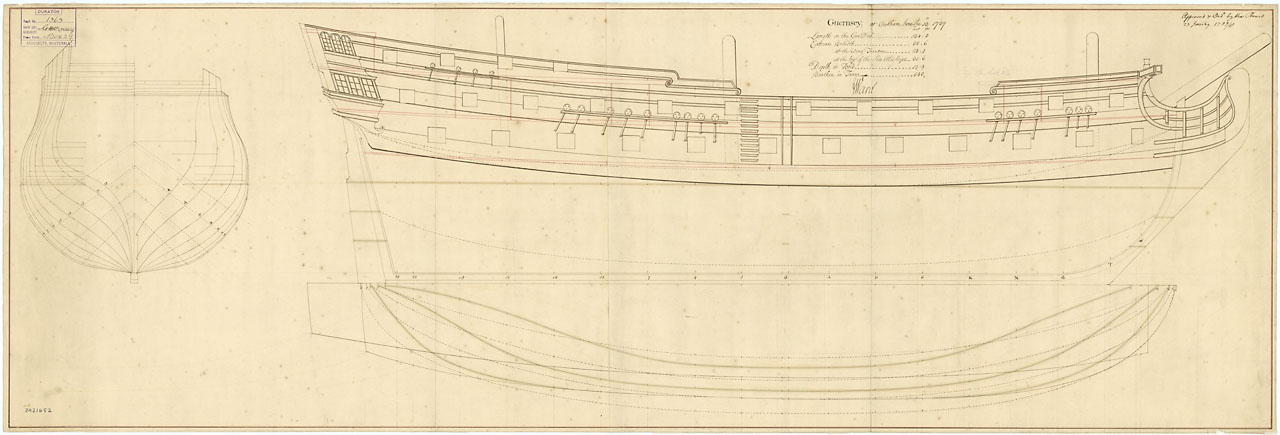
- Plan of the 1740 rebuild

History

Great Britain
- Name: HMS Guernsey
- Ordered: 12 September 1695
- Builder: Sir Henry Johnson, Blackwall Yard
- Launched: 6 July 1696
- Fate: Sold, 2 February 1786

General characteristics as built
- Class & type: 50-gun fourth rate ship of the line
- Tons burthen: 680 12/94 bm
- Length: 131 ft 9 in (40.2 m) (gundeck) 109 ft (33.2 m) (keel)
- Beam: 34 ft 3 in (10.4 m)
- Depth of hold: 13 ft 6 in (4.1 m)
- Propulsion: Sails
- Sail plan: Full-rigged ship
- Armament: 50 guns of various weights of shot

General characteristics after 1717 rebuild
- Class & type: 1706 Establishment 50-gun fourth rate ship of the line
- Tons burthen: 706 5/94 bm
- Length: 130 ft (39.6 m) (on gundeck) 107 ft 4 in (32.7 m) (keel)
- Beam: 35 ft (10.7 m)
- Depth of hold: 14 ft (4.3 m)
- Propulsion: Sails
- Sail plan: Full-rigged ship
- Armament: 50 guns: Gundeck: 22 × 18 pdrs; Upper gundeck: 22 × 9 pdrs; Quarterdeck: 4 × 6 pdrs; Forecastle: 2 × 6 pdrs

General characteristics after 1740 rebuild
- Class & type: 1733 proposals 50-gun fourth rate ship of the line
- Tons burthen: 862 81/94 bm
- Length: 134 ft (40.8 m) (on gundeck) 108 ft 6 in (33.1 m) (keel)
- Beam: 38 ft 8 in (11.8 m)
- Depth of hold: 15 ft 9 in (4.8 m)
- Propulsion: Sails
- Sail plan: Full-rigged ship
- Armament: 50 guns: Gundeck: 22 × 18 pdrs; Upper gundeck: 22 × 9 pdrs; Quarterdeck: 4 × 6 pdrs; Forecastle: 2 × 6 pdrs

HMS Guernsey was a 50-gun fourth rate ship of the line of the Royal Navy, one of four ordered in September 1694 (Blackwall and Guernsey on 12 September and Nonsuch and Warwick on 25 September) to be built by commercial contracts; eight further ships of this type were ordered on 24 December (six to be built by contract and two in Royal Dockyards). The Guernsey was built by Sir Henry Johnson's Blackwall Yard and launched on 6 July 1696.

She was ordered on 16 May 1716 to be rebuilt according to the 1706 Establishment at Woolwich Dockyard, where she arrived on 24 June 1716. Work commenced on 7 September and she was re-launched on 24 October 1717. On 23 February 1737 orders were issued for Guernsey to be taken to pieces and rebuilt again at Chatham Dockyard to the 1733 proposals of the 1719 Establishment. Work commenced in March 1738 and she was re-launched on 11 August 1740, and remained in active service until 1769 when she was hulked, being finally sold for break-up on 2 February 1786.

Guernsey was sold out of the navy in 1786.

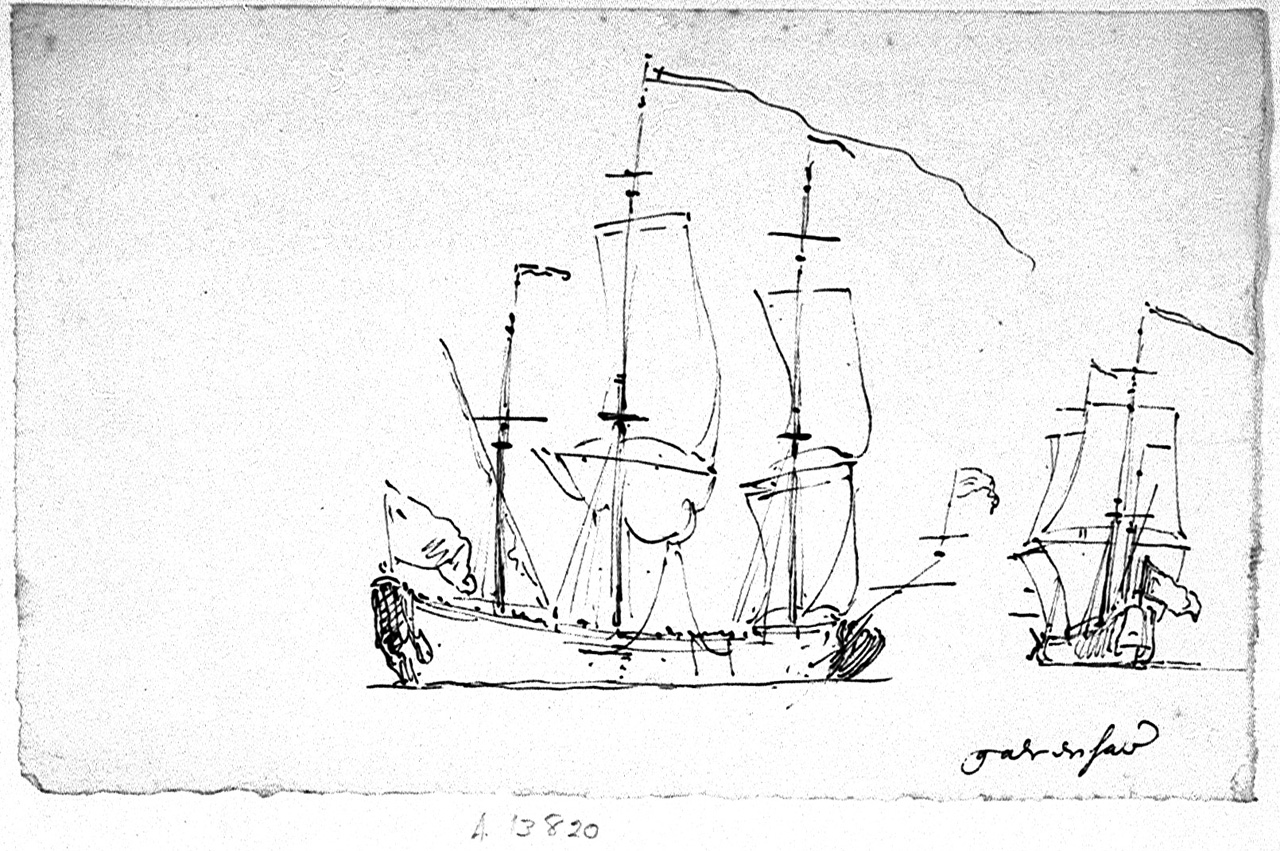
The Guernsey; before a light breeze
