= HMS Devonshire (1692) =

Ship of the line of the Royal Navy

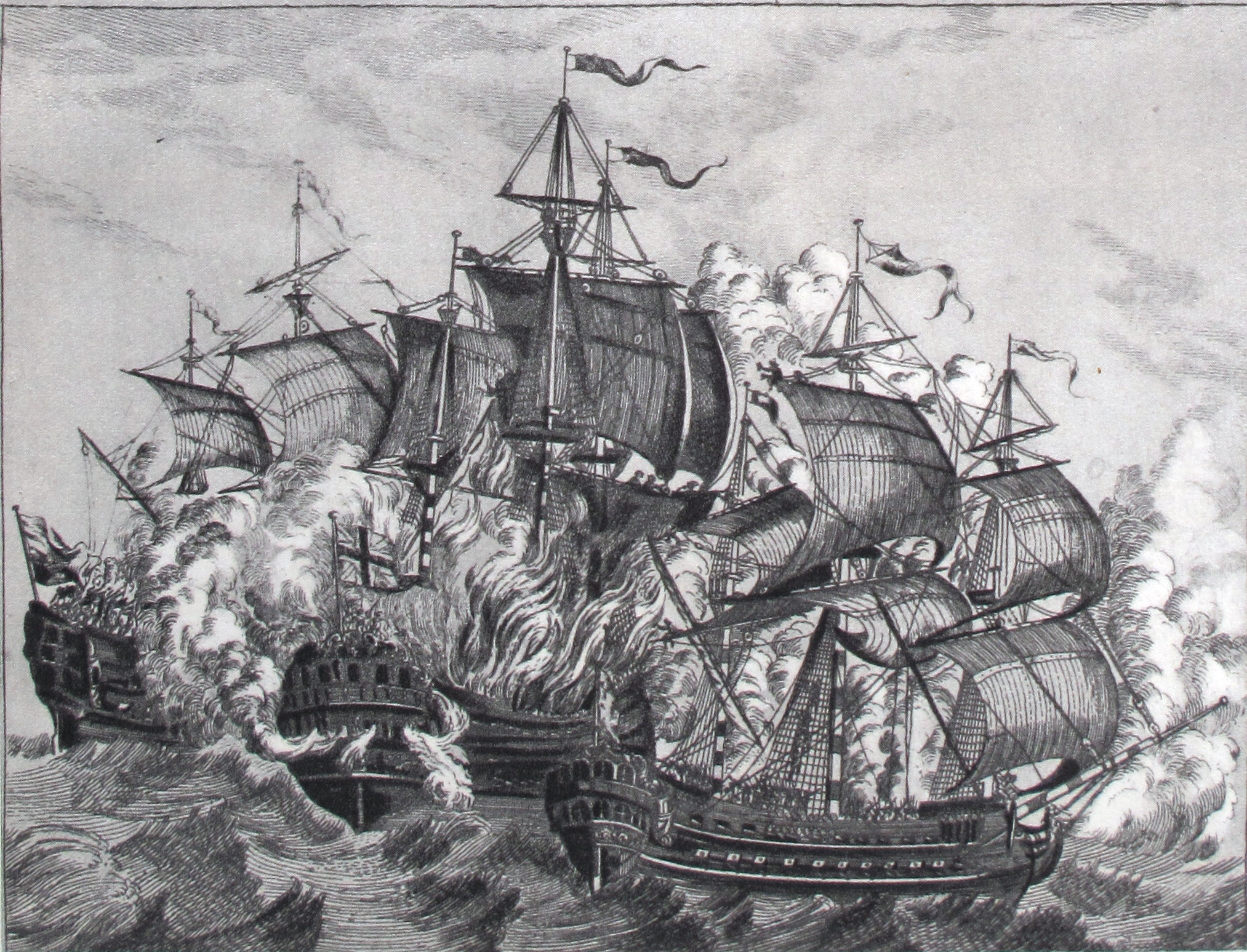
- Devonshire exploding

History

Great Britain
- Name: HMS Devonshire
- Builder: Wyatt, Bursledon
- Launched: 5 April 1692
- Fate: Blown up in action, 1707

General characteristics as built
- Class & type: 80-gun third rate ship of the line
- Tons burthen: 1158 bm
- Length: 154 ft (46.9 m) (gundeck)
- Beam: 41 ft 5 in (12.6 m)
- Depth of hold: 17 ft 4 in (5.3 m)
- Propulsion: Sails
- Sail plan: Full-rigged ship
- Armament: 80 guns of various weights of shot

General characteristics after 1704 rebuild
- Class & type: 80-gun third rate ship of the line
- Tons burthen: 1,220 long tons (1,239.6 t)
- Length: 156 ft (47.5 m) (gundeck)
- Beam: 42 ft 1.5 in (12.8 m)
- Depth of hold: 17 ft (5.2 m)
- Propulsion: Sails
- Sail plan: Full-rigged ship
- Armament: 80 guns of various weights of shot

HMS Devonshire was an 80-gun third rate ship of the line of the Royal Navy, launched at Bursledon on 5 April 1692.

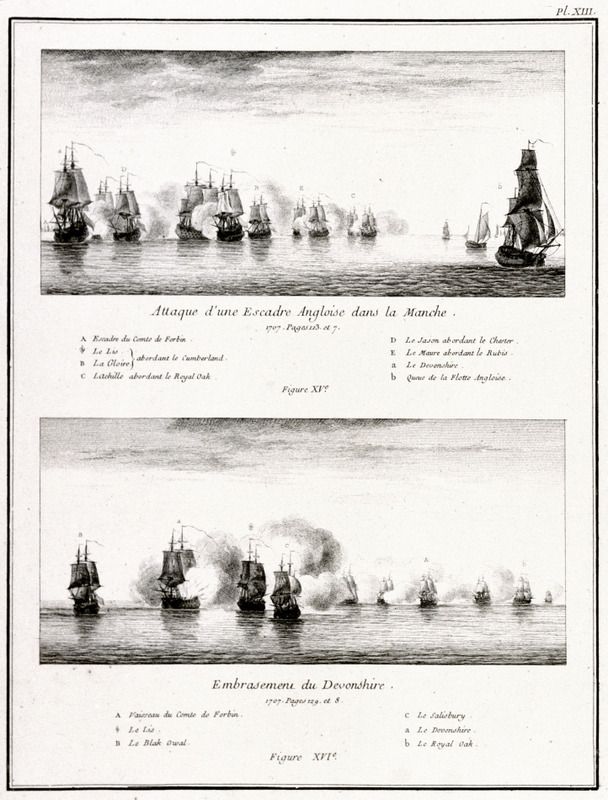
A print published in France shows the Devonshire during the Action of 2 May 1707 off Beachy Head

She was rebuilt at Woolwich Dockyard in 1704, but was destroyed in action in 1707 during the Battle at The Lizard on 21 October.
