= Annibal-class ship of the line =

Class of two 74-gun ships of the French Navy

- Annibal (left) at the Glorious First of June

Class overview
- Name: Annibal
- Builders: Brest
- Operators: French Navy; Royal Navy
- In commission: January 1779 - 1794
- Completed: 2

General characteristics
- Type: ship of the line
- Displacement: 2,939 tonneaux
- Tons burthen: 1,478 port tonneaux
- Length: 54.57 m (179.0 ft) (Annibal); 54.90 m (180.1 ft) (Northumberland)
- Beam: 14.29 m (46.9 ft)
- Draught: 7.2 m (24 ft)
- Propulsion: Sail
- Armament: 74 to 78 guns
- Notes: Ships in class include: Annibal, Northumberland

The Annibal class was a class of two 74-gun ships of the French Navy. The type was one of the first achievements of Jacques-Noël Sané. His first design - on 24 November 1777 - was for a ship of 166 pieds (176 feet 11 inches) length, but he produced an amended design on 10 January 1779 for the Annibal, and a further amended design on 3 March 1780 for her near-sister Northumberland. Both ships were captured during the Fourth Battle of Ushant ("Bataille du 13 prairial an II" or "Glorious First of June") on 1 June 1794 off Ushant, and were added to but never commissioned into the British Navy.

- Annibal

Builder: Brest Dockyard
Ordered: 20 February 1778
Launched: 5 October 1778
Fate: Captured by the Royal Navy on 1 June 1794 and renamed HMS Achille, but broken up at Plymouth in February 1796.

- Northumberland

Builder: Brest Dockyard
Ordered:
Launched: 3 May 1780
Fate: Captured by the Royal Navy on 1 June 1794 and named HMS Northumberland, but broken up at Plymouth in November 1795.
