= Esso Northumbria =

British crude oil tanker

History

United Kingdom
- Name: Esso Northumbria
- Owner: Esso
- Port of registry: London
- Builder: Swan Hunter, Wallsend
- Launched: 2 May 1969
- Sponsored by: Princess Anne
- Completed: 14 May 1970
- Identification: IMO number: 6917530; Call sign: GZJE
- Nickname(s): "Big Geordie"
- Fate: Scrapped in Taiwan in 1982

General characteristics
- Type: Oil tanker
- Tonnage: 126,543 GRT; 254,277 DWT
- Length: 348.5 m (1,143 ft 4 in) o/a; 330.7 m (1,085 ft 0 in) p/p
- Beam: 51.9 m (170 ft 3 in)
- Depth: 25.6 m (84 ft 0 in)
- Propulsion: 2 × Associated Electrical Industries steam turbines, 32,000 shp (24,000 kW), single screw
- Speed: 16 knots (30 km/h; 18 mph)

== History ==
Esso Northumbria was the first of a series of Very Large Crude Carrier ships, built by Swan Hunter at Wallsend on Tyneside, in 1969. When launched on 2 May 1969 by Princess Anne it was the largest vessel to have been built in the United Kingdom at the time.

The ship was designed to carry crude oil from the Persian Gulf, and its large design was a result of the Six Day War, which had resulted in the closing of the Suez Canal. The ship was single-hulled and was designed with relatively limited knowledge of the behaviours of such large structures at sea, being generally a straightforward scaling-up of smaller tanker designs. It was also built to a fixed-price contract at a time when rampant inflation was occurring in Britain. This led to many attempts to cut costs; Swan Hunter ultimately made a loss on the contract. Final cost of the ship's construction were £6.5 million.

The Northumbria was plagued with problems both with its fittings and also, more seriously, with cracking of its hull under stress. The ship needed many repairs throughout its short working lifetime and this, together with fears of a major oil spill, prompted its retirement in 1982 after only 12 years in service. The ship was sailed on its final voyage to Taiwan, where it was broken up for scrap at Kaohsiung. A similar fate befell the Northumbria's sister ship, Esso Hibernia, which was also built on Tyneside and launched in 1970.

== In popular culture ==
The launching of the Northumbria was a major local media event at the time. In 2019, the Canadian folk band The Dreadnoughts released a song called Roll Northumbria, dedicated to the ship which describes an exaggerated account of the Northumbria's short and unfortunate service.
