= HMS Nonsuch (1696) =

Ship of the line of the Royal Navy

History

Great Britain
- Name: HMS Nonsuch
- Ordered: 25 September 1695
- Builder: Robert & John Castle, Deptford
- Launched: 20 August 1696
- Fate: Broken up, 1745

General characteristics as built
- Class & type: 50-gun fourth rate ship of the line
- Tons burthen: 676 77/94 bm
- Length: 130 ft 5 in (39.8 m) (gundeck) 109 ft (33.2 m) (keel)
- Beam: 34 ft 2 in (10.4 m)
- Depth of hold: 13 ft 9 in (4.2 m)
- Propulsion: Sails
- Sail plan: Full-rigged ship
- Armament: 50 guns of various weights of shot

General characteristics after 1716-1717 rebuild
- Class & type: 50-gun fourth rate ship of the line
- Tons burthen: 687 12/94 bm
- Length: 131 ft 2 in (40.0 m) (gundeck) 107 ft 9 in (32.8 m) (keel)
- Beam: 34 ft 7.5 in (10.6 m)
- Depth of hold: 13 ft 7 in (4.1 m)
- Propulsion: Sails
- Sail plan: Full-rigged ship
- Armament: 50 guns of various weights of shot

HMS Nonsuch was a 50-gun fourth rate ship of the line of the Royal Navy, one of four ordered in September 1694 (Blackwall and Guernsey on 12 September and Nonsuch and Warwick on 25 September) to be built by commercial contracts; eight further ships of this type were ordered on 24 December (six to be built by contract and two in Royal Dockyards). The Nonsuch was built by Robert and John Castle at their Deptford shipyard and launched on 20 August 1696.

On 22 June 1715 she was ordered to undergo a major Repair (in effect, a rebuilding) which was undertaken by Master Shipwright John Naish at Portsmouth Dockyard. Work commenced in August 1716 and the ship was re-launched on 29 April 1717. She was not recommissioned until May 1722 after being sheathed for a voyage to the Guinea coast of Africa, for which she sailed in January 1723 under the command of Captain Lord Archibald Hamilton. From there she proceeded to the West Indies, returning to Portsmouth to pay off in July 1724.

The Nonsuch was converted into a hulk in 1740 (with a new ship to be built in her stead), and she continued to serve in this capacity until 1745, when she was broken up.
