= Northumberland Park =

Northumberland Park may refer to:

- Northumberland Park, London, an area of London, UK
- Northumberland Park (ward), electoral ward in London
- Northumberland Park railway station (London), a National Rail station in Northumberland Park, London
- Northumberland Park Depot, a London Underground depot in Northumberland Park, London
- Northumberland Park station (Tyne and Wear), a multimodal station consisting of Metro and National Rail services in North Tyneside, Tyne and Wear, England
- Northumberland Park, Tyne and Wear, an area of Tyne and Wear, UK
- Northumberland Park, North Shields, a public park in North Shields, Tyne and Wear

== See also ==
- Northumberland Provincial Park
- Northumberland National Park, the northernmost national park in England
- Northumberland (disambiguation)
