= French ship Northumberland (1780) =

Ship of the line of the French Navy

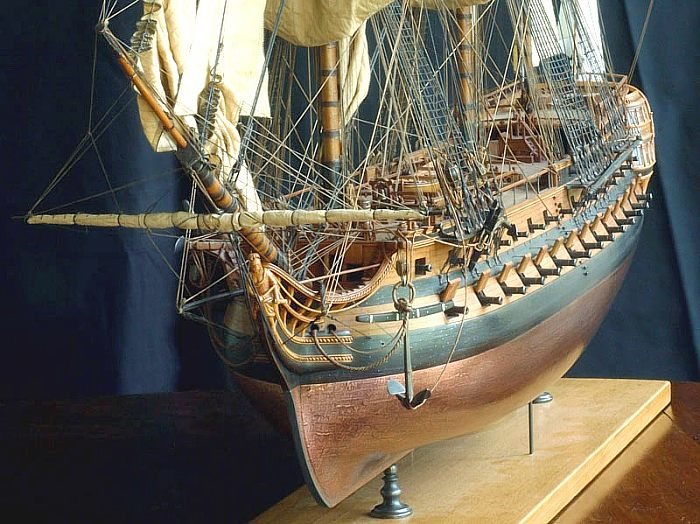
- A 74-gun French ship of the line similar to Northumberland

History

France
- Name: Northumberland
- Namesake: HMS Northumberland, a previous ship captured from the Royal Navy and commissioned in the French Navy
- Laid down: 24 February 1779
- Launched: 3 May 1780
- Commissioned: July 1780
- Honours and awards: Participated in: Battle of the Chesapeake; Battle of the Saintes; Glorious First of June
- Captured: Glorious First of June, by Royal Navy

Great Britain
- Name: Northumberland
- Acquired: June, 1794
- Fate: Broken up, December 1795

General characteristics
- Class & type: Annibal-class ship of the line
- Displacement: 2,939 tonneaux
- Tons burthen: 1,478 port tonneaux
- Length: 54.7 m (179 ft 6 in)
- Beam: 14.3 m (46 ft 11 in)
- Draught: 7.2 m (23 ft 7 in)
- Propulsion: Sails
- Armament: 74 guns of various weights of shot

Northumberland was a 74-gun Annibal-class ship of the line of the French Navy.

== Career ==
She took part in the Battle of the Chesapeake on 5 September 1781 under Bon Chrétien de Bricqueville. Seven months later, she took part in Battle of the Saintes on 12 April 1782 under Captain Cresp de Saint-Césaire, who was killed in the action. The ship was saved by the active help of Swedish officer Henrik Johan Nauckhoff, who was later to become a Swedish admiral and at the time was on leave from Swedish service to gain experience fighting with the French. In 1782, she captured the 14-gun sloop HMS Allegiance.

Northumberland was captured during the Glorious First of June in 1794, where she was captained by François-Pierre Étienne. She was recommissioned in the Royal Navy as HMS Northumberland, and was broken up the next year in December 1795.
