= HMS Gloucester (1709) =

Ship of the line of the Royal Navy

History

Great Britain
- Name: HMS Gloucester
- Builder: Burchett, Rotherhithe
- Launched: 25 July 1709
- Captured: 26 October 1709, by the French

France
- Acquired: 26 October 1709

General characteristics
- Class & type: 1706 Establishment 60-gun fourth rate ship of the line
- Tons burthen: 923 bm
- Length: 144 ft (43.9 m) (gundeck)
- Beam: 38 ft (11.6 m)
- Depth of hold: 15 ft 8 in (4.8 m)
- Propulsion: Sails
- Sail plan: Full-rigged ship
- Armament: 60 guns: Gundeck: 24 × 24-pdrs; Upper gundeck: 26 × 9-pdrs; Quarterdeck: 8 × 6-pdrs; Forecastle: 2 × 6-pdrs

HMS Gloucester was a 60-gun fourth rate ship of the line of the Royal Navy, built at Rotherhithe according to the 1706 Establishment, and launched on 25 July 1709.

Gloucester's career with the Royal Navy was brief, for on 26 October 1709, she was captured by French forces off Cape Clear Island.
