= HMS Stirling Castle (1705) =

Ship of the line of the Royal Navy

History

Great Britain
- Name: HMS Stirling Castle
- Builder: Rosewell, Chatham Dockyard
- Launched: 21 September 1705
- Fate: Broken up, 1771

General characteristics as built
- Class & type: 70-gun third rate ship of the line
- Tons burthen: 1122
- Length: 151 ft (46.0 m) (gundeck)
- Beam: 41 ft (12.5 m)
- Depth of hold: 17 ft 6 in (5.3 m)
- Propulsion: Sails
- Sail plan: Full-rigged ship
- Armament: 70 guns of various weights of shot

General characteristics after 1723 rebuild
- Class & type: 1719 Establishment 70-gun third rate ship of the line
- Tons burthen: 1138
- Length: 151 ft (46.0 m) (gundeck)
- Beam: 41 ft 6 in (12.6 m)
- Depth of hold: 17 ft 4 in (5.3 m)
- Propulsion: Sails
- Sail plan: Full-rigged ship
- Armament: 70 guns: Gundeck: 26 × 24-pdrs; Upper gundeck: 26 × 12-pdrs; Quarterdeck: 14 × 6-pdrs; Forecastle: 4 × 6-pdrs

HMS Stirling Castle was a 70-gun third rate ship of the line of the Royal Navy, built at Chatham Dockyard and launched on 21 September 1705.

On 12 March 1720 orders were issued directing her to be taken to pieces and rebuilt according to the 1719 Establishment at Woolwich, from where she was relaunched on 23 April 1723.

Stirling Castle was converted into a hulk in 1739, and continued to serve in that role until 1771, when she was broken up.
