= HMS Blackwall =

Ship of the line of the Royal Navy

History

England
- Name: Blackwall
- Ordered: 12 September 1695
- Builder: Sir Henry Johnson, Blackwall Yard
- Launched: 6 July 1696
- Captured: 20 October 1705, by the French

France
- Name: Blekoualle
- Acquired: 20 October 1705
- Captured: 15 March 1708, by the British
- Fate: Captured again by French 1709

General characteristics
- Class & type: 50-gun fourth-rate ship of the line
- Tons burthen: 678 44/94 bm
- Length: 131 ft 1.5 in (40.0 m) (gundeck) 109 ft (33.2 m) (keel)
- Beam: 34 ft 2.5 in (10.4 m)
- Depth of hold: 13 ft 7.5 in (4.2 m)
- Sail plan: Full-rigged ship
- Complement: 230 (160 peacetime)
- Armament: 54 guns in wartime (46 in peacetime) comprising; Lowerdeck: 22 × 12-pounders; Upperdeck: 22 × 6-pounders; Quarterdeck: 8 × 6-pounders; Foc's'le 2× 6-pounders

Blackwall was a 50-gun fourth-rate ship of the line of the English Royal Navy, one of four ordered in September 1694 (Blackwall and Guernsey on 12 September and Nonsuch and Warwick on 25 September) to be built by commercial contracts; eight further ships of this type were ordered on 24 December (six to be built by contract and two in Royal Dockyards). The Blackwall was built by Sir Henry Johnson's Blackwall Yard and launched on 6 July 1696.

In September 1705, whilst under the command of Captain Samuel Martin, the Blackwall, along with two smaller vessels, had been ordered to convoy some merchantmen to the Baltic. On 20 October, as Blackwall and her two consorts HMS Sorlings and HMS Pendennis were convoying the return voyage, they encountered a superior French force. All the English ships were captured, Blackwall herself being taken by the French ship Protée. Both Captain Martin and the French commander were killed in the action.

Blackwall was commissioned into the French Navy under the name Blekoualle; she was recaptured on 15 March 1708 but was not taken back into service in the Royal Navy, the decision being taken to have her broken up instead. However, she was captured again by the French in 1709, this time being named Blakoual and used as a privateer, remaining in French service until disposed of in 1720.

== See also ==
- List of ships captured in the 18th century
