= HMS Northumberland (1705) =

Ship of the line of the Royal Navy

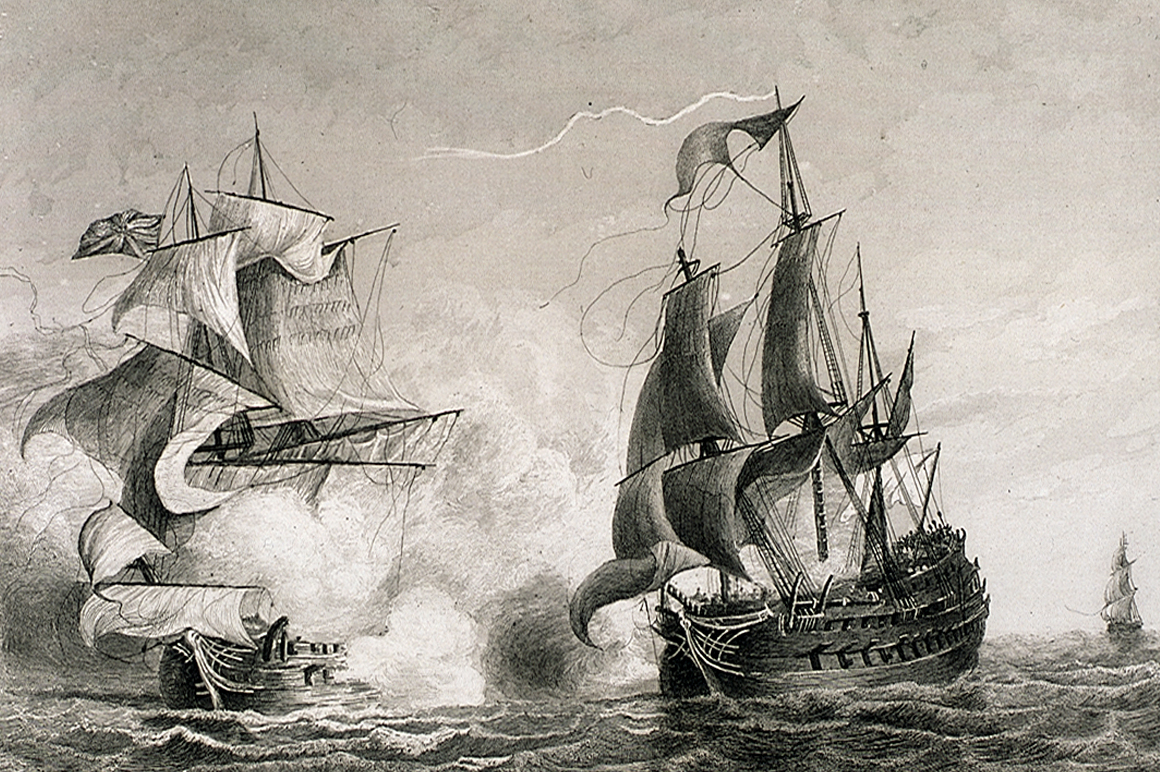
- Northumberland (left) at the action of 8 May 1744

History

Great Britain
- Name: HMS Northumberland
- Builder: Harding, Deptford Dockyard
- Launched: 29 March 1705
- Captured: 8 May 1744, by the French

France
- Name: Atlas
- Acquired: 8 May 1744
- Fate: Sank 1781

General characteristics as built
- Class & type: 70-gun third-rate ship of the line
- Tons burthen: 104123/94 (bm)
- Length: 150 ft 8 in (45.9 m) (gundeck)
- Beam: 41 ft (12.5 m)
- Depth of hold: 17 ft 6 in (5.3 m)
- Propulsion: Sails
- Sail plan: Full-rigged ship
- Armament: 70 guns of various weights of shot

General characteristics after 1721 rebuild
- Class & type: 1719 Establishment 70-gun third-rate ship of the line
- Tons burthen: 10965/94 (bm)
- Length: 151 ft (46.0 m) (gundeck)
- Beam: 41 ft 6 in (12.6 m)
- Depth of hold: 17 ft 4 in (5.3 m)
- Propulsion: Sails
- Sail plan: Full-rigged ship
- Armament: 70 guns: Gundeck: 26 × 24-pdrs; Upper gundeck: 26 × 12-pdrs; Quarterdeck: 14 × 6-pdrs; Forecastle: 4 × 6-pdrs

General characteristics after 1743 rebuild
- Class & type: 1741 proposals 64-gun third-rate ship of the line
- Tons burthen: 1299 bm
- Length: 154 ft (46.9 m) (gundeck)
- Beam: 44 ft (13.4 m)
- Depth of hold: 18 ft 11 in (5.8 m)
- Propulsion: Sails
- Sail plan: Full-rigged ship
- Armament: 64 guns: Gundeck: 26 × 32-pdrs; Upper gundeck: 26 × 18-pdrs; Quarterdeck: 10 × 9-pdrs; Forecastle: 2 × 9-pdrs

HMS Northumberland was a 70-gun third-rate ship of the line of the Royal Navy, built at Deptford Dockyard and launched in 1705.

== British service ==
She was rebuilt twice during her career, firstly at Woolwich Dockyard, where she was reconstructed according to the 1719 Establishment and relaunched on 13 July 1721. Her second rebuild was also carried out at Woolwich Dockyard, where she was reconstructed as a 64-gun third rate according to the 1741 proposals of the 1719 Establishment, and relaunched on 17 October 1743.

Northumberland was captured during the action of 8 May 1744 (Note: Because England still used the Julian calendar at the time, British sources date the engagement to 8 May; French sources, using the Gregorian calendar date the same engagement to 19 May.) by the French ships Mars commanded by Étienne Perier and Content commanded by the Comte de Conflans. She was subsequently taken into the French navy as Northumberland, before being renamed Atlas in 1766.

== Fate ==
She sank in February 1781 off the coast of Ushant.
