= Edward Acton (Royal Navy officer) =

Royal Navy officer (died 1707)

Edward Acton (died 2 May 1707) was a captain in the Royal Navy, distinguished for services in the reign of Queen Anne.

== Life ==
Acton was born in about 1673, the illegitimate son of Mary Acton (née Weaver), widow of William Acton of Buildwas, Shropshire (son of Sir Edward Acton, 1st Baronet). He joined the navy as a volunteer aboard the Diamond in September 1691, was a Lieutenant on the Advice in May 1693 and succeeded to command that vessel following the death of the previous captain on 7 October 1694.

He served at Kinsale in September 1695, before sailing for the East Indies in December that year. Upon his return from this voyage in November 1697, he was suspended from duty due to alleged victualling irregularities and only reinstated three years later on 11 January 1700. He was given command of the Dolphin, the Lyme a year later, and the Bristol in May 1701.

It was as captain of this last vessel that he sailed for the West Indies in 1702, to join the forces commanded by Admiral John Benbow. The following spring he was back, carrying two other captains, Richard Kirkby and Cooper Wade, who had been convicted of failing to follow Benbow's orders in his final engagement. Kirkby was executed by firing squad on the deck of the Bristol in Plymouth Sound on 16 April 1703, Acton having witnessed his will and sat up with him the night before.

In January 1704 Acton was given command of the Kingston, and sailed for the Mediterranean under the command of Sir George Rooke. In August 1704, he took part in the Capture of Gibraltar and in the Battle of Málaga. Kingston lost three officers and sixty crew killed and wounded, before having to drop out of the line having exhausted her ammunition. For this Acton was court martialled, but fully acquitted.

In December 1704, Acton was given command of the Bedford, and took part in the battle of Cabrita Point, the relief of the siege of Gibraltar and the capture of Barcelona. In January 1706 he moved to command the Grafton and took part in the capture of Alicante. He was at Ibiza, Menorca and Mallorca (where he was sent ashore as a hostage during negotiations), before returning to England with Leake in October 1706.

A newly refitted Grafton left the Downs on 1 May 1707 alongside the Royal Oak and the Hampton Court escorting a convoy of merchant ships bound for Lisbon and the West Indies. They ran into a much stronger French force under Claude de Forbin off Dungeness, thus beginning the Action of 2 May 1707. Acton was killed in action and his ship was captured.
