= Andrew Leake =

British naval officer (died 1704)

Captain Sir Andrew Leake
- Died: 13 August 1704 off Málaga, Mediterranean Sea
- Military career
- Allegiance: Kingdom of Great Britain
- Branch: Royal Navy
- Service years: 1688–1704
- Rank: Captain
- Nickname: Queen Anne's handsome captain
- Commands: HMS Roebuck; HMS Fox; HMS James Galley; HMS Greenwich; HMS Lancaster; HMS Canterbury; HMS Hampshire; HMS Torbay; HMS Ranelagh; HMS Grafton
- Conflicts: Nine Years' War; Battle of Bantry Bay; Battle of Beachy Head; Battles of Barfleur and La Hougue; War of the Spanish Succession; Battle of Cádiz; Battle of Vigo Bay; Capture of Gibraltar; Battle of Málaga †
- Awards: Knight Bachelor

Captain Sir Andrew Leake (died 13 August 1704) (Note: Dates are in Old Style) was a Royal Navy officer of the late seventeenth and early eighteenth centuries, who distinguished himself at the Battle of Vigo Bay, during the War of the Spanish Succession. From Lowestoft, Leake joined the navy in 1688 under the patronage of John Ashby. Promoted to commander, Leake fought under Ashby as a supernumerary at the Action at La Hogue in 1692. His services at La Hogue brought him promotion to captain, and a series of commands that culminated in 1702 with Leake joining HMS Torbay. At Vigo Bay later that year Torbay broke the boom protecting a Franco-Spanish treasure fleet, resulting in the capture or destruction of the entire fleet. Leake was knighted for this, and went on to command HMS Grafton at the Capture of Gibraltar in 1704. He was mortally wounded at the Battle of Málaga later the same year.

== Early life ==
Andrew Leake was the son of the Lowestoft merchant Andrew Leake (died 1675) and his wife Deborah née Soaps (died 1704). His date of birth is not recorded. One of Leake's sisters, Margaret, married Captain John Ashby of the Royal Navy. Under Ashby's influence, Leake also joined the navy.

== Naval career ==
=== Initial service ===
French ships are burned at the Action at La Hogue

Leake became a midshipman in 1688, joining Ashby's command, the 48-gun ship of the line HMS Mordaunt. Leake then followed Ashby on board the 64-gun ship of the line HMS Defiance on 11 September. He was promoted to master's mate while serving in Defiance on 1 December of the same year, and subsequently fought at the Battle of Bantry Bay on 1 May 1689. With Ashby then promoted to flag rank, on 16 June Leake was appointed the second lieutenant of his brother-in-law's new flagship, the 70-gun ship of the line HMS Berwick. When Ashby moved to the 90-gun ship of the line HMS Sandwich, Leake moved with him, becoming Sandwich's first lieutenant on 1 May 1690. As such he fought at the Battle of Beachy Head on 30 June.

On 7 August 1690 Leake was promoted to commander. As his first command he was given the 8-gun fireship HMS Roebuck on 17 August. He stayed with Roebuck until 9 January 1691 when he was translated into the 8-gun fireship HMS Fox, which he commanded through the following summer. Around this time Leake was noted in a list of captains by Admiral Edward Russell as:

A young man but good, know little of him ... a good seaman but query whether well affected to the government.

Having left his command of Fox, Leake was not appointed to a new position in 1692. Instead he returned to service with Ashby aboard the latter's flagship, the 100-gun ship of the line HMS Victory. As such Leake was present at the Battles of Barfleur and La Hougue, where at the Action at La Hogue on 23 May he commanded one of the boats sent in to destroy the French fleet that had been beached there. The historians John Knox Laughton and Peter Le Fevre suggest that it was Leake's actions as a supernumerary at La Hogue that brought him to the attention of the Admiralty; because of this he was recommended to several admirals in April 1693, and on 25 June was promoted to post-captain.

=== Post-captain ===
Leake's promotion came with the appointment to take command of HMS James Galley. He stayed in that ship only briefly, moving to the 54-gun ship of the line HMS Greenwich in July 1693. Greenwich returned to port for the winter, and was subsequently sent to serve with several other ships of the line in the entrance to the English Channel. Leake commanded Greenwich until 29 May 1694, when he was moved into the 80-gun ship of the line HMS Lancaster. His string of ship commands continued after this, and on 9 June 1695 he left Lancaster to join the 60-gun ship of the line HMS Canterbury. Leake stayed in Canterbury for his longest period of command yet, leaving her only in January 1698.

With the Peace of Ryswick having come into effect, ending the Nine Years' War, Leake spent the first ten months of 1698 on land. He returned to Lowestoft and spent his time raising funds to help rebuild the almost ruined Lowestoft Church. He was brought back to service on 18 November the same year, with command of the 50-gun ship of the line HMS Hampshire. Appointed a commodore, he was given command of a squadron based at Newfoundland to protect the fisheries there; he commanded it until January 1701, when he sailed home. Hampshire reached the Downs later in the month. There, Leake discovered that his crew had written a round robin to the Admiralty in which they accused him of ill-using them. Leake denounced the claims of his crew, saying that he "always took care to do the sailors justice". He argued that the true motivation of his crew was to avoid having to pay large bills they had accrued to their landladies ashore; if they proved Leake had been abusing them they could be turned over into another ship that would take them away before they were forced to pay up.

=== Vigo Bay and knighthood ===
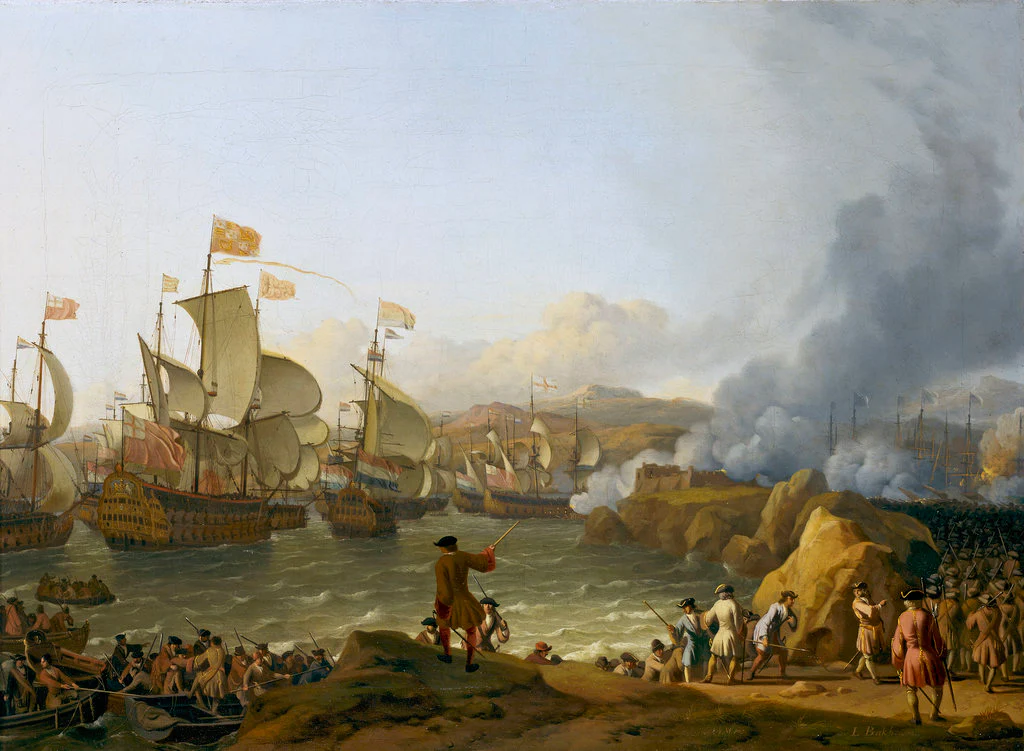
The Anglo-Dutch fleet enters the bay during the Battle of Vigo Bay

The Admiralty sided with Leake against the accusations of his crew. After a brief period serving in the Baltic Sea, in January 1702 he was appointed to command the 80-gun ship of the line HMS Torbay in Admiral Sir George Rooke's fleet. After the beginning of the War of the Spanish Succession Rooke's force was ordered to attack Cádiz in a plan originally created by William III. Having joined with a squadron of Dutch warships and embarked a force of soldiers, the fleet left England on 19 June. The unsuccessful Battle of Cádiz was fought on 12 August, during which Torbay was a supporting ship to Rear-Admiral John Graydon's 90-gun ship of the line HMS Triumph.

Rooke subsequently learned from Captain Thomas Hardy that a Franco-Spanish treasure fleet was at Vigo. On 12 October 1702 they fought the Battle of Vigo Bay, for which Vice-Admiral Thomas Hopsonn transferred his command to Torbay. The treasure fleet was protected by a boom, and Torbay was the lead ship in the attack on it. Advancing towards the fleet while receiving fire from eight French warships, Torbay used a brief strengthening of the wind to break through the boom. The ship became tangled in the broken remnants of the boom, and the two French ships that had been posted as guards at the boom engaged Torbay on either side of her. One of them, the 70-gun Espérance d'Angleterre, cut herself loose from her moorings and Torbay almost ran into the drifting ship, but used an anchor to stop and begin firing from close range into the French ship.

While Torbay engaged the French warship she was also attacked by the fireship Favori, which grappled onto her. Torbay's quarterdeck was set on fire and the deck became so hot that Hopsonn left in his boat to go on board a different ship. Soon after this Favori exploded and sank. She had been carrying aboard her a large amount of snuff, and in the explosion this powder served to put out most of the fire on Torbay, and Leake extinguished the rest, for which action he was especially congratulated. Torbay beat off the attack of Espérance d'Angleterre but then had little fighting left to do, as the remaining warships scuttled themselves or surrendered as more of the Anglo-Dutch fleet made its way past the boom. Torbay was badly damaged in the fight, having 115 men killed or drowned, her sails and rigging mostly destroyed by fire, several gun ports blown off their hinges, and the entire larboard side of the ship heavily scorched. Leake and Hopsonn were both rewarded with knighthoods immediately after the fleet returned to Britain. In February 1703 Leake was translated into the 80-gun ship of the line HMS Ranelagh, serving at the Nore, because Torbay needed to undergo repairs. Some time after this he moved to command Lancaster for a second stint, and then on 3 May he was appointed to command the 70-gun ship of the line HMS Grafton.

=== Gibraltar and Málaga ===
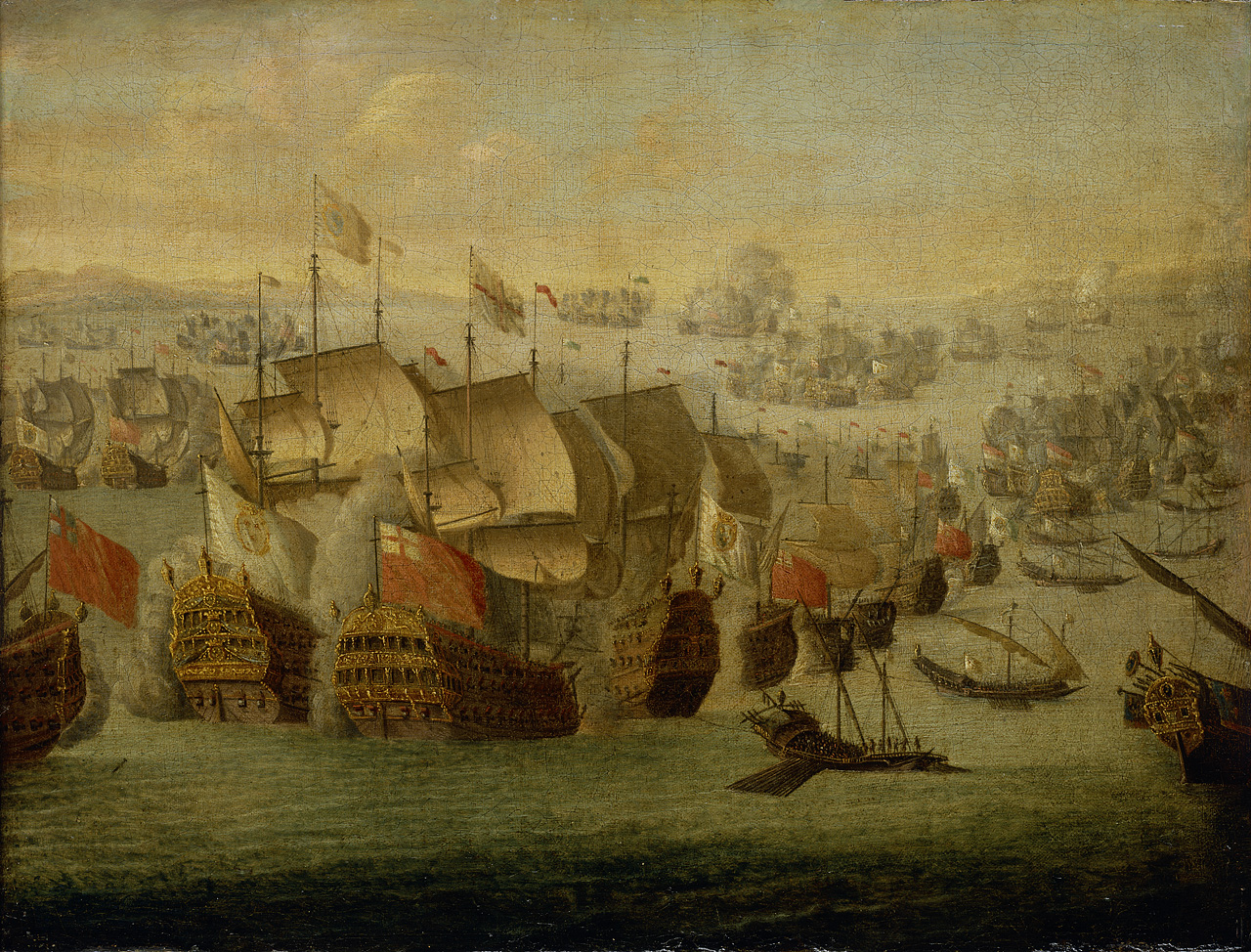
The Battle of Málaga

In Grafton Leake was sent to serve in the Mediterranean Sea under Admiral Sir Cloudesley Shovell. Shovell's fleet left Britain on 1 July 1703, too late in the year to be effective, and it returned in early November. Just before this, on 30 September, Shovell detached Leake from his command with orders to protect British trade sailing from Portugal. For this, Leake was given command over two third rate ships of the line, as well as a fourth rate and two other warships. He first sailed to Lisbon before collecting further merchant traffic from Porto, at which point his force returned home, arriving in the Downs on 17 November and thus just missing the great storm of 1703.

In the following year Leake returned to the Mediterranean in a fleet commanded by Rooke. On 8 May the fleet encountered six French warships off Cartagena; Rooke ordered eight of his ships, including Grafton, to chase them. As this force went after the French ships two of the British began to lag behind and, seeing this, one of the leading British ships began to leave off the chase, believing the odds were now too unfavourable. Grafton was further behind in the chase, and Leake then fired a signal gun for the captains of the other ships to come aboard his ship, despite him not being the senior officer. This ended the chase of the French warships, as the British stopped to heed Leake. Leake was subsequently accused of disobeying his orders and was court martialled, but honourably acquitted. He was subsequently detached to Morocco where he assisted in concluding a peace treaty with that nation.

By July 1704 Leake had returned to the fleet, and on 22 July Grafton formed part of Rear-Admiral George Byng's squadron that attacked and captured Gibraltar. The ships were used to bombard the Gibraltar defences during the attack, diverting fire from the land forces, and Grafton used up much of her ammunition fulfilling this role. The fleet then sailed to Tetuan to replenish its stocks of food and water, and subsequently returned to Gibraltar where a French fleet was then spotted. Rooke initially failed to engage the enemy, but after pursuing them for several days on 13 August they fought the Battle of Málaga. Grafton led the attack of the vanguard red squadron in the engagement, despite the ship having very limited ammunition left. Soon after 10 am. Leake was mortally wounded; he was carried down to the ship's surgeon where his wound was dressed. He then had a table cloth wrapped around his body and, sitting in an armchair, was carried back up to his quarterdeck. Severely weakened by his injury, Leake continued to sit in the chair and died on his quarterdeck soon afterwards. Grafton had thirty-one men killed and a further sixty-six wounded in the victorious battle.

Leake's will of March 1703 left his estate to his mother, who had remarried after the death of his father, while his brothers and sisters received varying amounts of money.
