= Peirson Lock =

British shipbuilder and designer (c. 1690–1755)

Peirson Lock (c.1690–1755) was a shipbuilder and designer for the Royal Navy who was Master Shipwright of Plymouth Dockyard from 1726 to 1742, and of Portsmouth Dockyard from 1742 to 1755.

== History ==
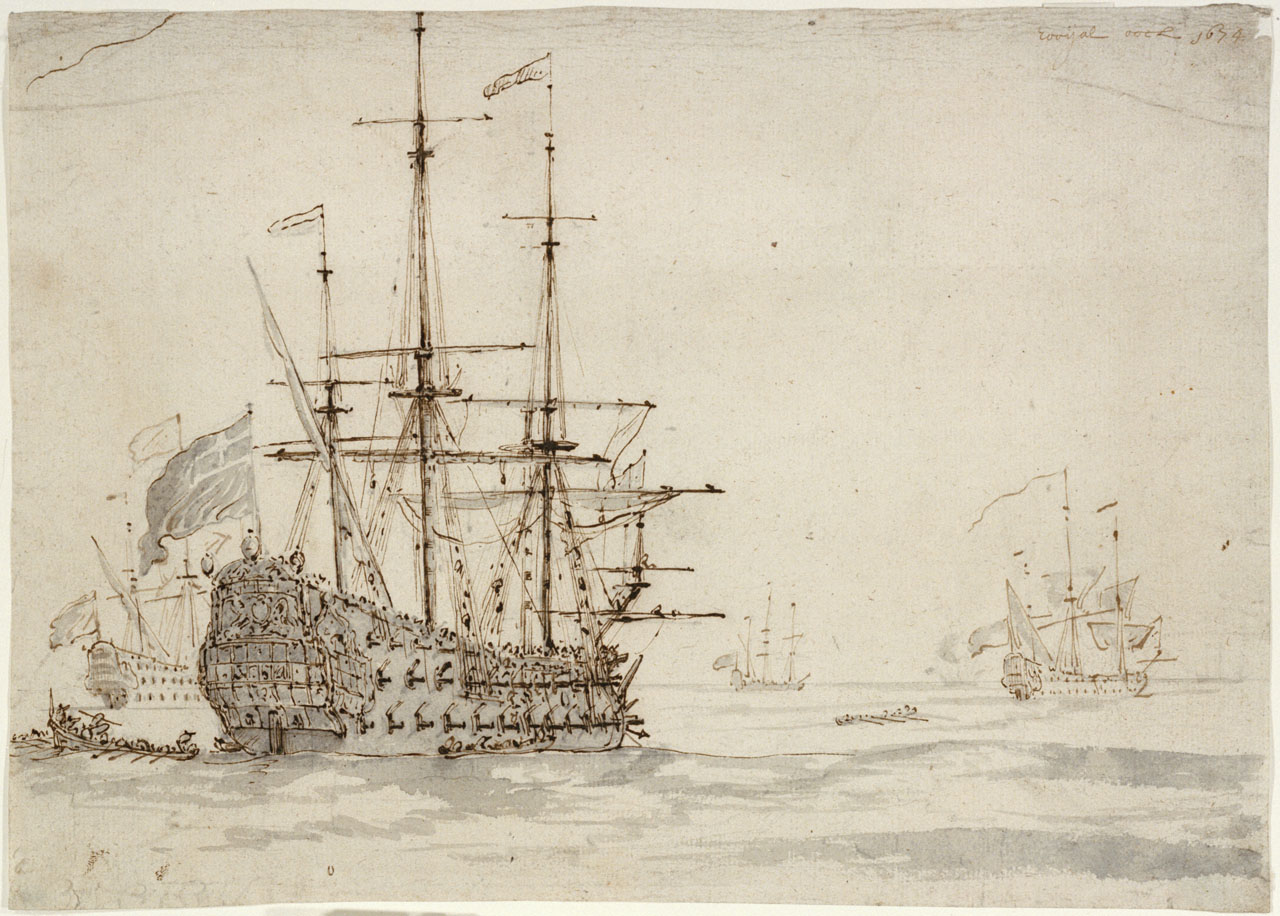
HMS Royal Oak

He was born around 1690. In 1716 he was as Assistant Master Shipwright at Plymouth Dockyard under John Phillips, Master Shipwright. In 1718 he transferred to Portsmouth Dockyard before returning to Plymouth in December 1726 to replace Phillips as Master Shipwright. Thereafter the Royal Navy records his works. In July 1742 he transferred from Plymouth to Portsmouth Dockyard.

In 1749 he designed the Wasp-class sloop and in 1752 designed the Fly-class sloop. He died on 15 December 1755 at Portsmouth Dockyard. His will was read on 22 January 1756 and is now held at the National Archive in Kew.

== Ships built ==
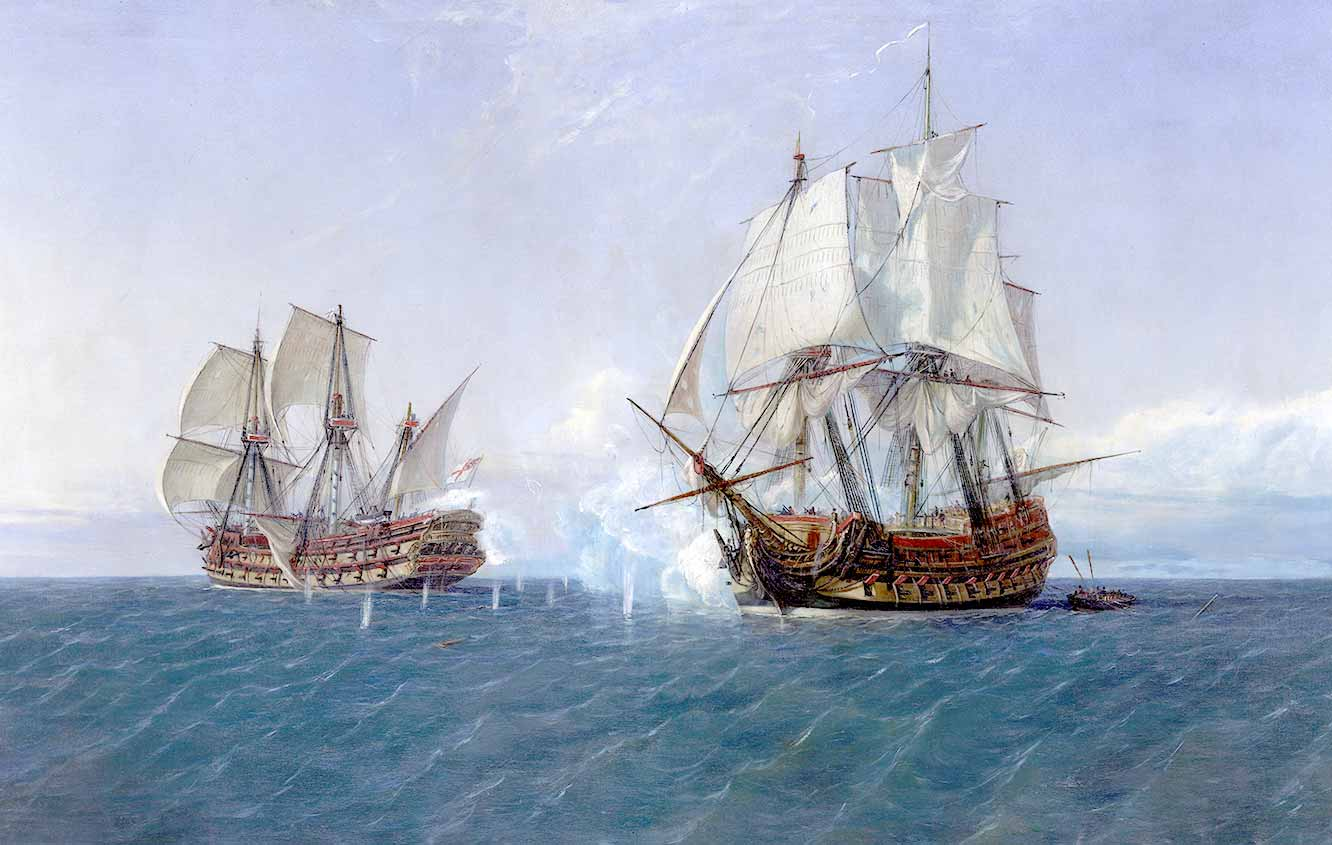
HMS Mary engaging Catalan

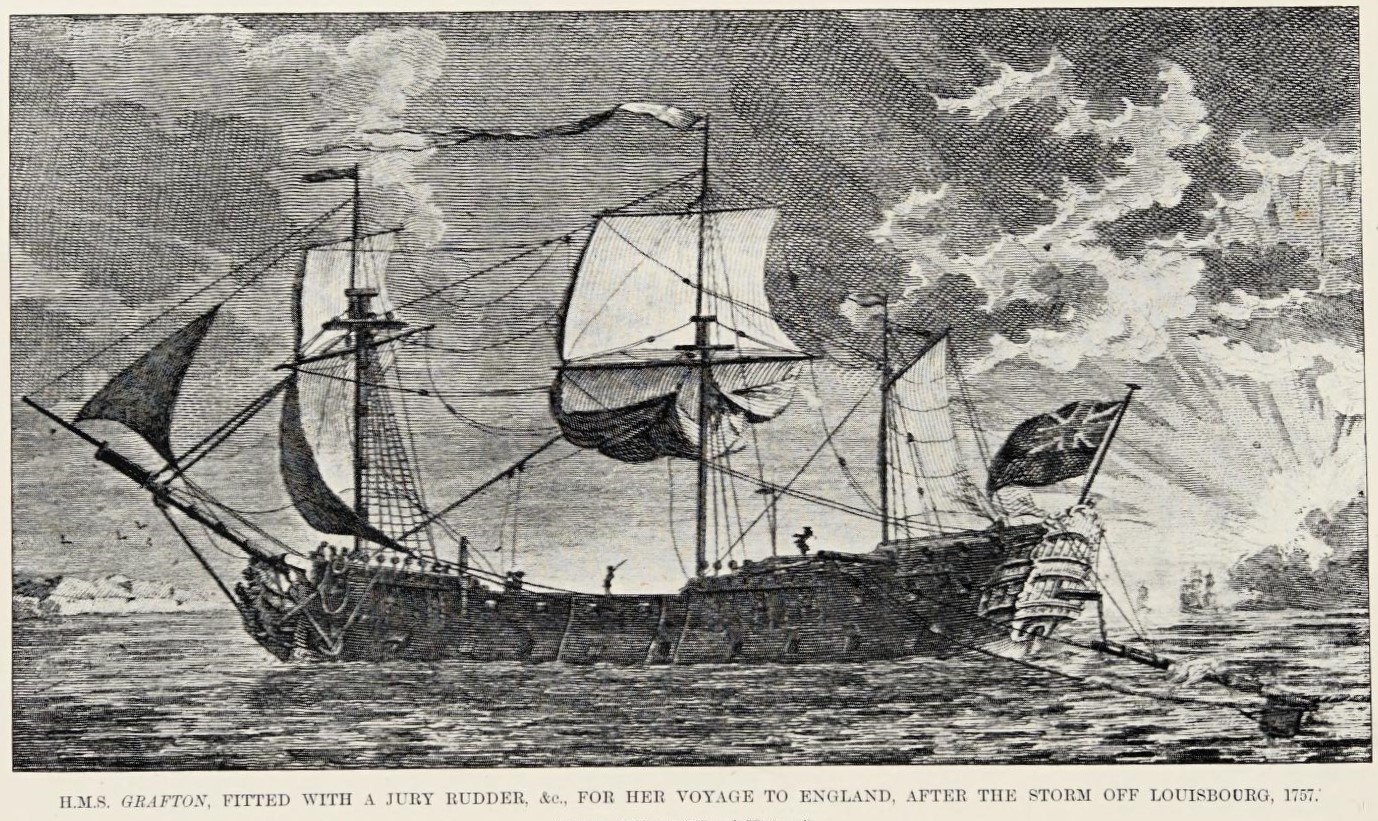
HMS Grafton

- HMS Mary Galley (1687) (rebuilt in 1726) 40-gun ship at Plymouth
- Drake (1727), 2-gun yacht at Plymouth
- HMS Experiment (rebuilt 1727) 20-gun frigate at Plymouth
- Betty smack (1728) at Plymouth
- Mary (1728) yacht at Plymouth
- HMS Lichfield (1730) 50-gun ship of the line at Plymouth
- HMS Saltash (1732), 8-gun sloop at Plymouth
- HMS Swallow (1732) 60-gun ship of the line at Plymouth
- HMS Warwick (1733) 60-gun ship of the line at Plymouth (sister to HMS Swallow)
- HMS Weymouth (1736) 60-gun ship of the line at Plymouth
- HMS Jersey (1736) 60-gun ship of the line at Plymouth (sister to HMS Weymouth)
- HMS St Albans (1737) 50-gun ship of the line at Plymouth
- HMS Severn (1739) 50-gun ship of the line at Plymouth
- HMS Kingston (1740) 60-gun ship of the line at Plymouth
- HMS Royal Oak (rebuilt 1741) 70-gun ship of the line at Plymouth
- HMS Solebay (1742) 20 gun ship at Plymouth
- HMS Princess Mary (1742) 60-gun ship of the line at Portsmouth
- HMS Sunderland (1744) 60-gun ship of the line at Portsmouth
- HMS Mediator (1745) refit of a captured American ship
- HMS Tilbury (1745) 58-gun ship of the line at Portsmouth
- Wasp, 8-gun sloop (1749)
- Hazard, 8-gun sloop (1749)
- HMS Grafton (1750) 68-gun ship of the line at Portsmouth
- HMS Newcastle (1750) 50-gun ship of the line at Portsmouth
- Fly, 8-gun sloop (1752)
- HMS Chichester (1753) 68-gun ship of the line at Portsmouth
- HMS Gibraltar (1754) 20-gun ship at Portsmouth
