= Charles Wager =

English Royal Navy officer and politician

Admiral The Right Honourable Sir Charles Wager
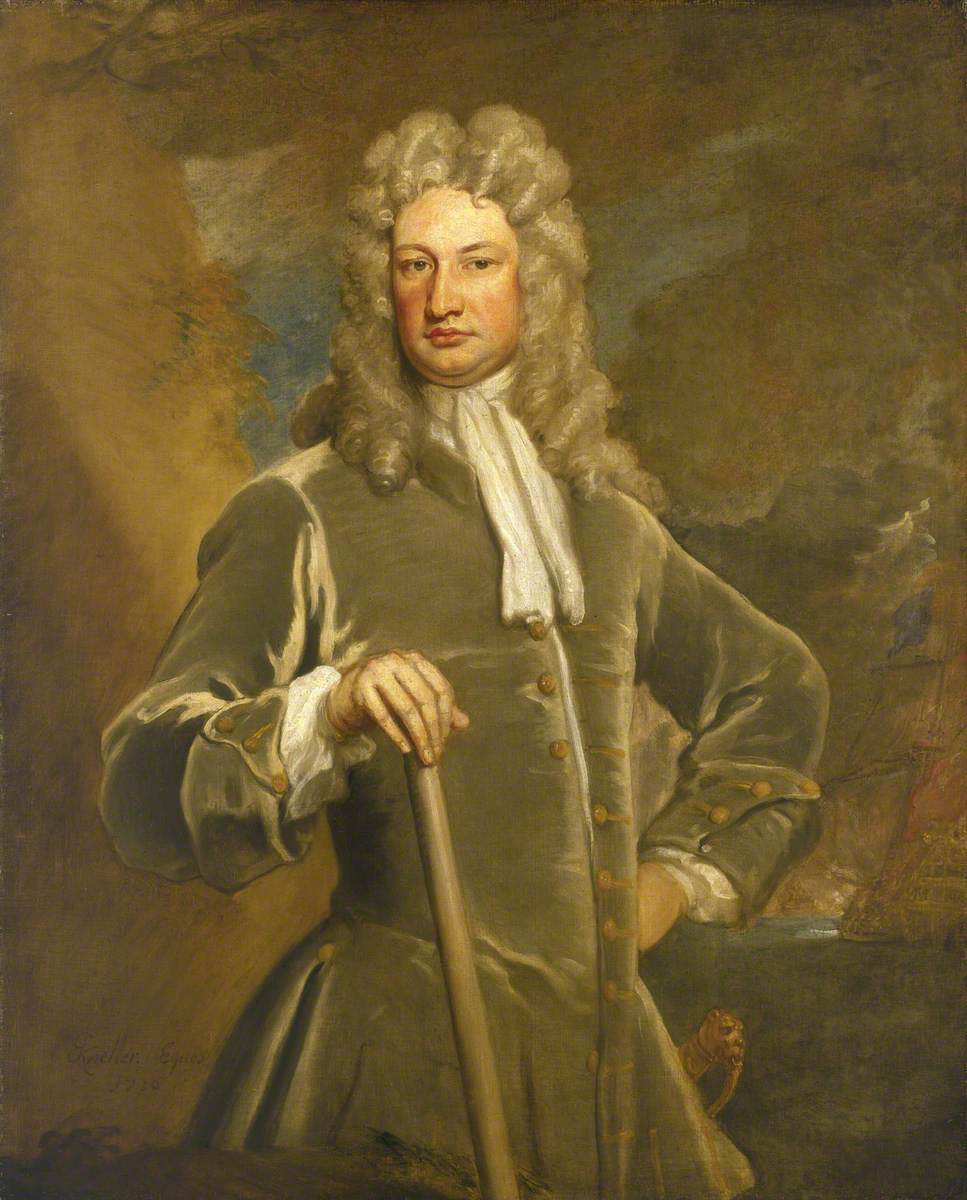
- Portrait by Sir Godfrey Kneller, 1710
- Born: 24 February 1666; Rochester, Kent
- Died: 24 May 1743 (aged 77); Stanley House, Chelsea, London
- Military career
- Allegiance: England; Great Britain
- Branch: Royal Navy
- Service years: 1689–1743
- Rank: Admiral of the White
- Commands: Samuel and Henry; Newcastle; Woolwich; Greenwich; Medway; Hampton Court; Jamaica Station; Baltic Fleet
- Conflicts: War of the Spanish Succession; Anglo-Spanish War

Admiral of the White Sir Charles Wager, PC (24 February 1666 – 24 May 1743) was an English Royal Navy officer and politician who served as Senior Naval Lord from 1730 to 1733 and then as First Lord of the Admiralty from 1733 to 1742. Despite heroic active service and steadfast administration and diplomatic service, Wager was criticized for his failure to deal with an acute manning problem.

== Early life ==
Britannia under sail with other men-of-war, in a 1683 painting by Isaac Sailmaker

He was born in Rochester, Kent, after the death of his father Captain Charles Wager (b. 1630), on 24 February 1666. His father had started life in the merchant service and then gained advancement in the navy of the Commonwealth. His mother was Prudence (b. 1640/41), daughter of Vice-Admiral William Goodsonn, who became a renowned officer in the navy of the time. Wager remarked in 1731, "On both sides I am related to the navy". His paternal grandfather was John Wager (died 1656 when captain of the Greyhound which blew up in action with Spanish pirates) of St Margaret's, Rochester, who became a mariner after migrating from Charlton Kings, Cheltenham.

His father commanded the Yarmouth in the fleet that brought Charles II to England and quickly proved to be a capable, trustworthy, well-liked officer of the Royal Navy. He dined at the home of Samuel Pepys who remarked in his diary "A brave, stout fellow this Captain is, and I think very honest.". Two years after the elder Wager's death, Samuel Pepys heard a friend who had been at Tangier contrast his conduct with that of others who had served in the Strait of Gibraltar, remarking, as Pepys noted, "that above all Englishmen that ever was there, there never was any man that behaved himself like poor Charles Wager, whom the very Moores do mention with teares sometimes". Prudence remarried after his father's death to Alexander Parker, a Quaker and London merchant. There was already an older sister, Prudence, and the marriage produced six more children.

Wager was apprenticed to a Quaker merchant captain of New England named John Hull of Barnstable, Massachusetts who operated a transatlantic shipping service. Wager's mother was a witness when John Hull married Alice Teddeman in the London Quaker Meeting in 1684. When Dr Teddeman Hull, their oldest son, visited London in 1742 he had a letter of introduction from Governor Richard Ward of Rhode Island which stated that he was "the son of Captain John Hull, late of this colony, under whom Sir Charles Wager was educated". It was while working with the Quaker John Hull that Wager displayed the strength of character that ultimately brought him to the attention of the Navy. During one of many transatlantic voyages the vessel which Hull was commanding with Wager as understudy was waylaid by a French privateer and told to "strike". Hull could not fight due to his religious convictions but equally was loath to surrender his valuable vessel and cargo and so he turned to his right-hand man. The young Wager did not share his patron's religion and had no such compunctions, and so it was Wager, "who accepted the encounter, and falling to work with the Frenchman, soon obliged him to sheer off."

== Early naval career (1689–1709) ==
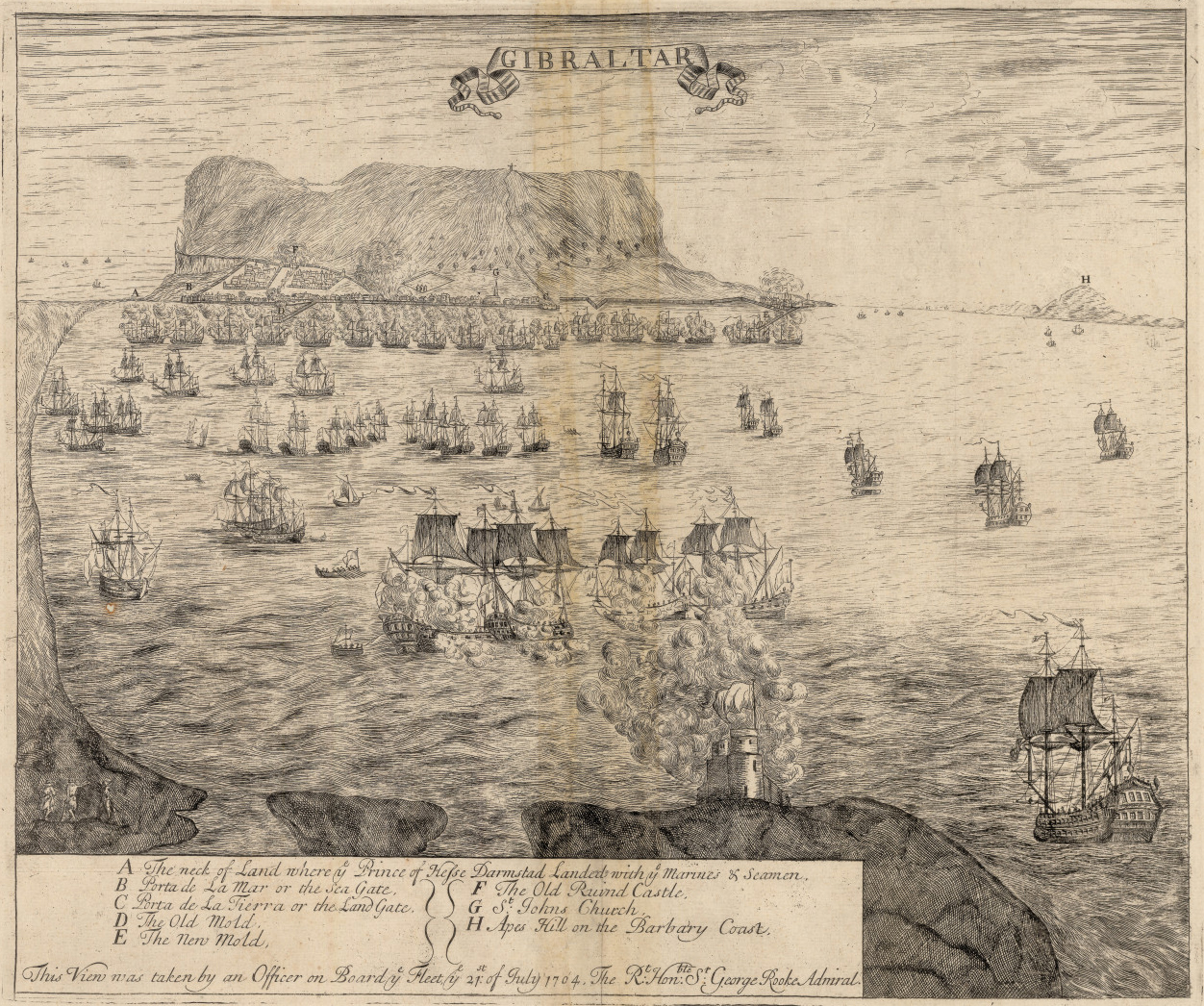
Sketch of Gibraltar by an officer of Admiral Rooke's fleet on 1 August 1704

The earliest record of Wager's naval service is his listing as lieutenant of the frigate Foresight on 1 August 1689. By 1691 he had become first lieutenant of the Dreadnought (64 guns). On 8 December that year he married Martha Earning (b. 1664×6, d. 1748), daughter of Anthony Earning, a Commonwealth navy captain who went into the East India Company's service after 1660 and died while captain of the George in the Indian Ocean. Wager was in the Britannia, Admiral Edward Russell's flagship, in 1692, took part in the battle of Barfleur, and was made post captain on 7 June.

The year 1693 saw Wager in command of the Samuel and Henry (44 guns), in which he convoyed the New England trade. He was captain of the Newcastle (48 guns) in 1694, and in 1695, after a month in the Mary, he was reassigned to the Woolwich (54 guns). In early March 1696 the Woolwich was watching Dunkirk against a rumoured invasion. A month later Wager moved to the Greenwich (50 guns) and commanded a small squadron for convoying the tobacco trade home from the Chesapeake. He stayed in the Greenwich until she was paid off in late 1699. He lived at Watergate cottages, Kilminorth near West Looe on half pay whilst his ship was under repair in Plymouth. He immediately became a freeman of that borough. As he informed the Admiralty in June 1700, his residence was only "about ten miles from his Majesty's Yard at Plymouth" and he could "be at London in four or five days, if required". Eight months later, in February 1701, he was appointed to the Medway (64 guns). In the mobilization of January 1702 for the War of the Spanish Succession he was assigned to the Hampton Court (70 guns) and remained her captain for the next five years. He commanded a squadron of four of the line and two frigates that cruised between Cape Barfleur and the Isle of Batz in early 1703. Later that year he went to the Mediterranean and in October he came under the command of Admiral George Byng (later Lord Torrington). Captains Wager and John Baker were the men Byng sent ashore to carry out negotiations and witness the signing of the England's re-negotiated treaty with the Dey of Algiers. Going again to the Mediterranean in 1704, Wager was with the fleet under Sir George Rooke that captured Gibraltar. The Hampton Court was on detached service and missed the battle off Malaga, but she was present at the capture of Barcelona in 1705. After wintering with Sir John Leake's squadron at Lisbon, Wager took part in the relief of Barcelona and the winning over of Ibiza and Majorca before returning home with Leake in later in 1706.

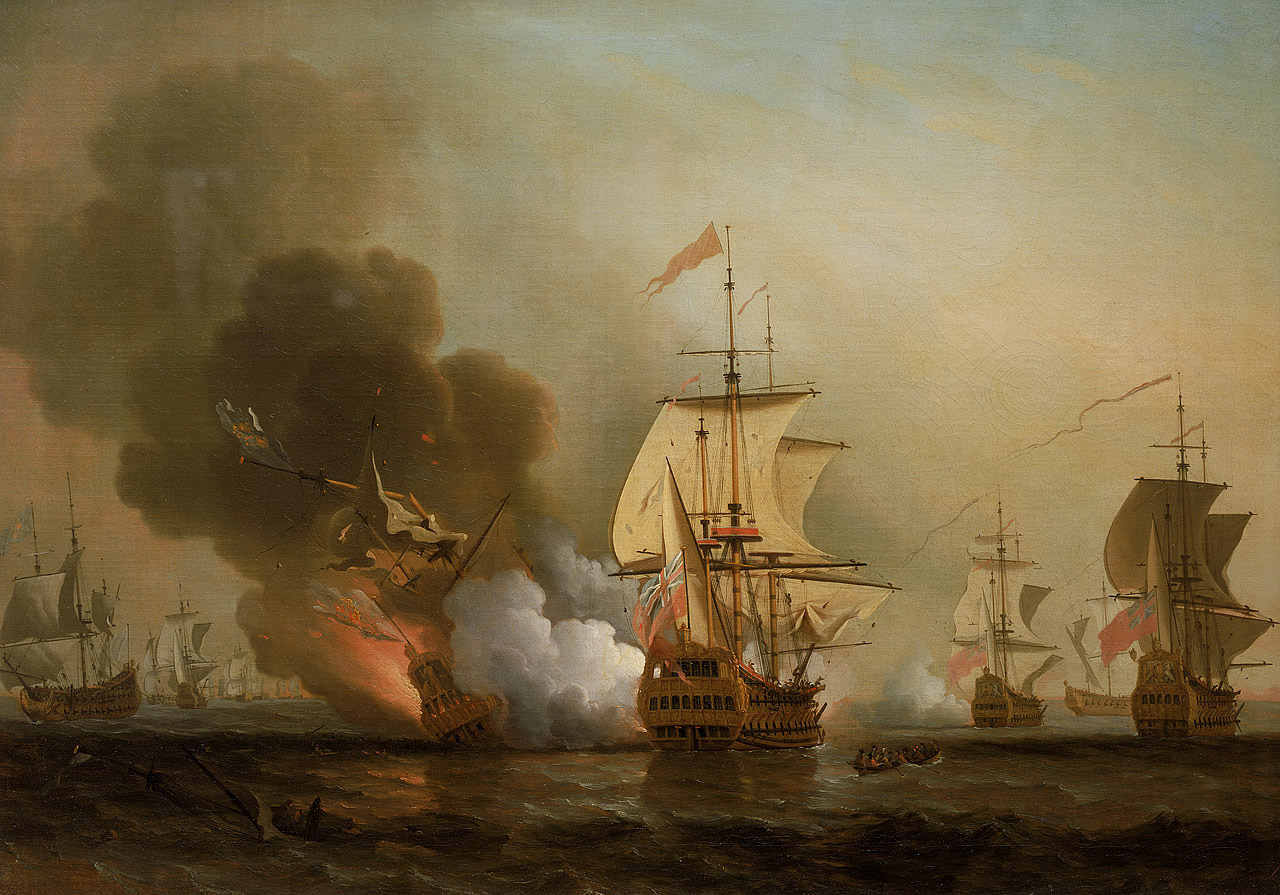
Wager's Action off Cartagena by Samuel Scott

As a senior captain, who had commanded detached squadrons, Wager was a logical choice for the Jamaica station. Appointed in January 1707, he left Spithead in the Expedition (70 guns) on 28 March and reached Jamaica on 22 June. A French squadron under Admiral Ducasse was known to be coming from Europe, and Wager's initial deployments were designed to gain intelligence of its arrival and protect trade. He learned in December that Ducasse had gone to Havana, far to leeward; thus the French squadron (ten of the line) could neither surprise Jamaica nor shield the galleons of the Spanish treasure fleet at the isthmus, and if those galleons were to follow their usual practice of returning to Cartagene de Indias before proceeding to Havana, Wager would have a chance to intercept them after they loaded Peruvian silver at Portobelo. The Expedition (70 guns), Kingston (60 guns), and Portland (50 guns) plus a fireship left Port Royal in time to attain, on 23 May 1708, a position about 36 miles west of Cartagena. There followed the action which was later called Wager's Action, in which one treasure ship was destroyed and one was captured, while the others escaped into Cartagena harbour. The proceeds of his capture meant that he returned to England a rich man. He also came home a rear-admiral, the promotion having occurred by seniority on 19 November 1707. His wealth stemmed chiefly from the silver on the captured galleon, its value estimated at over £60,000 in addition to his flag share of other prizes taken in the West Indies. The action against the galleons made him a hero and he was knighted on 8 December 1709. At Portsmouth he was nominated for a by-election to parliament and was elected on 23 January 1710.

== Admiral and diplomat ==
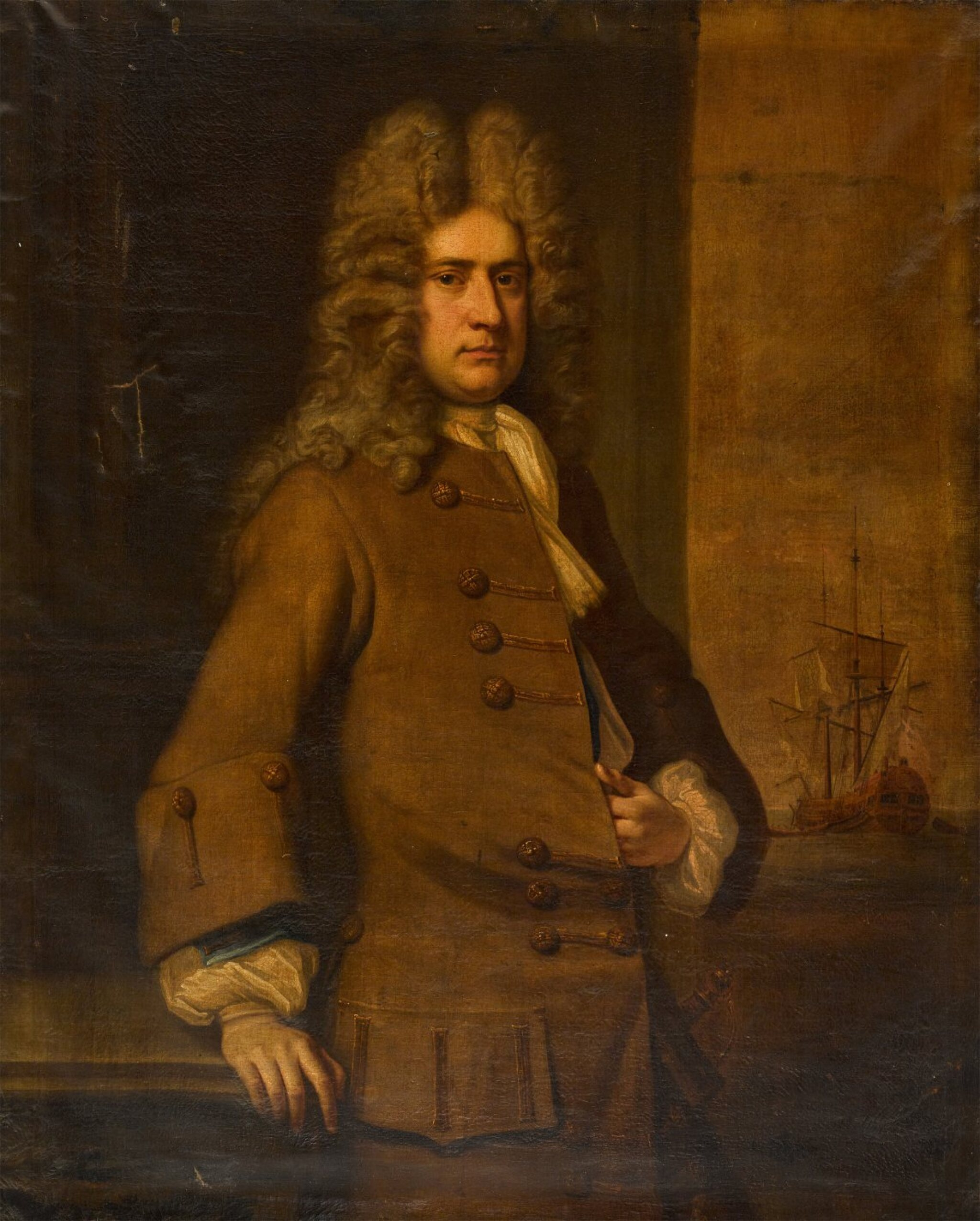
Portrait of Wager by Thomas Gibson

Despite a Tory landslide in the election of 1710 Wager was re-elected to the Portsmouth seat, but the Tory-dominated house overturned the result on petition. As a firm Whig he could no longer expect an important command so he prepared to spend the rest of his life ashore in contrast to the previous twenty years of almost continual sea service. Although there is no record of his residing again at Kilminorth he served as MP for West Looe from 1713 to 1715.

Following the death of Queen Anne, Wager was still listed as a Rear Admiral and he was ordered to take charge of the ships at Portsmouth, and in later to go out to the Strait of Gibraltar and assume command of the Mediterranean Fleet. However, he opted to become Comptroller of the Navy and three years later, in March 1718, he moved to the Board of Admiralty, serving under the Second Stanhope–Sunderland ministry and then the Walpole–Townshend ministry, where he remained for 24 years, almost to the end of his life. In 1720 Wager leased Hollybush, a stately brick house, situated at the south-east corner of Parson's Green, Fulham. He remained on the list of admirals and advanced by seniority. In 1722 he was appointed to take a squadron to Lisbon but the mission was cancelled. His flag was eventually hoisted again in 1726 to take command of the large Baltic Fleet sent to the Baltic to protect Sweden and Denmark from the threat of a recently mobilized Russian fleet. Stopping first at Copenhagen, he met with the court and completed arrangements for co-operation with the Danish navy. His report of 30 April 1726 evoked a glowing response from the secretary of state, Viscount Townshend: "his Majesty has commanded me to let you know from Him, that he was before persuaded you was a very good Admiral, but he now sees that you are likewise an able Minister. All the answers you gave to the questions proposed to you at the Conference with the Danish Council were extremely right." After calling on the Swedish court, Wager took his twenty ships of the line to Reval. He had orders to engage and destroy the Russian fleet if it came out. A frustrated and angry tsarina felt compelled to demobilize it instead. To reassure Sweden the British fleet stayed at Reval all summer, losing many men to sickness, and did not enter the Thames until 1 November 1726. He was at sea again soon afterwards when he arrived off Gibraltar 2 February 1727 with six ships of the line, two cruisers, two bomb-vessels, and additional troops for the garrison. The fleet helped cover the land approaches, Wager ordered two frigates and a bomb-vessel to "the back of the Hill", thus ensuring re-supply for the garrison. Although Britain and Spain were undoubtedly at war the actions were usually cautious and desultory except in early May when there was a furious artillery exchange. It was chiefly a naval war, with prizes taken. The main burden was borne by Francis Hosier's fleet in the Caribbean. The Spanish king agreed to a cessation of arms in mid-June, but gave no indication of actually yielding. Finally, in early March 1728, Spain agreed to a convention and Wager's fleet could be ordered home; he arrived on 9 April after sixteen months abroad.

Wager resumed his regular attendance at the Admiralty board, but again in May 1729 he was ordered to take command of thirty-three ships, which were soon joined by fourteen Dutch. This huge squadron never left Spithead and was popularly ridiculed as the "stay-at-home fleet". It was assembled because the court of Spain was acting as if the convention meant nothing; the fleet remained in readiness until it was learned that Spain would sign a firm treaty.

The provisions of this treaty confirmed the Spanish queen's title to certain parts of Italy, a right to install Spanish garrisons was also obtained. It seemed advisable to have a strong British fleet alongside the Spanish when the troops were to be landed at Leghorn. Thus Wager's flag was hoisted on the Namur (90 guns) and the British fleet entered Cádiz Bay on 1 August 1731, and, after much grand entertainment, moved into the Mediterranean. The mission at Leghorn was incident free but much delayed, so that Wager did not return to England until 10 December 1731. Upon arrival he reported his sense of "pleasure to have a success where doubtful".

Between April 1726 and December 1731 Wager had spent as many months flying his flag as he spent ashore. The missions he was asked to execute all involved diplomatic discretion as well as strategic acumen. This Leghorn mission was a good example of the duality of role that Wager was capable of. He was advanced to First Naval Lord on the Admiralty Board in May 1730.

In 1732, in a letter to a Gloucestershire acquaintance from the Admiralty office, he remarked that for many years he had been inclined to retire. "But", he continued, "I have been sent on several expeditions (not by my own choice), wherein I have succeeded so well, as to have the King's approbation, and very like may be put, in case of a Vacancy, at the head of this Board."

== First Lord of the Admiralty ==
When Lord Torrington died in January 1733, Under-Secretary Delafaye reported to a colleague: "Every body looks upon Sir Charles Wager as the person who will now be at the head of the affairs of the navy; as indeed I may say he has been for some time". It seems that Wager's administrative knowledge and talent did matter. The official appointment as first lord was dated 21 June 1733. The same year he became a member of His Majesty's Privy Council. He was subsequently nominated and elected MP for Westminster in 1734. Besides administrative capacity, Wager brought some important assets to the office. His character as a trusted senior admiral tended to subdue the incipient factions of the officer corps. An example of his candid professionalism was the strong plea he made to leading ministers in December 1738 that Edward Vernon should be given the West Indies command this in spite of Vernon's unrelenting opposition to him in parliament. He describe himself as a "Parliament man" to Sir Robert Walpole and in Wager Walpole proved to have a personal friend and a staunchly loyal spokesman in the House of Commons who was well liked, well informed, and widely trusted. It seems that when anyone in government needed an opinion on maritime geography, seaborne commerce or colonial circumstance Wager was asked. Many of his responses, most of them written in his own hand, have survived.

== The manning problem ==
One of the great unsolved problems of Wager's term in office was the manning of the fleet. In May 1731 Wager had remarked, "we have no difficulty but in getting men; ... our Country being such a free Country, that every man does what he pleases: by reason of which, this Nation will be lossd [sic] one time or other, if it won't admit of a remedy". Upon the outbreak of the so-called "War of Jenkins' Ear" in 1739 the problem rapidly grew severe, and Wager, strongly encouraged by Admiral Sir John Norris, pressed for legislative measures; the government introduced bills to facilitate naval manning and Walpole supported them, but Parliament would not pass anything meaningful. The strategy for defeating Spain, insisted the Duke of Newcastle, called for capturing a major objective in the West Indies. This meant that a large fleet and army had to be sent to a region where tropical diseases were rife. Wager was not confident, as he well knew the price of delay in that climate; his preferred strategy was to threaten the Peruvian coast from the "South Sea". Hence the famous voyage of Commodore George Anson, who sailed from England in 1740, was a result of Wager's advocacy. Even before the expedition to the West Indies left England the typhus epidemic of 1740, the worst of the century, ravaged newly recruited seamen and spread through the fleet, seriously aggravating the manning problem and delaying departure. Predictably the assault on Cartagena failed mainly because the forces succumbed to further tropical disease.

== Reputation ==
It has been claimed that the navy was ill prepared for war prior to 1739 and that the lack of preparation was mainly due to Wager's incompetence because of his age. Typical of these criticisms, the 1959 History of the British Navy states: "The leading figures in 1739, at the top because they were old, were Sir Richard ('sic') Wager and Sir John Norris .... [Wager] was seventy four – a great age for those heavy-drinking, smallpox ridden days – and he had not worn particularly well".

These claims, which seem to have emerged long after his death, seem doubtful. A captain who attended the great debate of 13 February 1741 on whether to petition the king to remove Walpole from office observed: 'Sir Charles Wager is as Hearty as I ever knew Him, spoke in the motion ... at four in the morning, tho He had been there from seven the morning before'. On that occasion Wager issued a challenge, saying that if there were any mismanagements 'in the Office of Admiralty, He and the rest of the Board ought to answer it at their own peril, and not Sir Robert' Wager was fit enough to command the king's channel crossings in 1740 and 1741, and his decision to turn back to Holland on a stormy night in December 1736 probably saved the whole entourage.

As so often happens in history an abundance of skill is turned, by fate, into the final instrument of downfall. The king insisted on having Wager see him across the channel in May 1741. This was unfortunate politically because the voyage coincided with the Westminster election. Wager was still popular and his presence during the polling might have prevented the surprise nomination of Edward Vernon who was in the West Indies and knew nothing about it. As it happened the bailiff pre-emptively closed the poll, thus provoking a riot and inviting a challenge. The fiasco, which culminated in a voiding of the election on a very close vote in the House of Commons, contributed notably to Walpole's loss of parliamentary control and the subsequent resignation by Wager as first lord in January 1742 when it became clear that Walpole was arranging to leave office.

== Personal life ==
On 8 December 1691 he married Martha Earning (1664/1666 – 1748), daughter of Anthony Earning, a Commonwealth navy captain who went into the East India Company's service after 1660 and died while captain of the George in the Indian Ocean. Wager left no children. While he was in Virginia, Wager acquired ownership of a young Black slave who was born c. 1686. Both of the slave's parents were owned by a Major Taylor, and he was born with vitiligo, which led William Byrd II to write the 1697 work An account of a Negro-Boy that is dappel'd in several places of his body with white spots recording his observations of the slave and his physical appearance.

== Final years ==
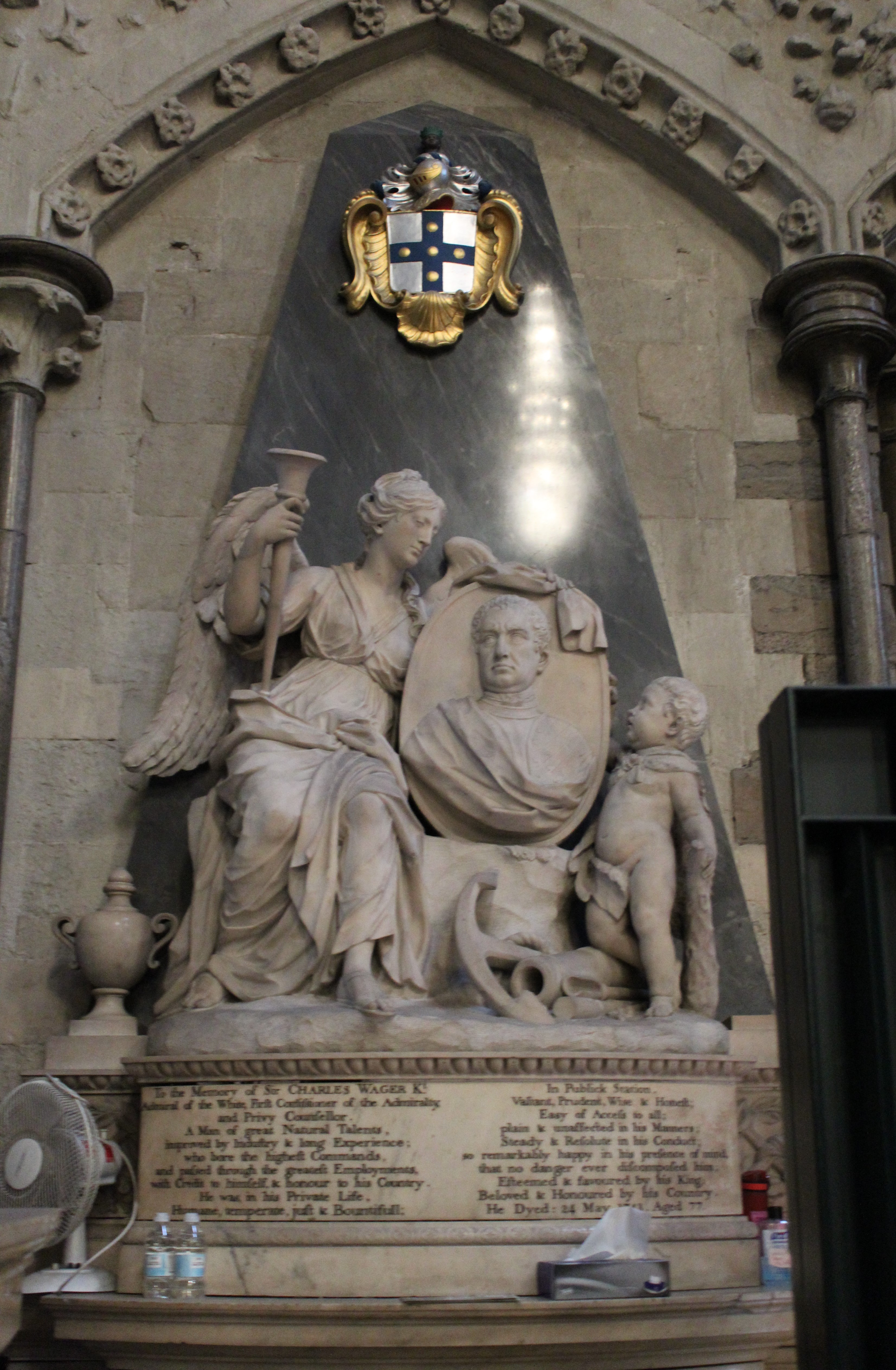
Monument to Wager in Westminster Abbey

In December 1742 Wager was appointed Treasurer of the Navy, a handsome sinecure which served as a pension. He remained in parliament, having been elected for West Looe. He was reportedly living at Stanley House, Chelsea, when he died, peacefully, on 24 May 1743 and was buried in the north transept of Westminster Abbey on 30 May 1743.

In 1747, Francis Gashry, long his right-hand man of business, erected a monument by the sculptor Peter Scheemakers in Westminster Abbey, and the bas-relief shows his famous naval engagement, with the inscription "The destroying & taking the SPANISH GALLEONS A.D. 1708". Lady Wager died on 7 April 1748 and was buried next to him.

His chief heir was Charles Bolton, son of his sister Prudence, to whom his estate at Kilmenath, near West Looe, Cornwall passed. His widow, Martha, was executor. They had no children, but numerous relatives, many stemming from his half-sisters, all of whom he is said to have helped financially or by appropriate patronage recommendations.

== Philanthropist ==
Wager was known for spreading his generosity very widely, to individuals in need as well as philanthropic organizations, for example he was patron of the Cockney's Feast held in the east end of London. An inscription on the ninth bell at the church of St Dunstan's, Stepney reads "To the honour of Sir. Chas. Wager Knt., First Lord of the Admiralty 1729, Patron of the Stepney or Cockney's Feast, instituted at Ratcliff in the year 1674, and discontinued 1784. John Matthews, Esq., Treasurer, T. Mears & Sons fecit. 1806".

== Obituaries ==
When Wager died Horace Walpole first observed that he had "left the fairest character", a judgement supported by all of the surviving evidence. A remembrance recorded many years later by Arthur Onslow, the respected speaker of the Commons, remains highly instructive:" He was of the most gentle and humane disposition I ever knew, and spent almost the whole he got in generous acts of charity and compassion. I had a long and intimate acquaintance with him, and have seen where his temper has been tried by much provocation, but I never saw him discomposed. He had a very good understanding, great plainness of manners, and a steadiness of courage that no danger could daunt, with the same calmness in it that he shewed in the most ordinary acts of his life. He was indeed a person of most extraordinary worth, and the world bore him a respect that was due to it. His father was a captain of a man of war before the restoration, and very likely after that: but dying when this son was young, and the mother marrying a Quaker, he was bred up among that people; by which he acquired the simplicity of his manners, and had much of their fashion in his speech as well as carriage. And all this, with his particular roughness of countenance, made the softness of his nature still more pleasing, because unexpected at first".

== In popular media ==
Actor Frank Finlay was cast as Wager in the Channel 4 TV series, Longitude in 2000.

== Recognition ==
The British warship HMS Wager was named for Charles Wager. Geographical features named for Charles Wager include Wager Island, which became the location of the Wager Mutiny.

== Sources ==
Printed

- A Society of Gentlemen (1780). The Biographical Dictionary, Or, Complete Historical Library: Containing the Lives of the Most Celebrated Personages of Great Britain and Ireland, Whether Admirals, Generals, Poets, Statesmen, Philosophers, Or Divines : a Work Replete with Instruction and Entertainment. F. Newbery.
- Austin, J. O., The Genealogical Dictionary of Rhode Island: comprising three generations of settlers who came before 1690 (1887)
- Baugh, D. A., "Sir Charles Wager", in Precursors of Nelson: British Admirals of the Eighteenth Century, ed. P. Le Fevre and R. Harding (2000), 101–26
- Bishop Burnet's History
- Capp, B. Cromwell's Navy: the fleet and the English revolution, 1648–1660 (1989)
- Chance, J. F., The Alliance of Hanover (1923)
- Chester, J. L., ed., The Marriage, Baptismal and Burial Registers of the Collegiate Church or Abbey of St Peter, Westminster, (Harleian Society, Register series; 10 (1876)
- Coxe, W. Memoirs of the Life and Administration of Sir Robert Walpole, Earl of Orford, 3 vols. (1798)
- Cruickshanks, E. 'Wager, Charles', History of Parliament, Commons, 1715–54
- Cundall, Frank (1915). Historic Jamaica. West India Committee.
- Davies, J. D., Gentlemen and Tarpaulins: the officers and men of the Restoration navy (1991)
- Gloucestershire Notes and Queries
- Kimball, G. S., ed., The Correspondence of the Colonial Governors of Rhode Island, 1723–1775, 2 vols. (1902–3)
- Lediard, T., The Naval History of England, 2 vols. (1735)
- M. Lewis, The History of the British Navy, (George Allen & Unwin, 1959)
- The Diary of Samuel Pepys,
- Quaker Anecdotes
- Rodger, N.A.M. (1979). The Admiralty. Offices of State. Lavenham: T. Dalton Ltd. ISBN 0900963948.
- [Vernon, E.], Some Letters to an Honest Sailor (1746)

Archives

- Library of Congress, manuscript division, Vernon–Wager MSS, Peter Force collection
- Manuscripts of the earl of Egmont: diary of Viscount Percival, afterwards first earl of Egmont, 3 vols., HMC, 63 (1920–23)
- Cambridge University Library, Cholmondeley (Houghton) MSS, 1784, 1786, 1807, 1881
- British Library, corresp. and papers, Add. MSS 19028–19031
- BL, official corresp., King's MSS 57–59
- L. Cong., corresp. and papers | BL, corresp. with duke of Newcastle, Add. MSS 32688–32992
- CUL, Cholmondeley (Houghton) MSS, letters to Walpole
- CUL, letters to Sir Robert Walpole
- L. Cong., Vernon–Wager MSS, Peter Force collection
- NMM, corresp. with Edward Vernon
- NRA, priv. coll., letters to first Earl Waldegrave
- TNA: PRO, SP 42/81–83

Military offices
Preceded by Sir John Jennings	Commander-in-Chief, Jamaica Station; 1707–1709	Succeeded by James Littleton
Preceded by Richard Haddock	Comptroller of the Navy; 1715–1718	Succeeded by James Mighells
Preceded by Sir John Norris	Senior Naval Lord; 1730–1733	Succeeded by Lord Archibald Hamilton
Parliament of Great Britain
Preceded by Sir Thomas Littleton; George Churchill	Member of Parliament for Portsmouth; 1710–1711; With: George Churchill 1710; Sir John Jennings 1710–1711	Succeeded by Sir James Wishart; Sir William Gifford
Preceded by John Trelawny; Sir Charles Hedges	Member of Parliament for West Looe; 1713–1715; With: John Trelawny	Succeeded by Thomas Maynard; George Delaval
Preceded by Sir James Wishart; Sir Thomas Mackworth	Member of Parliament for Portsmouth; 1715–1734; With: Sir Edward Ernle 1715–1722; Sir John Norris 1722–1734	Succeeded by Thomas Lewis; Philip Cavendish
Preceded by John Owen; Sir John Strange	Member of Parliament for Westminster with The Lord Sundon; 1734–1741	Succeeded by John Perceval; Charles Edwin
Preceded by John Trelawny; Sir Charles Hedges	Member of Parliament for West Looe; 1741–1743; With: Benjamin Keene	Succeeded by Benjamin Keene; John Frederick
Political offices
Preceded by The Viscount Torrington	First Lord of the Admiralty; 1733–1742	Succeeded by The Earl of Winchilsea and Nottingham
Preceded by Thomas Clutterbuck	Treasurer of the Navy; 1742–1743	Succeeded by Sir John Rushout, 4th Baronet
