= HMS Royal Oak (1674) =

74-gun third rate ship of the line of the Royal Navy

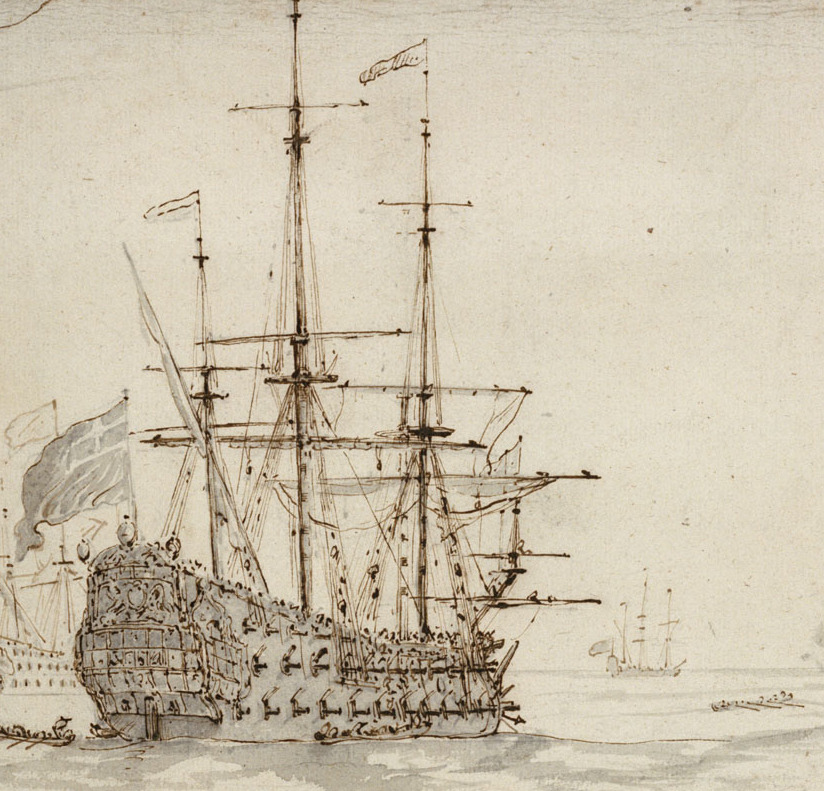
- 1674 illustration of Royal Oak

History

Great Britain
- Name: HMS Royal Oak
- Namesake: Royal Oak
- Builder: Shish, Deptford
- Launched: 1674
- Fate: Broken up, 1763
- Notes: Participated in: Battle of Vélez-Málaga; Battle of Cape Passaro

General characteristics as built
- Class & type: 74-gun third-rate ship of the line
- Tons burthen: 1107
- Length: 125 ft (38 m) (keel)
- Beam: 40 ft 6 in (12.34 m)
- Depth of hold: 18 ft 3 in (5.56 m)
- Propulsion: Sails
- Sail plan: Full-rigged ship
- Armament: 74 guns of various weights of shot

General characteristics after 1690 rebuild
- Class & type: 70-gun third rate ship of the line
- Tons burthen: 1154
- Length: 157 ft 6 in (48.01 m) (gundeck)
- Beam: 44 ft 4 in (13.51 m)
- Depth of hold: 18 ft 6 in (5.64 m)
- Propulsion: Sails
- Sail plan: Full-rigged ship
- Armament: 70 guns of various weights of shot

General characteristics after 1713 rebuild
- Class & type: 1706 Establishment 70-gun third-rate ship of the line
- Tons burthen: 1106
- Length: 150 ft (46 m) (gundeck)
- Beam: 41 ft (12 m)
- Depth of hold: 17 ft 4 in (5.28 m)
- Propulsion: Sails
- Sail plan: Full-rigged ship
- Armament: 70 guns: Gundeck: 26 × 24 pdrs; Upper gundeck: 26 × 12 pdrs; Quarterdeck: 14 × 6 pdrs; Forecastle: 4 × 6 pdrs

General characteristics after 1741 rebuild
- Class & type: 1733 proposals 70-gun third-rate ship of the line
- Tons burthen: 1224 tons
- Length: 151 ft (46 m) (gundeck)
- Beam: 43 ft 5 in (13.23 m)
- Depth of hold: 17 ft 9 in (5.41 m)
- Propulsion: Sails
- Sail plan: Full-rigged ship
- Armament: 70 guns: Gundeck: 26 × 24 pdrs; Upper gundeck: 26 × 12 pdrs; Quarterdeck: 14 × 6 pdrs; Forecastle: 4 × 6 pdrs

Plan of the 1741 rebuild of Royal Oak

HMS Royal Oak was a 74-gun third-rate ship of the line of the Royal Navy, built by Jonas Shish at Deptford and launched in 1674. She was one of only three Royal Navy ships to be equipped with the Rupertinoe naval gun. Life aboard her when cruising in the Mediterranean Sea in 1679 is described in the diary of Henry Teonge.

She was rebuilt at Chatham Dockyard in 1690 as a 70-gun third rate.

On 24 August 1704, Royal Oak participated in the Battle of Vélez-Málaga, in the centre division of the combined English-Dutch fleet under Admiral George Rooke.

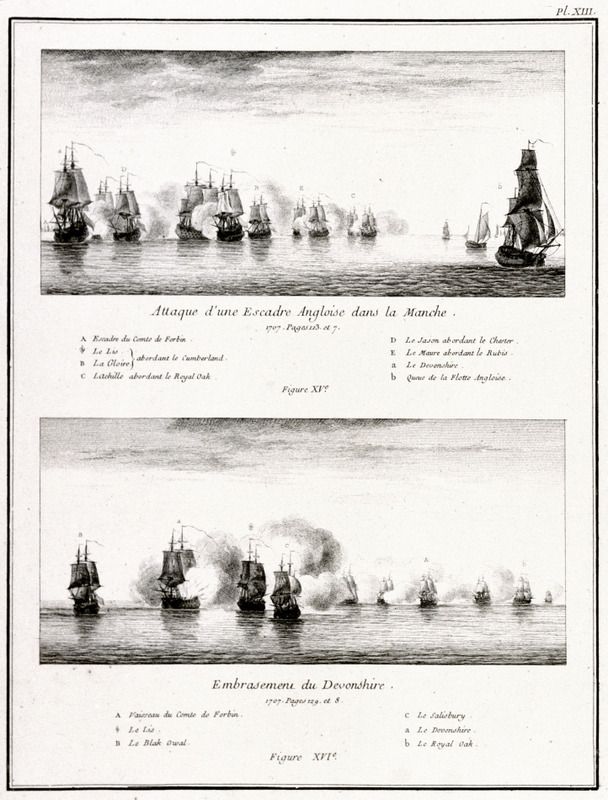
A print published in France shows the Royal Oak during the Action of 2 May 1707 off Beachy Head

She was rebuilt a second time at Woolwich Dockyard, relaunching on 14 May 1713 as a 70-gun third rate built to the 1706 Establishment. She fought off Forbin's squadron during the action of 2 May 1707, and was also present in the Battle at The Lizard.

Under the command of Captain Thomas Kempthorne, Royal Oak took part in the Battle of Cape Passaro on 11 August 1718 as part of Admiral Sir George Byng's fleet.

On 8 March 1737 she was ordered to be taken to pieces at Plymouth, and rebuilt by Peirson Lock as a 70-gun ship according to the 1733 proposals of the 1719 Establishment. She was relaunched on 29 August 1741. Captain Philip Vincent took command and the ship was assigned to the Mediterranean with Rear Admiral Richard Lestock's squadron. Vincent was succeeded by Captain Edmund Willams, Captain Charles Long and finally Captain James Hodsall.

Royal Oak was converted to serve as a prison ship at Plymouth in 1756. The ship was the scene of an incident in January 1759 in which a French prisoner, Jean Manaux, told the warden that his fellow prisoners were forging passes. His fellow prisoners discovered this and, on 25 January, dragged him to a remote part of the ship, gave him approximately 60 strokes with a large iron thimble tied to a rope, then beat him to death after he struggled from his bonds. They dismembered his body in an attempt to dispose of it. At an inquest ashore the next day, one of the prisoners provided information on the murder, which resulted in the hanging of Charles Darras, Louis Bourdec, Fleurant Termineu, Pierre Pitroll and Pierre Lagnal on April 25 at Exeter.

Royal Oak was broken up in 1763.
