= HMS Grafton (1679) =

Ship of the line of the Royal Navy

History

England
- Name: HMS Grafton
- Ordered: April 1677
- Builder: Woolwich Dockyard
- Launched: 17 May 1679
- Commissioned: 16 July 1679
- Honours and awards: Barfleur 1692; Vigo 1704; Gibraltar 1704; Velez-Malaga 1704
- Captured: 2 May 1707 by French
- Fate: Le Grafton in French Navy, broken 1744

General characteristics as built
- Class & type: 70-gun third rate ship of the line
- Tons burthen: 1,05274/94 tons (bm)
- Length: 150 ft 0 in (45.72 m) gundeck; 120 ft 8 in (36.78 m) keel for tonnage
- Beam: 40 ft 5 in (12.32 m)
- Draught: 18 ft 0 in (5.49 m)
- Depth of hold: 17 ft 2 in (5.23 m)
- Propulsion: Sails
- Sail plan: Full-rigged ship
- Armament: 1677 Establishment 72/60 guns; 26 × demi-cannons 54 cwt – 9.5 ft (LD); 26 × 12-pdr guns 32 cwt – 9 ft (UD); 10 × sakers 16 cwt – 7 ft (QD); 4 × sakers 16 cwt – 7 ft (Fc); 5 × 5 3-pdr guns 5 cwt – 5 ft (RH)

General characteristics after 1700 rebuild
- Class & type: 70-gun third rate ship of the line
- Tons burthen: 1,10342/94 tons (bm)
- Length: 150 ft 8.5 in (45.94 m) gundeck; 124 ft 5 in (37.92 m) Keel for tonnage
- Beam: 40 ft 10 in (12.45 m)
- Depth of hold: 16 ft 8 in (5.08 m)
- Propulsion: Sails
- Sail plan: Full-rigged ship
- Armament: 1685 Establishment 72/60 guns; 26 × demi-cannons (54 cwt – 9.5 ft (LD); 26 × demi-culverins (UD); 10 × sakers 16 cwt – 7 ft (QD); 4 × sakers 16 cwt – 7 ft (Fc); 5 × 5 3-pdr guns 5 cwt – 5 ft (RH)

HMS Grafton was a 70-gun third rate built at Woolwich Dockyard in 1677/79. She was sailed to Chatham, where she was placed in Ordinary in 1679. She was commissioned in 1683 to participate in the evacuation of Tangier, Morocco. She served during the War of the English Succession fighting in the Battles of Beachy Head and Barfleur. She was rebuilt under contract at Rotherhithe in 1699/1701, and was then in active commission during the War of Spanish Succession. She fought in the Battle of Vigo, the capture of Gibraltar and the Battle of Velez Malaga. She was taken by the French in 1707 and incorporated into the French Navy, being finally broken at Brest in 1744.

She was named in honour of Charles II's illegitimate son, Henry Fitzroy, one of his sons by Barbara Palmer (Duchess of Cleveland). Henry Fitzroy had been created the Duke of Grafton in 1675. She was the first vessel to bear the name Grafton in the English and Royal Navy.

HMS Grafton was awarded the Battle Honours Barfleur 1692 Vigo 1702, Gibraltar 1704, and Velez-Malaga 1704.

== Construction and specifications ==
She was ordered in April 1677 to be built at Woolwich Dockyard under the guidance of Master Shipwright Phineas Pett (until February 1678) then completed by Thomas Shish. She was launched on 17 May 1679. Her dimensions were a gundeck of 150 feet 0 inches (45.72 metres) with a keel of 120 feet 8 inches (36.78 metres) for tonnage calculation with a breadth of 40 feet 6 inches (12.34 metres) and a depth of hold of 17 feet 2 inches (5.23 metres). Her builder's measure tonnage was calculated as 1,05274/94 tons (burthen). Her draught was 18 feet 0 inches (5.49 metres).

Her initial gun armament was in accordance with the 1677 Establishment with 72/60 guns consisting of twenty-six demi-cannons (54 cwt, 9.5 ft) on the lower deck, twenty-six 12-pounder guns (32 cwt, 9 ft) on the upper deck, ten sakers (16 cwt, 7 ft) on the quarterdeck and four sakers (16 cwt, 7 ft) on the foc's'le with four 3-pounder guns (5 cwt, 5 ft) on the poop deck or roundhouse. By 1688 she would carry 70 guns as per the 1685 Establishment . Her initial manning establishment would be for a crew of 460/380/300 personnel.

== Commissioned service ==
=== Service 1679-1699 ===
She was commissioned on 16 July 1679 under the command of Captain John Perryman for delivery to Chatham. On 18 April 1683 she was under the command of Captain Sir William Booth and nominally under Captain Henry Fitzroy, the Duke of Grafton. Captain Booth held command until 19 April 1684. On 4 August she became the Flagship of Admiral George Legge, the Earl of Dartmouth and then sailed from Plymouth for the evacuation of Tangier, Morocco.

In 1690 she was under the command of Captain Henry Fitzroy, the Duke of Grafton. She partook in the Battle of Beachy Head in Centre (Red) Squadron on 30 June 1690. She participated in the attack on Cork, Ireland on 29 September 1690 during which Captain Fitzroy was mortally wounded, dying 9 October 1690. In 1691 she was under command of Captain Benjamin Hoskins followed later by Captain Henry Bokenham. She fought in the Battle of Barfleur in Red Squadron, Centre Division from 19 to 22 May 1692. In 1693 she was under Captain Thomas Warren. In 1694 she was under Captain Richard Fitzpatrick sailing with Russel's Fleet in the English Channel then on to the Mediterranean in October 1694. She returned home to pay off in October 1695. She was to be rebuilt in Rotherhithe and was delayed for a year.

=== Rebuild Rotherhithe 1699/1700 ===
She was ordered in 1699 to be rebuilt under contract by John & Richard Wells of Rotherhithe. She was launched/completed in 1700. Her dimensions were a gundeck of 150 feet 8.5 inches (45.94 metres) with a keel of 124 feet 5 inches (37.92 metres) for tonnage calculation with a breadth of 40 feet 10 inches (12.45 metres) and a depth of hold of 16 feet 8 inches (5.08 metres). Her builder's measure tonnage was calculated as 1,10342/94 tons (burthen). She probably retained her armament as stated in the 1685 Establishment, though it is unclear if her armament was changed to the 1703 Establishment later. It is known that when completed her gun armament total at least 70 guns.

=== Service 1701-1707 ===
She was commissioned in 1701 under Captain Thomas Harlow for service in the Downs Squadron. With the outbreak of the War of Spanish Succession in May 1702, she sailed with Admiral Sir George Rooke's Fleet on 19 July for operations at Cadiz, Spain. On the 19th of September, after accomplishing little the Fleet sailed for Home. At Lagos, Portugal they learned that the Spanish Treasure Fleet and its French escort was at Vigo Bay . The Fleet sailed north. On 12 October, twenty-seven ships of the Anglo-Dutch Fleet attacked the ships in Vigo Bay and Rendondela Harbour, Spain (Battle of Vigo). All the French and Spanish vessels were either captured or destroyed.

In 1703 she was under the command of Captain Sir Andrew Leake still with Sir George Rooke's Fleet in the Mediterranean. She partook in the capture of Gibraltar on 23 July 1704. She was part of the force that was to attack the New Mole. Gibraltar surrendered on the 24th. On August 13, 1704, she fought in the Battle of Velez Malaga as a member of the Center Squadron, suffering 31 killed Including Captain Leake and 66 wounded. Captain J. Hearne took command after Leake's death. Captain Hearne died in September 1705, Then she was under command of Captain Edward Acton still serving in the Mediterranean.

== Loss ==
On 2 May 1707 she was taken by Forbin's Squadron off Brighton. Captain Acton was killed in the engagement. She was incorporated into the French Navy as Le Grafton. She served in the French Navy until 1744 when she was condemned and broken at Brest.

== See also ==
- List of ships captured in the 18th century
