= HMS Lancaster (1694) =

Ship of the line of the Royal Navy

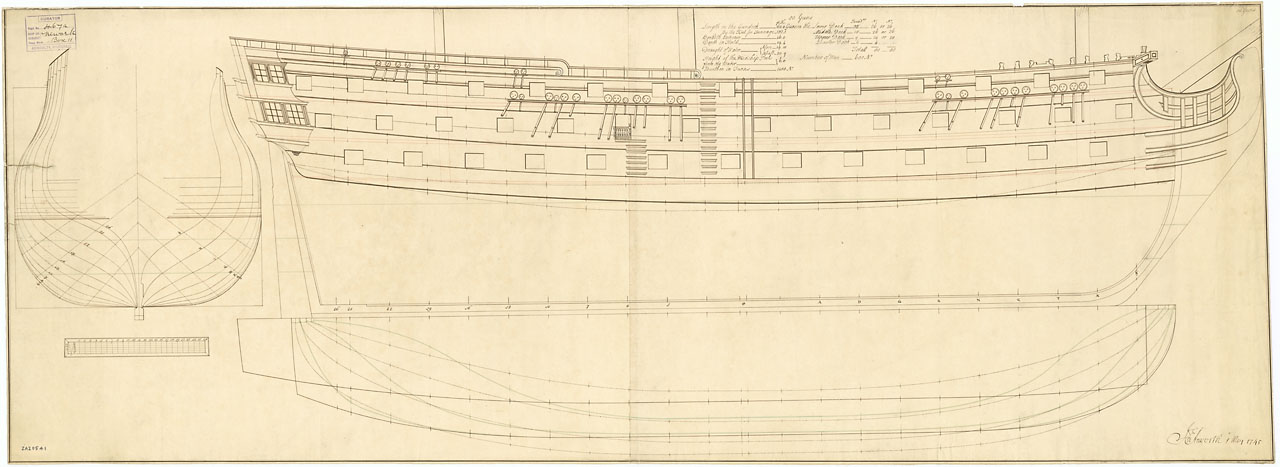
- Plan of the 1749 version of Lancaster

History

Great Britain
- Name: HMS Lancaster
- Builder: Wyatt, Bursledon
- Launched: 3 April 1694
- Fate: Broken up, 1773

General characteristics as built
- Class & type: 80-gun third rate ship of the line
- Tons burthen: 1198 bm
- Length: 156 ft 1 in (47.6 m) (gundeck)
- Beam: 41 ft 10 in (12.8 m)
- Depth of hold: 18 ft 6 in (5.6 m)
- Propulsion: Sails
- Sail plan: Full-rigged ship
- Armament: 80 guns of various weights of shot

General characteristics after 1722 rebuild
- Class & type: 1719 Establishment 80-gun third rate ship of the line
- Tons burthen: 1366 bm
- Length: 158 ft (48.2 m) (gundeck)
- Beam: 44 ft 6 in (13.6 m)
- Depth of hold: 18 ft 2 in (5.5 m)
- Propulsion: Sails
- Sail plan: Full-rigged ship
- Armament: 80 guns: Gundeck: 26 × 32 pdrs; Middle gundeck: 26 × 12 pdrs; Upper gundeck: 24 × 6 pdrs; Quarterdeck: 4 × 6 pdrs

General characteristics after 1749 rebuild
- Class & type: 1741 proposals 66-gun third rate ship of the line
- Tons burthen: 1478 bm
- Length: 161 ft (49.1 m) (gundeck)
- Beam: 46 ft (14.0 m)
- Depth of hold: 19 ft 4 in (5.9 m)
- Propulsion: Sails
- Sail plan: Full-rigged ship
- Armament: 66 guns: Gundeck: 26 × 32 pdrs; Upper gundeck: 26 × 18 pdrs; Quarterdeck: 10 × 9 pdrs; Forecastle: 4 × 9 pdrs

HMS Lancaster was an 80-gun third rate ship of the line of the Royal Navy, launched at Bursledon on 3 April 1694.

== Early career ==
Lancaster was built at a cost of £12,807.4.10d, and had an armament of twenty-four demi-cannon, thirty culverins, and twenty-six sakers: eighty guns in all. She was launched at Bursledon on 3 April 1694 under Captain Andrew Leake, and was commanded by Captain Robert Robinson in 1696 and Henry Martin in 1697. In 1702, under Captain John Price, she was with Cloudesley Shovell and the Mediterranean Fleet, and continued so, commanded by Captain Christopher Myngs in 1703, and under Captain James Moodie from 1707 to 1708. She spent 1708 with Admiral John Leake's fleet in the Straits of Gibraltar, and was probably under Captain John Huntingdon from 1709 to 1711 in the English Channel.

== Later career ==
She was rebuilt according to the 1719 Establishment at Portsmouth, from where she was relaunched on 1 September 1722. After this time, her armament of 80 guns, previously carried on two gundecks, was carried on three, though she continued to be classified as a third rate. On 15 February 1743 she was ordered to be taken to pieces and rebuilt at Woolwich Dockyard as a 66-gun third rate according to the 1741 proposals of the 1719 Establishment. This rebuild returned her to a two-decker, and she was relaunched on 22 April 1749.

== Fate ==
Lancaster was broken up in 1773.
