= HMS Ranelagh =

Ship of the line of the Royal Navy

History

Great Britain
- Name: HMS Ranelagh
- Ordered: 30 May 1695
- Builder: Fisher Harding, Deptford Dockyard
- Launched: 25 June 1697
- Renamed: HMS Princess Caroline, 1728
- Fate: Broken up, 1764
- Notes: Participated in: Battle of Vigo; Battle of Vélez-Málaga

General characteristics as built
- Class & type: 80-gun third rate ship of the line
- Tons burthen: 1199 bm
- Length: 158 ft 8 in (48.4 m) (gundeck)
- Beam: 41 ft 8.75 in (12.7 m)
- Depth of hold: 17 ft 4 in (5.3 m)
- Propulsion: Sails
- Sail plan: Full-rigged ship
- Complement: 476
- Armament: 80 guns of various weights of shot

General characteristics after 1731 rebuild
- Class & type: 1719 Establishment 80-gun third rate ship of the line
- Tons burthen: 1353 bm
- Length: 158 ft (48.2 m) (gundeck)
- Beam: 44 ft 6 in (13.6 m)
- Depth of hold: 18 ft 2 in (5.5 m)
- Propulsion: Sails
- Sail plan: Full-rigged ship
- Armament: 80 guns: Gundeck: 26 × 32 pdrs; Middle gundeck: 26 × 12 pdrs; Upper gundeck: 24 × 6 pdrs; Quarterdeck: 4 × 6 pdrs

HMS Ranelagh was a three-decker 80-gun third-rate ship of the line of the Royal Navy, launched at Deptford Dockyard on 25 June 1697. She took part in a number of actions during the War of the Spanish Succession, including the Battle of Vigo in 1702 and the Battle of Vélez-Málaga in 1704.

On 20 August 1723 she was ordered to be taken to pieces and rebuilt according to the 1719 Establishment at Woolwich. She was renamed HMS Princess Caroline in 1728 (while rebuilding). She was relaunched on 15 March 1731.

Princess Caroline was Admiral Edward Vernon's flagship at the Battle of Cartagena de Indias during his second Spanish Caribbean campaign, in the War of Jenkins' Ear. George Washington's half-brother, Lawrence Washington, served on Princess Caroline as a captain of the Marines in 1741, and named his estate Mount Vernon in honour of his commander.

The Princess Caroline continued in service until 1764, when she was broken up.
