= HMS Tilbury (1745) =

Ship of the line of the Royal Navy

History

Great Britain
- Name: HMS Tilbury
- Ordered: 17 December 1742
- Builder: Portsmouth Dockyard
- Launched: 20 July 1745
- Honours and awards: Second Battle of Cape Finisterre, 1747
- Fate: Foundered, 1757

General characteristics
- Class & type: 1741 proposals 58-gun fourth rate ship of the line
- Tons burthen: 1,123 57/94 bm
- Length: 147 ft (44.8 m) (gundeck)
- Beam: 42 ft (12.8 m)
- Depth of hold: 18 ft 1 in (5.5 m)
- Propulsion: Sails
- Sail plan: Full-rigged ship
- Armament: 58 guns: Gundeck: 24 × 24 pdrs; Upper gundeck: 24 × 12 pdrs; Quarterdeck: 8 × 6 pdrs; Forecastle: 2 × 6 pdrs

HMS Tilbury was a 58-gun fourth rate ship of the line of the Royal Navy, ordered from Portsmouth Dockyard on 17 December 1742 and built by Peirson Lock to the dimensions laid down in the 1741 proposals of the 1719 Establishment. She was launched on 20 July 1745.

In 1757 Tilbury was under the command of Captain Henry Barnsley, and formed part of Vice Admiral Francis Holburne's expedition to capture Louisbourg. The squadron was dispersed by a storm on 24 September, and Tilbury was driven onto the rocks. Captain Barnsley and 120 of his crew were drowned, and the survivors became French prisoners, though they were treated well by their captors.
