= Action of 2 May 1707 =

1707 naval battle

Coordinates: 50°44′20.29″N 0°14′31.58″E

- Part of the War of the Spanish Succession
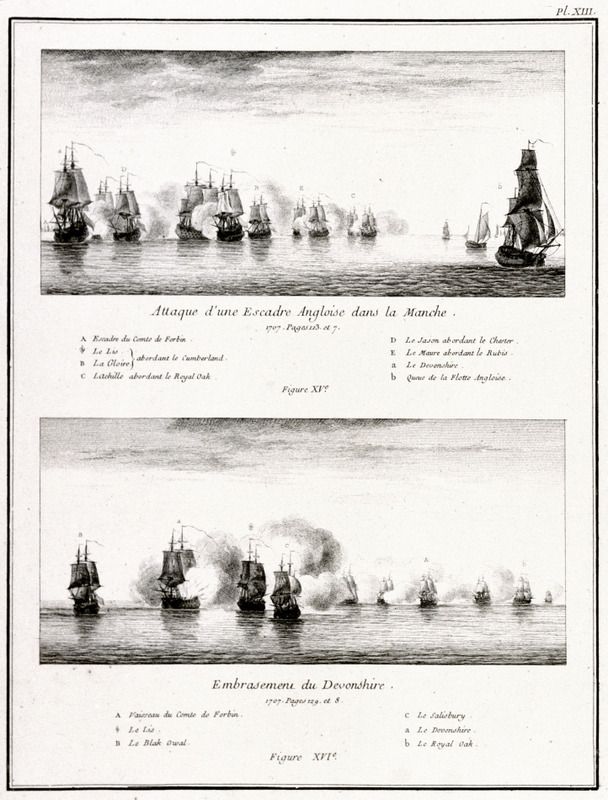
- Action of 2 May 1707. National Maritime Museum
Date	2–3 May 1707
Location	off Beachy Head
Result	French victory

Belligerents
France	Great Britain

Commanders and leaders
(Kingdom of France) Claude de Forbin	(Kingdom of Great Britain) Baron Wylde

Strength
7 Ships of the line 6 Privateers	3 Ships of the line 52 Merchantmen

Casualties and losses
220 killed or wounded	2 Ships of the line captured 21 merchantmen captured 1,200 prisoners

The action of 2 May 1707, also known as Beachy Head, was a naval battle of the War of the Spanish Succession in which a French squadron under Claude de Forbin intercepted a large British convoy escorted by three ships of the line, under Commodore Baron Wylde. The action began when three French ships, the Grifon, Blackoal and Dauphine, grappled HMS Hampton Court, killing her captain, George Clements, and taking her. Claude Forbin's 60-gun Mars next attacked HMS Grafton and, when joined by the French ships Blackoal and Fidèle, killed the Captain Edward Acton, and took her too. The convoy was scattered and the last British escort, HMS Royal Oak, badly hit and with 12 feet of water in her wells, managed to escape by running ashore near Dungeness, from where she was carried the next day into the Downs.

The French took 21 merchant ships, besides the two 70-gun ships of the line, and carried them all into Dunkirk.

== Action ==
On 1 May a large outward-bound convoy for the West Indies, under the protection of three ships of the line, sailed from the Downs and being six leagues to the westward of Beachy, they fell in with the French squadron from Dunkirk, commanded by Claude de Forbin. This squadron consisted of 7 sail of the line and 6 privateers. The action began when 3 French ships, Griffon, Blackoal and La Dauphine, grappled HMS Hampton Court and killed Captain Clements. Commodore Wyld took five of his largest merchant ships into his line and boldly met the attack of the French ships. For two and a half hours a heavy fire was kept up on both sides; HMS Hampton Court fought desperately and was obliged to surrender. La Dauphine next vigorously attacked HMS Grafton and when joined by the French ships Blackoal and Fidele, captured her after a warm dispute of half an hour. Claude Forbin's 60-gun Mars attacked Commodore Wyld's Royal Oak. The ship having eleven feet of water in her hold, managed to escape with great loss by running ashore, from where she was carried into the Downs.

== Order of battle ==
=== France ===
- Mars 60 – Chevalier de Forbin, Chef de division.
- La Dauphine 56 – Comte de Roquefeuil.
- Fidèle 56 – Baron d'Arey.
- Blackoal 54 – de Tourouvre.
- Salisbury 50 – Chevalier de Vezins.
- Griffon 50 – Chevalier de Nangis.
- Protée 50 – Comte d'Illiers.

6 Privateers.

=== Britain ===
- HMS Royal Oak 76 – Commodore Baron Wylde, Escaped.
- HMS Hampton Court 70 – Captain George Clements †, Captured.
- HMS Grafton 70 – Captain Edward Acton †, Captured.

55 Merchant ships.
