= HMS Kingston (1697) =

Ship of the line of the Royal Navy

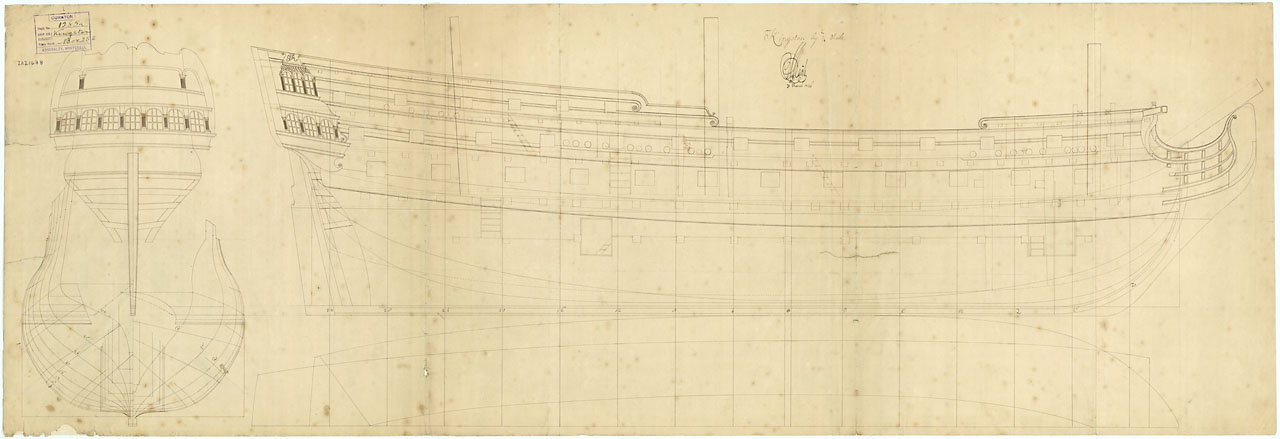
- Plan of the 1719 rebuild

History

Great Britain
- Name: HMS Kingston
- Builder: Frame, Hull
- Laid down: 1665
- Launched: 13 March 1697
- Out of service: Sold, 14 January 1762
- Notes: Participated in: Battle of Vélez Málaga; Battle of Toulon; Battle of Minorca (1756); Battle of Quiberon Bay

Great Britain
- Name: Lord Clive
- Acquired: 1762 by purchase
- Fate: Sunk in battle on 6 January 1763 whilst serving as the privateer Lord Clive

General characteristics as built
- Class & type: 60-gun fourth-rate ship of the line
- Tons burthen: 923 (bm)
- Length: 145 ft (44.2 m) (gundeck)
- Beam: 37 ft 11 in (11.6 m)
- Depth of hold: 15 ft 9 in (4.8 m)
- Propulsion: Sails
- Sail plan: Full-rigged ship
- Armament: 60 guns of various weights of shot

General characteristics after 1719 rebuild
- Class & type: 1706 Establishment 60-gun fourth rate ship of the line
- Tons burthen: 918 (bm)
- Length: 144 ft (43.9 m) (gundeck)
- Beam: 38 ft (11.6 m)
- Depth of hold: 15 ft 8 in (4.8 m)
- Propulsion: Sails
- Sail plan: Full-rigged ship
- Armament: 60 guns: Gundeck: 24 × 24-pounder guns; Upper gundeck: 26 × 9-pounder guns; QD: 8 × 6-pounder guns; Fc: 2 × 6-pounder guns

General characteristics after 1740 rebuild
- Class & type: 1733 proposals 60-gun fourth rate ship of the line
- Tons burthen: 1,068 (bm)
- Length: 144 ft (43.9 m) (gundeck)
- Beam: 41 ft 5 in (12.6 m)
- Depth of hold: 16 ft 11 in (5.2 m)
- Propulsion: Sails
- Sail plan: Full-rigged ship
- Armament: 60 guns: Gundeck: 24 × 24-pounder guns; Upper gundeck: 26 × 9-pounder guns; QD: 8 × 6-pounder guns; Fc: 2 × 6-pounder guns

HMS Kingston was a 60-gun fourth-rate ship of the line of the Royal Navy, built by Frame in Hull and launched on 13 March 1697. She had an eventful career, taking part in numerous engagements.

== Career ==
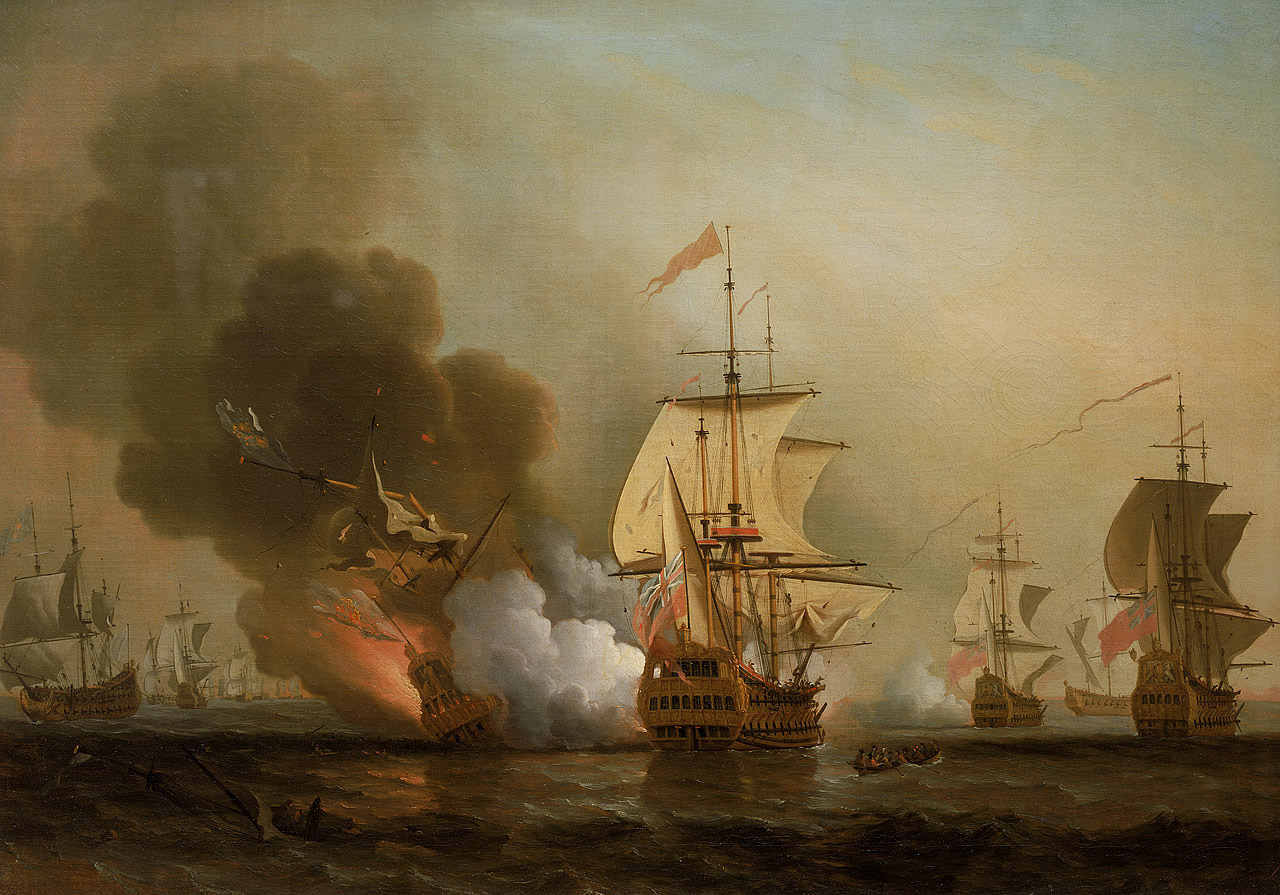
Wager's Action off Cartagena, 28 May 1708

During the War of Spanish Succession, Kingston took part in the engagements of Gibraltar (1704) under the command of Edward Acton, Vélez Málaga (1709) and Gaspé (1711).

She was present at Wager's Action a naval confrontation on 8 June 1708 N.S (28 May O.S.), between a British squadron under Charles Wager and the Spanish treasure fleet, as part of the War of Spanish Succession.

She was rebuilt for the first time according to the 1706 Establishment at Portsmouth Dockyard, and relaunched on 9 May 1719. She was rebuilt for a second time at Plymouth according to the 1733 proposals of the 1719 Establishment, and relaunched on 8 October 1740. Kingston was present at the Battle of Toulon in 1744.

During the Seven Years' War, the ship was part of Admiral John Byng's squadron sent to relieve Fort St. Philip (Port Mahon) in 1756, besieged by a French amphibious force who had invaded the island of Menorca (historically called "Minorca" by the British). The squadron set sail from England on 10 April. On 2 May, it arrived at Gibraltar, departing on 8 May. On 19 May, it came into sight of Fort St. Philip. The French fleet then advanced to meet Byng. On 20 May, the squadron fought the Battle of Menorca where several British ships were seriously damaged but none was lost on either side. On 24 May, after a council of war, Byng gave orders to return to Gibraltar, abandoning Menorca to its fate. The squadron arrived at Gibraltar on 19 June.

In 1757, the ship was part of Admiral Holbourne's squadron which left Ireland on 5 May for the planned expedition against Louisbourg. By 10 July, the entire squadron was finally at anchor before Halifax where it made its junction with Hardy's squadron. However, in August, when the combined fleet was ready to set sail, Louisbourg had already been reinforced by three French squadrons and Governor Loudon cancelled the whole enterprise. Holbourne's squadron stayed off Louisbourg until 25 September when it was dispersed by a storm, forcing it to return to Great Britain in a very bad condition. On 20 November 1759, Kingston took part in the Battle of Quiberon Bay where the French navy suffered a great defeat.

== As Lord Clive ==
The ship was sold to privateers linked to the East India Company on 14 January 1762 and renamed Lord Clive.

The same year, during the Spanish-Portuguese War, 1761-1763, these privateers, fighting on the side of Portugal, had plans to conquer Spanish territory in South America and organised a raid on Buenos Aires and Montevideo.
Their squadron, under the command of John McNamara from the East India Company, consisted of Lord Clive (60), Ambuscade (40), two Portuguese ships (among which were the frigate Gloria (38)) transporting 500 infantry, and five storeships. On 2 November, the squadron sailed from Rio de Janeiro towards the mouth of the Río de la Plata but soon abandoned the project because Spanish defenders in both cities were fully alerted and well prepared.

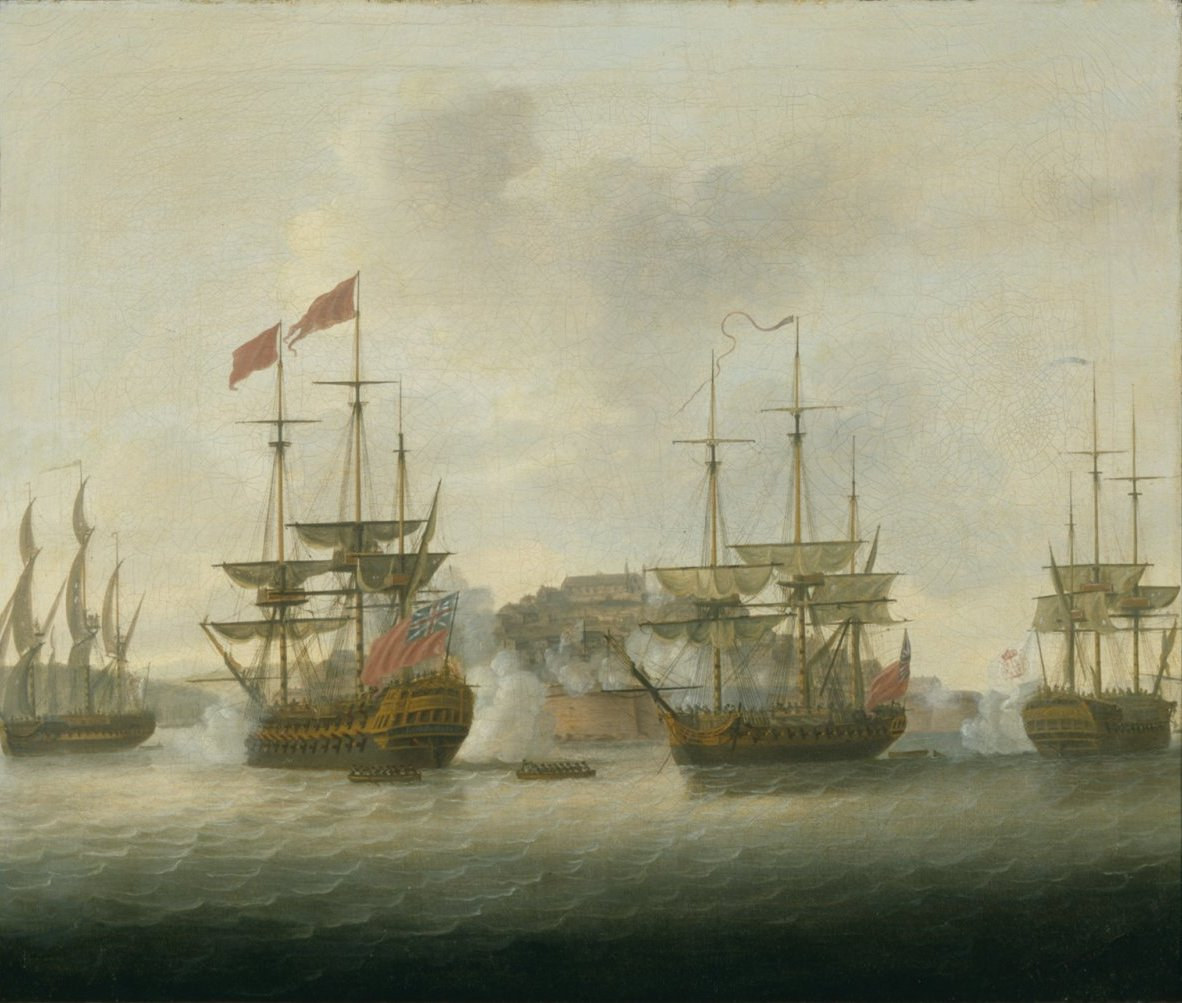
Lord Clive and Ambuscade at the attack on Nova Colonia in the River Plate in 1763, under the command of Captain John Macnamara

On 6 January 1763, McNamara decided to attack and retake Colonia do Sacramento also in Spanish hands. 60-gun Lord Clive and the 40-gun HMS Ambuscade, along with 38-gun Portuguese Gloria, anchored near the city and started bombardment, but they received unexpected strong resistance from the city's gun battery. After three hours of an exchange of fire, a fire developed on Lord Clive that quickly progressed until it reached her magazine, which exploded, sinking her. There were 272 fatalities on board, including McNamara. Ambuscade and Gloria were badly damaged too, and retired from combat.
