= HMS Swallow (1732) =

Ship of the line of the Royal Navy

History

Great Britain
- Name: HMS Swallow
- Ordered: 7 January 1729
- Builder: Devonport Dockyard
- Launched: 6 October 1732
- Fate: Broken up, 1742

General characteristics
- Class & type: 1719 Establishment 60-gun fourth rate ship of the line
- Tons burthen: 951 bm
- Length: 144 ft (43.9 m) (gundeck)
- Beam: 39 ft (11.9 m)
- Depth of hold: 16 ft 5 in (5.0 m)
- Propulsion: Sails
- Sail plan: Full-rigged ship
- Armament: 60 guns: Gundeck: 24 × 24-pdrs; Upper gundeck: 26 × 9-pdrs; Quarterdeck: 8 × 6-pdrs; Forecastle: 2 × 6-pdrs

HMS Swallow was a 60-gun fourth rate ship of the line of the Royal Navy, built by Peirson Lock to the dimensions of the 1719 Establishment at the Yard at Plymouth Dock (now called Devonport), and launched on 6 October 1732. She was renamed HMS Princess Louisa in 1737.

== Engagements ==
HMS Princess Louisa took part in the destruction of the fortress of San Lorenzo el Real Chagres (22-24 March 1740), in Panama, as part of a squadron commanded by Vice-Admiral Edward Vernon during the War of Jenkins' Ear.

At 3 pm on 22 March 1740, the English squadron, composed of the ships Strafford, Norwich, Falmouth and Princess Louisa, the frigate Diamond, the bomb vessels Alderney, Terrible and Cumberland, the fireships Success and Eleanor, and transports Goodly and Pompey, under Vernon's command, began to bombard the Spanish fortress. Given the overwhelming superiority of the English forces, Captain Don Juan Carlos Gutiérrez Cevallos surrendered the fort on 24 March, after resisting for two days.

Princess Louisa served until 1742, when she was broken up.
