= HMS Mediator (1745) =

Sloop of the Royal Navy

History

Great Britain
- Name: HMS Mediator
- Laid down: 1741
- Launched: 1741
- Acquired: 1745 at Antigua
- Commissioned: 18 March 1745
- In service: 1745
- Stricken: 3 June 1745
- Reinstated: 4 June 1745
- Fate: Foundered at Ostend, 29 July 1745

General characteristics
- Class & type: sloop of war
- Tons burthen: 104 74/94 bm
- Length: 61 ft 4 in (18.7 m) (gundeck); 44 ft 0 in (13.4 m) (keel)
- Beam: 21 ft 2 in (6.5 m)
- Depth of hold: 9 ft 9 in (3.0 m)
- Sail plan: single-masted, sloop-rigged
- Complement: 80
- Armament: 10 × 4-pdrs; 18 × 1/2-pounder swivel guns

HMS Mediator was a 10-gun single-masted sloop of war of the Royal Navy, in service in American in 1745, during the War of the Austrian Succession. Built in Chesapeake Bay in 1741, she was purchased by the Navy four years later and sailed to Portsmouth for fitting out by Peirson Lock.

She was captured by a French privateer in June 1745, but recaptured the following day.

Mediator sprang a leak and foundered in Ostend harbor on 29 July 1745.

== Construction ==
Mediator was built as a private merchant vessel in early 1741, on the shore of Chesapeake Bay in the British colony of Virginia. She was a single-masted sloop with sloop-rigged sails, a 44 ft 0 in (13.4 m) keel and a substantial 21 ft 2 in (6.5 m) beam.

== Bibliography ==
- Chapelle, Howard Irving (1967). The search for speed under sail, 1700–1855. New York: Bonanza Books / Norton. pp. 70 ff.
- Winfield, Rif (2007). British Warships of the Age of Sail 1714–1792: Design, Construction, Careers and Fates. Seaforth. ISBN 9781844157006.
