= HMS Hampton Court (1678) =

Ship of the line of the Royal Navy

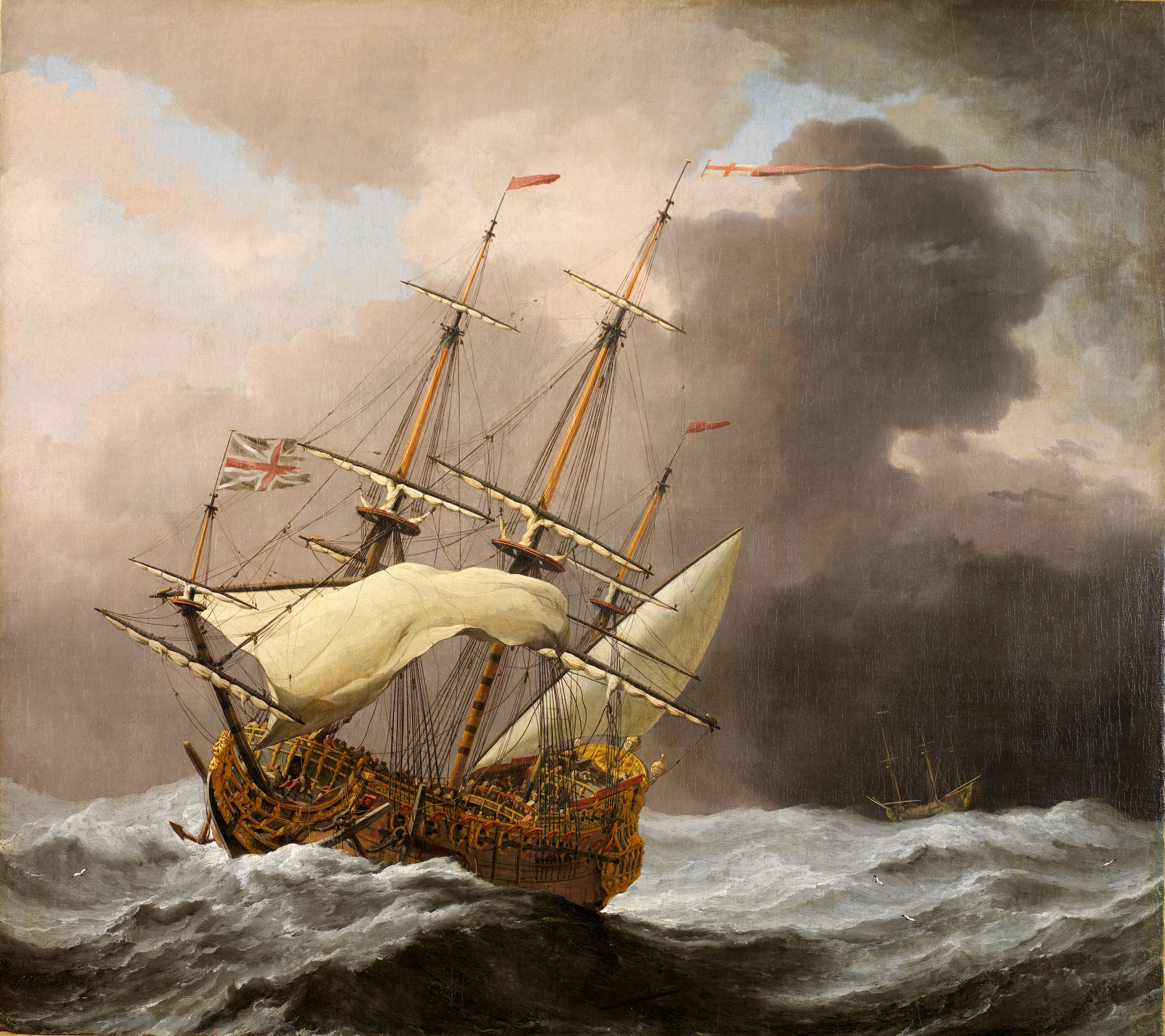
- The English Ship Hampton Court in a Gale, Willem van de Velde the Younger 1680s

History

England
- Name: HMS Hampton Court
- Ordered: April 1677
- Builder: John Shish, Deptford Dockyard
- Laid down: 1677
- Launched: 10 July 1678
- Commissioned: 9 May 1678
- Honours and awards: Barfleur 1692; Marbella 1705
- Captured: 2 May 1707
- Fate: In French Navy 1707-1711, sold to Spanish 1712, wrecked in 1715

General characteristics as built
- Class & type: 70-gun third rate ship of the line
- Tons burthen: 1,03621/94 tons (bm)
- Length: 150 ft 6 in (45.87 m) gundeck; 121 ft 3 in (36.96 m) keel for tonnage
- Beam: 40 ft 1 in (12.22 m)
- Draught: 18 ft 6 in (5.64 m)
- Depth of hold: 17 ft 0 in (5.18 m)
- Propulsion: Sails
- Sail plan: Full-rigged ship
- Armament: 1677 Establishment 72/60 guns; 26 × demi-cannons 54 cwt – 9.5 ft (LD); 26 × 12-pdr guns 32 cwt – 9 ft (UD); 10 × sakers 16 cwt – 7 ft (QD); 4 × sakers 16 cwt – 7 ft (Fc); 5 × 5 3-pdr guns 5 cwt – 5 ft (RH)

General characteristics after 1701 rebuild
- Class & type: 70-gun third rate ship of the line
- Tons burthen: 1,073 71/94 (bm)
- Length: 150 ft 6 in (45.9 m) (gundeck)
- Beam: 40 ft 4.5 in (12.3 m)
- Depth of hold: 16 ft 11 in (5.2 m)
- Propulsion: Sails
- Sail plan: Full-rigged ship
- Armament: 1685 Establishment 72/60 guns; 26 × demi-cannons 54 cwt – 9.5 ft (LD); 26 × demi-culverins (UD); 10 × sakers 16 cwt – 7 ft (QD); 4 × sakers 16 cwt – 7 ft (Fc); 5 × 5 3-pdr guns 5 cwt – 5 ft (RH)

HMS Hampton Court was a 70-gun third rate ship of the line of the Royal Navy, launched at Deptford Dockyard in 1678. Her initial commission was to move her to Chatham where she spent in the next ten years in Ordinary. She held an active commission for the War of the English Succession, participating in the Battles of Beachy Head and Barfleur. She was rebuilt at Blackwall in 1699/1701. During the War of Spanish Succession she served mainly in the Mediterranean. In 1707 she was taken by the French and incorporated into the French Navy for four years. She was sold to the Spanish in 1712. She was wrecked in Spanish service off the coast of Florida in a hurricane in 1715.

This was the first vessel to bear the name Hampton Court in the English and Royal Navy.

HMS Hampton Court was awarded the Battle Honours Barfleur 1692 and Marbella 1705.

== Construction and specifications ==
She was ordered in April 1677 as part of the "thirty ship" program that was authorised by parliament on 23 February 1677. She was designed and built at Deptford Dockyard by Master Shipwright John Shish. Her keel was laid in 1677 and she was launched on 10 July 1678. The third rate HMS Lenox (1678) was built at the same time in the dry dock adjacent to the slipway on which Hampton Court was built, with Lenox being the first started and completed. Both ships had the minor deviation from the specification for the 20 third-rates that parliament had agreed, in that there were only twelve gun ports on the upper gundeck, whilst the other ships in the same batch were built with thirteen.

Her dimensions were a gundeck of 150 feet 6 inches (45.87 metres) with a keel of 121 feet 3 inches (36.96 metres) for tonnage calculation with a breadth of 40 feet 1 inch (12.22 metres) and a depth of hold of 17 feet 0 inches (5.18 metres). Her builder's measure tonnage was calculated as 1,03621/94 tons (burthen). Her Draught was 18 feet 6 inches (5.64 metres).

Her initial gun armament was in accordance with the 1677 Establishment with 70/62 guns consisting of twenty-six demi-cannons (54 cwt, (Note: "cwt", or "hundredweight" refers to the weight of the gun itself) 9.5 ft) on the lower deck, twenty-four 12-pounder guns (32 cwt, 9 ft) on the upper deck, ten sakers (16 cwt, 7 ft) on the quarterdeck and four sakers (16 cwt, 7 ft) on the foc's'le with four 3-pounder guns (5 cwt, 5 ft) on the poop deck or roundhouse. Their initial manning establishment would be for a crew of 460/380/300 personnel. By 1688 she would carry 70 guns as per the 1685 Establishment, however, the demi-culverins replaced the 12-pounders on the upper deck. In 1696 she would still carry 70 guns consisting of twenty-two demi-cannons, four culverins, twenty-four demi-culverins, sixteen sakers, and four 3-pounder guns.

== Commissioned service ==
=== Service 1678 to 1699 ===
She was commissioned on 9 May 1678 under the command of Captain John Kirke until 17 May 1678 for transport to Chatham where she was placed in Ordinary. In November 1688 she was commissioned under Captain Henry Priestman during the abdication of James II and arrival of William III and Mary II. In 1689 she was under Captain John Munden as Flagship of Rear-Admiral Lord John Berkeley sailing with the Fleet. Captain John Layton held command from 1690 until his death on 2 January 1691. She was at the Battle of Beachy Head in Centre (Red) Squadron on 30 May 1690. During 1691 thru 1694 she was under command of Captain John Graydon. She fought in the Battle of Barfleur as a member of Centre (Red) Squadron, Centre Division between 19 and 22 June 1692. Captain Henry Robinson was in command during 1696/97 sailing with the Fleet. She would be rebuilt at Blackwall in 1699/1701.

=== Rebuild at Blackwall 1699-1701 ===
She was ordered on 27 September 1699 to be rebuilt under contract by Henry Johnson of Blackwall. She was launched/completed in 1701. Her dimensions were a gundeck of 150 feet 6 inches (45.87 meters) with a keel of 123 feet 10 inches (37.74 meters) for tonnage calculation with a breadth of 40 feet 4.5 inches (12.306 meters) and a depth of hold of 16 feet 11 inches (5.16 meters). Her builder's measure tonnage was calculated as 1,07371/94 tons.

She probably retained her armament as stated in the 1685 Establishment, though it is unclear if her armament was changed to the 1703 Establishment later. It is known that when completed her gun armament total at least 70 guns.

=== Service 1702 to 1707 ===
She was commissioned in 1702 under the command of Captain Charles Wager. He would remain in command until 1706. In July 1702 she escorted a North Sea convoy. By October she was with Admiral Sir Cloudisley Shovell's Fleet. In 1703 she went to the Mediterranean with Shovell's Fleet. On 10 March 1705 she was at the Battle of Marbella as a member of Vice-Admiral Sir John Leake's Fleet. This was the final attempt by the French to capture Gibraltar from the English. Admiral Leake won a crushing victory over the French as all five ships of the line were either captured or destroyed. Later in 1705 she was detached to Rear-Admiral Thomas Dilke's Squadron while remaining in the Mediterranean. She was at Alicante, Spain (on the south-east coast of Spain). In 1707 she was under the command of Captain George Clements at Barcelona, Spain.

== Loss ==
Hampton Court was captured in the action of 2 May 1707 by Forbin's squadron off Brighton (Beachy Head). She was incorporated into the French Navy and served from 1707 until 1711. She was sold to the Spanish at Dunkirk in 1712 and renamed Capitaine. The ship met her demise as a flagship of the ill-fated 1715 Treasure Fleet that was wrecked by a hurricane on the Florida Treasure Coast.

== See also ==
- List of ships captured in the 18th century
