= Battle of Málaga (1704) =

1704 battle of the War of the Spanish Succession

- Part of the War of the Spanish Succession
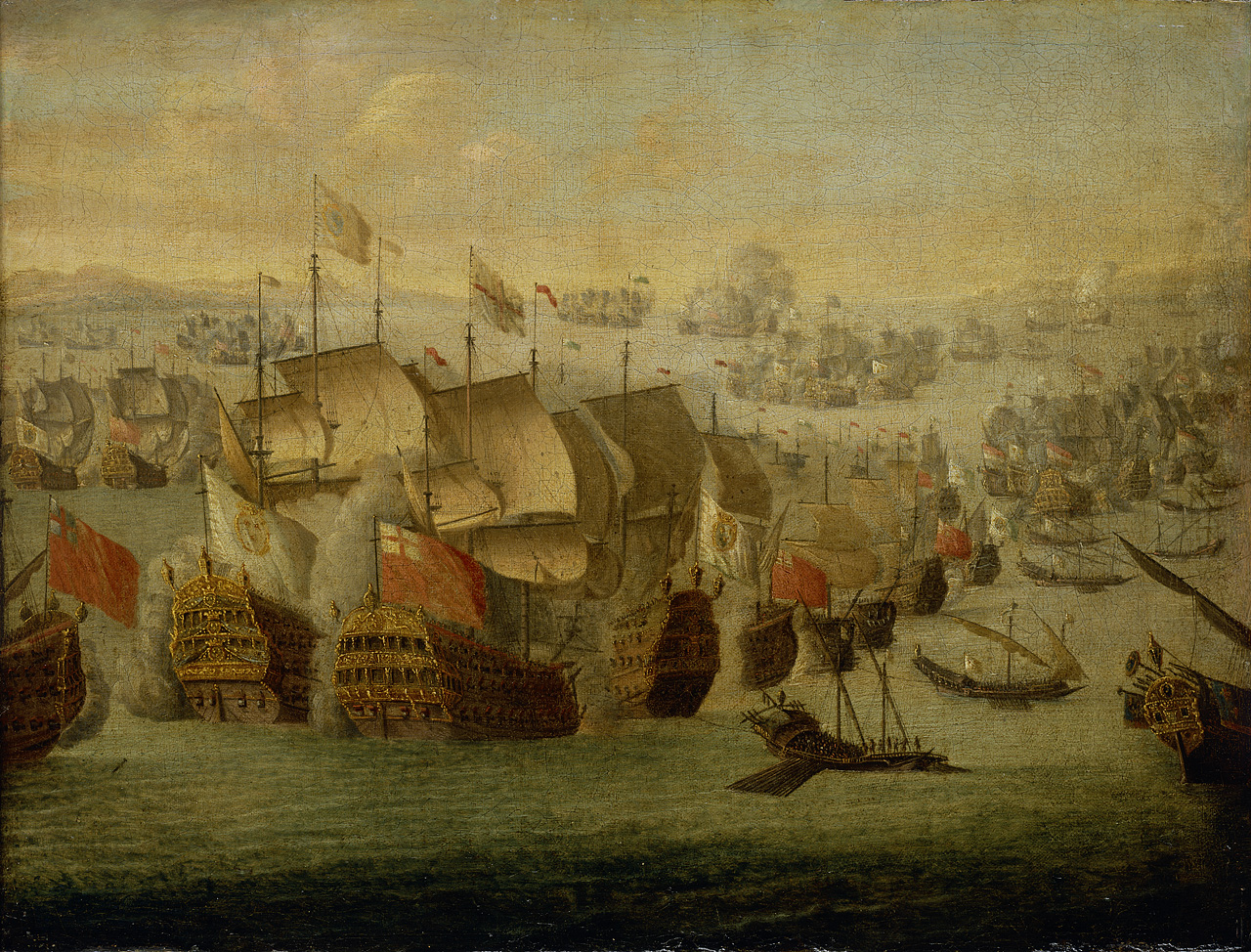
- The Battle of Malaga, 13 August 1704; Isaac Sailmaker, c. 1704
Date	24 August 1704
Location	Off Málaga, Mediterranean Sea
Result	Inconclusive

Belligerents
England; Dutch Republic	France; Spain

Commanders and leaders
(Kingdom of England) Sir George Rooke (Dutch Republic) Gerard Callenburgh	(Kingdom of France) Count of Toulouse (Kingdom of France) Count of Estrées

Strength
53 ships of the line 6 frigates 7 fire ships	50 ships of the line 9 frigates 9 fire ships 24 galleys

Casualties and losses
England: 695 killed 1,663 wounded Dutch Republic: 92 killed 268 wounded	1,500 killed 1,548 wounded

The Battle of Málaga, also known as the Battle of Vélez-Málaga, was a major fleet action which took place during the War of the Spanish Succession between an Anglo-Dutch fleet and a Franco-Spanish naval force on 24 August 1704. Both sides fought an intense engagement before the Anglo-Dutch fleet withdrew the next day. The French subsequently returned to Toulon, transforming the battle from a tactical stalemate into a strategic defeat, as they would not put out to sea again for the duration of the conflict. Occurring soon after the Anglo-Dutch capture of Gibraltar a few weeks prior, the battle served as one of the numerous engagements which took place for control over the settlement during the war.

In 1701, the War of the Spanish Succession broke out, pitting the Bourbon kingdoms of France and Spain against Grand Alliance, which included the English and Dutch. An Anglo-Dutch fleet under Sir George Rooke was sent into the Mediterranean in 1704, capturing Gibraltar on 4 August. Upon receiving news of the capture, the French dispatched a fleet to link up with the Spanish Navy and recapture it; Rooke received word of the attempt and mobilised his ships to intercept them. Rooke's ships spotted the Franco-Spanish fleet on 22 August, engaging them two days later. Both sides exchanged broadsides for several hours before the Anglo-Dutch fleet ran low of ammunition and withdrew the next day.

After the battle, both fleets returned home; strategically, the battle proved to be a success for the Grand Alliance, which saw their occupation of Gibraltar continue for the remainder of the conflict. Rooke unloaded as many men and material as he could before returning to England on 24 September. Upon receiving news of the loss of Gibraltar, Spanish Bourbons quickly moved to recapture it, beginning an investment in late September. However, several attempts to storm the settlement were repulsed by its garrison, and the siege was eventually lifted in May 1705. The battle of Málaga went on to play a role in solidifying the importance of a defensive line of battle in British and French tactical thinking.

== Background ==
In 1701, the War of the Spanish Succession broke out, pitting an anti-French coalition known as the Grand Alliance on one side and the Bourbon kingdoms of France and Spain on the other. The conflict erupted over a dispute on whether Bourbon prince Philip of Anjou, supported by King Louis XIV of France, or Habsburg royal Archduke Charles, backed by the Grand Alliance, would succeed to the Spanish throne and assume control over Spain's colonial empire after Charles II of Spain died on 1 November 1700. (Note: The Grand Alliance consisted of Austria, England, Scotland, the Dutch Republic, Savoy, Prussia and Portugal.)

Archduke Charles landed at Lisbon in March 1704 at the head of a large military expedition to conduct a campaign in the Iberian Peninsula. In May of that year, Royal Navy officer Sir George Rooke led a combined Anglo-Dutch fleet into the Mediterranean, accompanied by Austrian army officer Prince George of Hesse-Darmstadt and Dutch States Navy admiral Gerard Callenburgh. After an attempt to capture Barcelona (then under Bourbon control) on 30 May was frustrated by a lack of support from local residents, the expedition sailed for the Portuguese port of Lagos. There, they linked up with an English squadron commanded by Sir Cloudesley Shovell on 27 June and proceeded to lay anchor near Tétouan.

While at anchor, senior officers in the Anglo-Dutch fleet drafted a plan to attack Gibraltar, which was under Bourbon control. On 28 July, they presented their plan to Prince George, who gave it his approval. Beginning on 1 August, a Grand Alliance force laid siege to Gibraltar, capturing it three days later. News of the capture soon reached France, and the French Navy responded by combined their squadrons at Toulon and Brest into one fleet (consisting of 50 ships of the line, 24 galleys, nine frigates and nine fire ships) under the command of the Count of Toulouse and Victor-Marie d'Estrées which set sail for Gibraltar roughly a week after its capture. Rooke received intelligence that a French fleet had been spotted approaching Gibraltar; leaving half of the marines under his command there, he immediately set off with the Anglo-Dutch fleet (which comprised 53 ships of the line, six frigates and seven fire ships) to engage the French.

== Battle ==
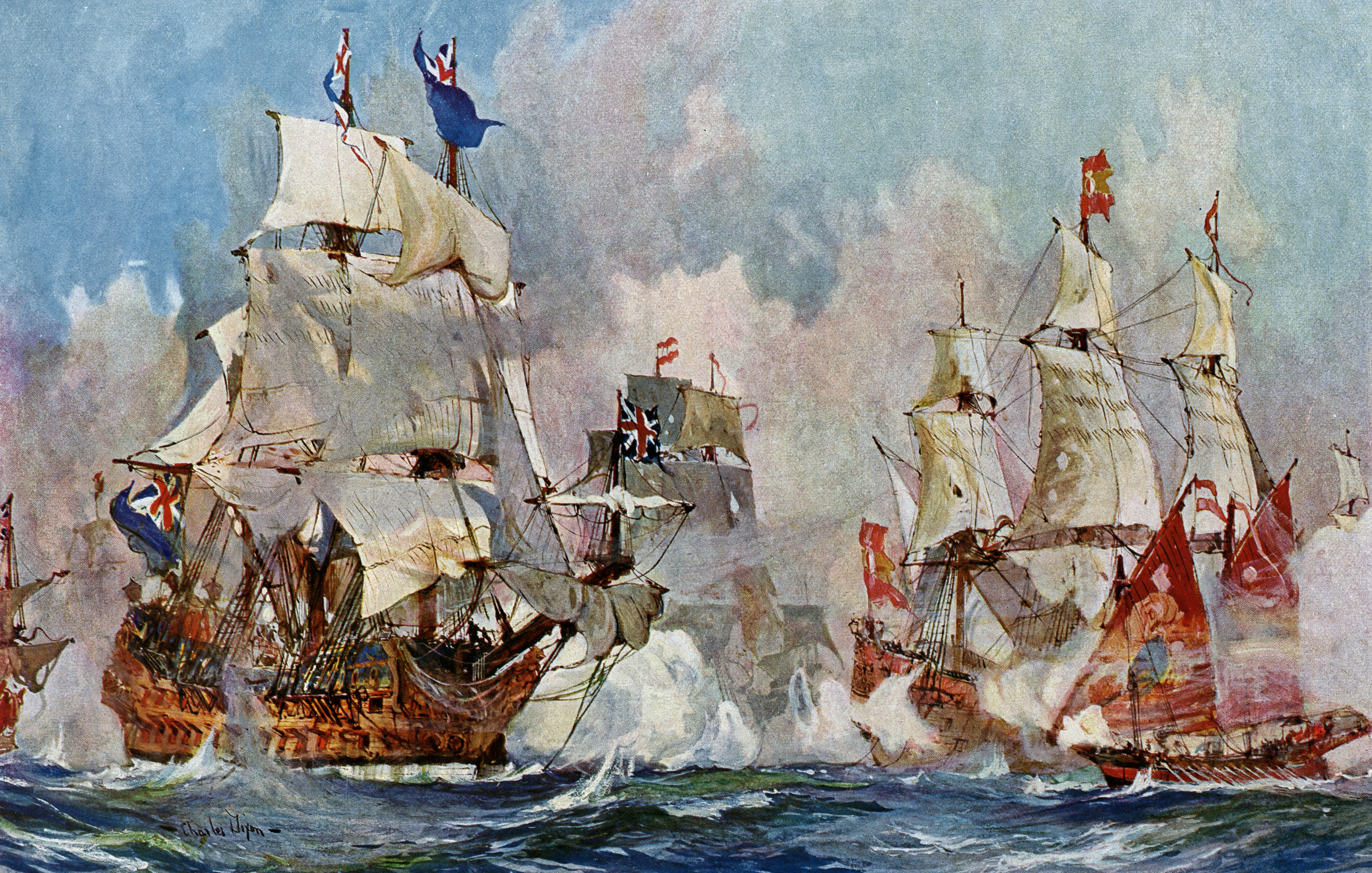
Painting of HMS Prince George at the battle by Charles Dixon

On 24 August, the two fleets engaged each other off the city of Málaga after the French fleet was spotted on 22 August. Rooke and Callenburgh ordered their combined fleet to form a line of battle, while the French commanders directed their ships to form a parallel crescent. A general engagement subsequently ensued over the course of the day, with the two fleets exchanging damaging broadsides which inflicted numerous casualties. French galleys would occasionally sail into the battle line to tow damaged ships of the line out of the battlefield to safety. Meanwhile, the Anglo-Dutch fleet suffered from a shortage of round shot and gunpowder during the battle, having expended large quantities of ammunition bombarding Gibraltar during their capture of the settlement.

As the night set in, senior officers in the Anglo-Dutch fleet ordered a redistribution of ammunition among their ships to sustain the engagement, though by the next morning each ship only had approximately ten cannonballs left per gun. When a change in the wind direction gave the French fleet a favourable weather gage, Rooke and Callenburgh decided to withdraw, deciding that the shortage of ammunition onboard their ships meant that they could no longer continue the engagement. As noted by historian Cathal J. Nolan, the French captains present proved reluctant to pursue, being unaware of the superior gunnery skills of their crews, which had killed 3,000 sailors, marines and officers from the Anglo-Dutch fleet (in comparison, the French lost 1,500 men killed and wounded).

During the battle, neither side lost a single ship, though both fleets had suffered extensive damage; many ships in the Anglo-Dutch fleet had lost some or all of their masts. On 26 August, the two fleets sighted each other again, though no engagement occurred as both sides were reluctant to commit their ships to battle, with the French in particular being concerned about a shortage of ammunition. The French fleet eventually returned to Toulon, claiming a victory in the engagement based on their enemies unwillingness to engage on the 26th. However, the French decision to return to Toulon turned what up until that point had been a tactical draw into a strategic defeat, as France never put a fleet to sea again for the duration of the conflict, allowing the Grand Alliance to gain naval supremacy in the Mediterranean. Once he had ensured that the French Navy was no longer pursuing him, Rooke ordered his fleet to sail for Gibraltar for repairs on 19 August.

== Aftermath ==
Having managed to successfully counter the French naval threat, Rooke left as much men, weaponry and supplies as he could at Gibraltar before sailing for home on 24 September. Before leaving, he split off a portion of his fleet (consisting of 18 warships), ordering his subordinate Sir John Leake to lead it in undergoing naval patrols off the Portuguese and Spanish coastlines. Spanish Bourbons had already received news of the loss of Gibraltar, and in early September the Marquis of Villadarias led 4,000 Bourbon troops to the vicinity of the region, who were supplemented by civilian refugees which had fled the settlement. The Marquis of Villadarias also made plans to reinforce his army with 8,000 more men in anticipation of an upcoming Bourbon siege of Gibraltar.

Aware that the Spanish would soon lay siege to Gibraltar, Prince George set about reinforcing the settlement's fortifications and garrison. In late September, the Marquis of Villadarias began an investment of Gibraltar, being reinforced by 3,000 French soldiers on 4 October. Over the next month, he launched several assaults on the settlement, inflicting numerous casualties on the defenders. After receiving supplies from Leake on 21 October, the garrison repulsed a major Franco-Spanish assault on 11 November. The siege soon settled into a stalemate, punctuated by naval engagements and another failed Bourbon assault on 7 February 1705. It was eventually abandoned on May 1705, and Gibraltar would remain under Grand Alliance control for the rest of the war.

According to Canadian historian Nicholas Tracy in his 2007 work Nelson's Battles: The Triumph of British Seapower, the naval engagement off Málaga "established in both British and French tactical thinking the absolute importance of maintaining the defensive strength of a well-ordered line of battle." Naval officers in both navies proceeded to place a greater emphasis on training their crews in gunnery skills after the engagement, while the French Navy's belief in the "defensive power of a well-ordered line" was reinforced as a result of the battle. Though both sides had fire ships at their disposal, none were expended during the battle, a fact which Tracy claims was a consequence of 18th-century naval battles increasingly taking place in the open sea (as opposed to their 17th-century counterparts, many of which prominently featured the use of fire ships). By the late 18th century, fire ships had largely fallen out of use among the naval powers of Europe.
