= List of ships named Seahorse =

A number of ships have been named Seahorse or Sea Horse after the marine creature, including:

== Merchant ships ==
- The transport ship Sea Horse was wrecked in Tramore Bay on 30 January 1816 with the loss of 376 of the 402 people on board. She was on a voyage from Ramsgate to Cork.
- MV Seahorse - a Tanzanian tanker in service 2012-16
- MV Sea Horse - a ship captured by pirates in 2009

== Naval ships ==
=== Royal Navy ===
- HMS Seahorse (1626) was a ship captured in 1626 and last mentioned in 1635.
- HMS Seahorse (1654) was a hoy captured in 1654 and sold in 1655.
- HMS Seahorse (1694 fireship) was a 10-gun fireship purchased from the Dutch in 1694, later used as a water boat, and sunk as a foundation in 1698.
- HMS Seahorse (1694 sixth rate) was a 24-gun sixth rate launched in 1694 and wrecked in 1704.
- HMS Seahorse (1709) was a 14-gun sixth rate launched in 1709 and wrecked in 1711.
- HMS Seahorse (1712) was a 20-gun sixth rate launched in 1712, rebuilt in 1727 and sold in 1748.
- HMS Seahorse (1748) was a 24-gun sixth rate launched in 1748 and sold in 1784.
- HMS Seahorse (1794) was a 38-gun fifth rate launched in 1794 and broken up in 1819.
- HMS Seahorse (1830) was a 46-gun fifth rate launched in 1830. She was converted to a screw frigate in 1847, then a screw mortar vessel in 1856. She was renamed Lavinia and used as a coal hulk in 1870 and was sold in 1902.
- HMS Seahorse (1880) was a 670-ton twin-screw fleet tug and survey ship, launched in 1881 and sold for scrap in 1920.
- HMS Seahorse (98S) was an S-class submarine launched in 1932 and sunk in 1940.

=== United States Navy ===
- USS Sea Horse (1812) was a one-gun schooner, purchased by the Navy in 1812 for service in the War of 1812. She was beached and burned to prevent capture in 1814.
- USS Seahorse (SS-304) was a Balao-class submarine, commissioned in 1943 and stricken in 1967.
- USS Seahorse (SSN-669) was a Sturgeon-class submarine, commissioned in 1969 and stricken in 1995.

== Coast Guard ==
- USCGC Sea Horse (WPB-87361) a Marine Protector-class patrol boat based in Portsmouth, Virginia.
