= List of ship launches in 1695 =

The list of ship launches in 1695 includes a chronological list of some ships launched in 1695.

| Date | Ship | Class | Builder | Location | Country | Notes |
|---|---|---|---|---|---|---|
| 7 January | Yarmouth | Third rate | Nicholas Barrett | Harwich | England | For Royal Navy. |
| 4 February | Lichfield | Fourth rate | William Stigant | Portsmouth | England | For Royal Navy. |
| 5 February | Gloucester | Fourth rate | Thomas Clements | Bristol | England | For Royal Navy. |
| 6 February | Shrewsbury | Third rate | Stigant | Portsmouth Dockyard | England | For Royal Navy. |
| 6 March | Chichester | Third rate | Lee | Chatham Dockyard | England | For Royal Navy. |
| 13 March | Fede Guerriera | Fede Guerriera-class ship of the line | Stefano Conti | Venice | Republic of Venice | For Venetian Navy. |
| 21 March | Fenice | Fede Guerriera-class ship of the line | Iseppo Depeiri di Zuanne | Venice | Republic of Venice | For Venetian Navy. |
| 18 April | Granado | Serpent-class bomb vessel | Robert & John Castle | Deptford | England | For Royal Navy. |
| 20 April | Coventry | Fourth rate | Fisher Harding | Deptford Dockyard | England | For Royal Navy. |
| April | France | Galley | Simon Chabert | Marseille | Kingdom of France | For French Navy. |
| 4 May | Basilisk | Serpent-class bomb vessel | William Redding | Wapping | England | For Royal Navy. |
| 14 May | Fougueux | Fourth rate | Blaise Pangalo | Brest | Kingdom of France | For French Navy. |
| 3 June | Orford | Third rate | Frame | Hull | England | For Royal Navy. |
| June | Téméraire | Fourth rate | Etienne Hubac | Brest | Kingdom of France | For French Navy. |
| 27 August | Iride | San Lorenzo Zustinian-class ship of the line | Antonio Filetta | Venice | Republic of Venice | For Venetian Navy. |
| 29 August | San Sebastiàn | San Lorenzo Zustinian-class ship of the line | Iseppo di Piero de Pieri | Venice | Republic of Venice | For Venetian Navy. |
| August | Trident | Third rate | François Coulomb | Toulon | Kingdom of France | For French Navy. |
| 10 September | Solide | Fourth rate | Blaise Pangalo | Brest | Kingdom of France | For French Navy. |
| 12 September | Lincoln | Fourth rate | Lawrence | Woolwich Dockyard | England | For Royal Navy. |
| 14 September | Harwich | Fourth rate | Robert & John Castle | Deptford | England | For Royal Navy. |
| 16 September | Burlington | Fourth rate | Henry Johnson | Blackwall Yard | England | For Royal Navy. |
| 16 September | Severn | Fourth rate | Henry Johnson | Blackwall Yard | England | For Royal Navy. |
| September | Content | Third rate | François Coulomb | Toulon | Kingdom of France | For French Navy. |
| 15 October | Pendennis | Fourth rate | Robert & John Castle | Deptford | England | For Royal Navy. |
| 31 October | Windsor | Fourth rate | Snelgrove | Deptford | England | For Royal Navy. |
| 12 November | Cumberland | Third rate | Wyatt | Bursledon | England | For Royal Navy. |
| 21 December | Cambridge | Third rate | Harding | Deptford Dockyard | England | For Royal Navy. |
| Unknown date | Arend | Sixth rate frigate | Hendrik Cardinaal | Amsterdam | Dutch Republic | For Dutch Navy. |
| Unknown date | Blast | Serpent-class bomb vessel | Henry Johnson | Blackwall Yard | England | For Royal Navy. |
| Unknown date | Bliksem | Bomb vessel | | | Dutch Republic | For Dutch Navy. |
| Unknown date | Boeier | Fireship | | | Dutch Republic | For Dutch Navy. |
| Unknown date | Brielle | Third rate | Van Leeuwen | Rotterdam | Dutch Republic | For Dutch Navy. |
| Unknown date | Dwingeland | Galiot-rigged bomb vessel | | | Dutch Republic | For Dutch Navy. |
| Unknown date | Gewald | Galiot-rigged bomb vessel | | | Dutch Republic | For Dutch Navy. |
| Unknown date | Havik | Sixth rate frigate | | Amsterdam | Dutch Republic | For Dutch Navy. |
| Unknown date | Volontaire | Fourth rate | François Coulomb | Toulon | Kingdom of France | For French Navy. |
| Unknown date | Neptunus | Sixth rate hooker | Van Leeuwen | Rotterdam | Dutch Republic | For Dutch Navy. |
| Unknown date | Rotterdam | Fourth rate | Van Leeuwen | Rotterdam | Dutch Republic | For Dutch Navy. |
| Unknown date | Schrik | Galiot-rigged bomb vessel | | | Dutch Republic | For Dutch Navy. |
| Unknown date | Scout | Yacht | William Stigant | Portsmouth Dockyard | Kingdom of England | For Royal Navy. |
| Unknown date | Swift | Brigantine | Robert Lee | Chatham Dockyard | England | For Royal Navy. |
| Unknown date | Swift | Advice boat | George Moore | Arundel | England | For Royal Navy. |
| Unknown date | Valk | Sixth rate | | Dunkerque | Kingdom of France | For Dutch Navy. |
| Unknown date | Vredemaker | Galiot-rigged bomb vessel | | | Dutch Republic | For Dutch Navy. |
| Unknown date | Vrijheid | First rate | Hendrik Cardinaal | Amsterdam | Dutch Republic | For Dutch Navy. |
| Unknown date | Wouw | Sixth rate frigate | | Amsterdam | Dutch Republic | For Dutch Navy. |
| Unknown date | Zeepaard | Sixth rate Hooker | | Rotterdam | Dutch Republic | For Dutch Navy. |
