= Battle of Cape Passaro =

1718 battle of the War of the Quadruple Alliance

- Part of the War of the Quadruple Alliance
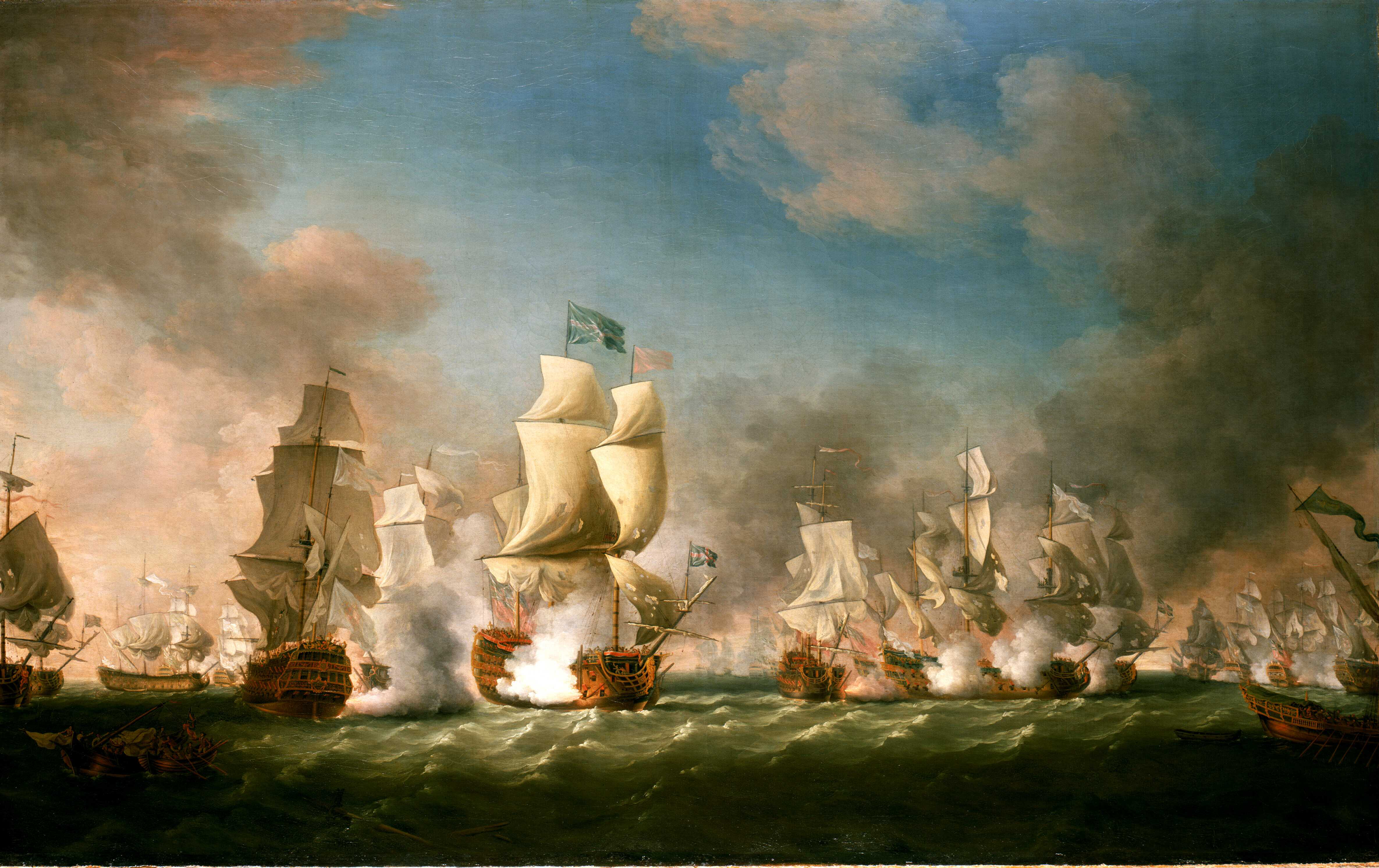
- 1767 painting of the battle
Date	11–12 August 1718
Location	Off Cape Passaro, Mediterranean Sea 36.6869°N 15.1483°E
Result	British victory

Belligerents
Great Britain	Spain

Commanders and leaders
Sir George Byng; Charles Cornwall; George Delaval	José Antonio de Gaztañeta (surrendered)

Strength
21 ships of the line; 1 frigate; 2 fireships; 2 bomb vessels; 1 storeship; 1 hospital ship	12 ships of the line; 18 frigates; 7 galleys; 2 sloops; 2 fireships

Casualties and losses
500 killed or wounded	2,400 killed or wounded; 3,600 captured; 7 ships of the line captured; 1 ship of the line destroyed; 6 frigates captured; 1 frigate scuttled

The Battle of Cape Passaro (also known as the Battle of Avola or Battle of Syracuse) was fought on 11–12 August 1718 off Cape Passaro between a British fleet under Admiral of the Fleet Sir George Byng and a Spanish fleet under Lieutenant-general José Antonio de Gaztañeta during the War of the Quadruple Alliance. Fought off the southern tip of Sicily, which Spanish forces had invaded and occupied earlier that year, the battle proved to be the most significant event of the entire war.

Though Britain and Spain were at peace when the battle was fought the British were already committed to supporting the Italian ambitions of Charles VI, Holy Roman Emperor, which included driving the Spanish out of Sicily. The battle was fought without a formal declaration of war but once the Spanish fired on the nearest British ships,this gave Byng his excuse to attack. The outnumbered Spanish fleet suffered a decisive defeat, losing seven ships of the line and six frigates in a single day; several more Spanish warships were scuttled by their crews off the Sicilian coast. The Spanish army in Sicily was isolated, and four months later the War of the Quadruple Alliance was formally declared.

== Background ==
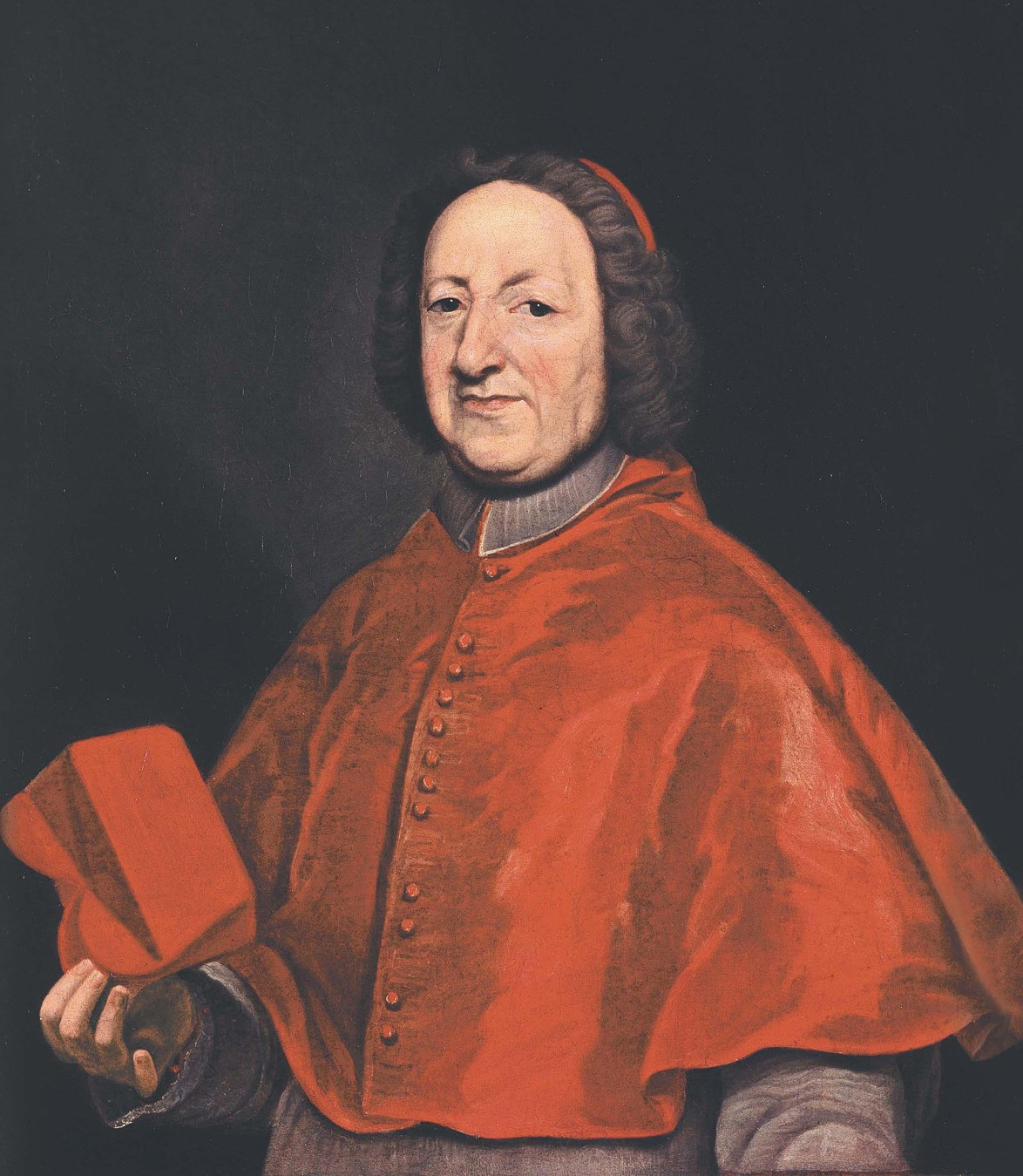
Giulio Alberoni

On 11 April 1713, after the War of the Spanish Succession, the Treaty of Utrecht was signed between France and the Kingdom of Great Britain, the United Provinces, the Kingdom of Prussia, the Kingdom of Portugal and the Duchy of Savoy. It marked the end of the Spanish Empire in Europe, as the Spanish Netherlands, the Kingdom of Naples, the Duchy of Milan and Sardinia were ceded to Austria, the Kingdom of Sicily to Savoy, Prussian Guelders to the Kingdom of Prussia, and Minorca and Gibraltar to Great Britain. France had succeeded in placing a king of her own royal house on a neighbouring throne, but the ambitions expressed in the wars of Louis XIV had been defeated and the European system based on the balance of power largely directed by Britain was preserved.

The British gains at the expense of the French and Spanish allowed it to strengthen her naval power. Gibraltar and Port Mahon in the Mediterranean and the colonies of Nova Scotia and Newfoundland in North America proved useful to extend and protect British trade. In comparison, the Spanish Navy was old and many of their ships needed refitting. Philip ordered more shipbuilding to commence in the American and Spanish shipyards. The major political figure Cardinal Giulio Alberoni, who had come from the Duchy of Parma, proceeded to reorganise the royal administration. Alberoni had promised Philip to put Spain in a strong position to recover Sicily and Naples if there were five years of peace. Alberoni was even willing to help Philip V to overthrow the Regent of France, Philip of Orleans, and alienate that country in order to grant trade benefits to Britain with the aim of isolating Austria.

The British monarch George I, who was also Elector of Hanover, felt threatened by Alberoni who thought he would undermine the power of Emperor Charles VI. Alberoni on hearing this withdrew all claims. This, together with Philip's claims over the French throne, turned Great Britain and France against Spain. Both countries, jointly with the United Provinces, had formed the so-called Triple Alliance a year before to maintain the balance of power in the continent. Meanwhile, both Austria and Spain were at loggerheads over Sicily. The British statesmen preferred the island to be ceded to their former ally rather than Spain. France, under the weakness of Philip of Orleans agreed, and it was proposed to modify the Treaty of Utrecht and force Victor Amadeus II of Savoy to exchange Sicily for Sardinia. The detention of the Spanish Grand Inquisitor José Molinés at Milan however by orders of the Emperor gave Spain a pretext to initiate military hostilities in Italy.

== Prelude ==
On 22 July 1717, a large Spanish fleet set sail from Barcelona with an army led by the Flemish nobleman Lieutenant General Jean François de Bette, Marquis of Lede. This force then captured the island of Sardinia. At the same time negotiations had ensued between Austria, Spain, and France in order to avoid a war. The British and French envoys at the same time offered Philip V the Duchies of Parma and Tuscany, and also to renounce Charles VI's claim to the Spanish throne, if Philip abandoned Sicily and accepted Sardinia. In view of Alberoni's negatives, even Gibraltar was offered. The Cardinal was strengthening Spain's position in Europe by forming an alliance with Russia and Sweden, with the aim of restoring the House of Stuart to the British throne.

=== Byng sent to the Mediterranean ===
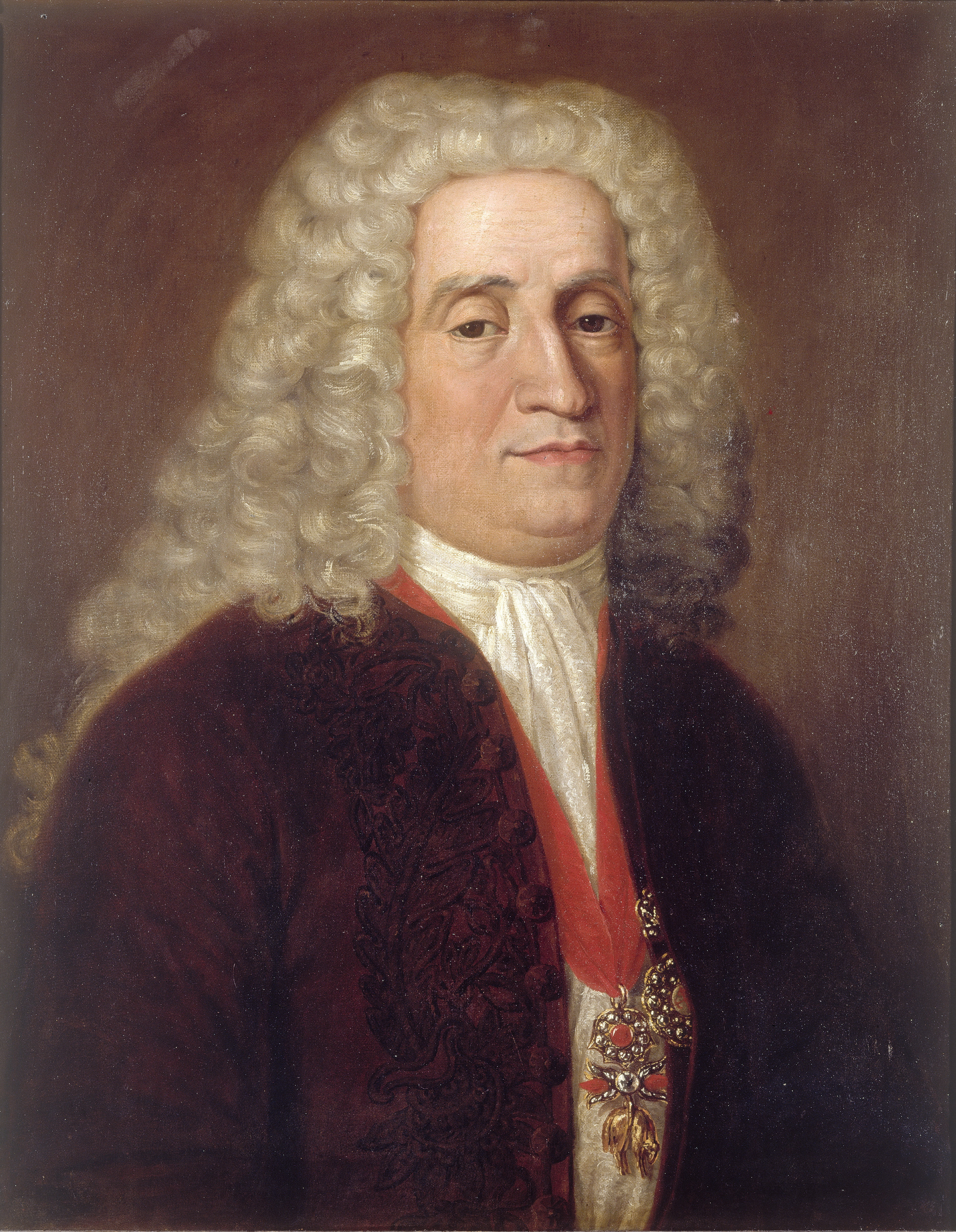
Portrait of José Patiño by Jean Ranc commander of the Spanish expedition

In the early months of 1718 a large number of Royal Naval vessels began to be commissioned and refitted; this alarmed the Spanish ambassador, the Marquis of Monteleon. Admiral George Byng, a man of long experience, was appointed Commander-in-Chief of the Mediterranean on 24 March. He was, upon his arrival there to inform the King of Spain, the Viceroy of Naples (at that time Count Wirich Philipp von Daun) and the Governor of Milan (the Prince Maximilian Karl of Löwenstein–Wertheim), that he had been sent to settle the differences between Spain and Austria.

Byng set sail from Spithead on 15 June with a fleet of twenty ships of the line, two fireships, two bomb vessels, a storeship, one hospital ship and two bomb tenders. On 30 June he arrived at Cádiz and sent a letter to the British ambassador at Madrid, William Stanhope, informing Philip V of the presence of the British fleet. Alberoni wrote Byng that if he attacked the Spanish fleet he should prepare for a humiliating defeat. Stanhope replied that Britain was acting only as a mediator. Nine days later, Alberoni wrote to Stanhope that Byng would execute his sovereign's orders.

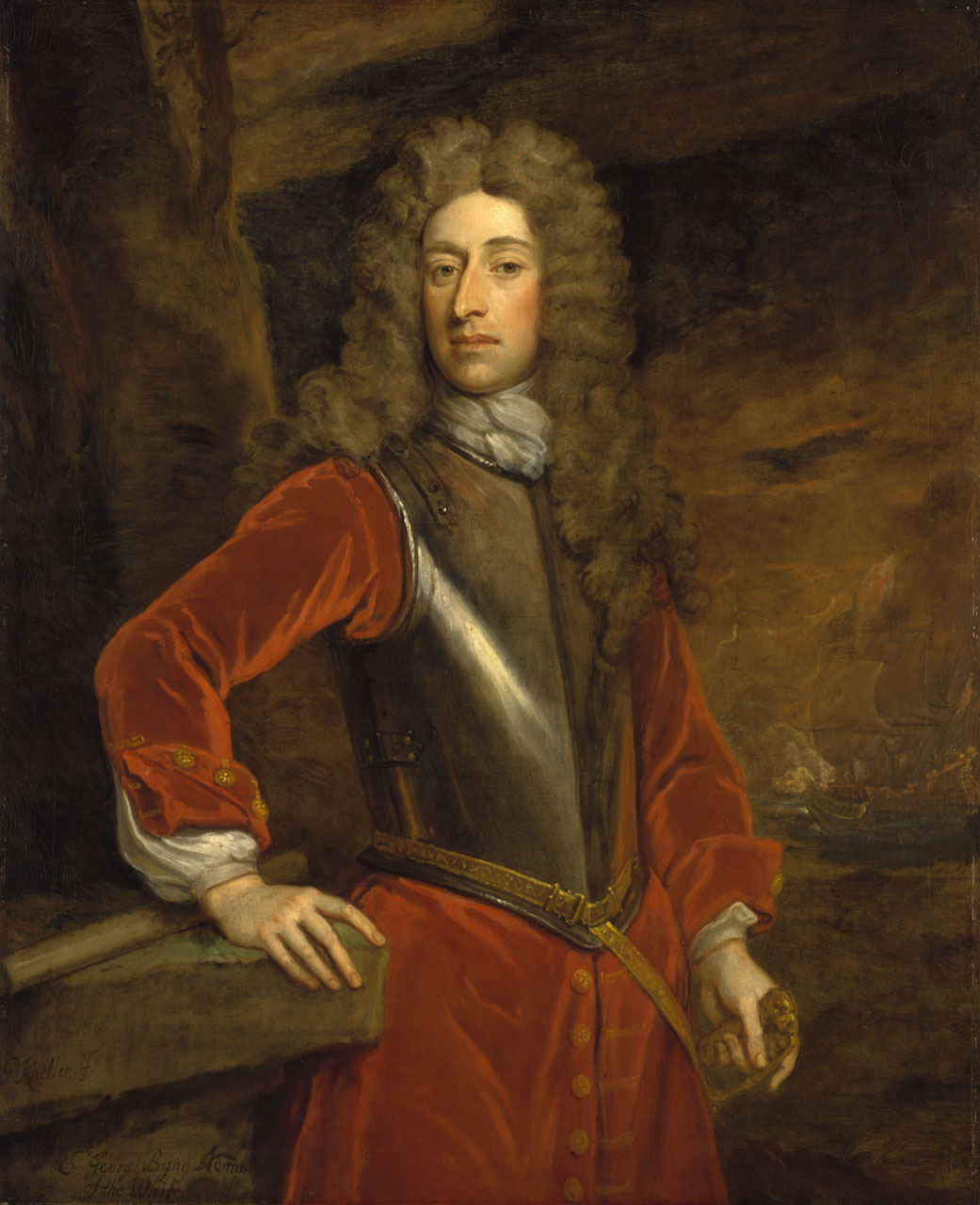
Admiral Sir George Byng. Oil on canvas by Sir Godfrey Kneller

Byng resumed his voyage and by 8 July the British fleet was rejoined off Cape Spartel by the two ships with news of the Spanish fleet's departure from Barcelona on 18 June. Byng was joined by Vice-admiral Charles Cornwall with a small division of two ships from Gibraltar, Argyll and Charles Galley. On 23 July Byng anchored off Port-Mahon and while reinforcing the garrison there was told that the Spanish fleet had been seen on 30 June off Naples. Two days later, the British fleet set sail, arriving at the Bay of Naples on 1 August.

=== Spanish invasion of Sicily ===
On 18 June, a Spanish expeditionary force set sail from Barcelona. It consisted of twelve ships of line, seventeen frigates, seven galleys, two fireships and two bomb vessels, which escorted 276 troopships and 123 tartanes under Vice-Admiral Antonio de Gaztañeta and the General Quartermaster of the Spanish Navy, José Patiño. This fleet carried aboard 36,000 infantrymen and 8,000 horse, along with artillery, supplies, and ammunition again under the command of Marquis of Lede. Their objective was the island of Sicily. On 30 June, having embarked reinforcements at the Bay of Cagliari between 25 and 27 June, the Spanish fleet came in sight of the city of Palermo. The Austrian force, surprised by Spanish numbers, evacuated Palermo. A month later, most of the island had fallen to the Spaniards with little or nor resistance, with the exception of Messina and a few coastal fortresses.

As Victor Amadeus II of Savoy had agreed to surrender Sicily to the Emperor, the Austrian Viceroy of Naples, Wirich Philipp von Daun, asked Byng to transport 2,000 German infantry under General Wetzel to the citadel of Messina. Byng agreed and sailed from Naples on 6 August, while the Spanish fleet was anchored off Paradiso.

Byng also proposed a "cessation of arms" in Sicily for two months, but Lede declined. With this offer rejected, Byng was left with no choice but to help the Imperialists and Savoyards resist Spanish attack. The British fleet arrived at Messina but were discovered by a Spanish felucca on 8 August, heading to the point of the Faro. The Marquis of Mari warned Gaztañeta and Patiño of the inferiority of the Spanish fleet, and the Irish-born Squadron Chief George Camocke, a former officer in the British Royal Navy, proposed that the fleet anchor in the Paradiso roadstead where it could be assisted with shore batteries. This defensive position would, according to Cammock, favour the Spanish ships, as the strong currents of the Faro would throw Byng over them, thus avoiding a feared long-range cannonade. Gaztañeta and Patiño, however, were confident of the peaceful intentions of Byng due to Alberoni's letters, and they decided to sail to Malta to join forces with Rear-Admiral Baltasar Vélez de Guevara.

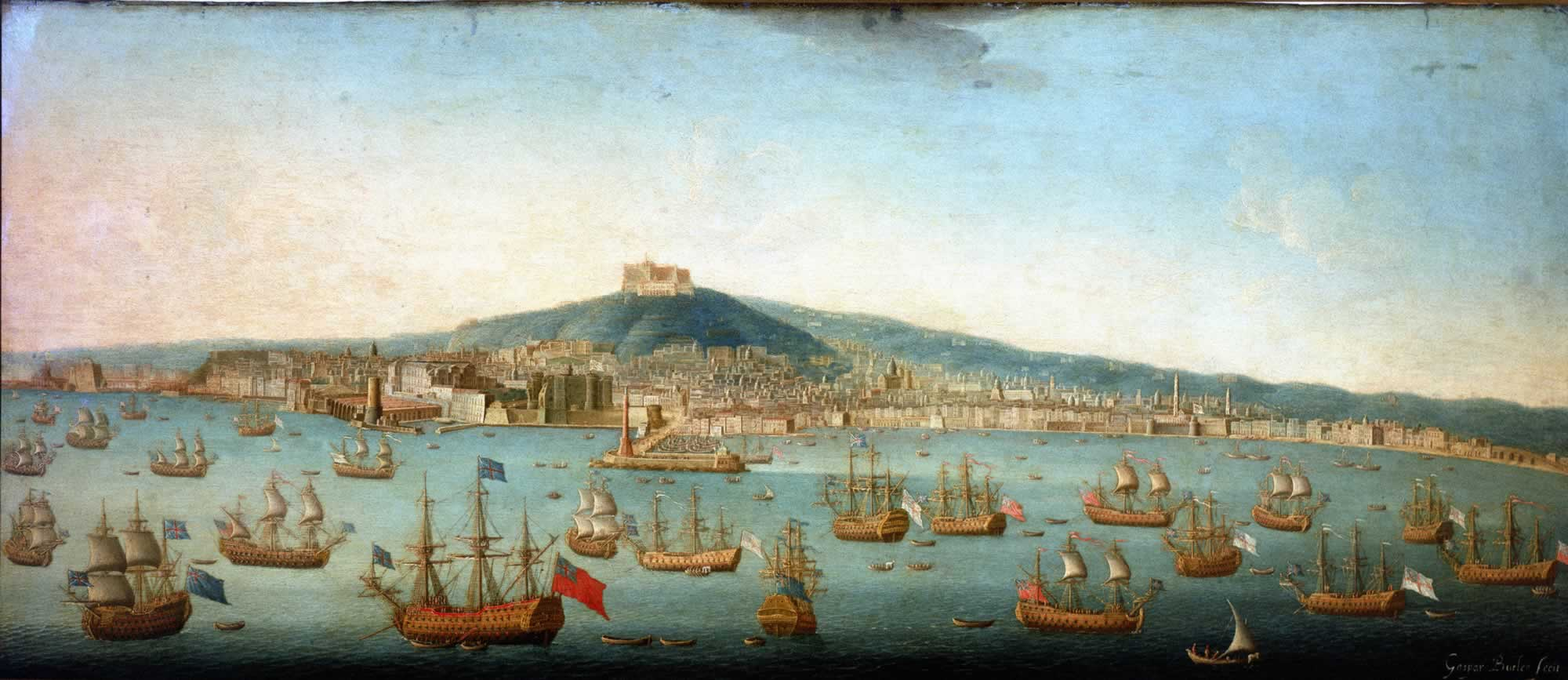
View of the Bay of Naples with Admiral Byng's Fleet at Anchor, 1 August 1718. Painting by Gaspar Butler.

== Battle ==
=== Fight against the Spanish rear ===
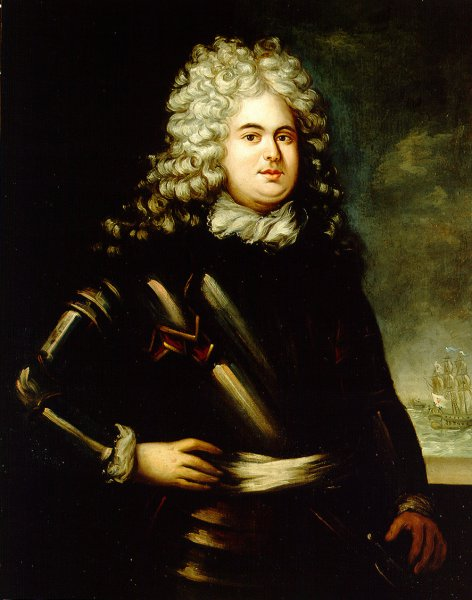
Esteban de Mari, Marquis of Mari. Anonymous copy of an 18th-century work.

Admiral Nicholas Haddock painting possibly by Hans Hysing

The Spanish fleet sailed from the Faro Point in disorder. No defensive disposition was taken by Gaztañeta, except to leave behind two frigates to follow the British fleet at a distance. As Byng stood in off Faro Point, both ships were detected. At the same time, a felucca from the Calabrian coast informed the British admiral that the Spanish fleet had been seen from the hills laying in. Byng dispatched German troops they were carrying to Reggio under escort of two of his ships while he headed to Faro point and sent scouts ahead. At noon they discovered the Spanish fleet, drawn into a line of battle: 12 ships of the line, 18 frigates, seven galleys, two sloops and two fireships. Byng followed them during the rest of the day. A Spanish account of the battle said that, on the morning of 10 August, the Spanish ships saluted the British ones as they approached, not showing, therefore, any sign of belligerence. The night passed with fair weather; small winds and sometimes calm. The following morning the Spanish fleet was dispersed, with ships divided into three large groups separated from each other. Gaztañeta tried then to form a line of battle by towing his ships of the line with the galleys, but had no time.

The Marquis of Mari, who commanded the Spanish rear, had under his command the ship of line El Real, frigates San Isidro, Tigre and Águila de Nantes, two bomb vessels, a fireship and a number of storeships, besides the seven galleys. Mari had lagged behind and was near the shore off Avola. The British vessels were close to them, and Byng dispatched Captain George Walton of Canterbury with five more vessels to chase them. Argyll fired two shots near El Real, while Canterbury fired three more. Then, Mari's ship returned fire and the battle ensued with British at an advantage. The Marquis, having his ship badly mauled by the British gunfire, resolved to drive his squadron ashore, and later set fire to the ships to avoid capture. His own ship sustained fifty casualties, killed and wounded, and had her rigging severely damaged. She was run aground and her crew escaped inland, but the ship was refloated by her British captors. Two of the Spanish frigates were completely burned; their crews also escaped. Sorpresa, under Captain Miguel de Sada, was the only ship which offered battle, but were forced to surrender, having sustained heavy damage and casualties. The other Spanish vessels struck their colours after a brief engagement, following which the British took possession of them.

=== Attack on the Spanish centre ===
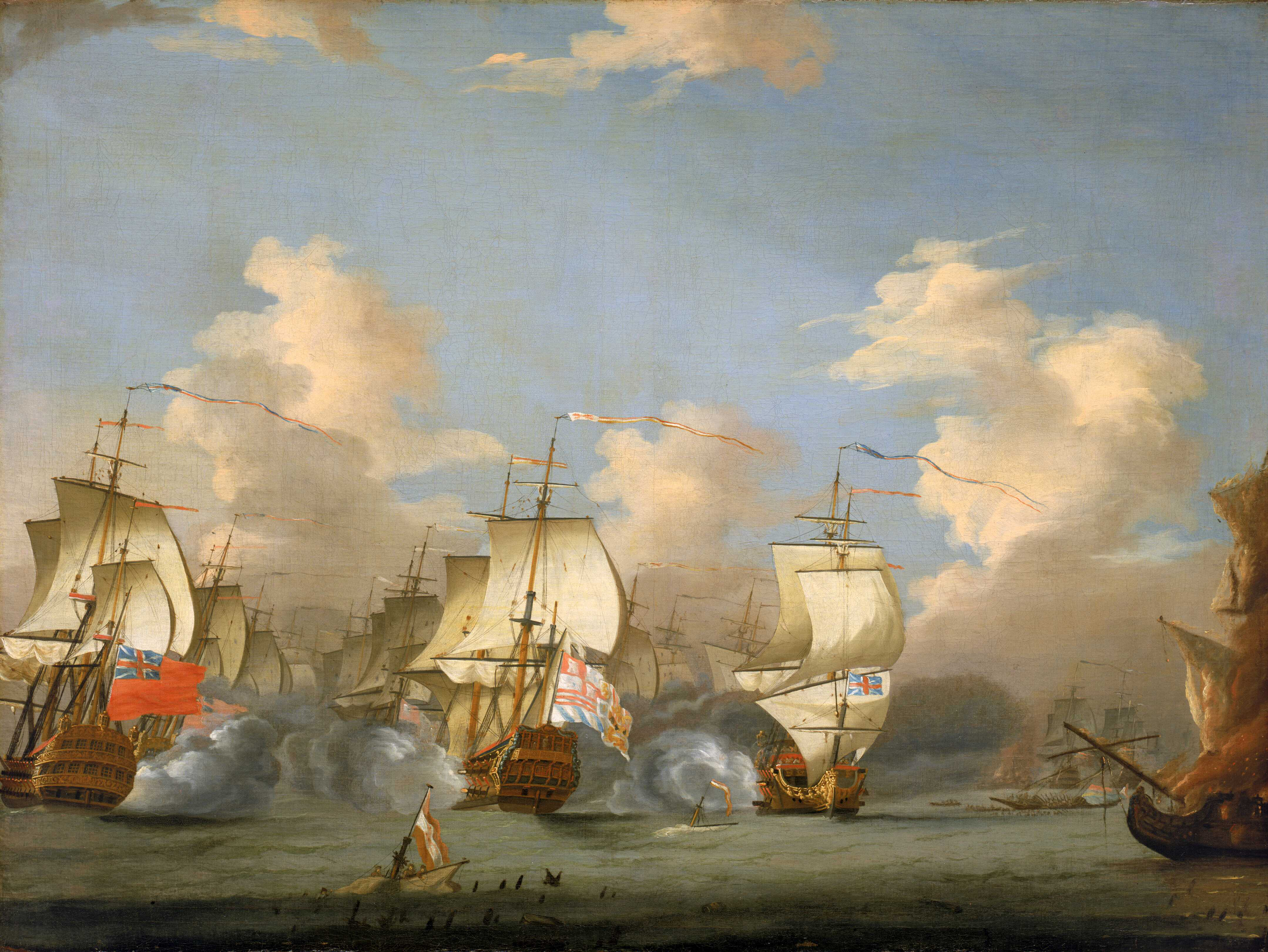
The Spanish flagship San Felipe flanked on either side by British ships, probably Superbe and Kent – painting by Peter Monamy.

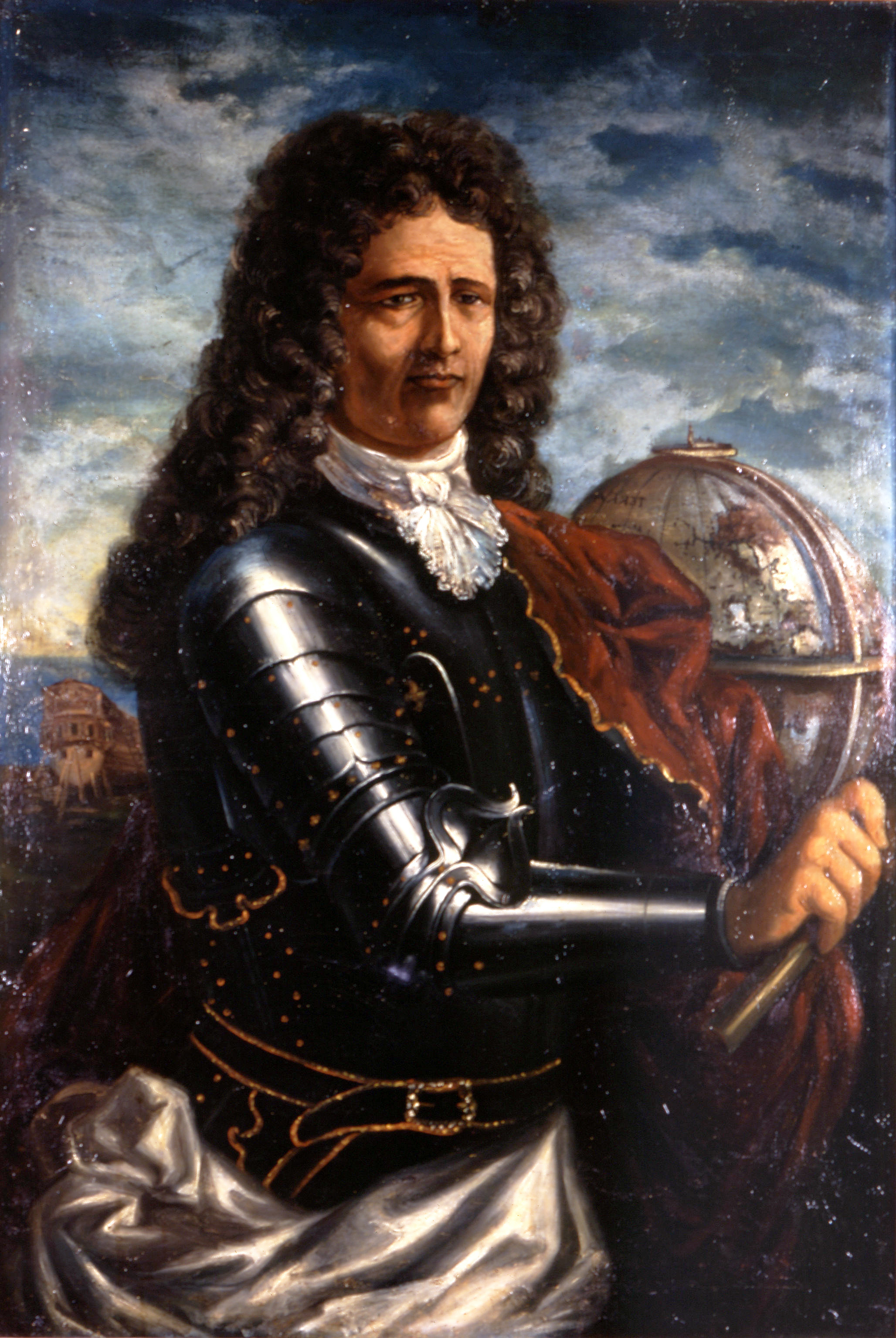
Antonio de Gaztañeta

With the Spanish rear now severed from the main fleet, Byng committed most of his vessels in pursuing Gaztañeta's squadron, which continued its way towards Cape Passaro. The Spanish admiral had with him six ships of the line and four frigates, but had not succeeded in forming a line of battle. Oxford and Grafton were the first two British ships of the line to engage Gaztañeta's centre. At 10 am, as they approached, the disorganised Spanish vessels opened fire. The two British ships returned fired, having been ordered by Byng not to fire until the Spaniards repeated their firing. Oxford fell upon the 64-gun Santa Rosa and took her after a murderous cannonade, supported by other British ships in the distance. The 60-gun San Carlos struck her colours to Captain Thomas Matthews' Kent, having made little resistance. Captain Nicholas Haddock's Grafton, meanwhile, confronted Príncipe de Asturias together with Breda and Captain. Príncipe de Asturias was left almost shattered by Grafton and had most of her crew killed or injured, including Chacón, who was wounded in the face by splinters. The ship struck her colours to Breda and Captain while Grafton moved to engage another Spanish ship of sixty guns on his starboard.

At 1 pm, Gaztañeta's flagship, the 74-gun San Felipe, was attacked by Kent and soon after by Superb, from which she received two broadsides. A running fight took place for two hours between San Felipe, supported by three Spanish ships, and Byng's division of seven ships of the line and a fireship. Gaztañeta held off his pursuers until Kent, bearing down under his stern, fired a broadside and fell to the leeward while Superb fell simultaneously on his weather-quarter. San Felipe, which could only return fire with her after guns, was left dismasted and had its hull severely mauled, but Gaztañeta was unwilling to surrender. Byng's Barfleur came close to San Felipe, and Byng demanded that Gaztañeta strike his colours or Byng would dispatch one of his fireships against San Felipe. Gaztañeta refused and responded with a broadside. The British fired back and he received a shot which pierced his left leg and wounded his right heel. Volante, commanded by Captain Antonio Escudero, attempted to relieve San Felipe, staying close to her with the aim to attract some of the British fire upon herself. Pierced by the fire of three British ships, she struck to Montague and Rupert at nightfall. San Felipe, having 200 men out of action, amongst them flag captain Pedro Dexpois, who had been hit by the shattered bones of a sailor cut in half by a cannonball, also surrendered. Of the remaining ships of Gaztañeta's squadron, Juno meanwhile had been taken by Essex after a three-hour fight.

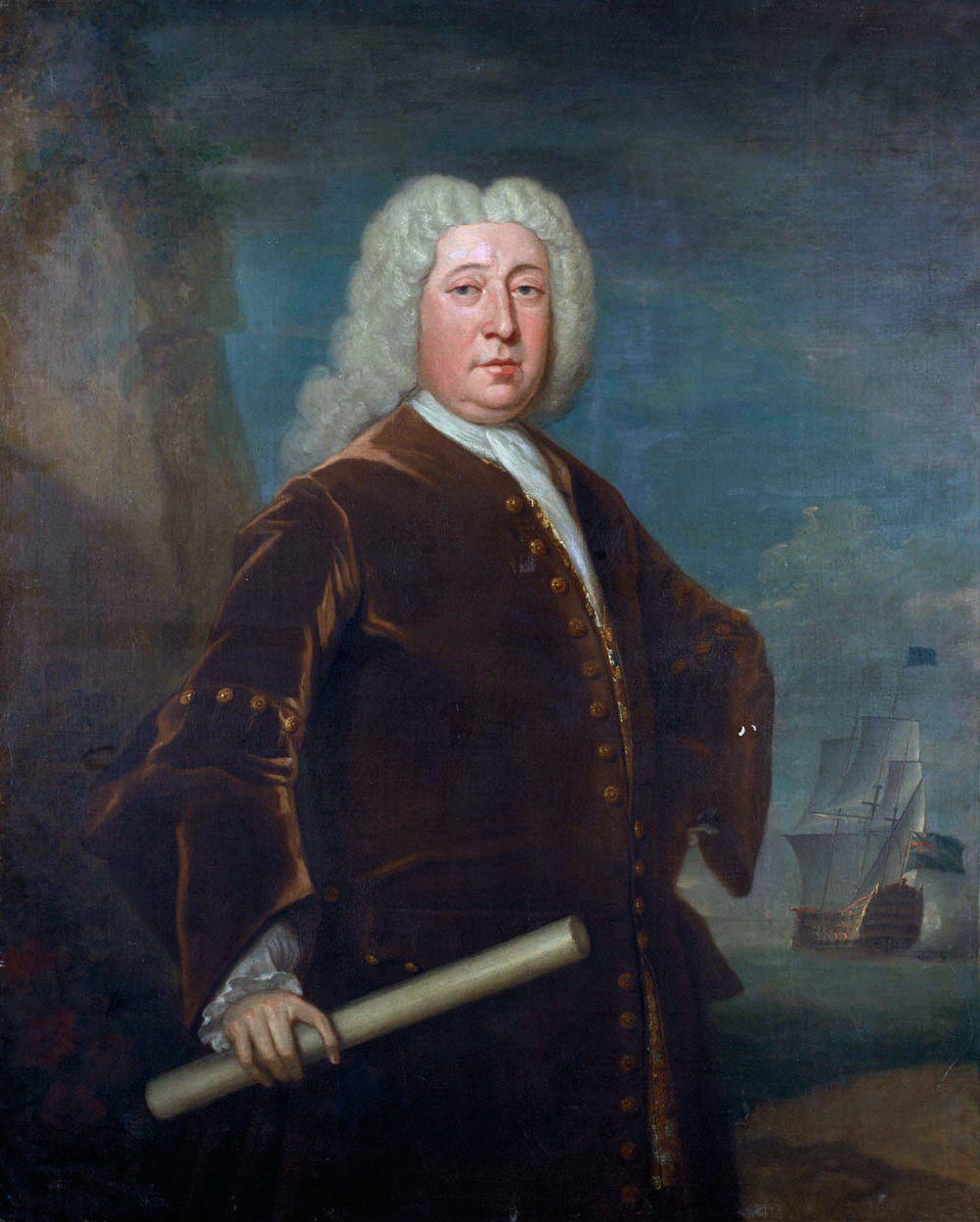
Portrait of Sir George Walton, by Bartholomew Dandridge

=== Guevara's arrival and retreat ===
In almost total darkness, Gaztañeta's San Felipe struck her colours. De Guevara, with San Luis and another ship of line, came in sight of the Spanish flagship, which had been alerted by the gunfire. Guevara's two ships bore down windward of them and exchanged a broadside with Byng's Barfleur. Told that San Felipe had surrendered, Guevara charged upon the wind and committed himself to collect the few Spanish ships still fighting on. The ship of the line Perla de España under Captain Gabriel de Alderete, was relieved and allowed to escape from the three British ships. Together with the frigate San Juan Menor, she left the battle, and headed towards Malta. Byng pursued them for some time, but given the fading light and low wind, he decided to stay with his fleet. Camocke, convinced of the defeat, set sail to the Venetian island of Corfu with his flagship San Fernando and a frigate.

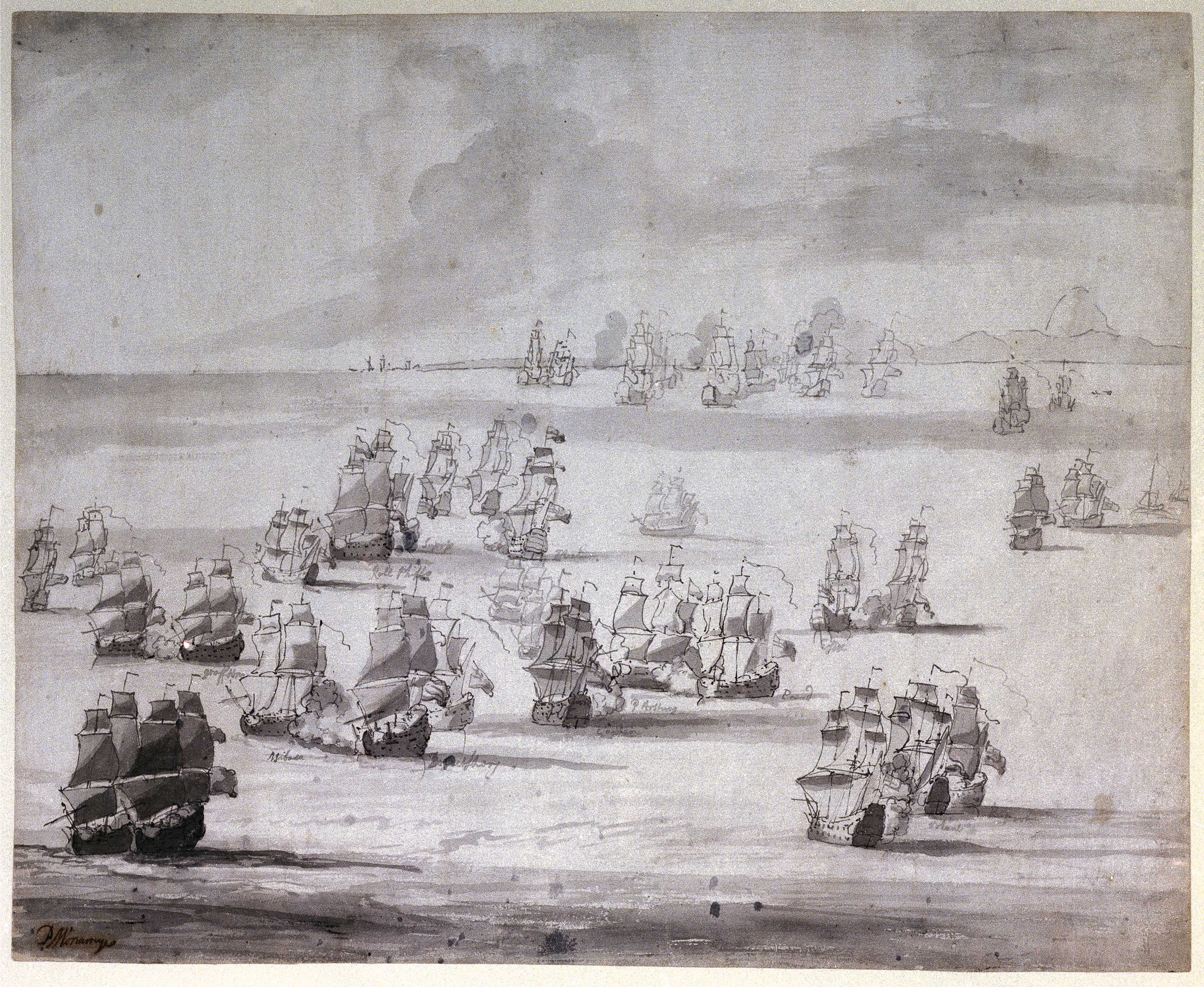
An aerial view of the battle by Peter Monamy

Francisco Grimau's galleys, taking advantage of favourable winds, escaped to Palermo. The Spanish ships which managed to escape were, besides the seven galleys, five ships of the line and six frigates. The 64-gun Santa Isabel, under Captain Andrés Reggio, was pursued all through the night and surrendered the next morning to Rear-Admiral of the Blue George Delaval. The British, in contrast, sustained trifling damage with no more than 500 killed or wounded all told. Of Byng's fleet, the ship which suffered the most damage was Grafton; but she had engaged and disabled several Spanish vessels. The necessary repairs of the Royal Navy ships, mostly in the rigging, and those relating to prizes taken, were done over the following days. On 18 August Byng received a letter from Captain Walton:

Sir, We have taken and destroyed all the Spanish ships and vessels which were upon the coast, the number as per margin.

— Captain George Walton, Canterbury, off Syracuse, August 16, 1718.

=== End of the battle ===
Walton had succeeded in capturing, by his own account, four warships, a bomb vessel and storeship in addition to burning four other warships. Having repaired his damaged ships, Byng entered the port of Syracuse, then held by Savoyard troops under the Count of Maffei and blockaded by the Spanish army. From there, Byng sent nine Spanish prizes, five ships of the line and four frigates, to Port Mahon under heavy escort. One of the prizes, San Felipe, was set on fire accidentally and blew up, killing most of the men onboard: 50 Spanish prisoners and 160 members of the British prize crew. According to Spanish accounts, shortly after the battle, a captain of the British fleet made a complaint to the Marquis of Lede in the name of Byng, stating that the Spaniards had fired first. Gaztañeta and his officers were dispatched to Augusta in a felucca, having taken an oath not to take up arms against the Habsburg armies for four months. Of the haul of Spanish prisoners taken – 2,600 who were wounded or sick, were also freed. Of the Spanish ships which escaped to Malta, where the Sicilian galleys under the Marquis of Rivaroles were still anchored. The Grand Master of the Knights Hospitaller, the Catalan Ramon Perellos y Roccaful, was a sympathiser of the House of Habsburg and refused entry to the Spanish.

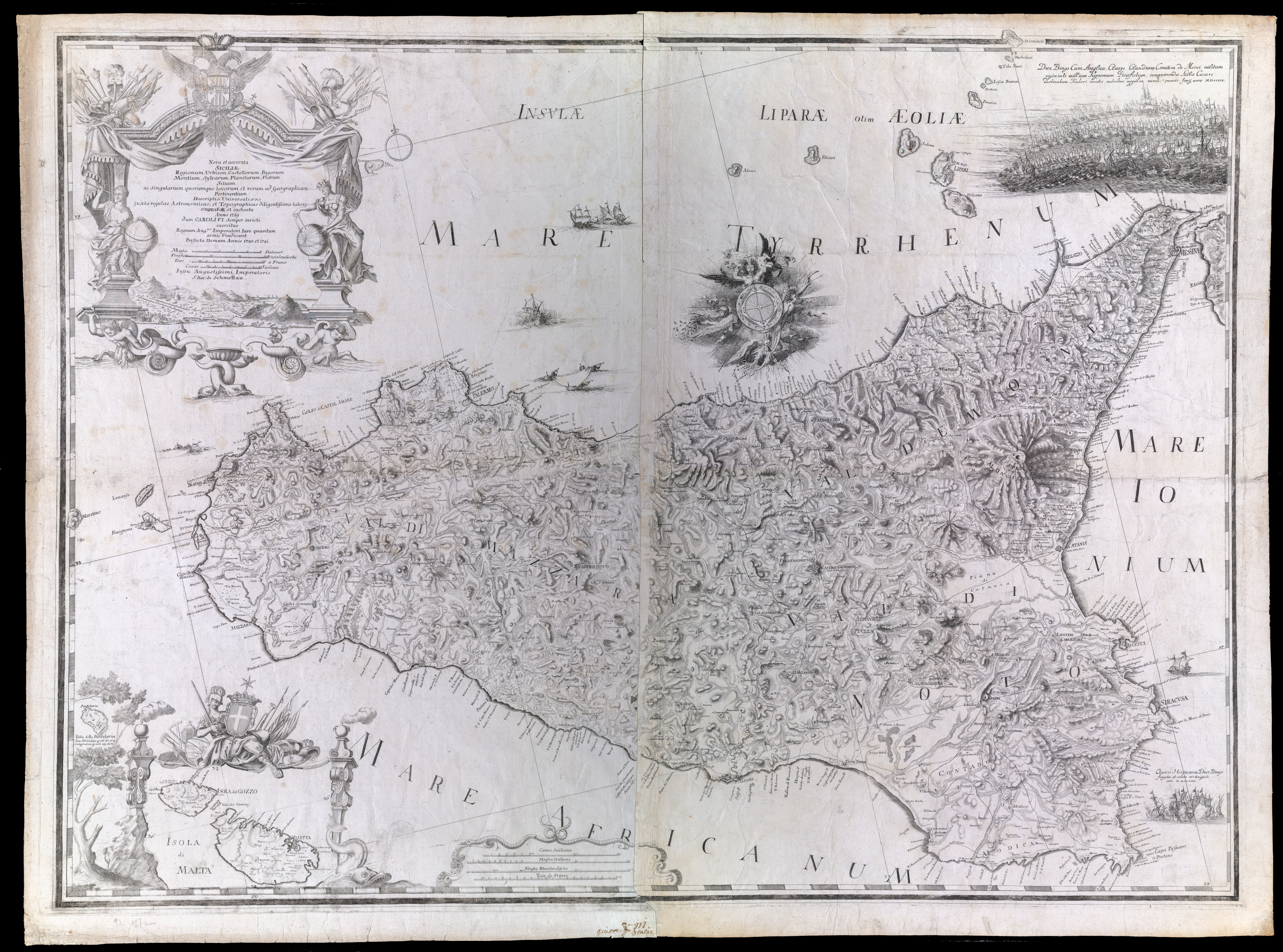
Map of Sicily showing vignettes of the British fleet commanded by Admiral John Byng in the Battle of Capo Passero (1718), and landing at Tindari (1719).

== Aftermath ==
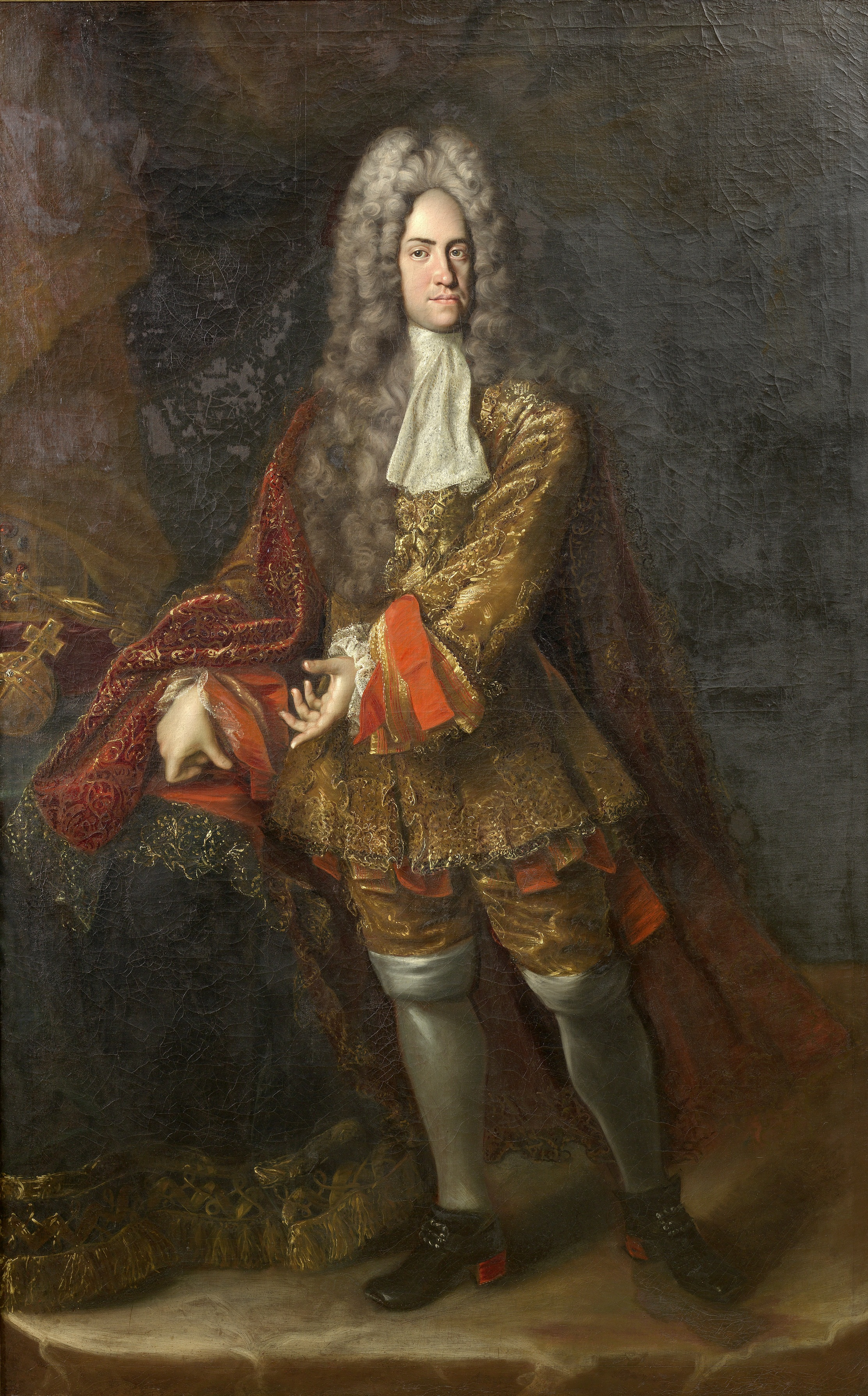
Charles VI, Holy Roman Emperor, in 1716. Portrait by Jan Kupecký. Byng's victory over the Spanish fleet ensured him the Sicilian throne.

Having achieved his goal of destroying or capturing the bulk of Spanish fleet, Byng then anchored at Malta. He was resolved to commit all his efforts to lift the Siege of Messina but to his surprise, even though German reinforcements broke through to the citadel, the Marquis d'Andorno surrendered on 29 September. The Marquis of Lede then held all of Sicily except the towns of Syracuse, Melazzo, and Trapani, held by considerable Savoyard garrisons for the following months. Byng detached four of his ships to eliminate Camocke's surviving ships and blockade the Spanish army. In the harbour of Augusta, the British attacked a convoy of small vessels and forced the Spaniards to scuttle a bomb vessel and fireship. Off Palermo, Grafton captured two Genoese vessels which had sailed from Porto Longone with a corps of Swiss mercenaries, munitions, and gunpowder. A third vessel ran aground when approached by Lennox near Castellammare del Golfo and was set on fire, though its crew managed to land 240 men, 700 flintlocks and some gunpowder.

As Byng's attack had virtually destroyed the Spanish fleet at Cape Passaro, the Spanish situation at Sicily considerably worsened over the months following the battle. Their army was isolated on the island, so the War Ministry informed Lede that they couldn't send troops or supplies. The blow was felt so severe by Alberoni that he banned the circulation of any information on the expedition and took measures against Great Britain, although he did not immediately declare war. He requested that ambassador Monteleone was to leave London and gave orders to issue letters of marque to privateers and to seize all British vessels and goods in the ports of Spain. This was a task in which de Guevera played a major role when he entered the port of Cádiz with his few surviving ships. In the meantime, Byng sent his eldest son to England with a full account of the battle. When he was at Naples in November, he received a letter written personally by Emperor Charles VI:

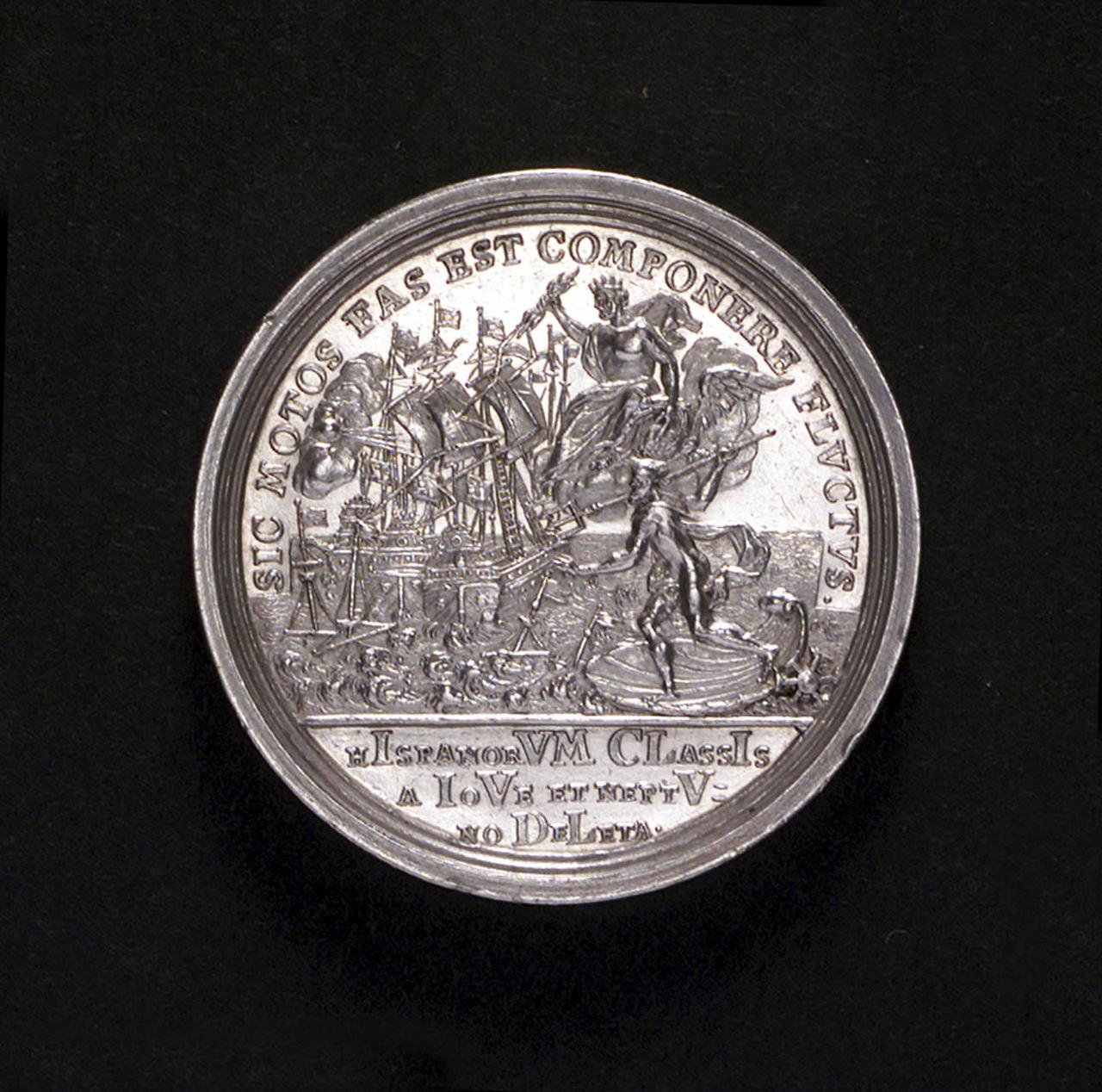
Medal commemorating the Battle made in 1718 – The Spanish fleet destroyed by Jupiter and Neptune The gods are symbolic of the Emperor (Charles VI) and the King (George I)

Admiral Sir George Byng,
I have received with a great deal of joy and satisfaction, by the bearer of this, yours of the 18th of August. As soon as I knew you was named by the king your master to command his fleet in the Mediterranean, I conceived the greatest hopes imaginable from that very circumstance. The glorious success yon have had surpasses, however, my expectations. You have given, upon this occasion, very singular proofs of your courage, conduct, and seal for the common cause: the glory you obtain from thence it indeed great, and yet my gratitude falls nothing short thereof, as Count Hamilton will fully inform you. You may always depend upon the continuance of my thankfulness and affection towards you: may God have yon always in his holy keeping.

— Charles VI, Holy Roman Emperor, Vienna, October 22, 1718.

On 26 December Great Britain declared war on Spain, France did the same soon after on 9 January the following year. In spite of the unfavourable turn of events, Alberoni was even more unwilling than at first to accept the terms dictated by the Quadruple alliance. To reverse the course of the war, Alberoni began to collect armaments and shipping at Cádiz and Corunna for an expedition to Britain itself. He sought alliance with King Charles XII of Sweden, he obtained the support of the Jacobite pretender, James Francis Edward Stuart. His plan was an invasion of the western England by 5,000 men under British turncoat James Butler, 2nd Duke of Ormonde. To deter Swedish involvement, Britain dispatched a squadron of ten ships of the line led by John Norris to the Baltic. The Swedish ships remained at their ports, and no naval action took place. Moreover, on 11 December Charles XII was killed by a cannonball at the Siege of Fredriksten, and Spain was deprived of its only potential ally. Alberoni decided to continue the project and entrusted the command of the fleet destined to England to de Guevara. Off Cape Finisterre the expedition was dispersed in a long and violent storm which sank several ships and scattered the fleet. Three frigates and five transports with troops reached Scotland and disembarked about 400 men, but they were soon defeated at the Battle of Glenshiel.

== Order of battle ==
=== British fleet ===
==== Van ====
- Shrewsbury (80) – Commanded by Vice-Admiral of the Blue Charles Cornwall and his flag captain Captain John Balchen)
- Burford (70) – Commanded by Captain Charles Vanbrugh
- Essex (70) – Commanded by Captain Richard Rowzier
- Canterbury (60) – Commanded by Captain George Walton
- Dreadnought (60) – Commanded by Captain William Haddock
- Rippon (60) – Commanded by Captain Christopher O'Brien
- Argyll (50) – Commanded by Captain Conningsby Norbury

==== Centre ====
- Barfleur (90) – Commanded by Admiral of the Fleet Sir George Byng and his flag captains Captain George Saunders and Captain Richard Lestock
- Breda (70) – Commanded by Captain Barrow Harris
- Grafton (70) – Commanded by Captain Nicholas Haddock
- Lenox (70) – Commanded by Captain Charles Strickland
- Orford (70) – Commanded by Captain Edward Falkingham
- Rupert (60) – Commanded by Captain Arthur Field
- Superb (60) – Commanded by Captain Streynsham Master

==== Rear ====
- Dorsetshire (80) – Commanded by Rear-Admiral of the Blue George Delaval and his flag captain Captain John Furzer
- Captain (70) – Commanded by Captain Archibald Hamilton
- Kent (70) – Commanded by Captain Thomas Mathews
- Royal Oak (70) – Commanded by Captain Thomas Kempthorne
- Dunkirk (60) – Commanded by Captain Francis Drake
- Montague (60) – Commanded by Captain Thomas Beverley
- Rochester (50) – Commanded by Captain Joseph Winder
- Charles Galley (44) – Commanded by Captain Philip Vanbrugh

==== Fireships ====
- Garland (32) – Commanded by Master and Commander Samuel Atkins
- Griffin (8) – Commanded by Captain Humphrey Orme

==== Bomb vessels ====
- Basilisk (6) – Commanded by Master and Commander John Hubbard
- Blast (6) – Commanded by Master and Commander James Luck

==== Storeships and hospital ships ====
- Success (24) – Commanded by Captain Francis Knighton
- Looe (42) – Commanded by Master and Commander Timothy Splaine

=== Spanish fleet ===
==== Ships of the line ====
- Real San Felipe/San Felipe El Real (80) – Commanded by Lieutenant-general José Antonio de Gaztañeta and his flag captain Ship-of-the-line Captain Pedro Despois; captured by Superbe and Kent and blew up after being towed to Port Mahon
- Príncipe de Asturias (70/72) – Commanded by Squadron Commander Francisco Chacón †; captured by Breda and Captain
- Nuestra Señora de las Viñas de la Santa Rosa (60/64) – Commanded by Frigate Captain Antonio González; captured by Orford
- Real Mari/El Real (62/64) Commanded by Squadron Commander Esteban de Mari y Centurión; captured by Breda and Captain
- San Luís (60) – Commanded by Squadron Commander Baltasar Vélez de Guevara; escaped to Malta
- San Fernando (60) – Commanded by Squadron Commander George Camocke; escaped to Malta
- San Juan Bautista (60) – Commanded by Ship-of-the-line Captain Francisco Guerrero; escaped to Malta.
- San Pedro (60) – Commanded by Ship-of-the-line Captain Antonio de Arizaga; escaped to Malta
- San Carlos (60) – Commanded by Ship-of-the-line Captain Jean II de Talleyrand-Périgord; captured by Kent
- Santa Isabel (60) – Commanded by Ship-of-the-line Captain Andrés Reggio; captured by Dorsetshire
- San Isidro (60) – Commanded by Frigate Captain Manuel de Villavicencio; captured by Canterbury's division
- Hermione (50) – Commanded by Frigate Captain Rodrigo de Torres; escaped before being burnt at Messina

==== Frigates ====
- Burlandín (50) – Commanded by unknown commander; escaped
- Tigre (50) – Commanded by Frigate Captain Cavaigne; captured
- Perla de España (44) – Commanded by Frigate Captain Gabriel de Alderete; escaped to Malta
- Puerco Epsín (44/50) – Commanded by Ship-of-the-line Captain de la Lande; escaped to Malta
- Sorpresa (40) – Commanded by Frigate Captain Miguel de Sada y Antillón; captured by Canterbury's division
- Pingue Pintado (40) – Commanded by Frigate Captain Gabriel Díaz; escaped
- Galera Victoria (40) – Commanded by Frigate Captain Francisco Álvarez Barreiro; escaped
- Volante (40) – Commanded by Frigate Captain Antonio Escudero; captured by Montagu and Rupert
- Águila de Nantes (36) – Commanded by Frigate Captain Lucas Masnata; captured by Canterbury's division
- Juno (36) – Commanded by Frigate Captain Pedro Moyano; captured by Essex
- San Felipe/Castilla (30) – Commanded by Frigate Captain Francisco de Liaño y Arjona; escaped
- La Tolosa (30) – Commanded by Frigate Captain José de Goicoechea; escaped before being captured at Messina
- Esperanza (28) – Commanded by Frigate Captain Juan María Delfin; burnt to avoid capture
- San Fernando el Chico (22) – Commanded by Frigate Captain Francisco Fort; escaped
- San Juanico/ San Juan el Chico (22) – Commanded by Frigate Captain Pedro Bataville; escaped
- San Francisco (22) – Commanded by Frigate Captain Alejandro Wanchop; escaped
- León (20) – Commanded by Frigate Captain Antonio Casamara; escaped
- Flecha (18) – Commanded by Frigate Captain José Papachino; escaped

==== Galleys ====
- Capitana (5) – Commanded by Squadron Commander Francisco Grimau and his flag captain Captain Francisco Olivares; escaped
- Patrona (5) – Commanded by Squadron Commander Pedro Montemayor and his flag captain Captain Martín Manrique; escaped
- Santa Teresa (5) – Commanded by Captain Tomás Villanueva; escaped
- San Genero (5) – Commanded by Captain Jerónimo Cerezuela; escaped
- San Felipe (5) – Commanded by Captain Nicolás Espluga; escaped
- San Fernando (5) – Commanded by Captain Antonio Carballo; escaped
- Soledad (5) – Commanded by Captain Donato Domás; escaped

==== Sloops ====
- Santo Domingo
- San Francisco

==== Fireships ====
- Castilla
- León

== See also ==
- Kingdom of Sicily under Savoy
