= Philip Vanbrugh =

British naval officer

Captain Philip Vanbrugh
- Born: c. 1681
- Died: 22 July 1753
- Relatives: John Vanbrugh (brother); Charles Vanbrugh (brother)
- Military career
- Allegiance: Kingdom of Great Britain
- Branch: Royal Navy
- Rank: Captain
- Commands: HMS Speedwell; HMS Charles Galley; HMS Breda; HMS York; HMS Burford; HMS Chatham
- Conflicts: War of the Quadruple Alliance; Battle of Cape Passaro; Anglo-Spanish War; Blockade of Porto Bello

Viceregal styles of Philip Vanbrugh
- Reference style: His Excellency
- Spoken style: Your Excellency

Philip Vanbrugh (c. 1681 – 22 July 1753) was an officer of the Royal Navy. He served as Commodore Governor of Newfoundland.

== Family ==
Vanbrugh was born in Chester and baptised there on 31 January 1682. He was the youngest child of Giles Vanbrugh, a London cloth merchant and later a sugar merchant in Chester, and his wife Elizabeth, née Carleton, herself youngest child of Sir Dudley Carleton and Lucy, née Croft. Vanbrugh's brothers included Captain Charles Vanbrugh RN MP and Sir John Vanbrugh, architect and dramatist.

Philip Vanbrugh married Mary Griffith in Arnold, Nottinghamshire on 24 July 1715 and they had one known child, Philippia, born 1716, la belle consulesse, who married Burrington Goldsworthy of Down House, Dorset, British consul at Leghorn, Italy and later at Cádiz. Their son, Lieutenant-General Philip Goldsworthy, became a favoured equerry to King George III and from 1772 his unmarried sister, Martha Caroline was sub-governess, under Lady Charlotte Finch, of the 15 royal children.

== Career ==
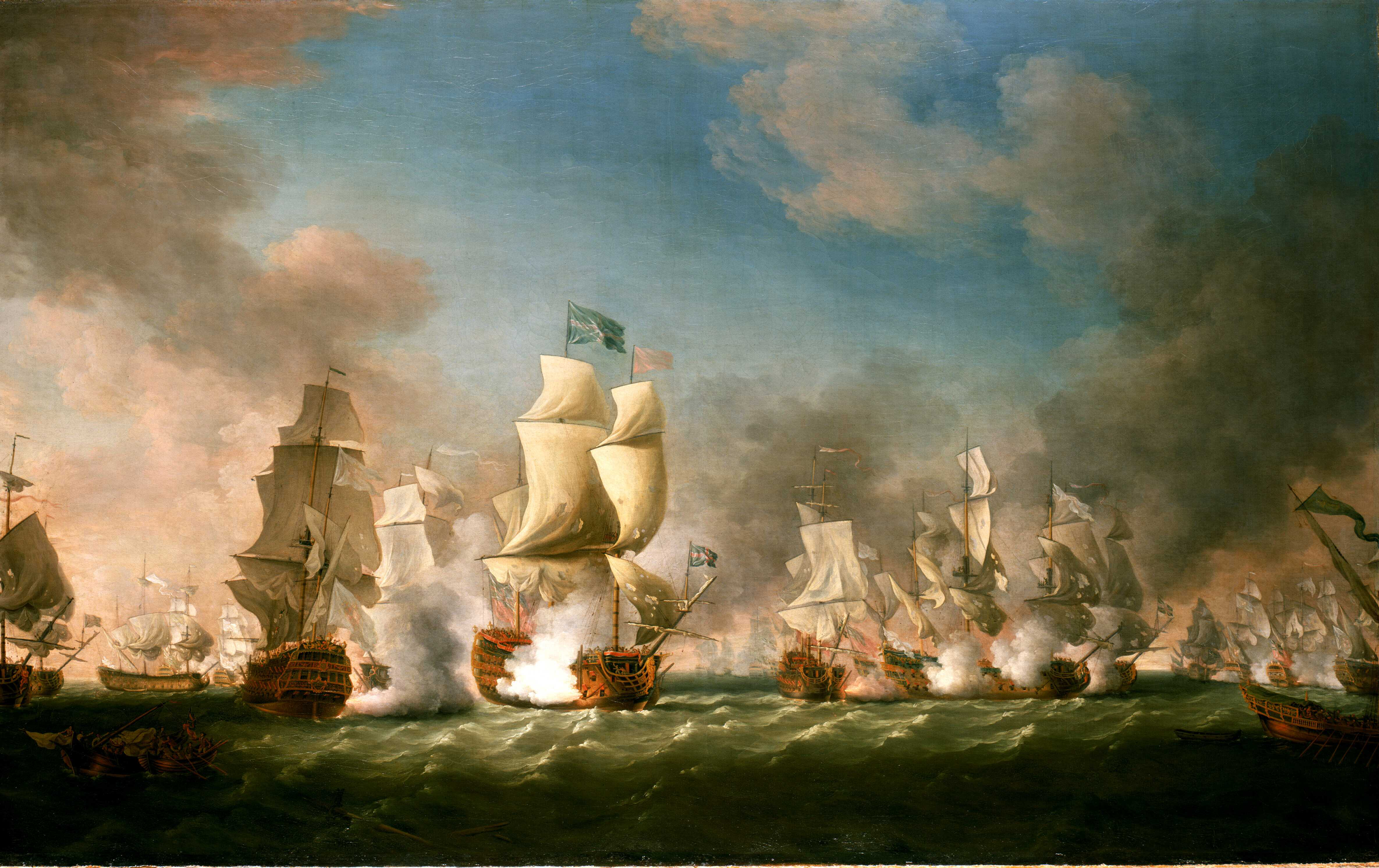
The Battle of Cape Passaro. Vanbrugh commanded a ship at the battle.

Philip Vanbrugh entered the navy, and after some years of service, was on 27 November 1710 appointed to command the 28-gun HMS Speedwell. In 1716 he was in command of the 32-gun HMS Charles Galley, and was sent to Gibraltar. He was still in command of her by 1718, when he served with the fleet under Admiral George Byng and was present at the Battle of Cape Passaro near Sicily on 11 August 1718. His elder brother Charles commanded HMS Burford during the battle. In 1721 Philip VanBrugh took command of HMS Breda, Vice-Admiral Francis Hosier's flagship at the disastrous Blockade of Porto Bello between 1726 and 1727. After months spent on the ineffective and costly operation, during which not a single British shot was fired, the British finally withdrew. 3,000 to 4,000 men had died from yellow fever and other tropical diseases, among them was Hosier, who died while the Breda was off Vera Cruz. Like many of the ships in that fleet Breda had suffered badly from worms attacking the hull, and she was broken up in 1730.

Vanbrugh survived the unhealthy posting, and in 1731 was given command of the 60-gun HMS York. He moved to take command of the 70-gun HMS Burford in 1734, and served in the fleet under Admiral Sir John Norris. Around 1736 he took command of the 50-gun HMS Chatham. On 14 June 1738 he was appointed governor of Newfoundland. During his brief term as governor, Vanbrugh recorded information about the nature of the fishery and tallied the inhabitants of Twillingate and Fogo. In 1739 Vanbrugh was appointed a Commissioner of the Navy, resident at Plymouth. He died in that office on 22 July 1753, aged about 71.

Political offices
Preceded by FitzRoy Henry Lee	Commodore Governor of Newfoundland; 1738–1738	Succeeded by Henry Medley
