= Vanbrugh (disambiguation) =

Vanbrugh may refer to:

- Irene Vanbrugh, English actress
- John Vanbrugh, English playwright and architect
- Philip VanBrugh, naval commander
- Violet Vanbrugh, English actress
- Vanbrugh College, York, a college of the University of York
- RTÉ Vanbrugh Quartet, a European string quartet
