= George Walton (Royal Navy officer) =

Royal Navy officer (1664/1665–1739)

Admiral of the Blue Sir George Walton
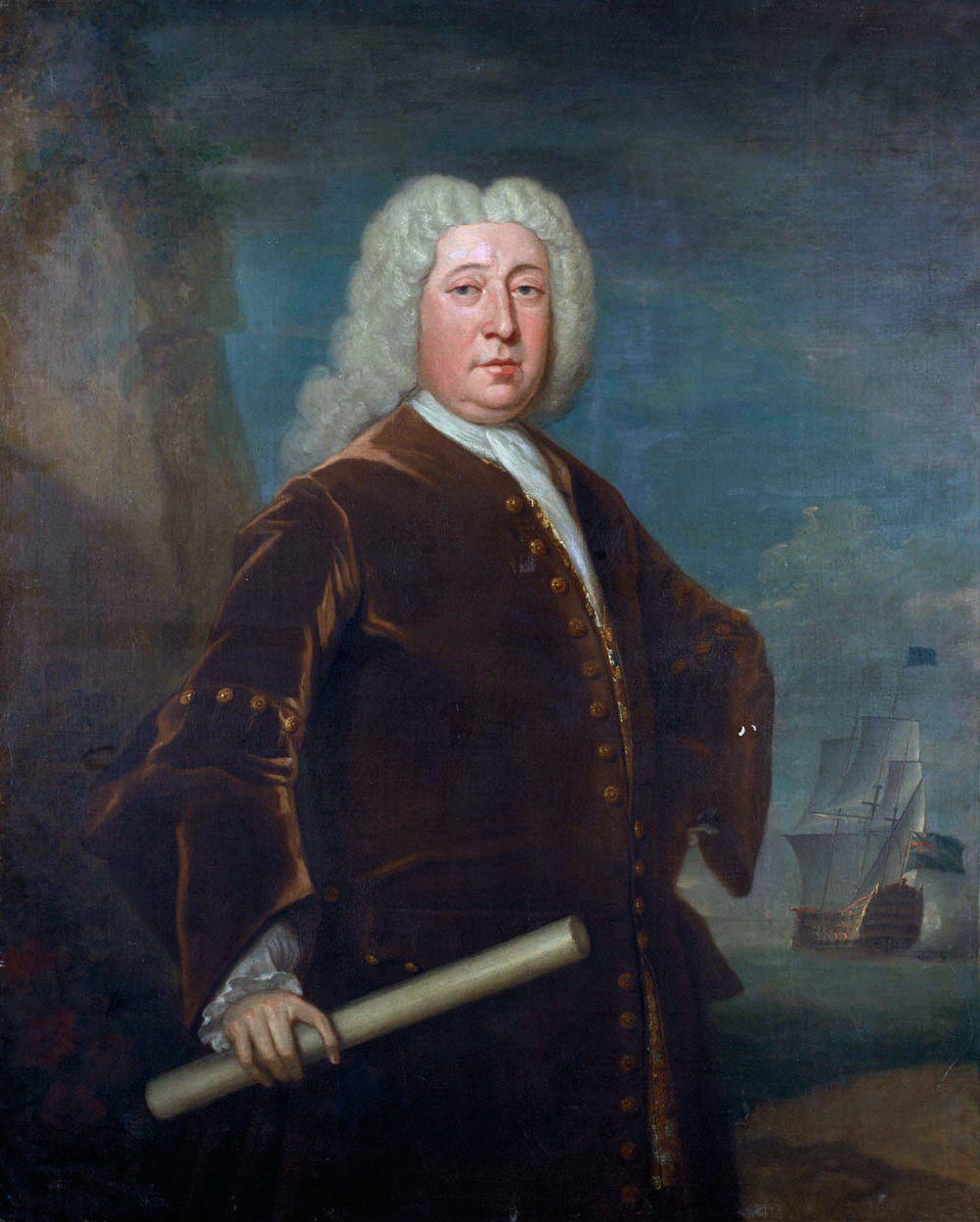
- Portrait by Bartholomew Dandridge, c. 1734–1739
- Born: 1664/1665; Little Burstead, Essex
- Died: 21 November 1739 (aged 74–75); England
- Military career
- Allegiance: England; Great Britain
- Branch: Royal Navy
- Service years: 1690–1736
- Rank: Admiral of the Blue
- Commands: HMS Seaford; HMS Seahorse; HMS Carcass; HMS Ruby; HMS Canterbury; HMS Montagu; HMS Defiance; HMS Nassau; HMS Cumberland; HMS Captain; HMS Princess Amelia; HMS Revenge; HMS Newark
- Conflicts: Nine Years' War; Battle of Beachy Head (1690); Battles of Barfleur and La Hogue; War of the Spanish Succession; Action of August 1702; War of the Quadruple Alliance; Battle of Cape Passaro
- Awards: Knighthood

Admiral of the Blue Sir George Walton (1664/1665 – 21 November 1739) was Royal Navy officer who served in the Nine Years' War, War of the Spanish Succession and War of the Quadruple Alliance.

== Family and early life ==
Much of the details of George Walton's early life are obscure, but it is known that he was born in the Essex village of Little Burstead in either 1664 or 1665. He entered the navy and was commissioned lieutenant on 22 February 1690. His first assignment was to HMS Anne, under Captain John Tyrell. Walton was present aboard Anne at the Anglo-Dutch defeat in the Battle of Beachy Head in May 1690, when the Anne was dismasted. Despite rigging up a jury jig, Anne was unable to escape and was deliberately run ashore west of Rye, where her crew abandoned and then burnt her to prevent her capture. Tyrell then received command of HMS Ossory, taking Walton with him, and the two saw action in the Battles of Barfleur and La Hogue in 1692.

== Promotion ==
Walton was appointed first lieutenant of HMS Devonshire in 1693 under Captain Henry Haughton. He spent most of this period serving in the English Channel until 1696, when he joined the main fleet aboard HMS Restoration under Captain Thomas Fowlis. Acquitting himself well, Walton was promoted to captain on 19 January 1697 and was given command of the 24-gun HMS Seaford. He was not in command long when on 5 May 1697, the Seaford was captured and burnt by the French off the Isles of Scilly. Walton returned to England and was given command of HMS Seahorse. He commanded her until 1699, in the North Sea and off the Dutch coast, followed by a period in the Mediterranean in 1699 under Vice-Admiral Matthew Aylmer.

== In the West Indies with Benbow ==
Walton was then appointed to command HMS Carcass for a ten-month period between 1701 and 1702, and sailed her to the West Indies. Here he joined a squadron under Vice-Admiral John Benbow, and in March 1702 Walton was appointed to command the 48-gun HMS Ruby. He then participated in the action of August 1702 under Benbow and against a French squadron under Admiral Jean-Baptiste du Casse. During the action, most of the English captains hung back from the engagement, and only Walton's conduct was considered above reproach. Walton kept the Ruby closely engaged, supporting Benbow aboard HMS Breda until Walton's ship was disabled by French fire. Ruby being unable to contribute further, Benbow ordered Walton to return to Port Royal, Jamaica.

Walton's next command was HMS Canterbury in June 1703, under the command of Vice-admiral John Graydon. Walton returned to England in October 1704, eventually spending six years and nine months aboard the Canterbury. He spent between 1705 and 1706 in the Mediterranean. He accompanied Sir Thomas Hardy in the escorting a convoy to Lisbon in 1707, and after gave evidence in favour of Hardy at the court-martial. Hardy had been criticised for not pursuing a French squadron that had been sighted during the voyage. Walton's next command was HMS Montagu in September 1710. He sailed with the fleet under Sir Hovenden Walker to attack Quebec City. During the voyage Walton and the Montagu captured two prizes. After the failure of the expedition, Walton returned to England and was appointed to act as commander-in-chief at Portsmouth in December 1712.

== Cape Passaro ==
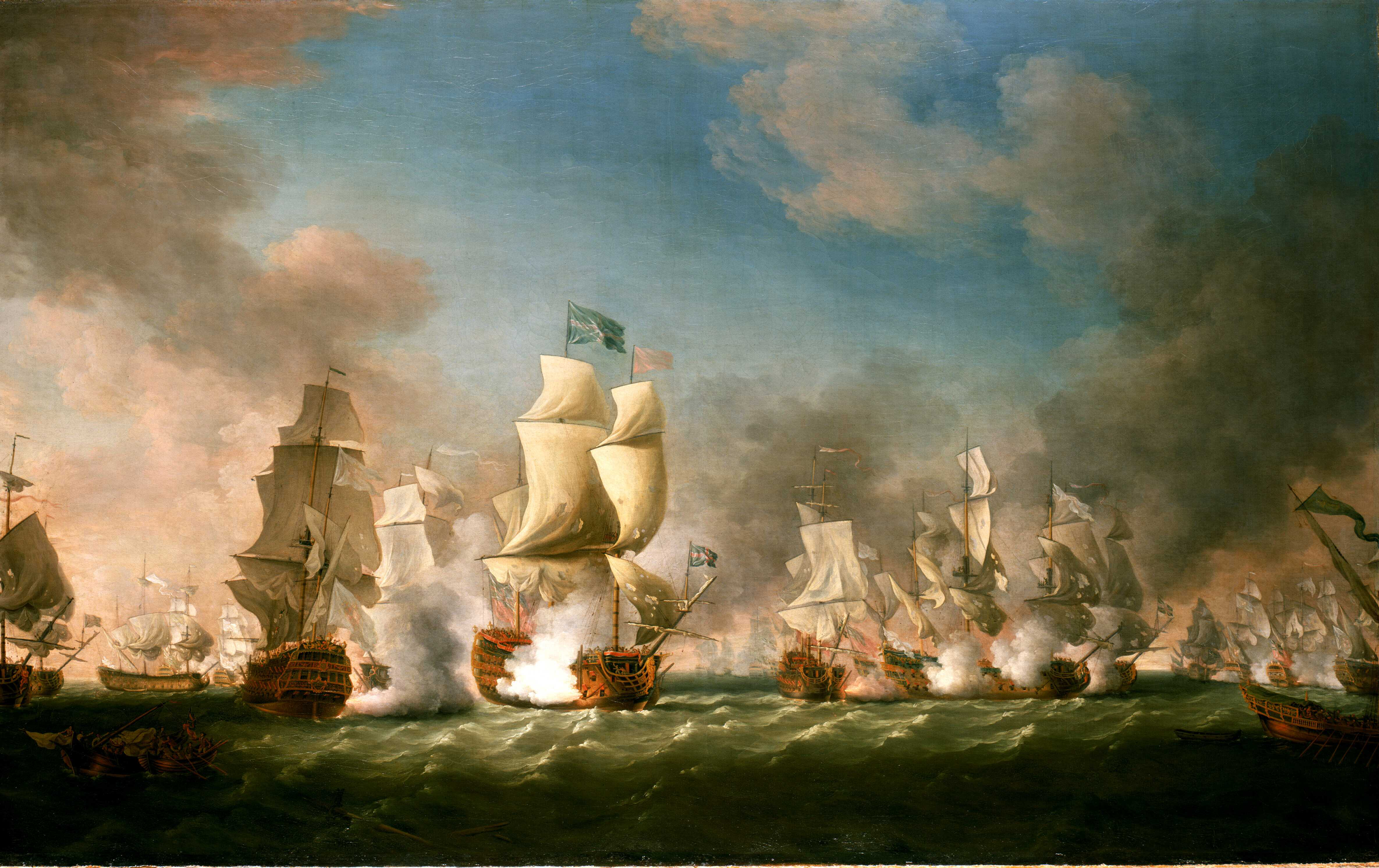
1767 painting of the Battle of Cape Passaro by Richard Paton

He returned to sea again when he was appointed to command HMS Defiance in early January 1718, followed by a return to his old ship, Canterbury. In the Canterbury he joined the fleet under George Byng and sailed for the Mediterranean. He had a large part in the Battle of Cape Passaro on 31 July 1718 and was given command of a detached five-ship squadron and sent to pursue a division of the Spanish fleet. Walton achieved a substantial victory with his small command, capturing six ships and destroying six more in the Strait of Messina. Modest in victory, he wrote to Byng on 5 August to inform him of his success, a letter described by The Gentleman's Magazine as 'remarkable for naval Eloquence'. It read

Sir, we have taken and destroyed all the Spanish ships which were upon the coast: the number as per margin.

== Knighthood and further promotions ==
Walton returned to England and in 1720 was appointed to HMS Nassau, then a guard ship at Sheerness. He was knighted on 15 January 1721 for his victory in 1718 and was promoted to Rear-Admiral of the Blue on 16 February 1723. He was appointed second in command of the Baltic fleet under Sir Charles Wager on 1726, and hoisted his flag in HMS Cumberland. He then served with Wager off Cádiz and Gibraltar in late 1726, returning to the Baltic aboard HMS Captain in April 1727 under the command of Admiral Sir John Norris. Walton was promoted to Rear-Admiral of the Red in December 1727, Vice-Admiral of the Blue in January 1727 (Old Style, 1728 New Style)), Vice-Admiral of the White in 1728 and was back with Wager in the Channel, followed by the Mediterranean in 1729, this time aboard HMS Princess Amelia. He continued his rise through the ranks, being appointed commander-in-chief at Spithead in 1731, and Vice-Admiral of the Red in January 1732. Promotion to Admiral of the Blue came next on 26 February 1734, and he spent 1734 to 1735 as commander-in-chief at the Nore, with HMS Revenge and then HMS Newark as his flagships.

== Retirement and final years ==
Walton retired in 1736, receiving a pension of £600 a year. He died three years later on 21 November 1739 aged 74 and unmarried. He was buried in the family's traditional resting place in the parish church of St Mary the Virgin in Little Burstead, Essex. He left £9,600 in his will to be divided amongst his relations.
