= HMS Grafton (1709) =

Ship of the line of the Royal Navy

- Grafton, plan of the 1725 rebuild

History

Great Britain
- Name: HMS Grafton
- Builder: Swallow and Fowler, Limehouse
- Launched: 9 August 1709
- Fate: Broken up, 1744
- Notes: Participated in: Battle of Cape Passaro

General characteristics as built
- Class & type: 1706 Establishment 70-gun third rate ship of the line
- Tons burthen: 1,095
- Length: 150 ft (45.7 m) (gundeck)
- Beam: 41 ft (12.5 m)
- Depth of hold: 17 ft 4 in (5.3 m)
- Propulsion: Sails
- Sail plan: Full-rigged ship
- Armament: 70 guns: Gundeck: 26 × 24-pdrs; Upper gundeck: 26 × 12-pdrs; Quarterdeck: 14 × 6-pdrs; Forecastle: 4 × 6-pdrs

General characteristics after 1722 rebuild
- Class & type: 1719 Establishment 70-gun third rate ship of the line
- Tons burthen: 1,133
- Length: 151 ft (46.0 m) (gundeck)
- Beam: 41 ft 6 in (12.6 m)
- Depth of hold: 17 ft 4 in (5.3 m)
- Propulsion: Sails
- Sail plan: Full-rigged ship
- Armament: 70 guns: Gundeck: 26 × 24-pdrs; Upper gundeck: 26 × 12-pdrs; Quarterdeck: 14 × 6-pdrs; Forecastle: 4 × 6-pdrs

HMS Grafton was a 70-gun third rate ship of the line of the Royal Navy. She was built by Swallow and Fowler, of Limehouse, London, to the dimensions of the 1706 Establishment, and was launched on 9 August 1709.

She spent some time under the command of George Forbes, 3rd Earl of Granard, and by 1718 she was commanded by Nicholas Haddock, and was present at the Battle of Cape Passaro. By 1738 she was stationed at the Nore, when she was commanded by Richard Lestock.

On 21 September 1722 Grafton was ordered to be taken to pieces and rebuilt to the 1719 Establishment at Woolwich, from where she was relaunched on 25 November 1725. She remained in service until 1744, when she was broken up.
