= HMS Seahorse (1709) =

Royal Navy sixth-rate ship

History

Great Britain
- Name: Seahorse
- Launched: 1709
- Fate: Wrecked in 1711

General characteristics
- Class & type: 14-gun sixth-rate
- Propulsion: Sails

HMS Seahorse was a 14-gun sixth-rate of the Royal Navy in service from 1709 to 1711, when it was wrecked in the River Dart.

== Description ==
Seahorse was a sixth-rate warship that carried fourteen 4-pounder guns on a single deck. The ship had a capacity of 161 tons burthen and measured 76 feet (23 m) long by 22.5 feet (6.9 m) wide. In 1710, it had a crew of 70 men.

== History ==
Construction of Seahorse was ordered on 16 May 1709, and the ship was "to launch next Spring". It was constructed by William Yeames at Limehouse Shipyard. The deadline was beaten, and Seahouse was launched later that year on 4 November 1709. It was acquired by the Royal Navy, and was commissioned in 1710 with Humphrey Blowers as its commanding officer. Seahorse remained with the fleet for the duration of 1710, and conducted operations in the English Channel in 1711.

On 29 November 1711, Seahorse was attempting to make its way further up the River Dart during a heavy storm. However, strong winds blew the ship onto rocks on the west side of the river, near Dartmouth Castle. The ship was beaten against the rocks and eventually wrecked and broke apart.
