= Shipbuilding in Limehouse =

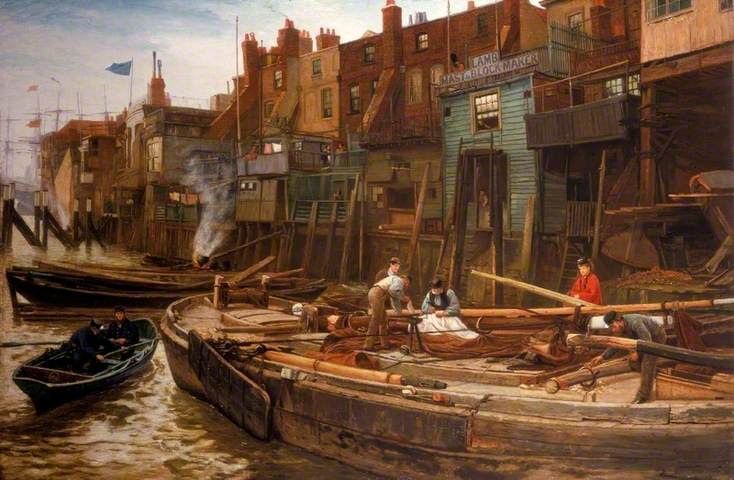
The premises of George and William Lamb, mastmakers of 92 Narrow Street, and Charles John Hartnoll, barge building in the foreground, mid-nineteenth century

Shipbuilding in Limehouse started in the fourteenth century. Limehouse is a district located on the northern bank of the River Thames 3.9 miles (6.3 km) east of Charing Cross in the East End of London. Its name arose from the lime kilns established here around the same time. It became a centre for shipbuilding and related trades such as ropemaking, with some entrepreneurs shifting the focus of their activity through their careers.

John Graves established his shipyard at Limekiln Dock in 1633 and then expanded his holdings with Dundee Wharf. By 1650 George Margetts developed a ropemaking yard including a ropehouse, storehouse and a ropewalk on land he leased from Graves.
