= HMS Seahorse (1694 fireship) =

Royal Navy fireship

History

England
- Name: Seahorse
- Acquired: 1694, by purchase
- Fate: Sunk as breakwater in 1698, raised and broken up 5 December 1871

General characteristics
- Class & type: 10-gun fireship
- Propulsion: Sails

HMS Seahorse was a 10-gun fireship of the Royal Navy in service from 1694 to 1698, when it was sunk as a breakwater. The ship was raised in 1871 and broken up for lumber.

== History ==
Seahorse was acquired by the Royal Navy in 1694, when they purchased it from the Dutch. It was first used as a fireship, and then was repurposed into a water boat to carry freshwater to larger warships. It was sunk as a breakwater at Chatham Dockyard, Kent, in 1698. The wreck of the ship was used as a part of the retaining wall at a depth of about 30 feet (9.1 m).

In 1871, the wreck of Seahorse was discovered while alterations to Chatham Dockyard were being made. It was subsequently excavated for its lumber, the best of which was sound enough for use at the dockyard with the rest being sold at an auction by the Admiralty.
