= HMS Basilisk (1695) =

History

England
- Name: HMS Basilisk
- Ordered: 9 January 1695
- Builder: William Redding, Wapping
- Launched: 4 May 1695
- Commissioned: 1695
- Out of service: 21 January 1729
- Fate: Broken up, Deptford Dockyard, 1729

General characteristics
- Class & type: 6-gun Serpent-class bomb vessel
- Tons burthen: 163 63/94 (bm)
- Length: 72 ft 2 in (22.0 m) (overall); 57 ft 4 in (17.5 m) (keel)
- Beam: 23 ft 2 in (7.1 m)
- Depth of hold: 10 ft 2 in (3.1 m)
- Propulsion: Sail
- Sail plan: Ketch-rigged
- Complement: 30
- Armament: 4 × 2-pdrs; 2 × 121/2 in. mortars

HMS Basilisk was a Serpent-class bomb vessel of the Royal Navy, one of ten such vessels commissioned in 1695 to support land assaults on continental ports. Initially commissioned as part of Admiral John Berkeley's fleet during the Nine Years' War, she also saw service as an exploratory vessel along the St Lawrence River, and later as part of the victorious British forces at the Battle of Cape Passaro.

At 163 tons burthen she was the largest vessel in her class and also the last survivor of it; all nine of her sister ships had been lost or broken up by the time she was decommissioned and broken up at Deptford Dockyard in 1729.

== Bibliography ==
- McLaughlan, Ian (2014). The Sloop of War, 1650-1763. Seaforth Publishing. ISBN 9781848321878.
- Winfield, Rif (2007). British Warships of the Age of Sail 1714–1792: Design, Construction, Careers and Fates. Seaforth. ISBN 9781844157006.
