= HMS Cumberland (1695) =

Ship of the line of the Royal Navy

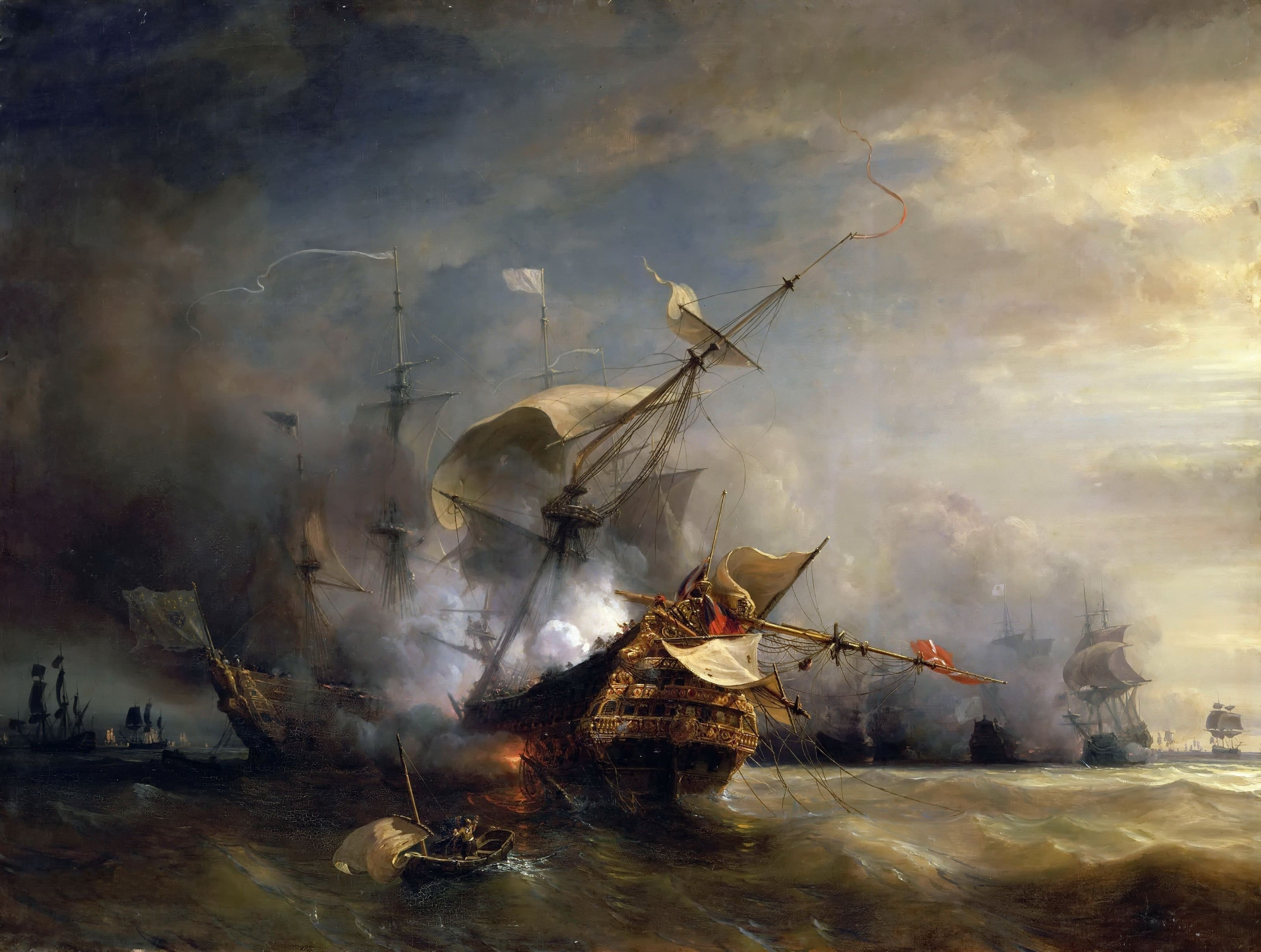
- Possible depiction of Cumberland at the Battle at The Lizard

History

Great Britain
- Name: HMS Cumberland
- Builder: Wyatt, Bursledon
- Launched: 12 November 1695
- Captured: by France in 1707

History

France
- Name: Cumberland
- Acquired: 21 October 1707
- Fate: Sold to Genoa in 1715

History

Genoa
- Name: Cumberland
- Acquired: 1715
- Fate: Sold to Spain in 1717

History

Spain
- Name: Principe de Asturias
- Acquired: 1717
- Captured: by Britain in 1718

History

Great Britain
- Acquired: 11 August 1718
- Out of service: 1718-20
- Fate: Sold to Austria in 1720

History

Austria
- Name: San Carlos
- Acquired: 1720
- Fate: Broken up in 1733

General characteristics
- Class & type: 80-gun third-rate ship of the line
- Tons burthen: 1220 bm
- Length: 156 ft (47.5 m) (gundeck)
- Beam: 42 ft (12.8 m)
- Depth of hold: 18 ft (5.5 m)
- Propulsion: Sails
- Sail plan: Full-rigged ship
- Armament: 80 guns of various weights of shot

HMS Cumberland was an 80-gun third-rate ship of the line of the Royal Navy, launched at Bursledon on 12 November 1695. Cumberland was captured by the French in the Battle at The Lizard in 1707. She served in the French navy under her old name, and in 1715 was sold to Genoa. The Genoese sold her to Spain in 1717 and she was renamed Principe de Asturias. She was recaptured by the British at the Battle of Cape Passaro in 1718, but did not return to service, and was instead sold to the Austrians in 1720. She was based at Naples and was renamed San Carlos. She served until being broken up in 1733, having by then served under five flags.
