= Bartholomew Dandridge (artist) =

English painter (1691–1755)

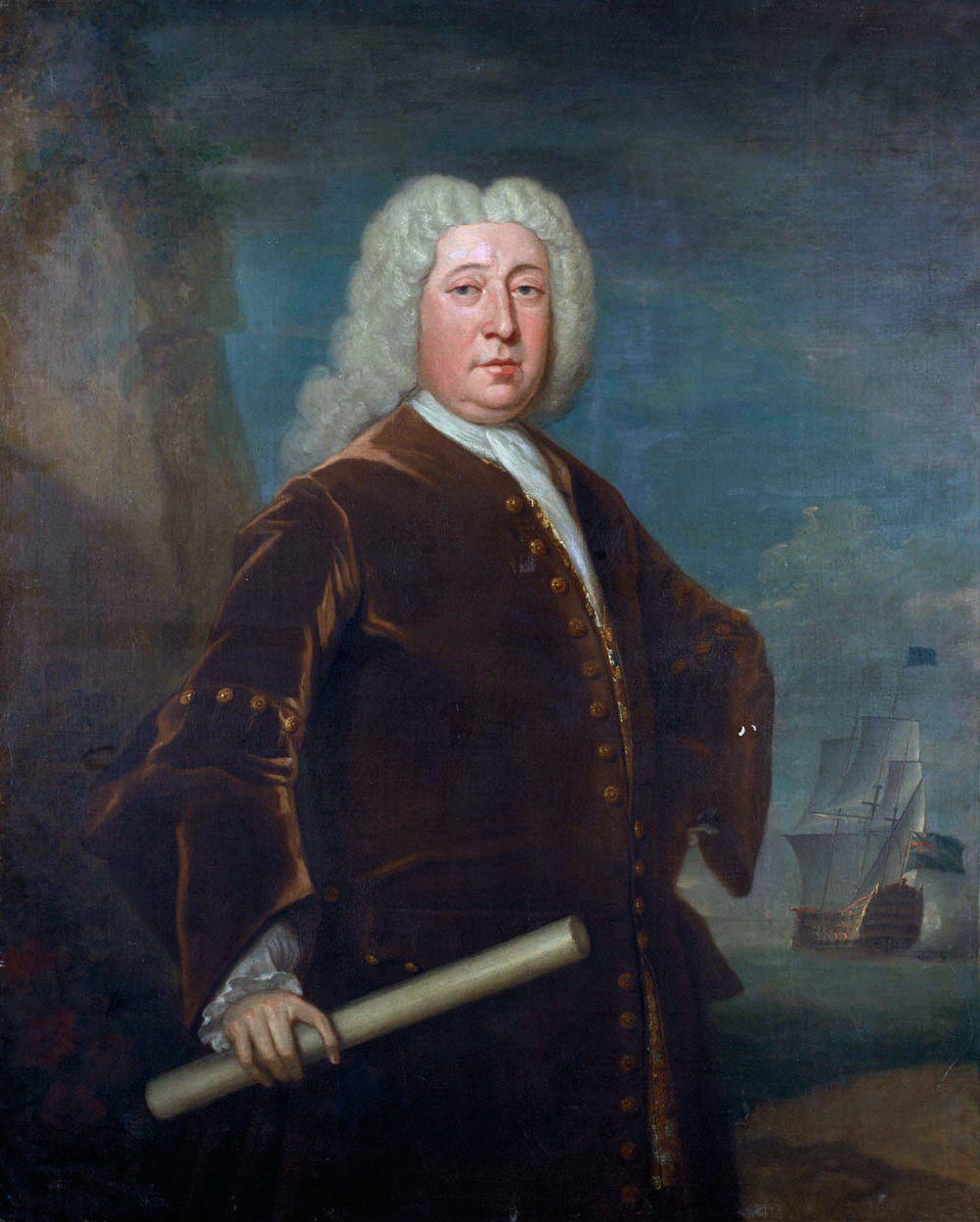
Portrait of George Walton by Dandridge, made between 1734 and 1739

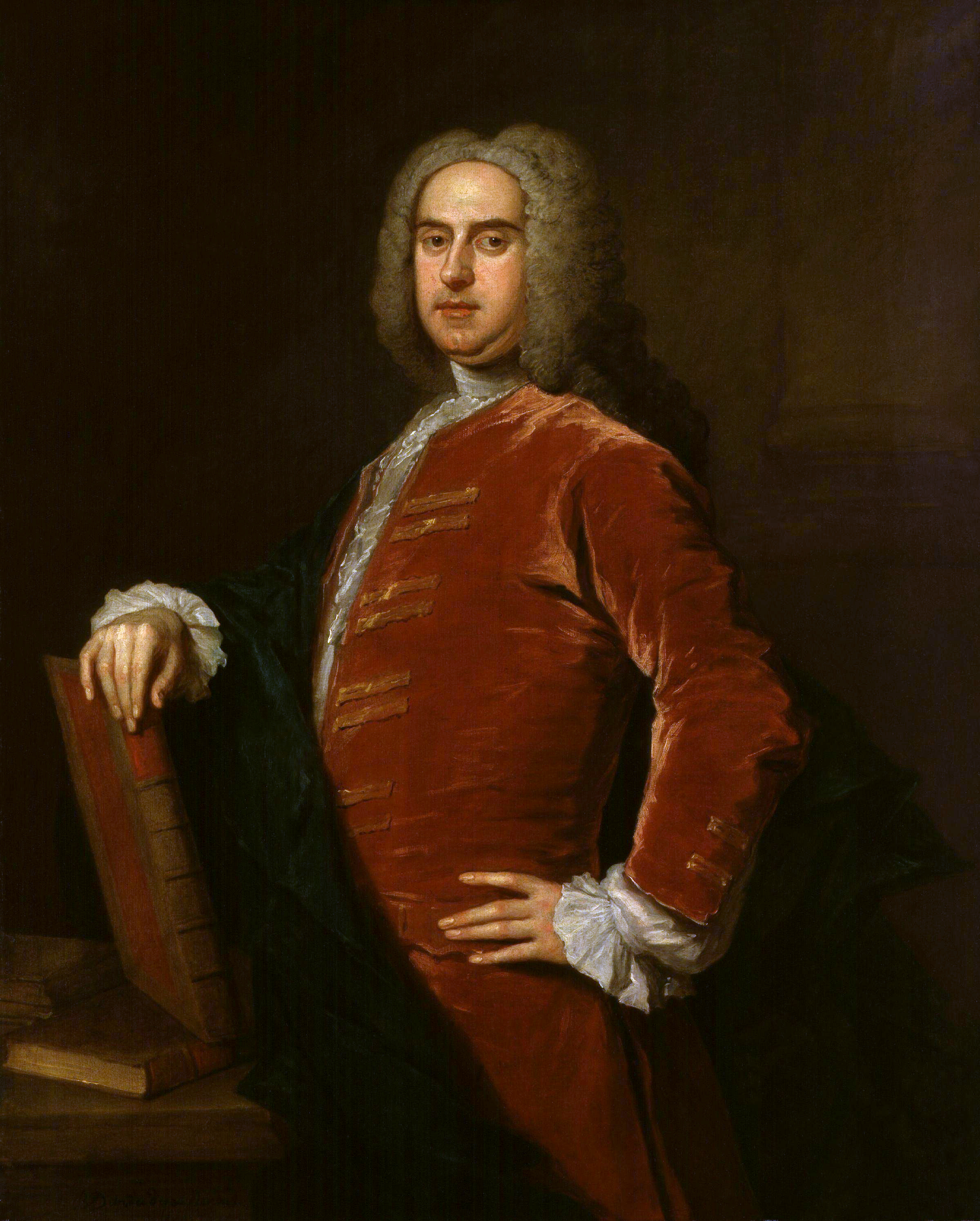
Portrait of Nathaniel Hooke by Dandridge

Bartholomew Dandridge (1691 – October 1755) was an English painter who specialised portrait painting.

== Life ==
According to Horace Walpole, Dandridge was the son of a house-painter. He studied at Sir Godfrey Kneller's academy of painting and later at the St Martin's Lane Academy. He had a career as a fashionable portrait painter in London for more than forty years, working in a style similar to that of John Vanderbank. In 1732, he was commissioned by Lord Barington to paint a portrait of Frederick, Prince of Wales on horseback, now in the collection of the National Portrait Gallery but on loan to Spencer House.

In 1733, he moved to 55, Great Queen Street, which had formed part of the house of Sir Godfrey Kneller until his death two years before. He played a part in the development of the conversation piece, making groups of model figures to judge effects of light and shade.

His portraits of the historian Nathaniel Hooke and an unknown subject (believed to be William Kent) are also in the collection of the National Portrait Gallery. The collection of the Fitzwilliam Museum includes a Portrait of a Painter by Dandridge; this may be the self-portrait he is recorded as having painted in 1729, although the identification of the subject is not certain.
