= HMS Blast (1695) =

History

England
- Name: HMS Blast
- Ordered: 9 January 1695
- Builder: Sir Henry Johnson, Blackwall Yard
- Launched: 1695
- Commissioned: 1695
- Out of service: 1724
- Fate: Broken up, Port Mahon

General characteristics
- Class & type: 6-gun Serpent-class bomb vessel
- Tons burthen: 143 14/94 (bm)
- Length: 66 ft 1 in (20.1 m) (overall); 50 ft 6 in (15.4 m) (keel)
- Beam: 23 ft 1 in (7.0 m)
- Depth of hold: 10 ft 0 in (3.0 m)
- Propulsion: Sail
- Sail plan: Ketch-rigged
- Complement: 30
- Armament: 4 × 2-pdrs; 2 × 12 1/2 in mortars

HMS Blast was a Serpent-class bomb vessel of the Royal Navy, one of ten such vessels commissioned in 1695 to support land assaults on continental ports. Over a 30-year period she saw service in the fleets of Admirals Berkeley and Byng and took part in the British victory at the Battle of Cape Passaro in 1718.

In 1721 she was converted to a storeship in British-controlled Port Mahón, and was broken up there in 1724.

== Bibliography ==
- Winfield, Rif (2007). British Warships of the Age of Sail 1714–1792: Design, Construction, Careers and Fates. Seaforth. ISBN 9781844157006.
