= George Camocke =

Anglo-Irish naval officer

- Born: c. 1666; Ireland
- Died: c. 1722; Ceuta, Spain or Rouen, France
- Military career
- Allegiance: England; Great Britain; Spain
- Branch: Royal Navy; Spanish Navy
- Service years: 1682-late 1710s
- Rank: Admiral of the Spanish Navy
- Commands: Lion; Owner's Goodwill; Bonetta; Monck
- Conflicts: Battle of Beachy Head (1690); Battle of Barfleur

Rear-Admiral George Camocke (c. 1666 – c. 1722) was an Anglo-Irish naval officer. Camocke was a Jacobite renegade who became an admiral for Spain. He served in the Royal Navy during the reigns of William III, Queen Anne and George I. Camocke was dismissed from the Royal Navy for disciplinary breaches. Camocke then joined the Spanish Navy. He died in exile after his favour had run out with the Spanish navy.

== Early life and rise ==
George Camocke was born in Ireland around 1666 to a family from Essex. He entered the navy in 1682. After serving eight years, Camocke safely brought a French privateer with twelve guns back to England and was promoted to lieutenant.

== Service to England ==
Camocke was made a commander of the Lion, a 60-gun ship, and fought with her at the Battle of Beachy Head (1690) and at the Battle of Barfleur (1692). He was later wounded while setting fire to a three-deck French ship at La Hogue and was promoted to first lieutenant of the Loyal Merchant soon after (1692–1693). The Loyal Merchant was part of the fleet that sailed to the Mediterranean with Sir George Rooke.

Camocke became the commander of the Owner's Goodwill fire ship in 1695 and a promotion to the brigantine Intelligence followed afterwards. With Camocke aboard his new vessel, Intelligence bombarded Calais. In December 1697, she was decommissioned and Camocke's circumstances became grim. He repeatedly appealed to the Admiralty for assistance which he they soon granted him. He was then appointed to a guard ship but was not content to be stationed on an uncommissioned ship. Camocke sought help from the Admiralty again.

On 11 September, Camocke was appointed commander of the sloop Bonetta. She sailed the North Sea and the northern coast of Ireland. In June 1702, Camocke was promoted in rank and took command of the frigate Speedwell that sailed along the coasts of Ireland. Over the next eight years, Camocke used the Speedwell successfully against the enemy's privateers. He became commander of the Monck (60 guns) in the spring of 1711 and once again captured troublesome privateers. In May 1712, Camocke wrote that he had been "used ill by the whigs". He claimed that he had a promise of a vice admiralship in the service of the Tsar of Muscovy. Camocke also suggested that the King should pardon the West Indies pirates who were in possession of several ships. Camocke wanted the Royal Navy sent to the Bahamas to force the reduction of trade between the West Indies and Guinea and had considered a 50-gun Cádiz ship for this task.

On orders from the Commander-in-Chief Sir John Jennings to sail to Port Mahon, Camocke embarked to Palermo, Italy, via the Mediterranean in February 1713. The order included instructions for Camocke to transport soldiers to Britain. He transported Spanish soldiers from Palermo to Alicante instead. He eventually took the English soldiers on board at Port Mahon before putting into Cádiz and Lisbon, Portugal. These actions were considered violations of his duty and were cited as the reason for his suspension. Camocke's explanation for his actions was considered unsatisfactory, and he was told that he was suspended until he could be cleared by a court-martial.

In a letter Camocke wrote in January 1714–15 to the secretary of the admiralty, he stated that the late Queen had approved of his actions and had given orders to call off Camocke's suspension. These statements served as a rejection of his court-martial offer and left the matter in the Admiralty's hands. Camocke had wanted to acquit himself by telling the lordship of all of the deeds that he did in his service to King George. However, he was struck off the list of captains soon after.

== Treason ==
Once again Camocke considered joining the Russian Navy but he instead became a rear admiral in the Spanish Navy three years later. Camocke held a junior command in the fleet that Sir George Byng destroyed near Cape Passaro on 31 July 1718. He escaped and returned to Messina. In mid-August, with respect to Camocke's rebellion, Byng wrote to Craggs and relayed the order that he had received—ignore Camocke when he came ashore. Camocke tried to engage Byng and offered him, in the name of King James, £100,000 and the title of Duke of Albemarle, if he would take the fleet to Messina or any Spanish port. Camocke later sent a similar letter to Captain Walton offering him a commission as an admiral of the blue and an English peerage.

While Messina was blockaded, several ships were captured trying to leave port. One of the ships, a small frigate sailed by Camocke, was captured in January 1718–19 by the Royal Oak but Camocke escaped. He was so scared that he left everything behind, including his treasonable papers. He made it to Catania.

During the Atterbury Plot, Camocke convinced the King of Sweden to send 12,000 Swedish troops to England as opposed to reimbursing a loan to Charles XII.

== Later life and death ==
Once back in Spain, he was banished to Ceuta and he died either there or in Rouen a few years later.
