= HMS Burford (1679) =

Ship of the line of the Royal Navy

History

Kingdom of England
- Name: HMS Burford
- Namesake: Charles Beauclerk, Earl of Burford
- Ordered: April 1677
- Builder: Phineas Pett (completed by Thomas Shish), Woolwich Dockyard
- Launched: November 1679
- Commissioned: 15 December 1679
- In service: 1679–1719
- Honours and awards: Barfleur 1692; Gibraltar 1704; Velez-Malaga 1704; Passaro 1718
- Fate: Wrecked, 14 February 1719

General characteristics as built
- Class & type: 70-gun third rate ship of the line
- Tons burthen: 1,05132/94 (bm)
- Length: 152 ft 4 in (46.43 m) gundeck; 121 ft 6 in (37.03 m) keel for tonnage
- Beam: 40 ft 4 in (12.29 m)
- Draught: 18 ft 0 in (5.49 m)
- Depth of hold: 17 ft 3 in (5.26 m)
- Propulsion: Sails
- Sail plan: Full-rigged ship
- Armament: 1677 Establishment 72/60 guns; 26 × demi-cannons 54 cwt – 9.5 ft (LD); 26 × 12-pdr guns 32 cwt – 9 ft (UD); 10 × sakers 16 cwt – 7 ft (QD); 4 × sakers 16 cwt – 7 ft (Fc); 5 × 5 3-pdr guns 5 cwt – 5 ft (RH)

General characteristics after 1699 rebuild
- Class & type: 70-gun third rate ship of the line
- Tons burthen: 1,11325/94 (bm)
- Length: 152 ft 4 in (46.4 m) (gun deck); 126 ft 2 in (38.5 m) (keel)
- Beam: 40 ft 8 3/4 in (12.4 m)
- Depth of hold: 16 ft 4 1/4 in (5.0 m)
- Propulsion: Sails
- Sail plan: Full-rigged ship
- Armament: 70 (war) 62 (peace) (by 1703 Gun Establishment); Lower deck: 24/22 × 24-pounder; Upper deck: 26/24 × 9-pounder; Quarterdeck: 12/10 × 6-pounder; Forecastle: 4/2 × 6-pounder; Roundhouse: 4 × 4-pounder

HMS Burford was a 70-gun third rate ship of the line built at Woolwich Dockyard in 1677/79 as part of the Thirty Ships Programme of 1677. She fought in the War of the English Succession, including the Battle of Barfleur, before being rebuilt at Deptford in 1699, remaining as a 70-gun third rate. During the War of Spanish Succession she was mostly in the Mediterranean fleet and fought at the capture of Gibraltar and the Battle of Málaga in 1704 before being extensively repaired between 1710 and 1712 at Portsmouth Dockyard. Burford served in the Baltic in 1715 and 1717 before returning to the Mediterranean to fight the Spanish at the Battle of Cape Passaro in 1718. She was wrecked on the Italian coast in a storm on 14 February 1719.

She was named in honour of Charles II illegitimate son, Charles Beauclerk, his son with Nell Gwynn. Charles Beauclerk was made the Earl of Burford in 1676 (and later also Duke of St Albans, resulting in a second ship being named after Beauclerk). This was the first vessel to bear the name Burford in the English and Royal Navy.

HMS Burford was awarded the Battle Honour Barfleur 1692, Gibraltar 1704, and Velez-Malaga 1704, Passaro 1718.

== Construction and specifications ==
She was ordered in April 1677 to be built at Woolwich Dockyard under the guidance of Master Shipwright Phineas Pett (until February 1678) and completed by Thomas Shish. She was launched in November 1679. Her dimensions were a gundeck of 152 feet 4 inches (46.43 metres) with a keel of 121 feet 6 inches (37.03 metres) for tonnage calculation with a breadth of 40 feet 4 inches (12.29 metres) and a depth of hold of 17 feet 3 inches (5.26 metres). Her builder's measure tonnage was calculated as 1,05132/94 tons (burthen). Her draught was 18 feet 0 inches (5.49 metres).

Her initial gun armament was in accordance with the 1677 Establishment with 72/60 guns consisting of twenty-six demi-cannons (54 cwt, (Note: "cwt", or "hundredweight" refers to the weight of the gun itself.) 9.5 ft) on the lower deck (LD), twenty-six 12-pounder guns (32 cwt, 9 ft) on the upper deck (UD), ten sakers (16 cwt, 7 ft) on the quarterdeck (QD), and four sakers (16 cwt, 7 ft) on the foc's'le (Fc), with four 3-pounder guns (5 cwt, 5 ft) on the poop deck or roundhouse (RH). By 1688 she would carry 70 guns as per the 1685 Establishment. Her initial manning establishment would be for a crew of 460/380/300 personnel.

== Commissioned service ==
=== 1679 to 1699 ===
HMS Burford was commissioned on 15 December 1679 under the command of Captain John Perryman until 30 January 1680 for transport to Chatham. Upon arrival she was placed in Ordinary for nine years in the general neglect of the fleet during the 1680s. She was commissioned in 1689 under the command of Captain Charles Skelton until 1690. In 1691 she was under command of Captain Thomas Harlow. She fought in the Battle of Barfleur in Centre (Red) Squadron, Rear Division from 19 to 22 May 1692. Captain Richard Fitzpatrick was in command in 1696. She was at Ile Groix in July 1696. She would be rebuilt at Deptford in 1699.

=== Rebuilding at Deptford 1696-1699 ===
Like most of her sister third rates of the Thirty Ship Programme HMS Burford was ordered rebuilt in June 1696 under contract by Edward Snelgrove of Deptford. She was docked on 1 November 1697 and completed/launched on 12 September 1698. Her dimensions were a gundeck of 152 feet 9 inches (46.56 metres) with a keel of 126 feet 2 inches (38.46 metres) for tonnage calculation with a breadth of 40 feet 8.75 inches (12.41 metres) and a depth of hold of 16 feet 4.25 inches (4.98 metres). Her builder's measure tonnage was calculated as 1,11325/94 tons (burthen). Her gun armament and crew size would be unchanged.

=== Service from 1699 to 1719 ===
HMS Burford was commissioned in 1700 under Captain Simon Foulkes as guard ship at Sheerness, She was part of the Fleet that escorted HRH King William III to Holland in 1700. With the outbreak of the War of Spanish Succession in May 1702, she was commissioned in 1702 under the command of Captain Hovenden Walker. She sailed with Admiral Sir George Rooke's Fleet on 19 July for operations at Cadiz, Spain. On the 19th of September, after accomplishing little the Fleet sailed for Home detaching HMS Burford with a squadron of smaller ships and troop transports for the West Indies. Initially she was under Captain Thomas Meads in 1703, however, in March Captain William Fairborne took command. She sailed to the West Indies in the Autumn. In 1704 she was under the command of Captain Kerryll Roffey sailing with Sir George Rooke's Fleet. She was the capture of Gibraltar on 23 July 1704. She followed this with the Battle of Velez-Malaga as a member of Center Division on 13 August 1704. She suffered 11 killed with 19 wounded.

In 1705 she was under Captain Boron Wylde for service in the Mediterranean. She spent the winter of 1706/07 with Byng's squadron. In 1707 she was under Captain John Evans followed by Captain Robert Kirktown while she was still in the Mediterranean. In 1710 she was under Captain Thomas Kempthorne. In 1710 she sailed back to Home Waters then returned to the Mediterranean in 1711 with the Broad Pennant of Captain Charles Cornwall. With the end of the war, she underwent a great repair at Portsmouth at a cost of 12,494.13.6d during October 1712 to May 1714. She was recommissioned in 1715 under Captain Edward Hopson and sailed with Norris's Fleet to the Baltic. In 1717 under Captain Thomas Scott, she sailed to the Baltic with Vice-Admiral Sir George Byng's Fleet. In 1718 she was under Captain Charles Vanbrugh sailing with Admiral Sir George Byng's Fleet in the Mediterranean. She fought in the Battle off Cape Passaro south-east of Sicily, on 11 August 1718.

== Loss ==
She was wrecked during a storm in Pentemelia Bay, Italy on 14 February 1719, though her crew was saved.
