= HMS Seaford (1695) =

British warship

History

United Kingdom
- Name: HMS Seaford
- Builder: Richard Herring, Bursledon
- Cost: 1,688.18.2d
- Acquired: 27 December 1695
- Commissioned: Late 1695
- Captured: 5 May 1697
- Fate: Taken by French Squadron and burnt

General characteristics
- Type: 20-gun Sixth Rate
- Tons burthen: 293 60/94 bm
- Length: 98 ft 5 in (30.0 m) gundeck; 81 ft 3 in (24.8 m) keel for tonnage
- Beam: 26 ft 1 in (8.0 m) for tonnage
- Depth of hold: 10 ft 10 in (3.3 m)
- Complement: 110
- Armament: initially as ordered; 24 × sakers on wooden trucks (UD); 4 × 3-pdr on wooden trucks (QD)

HMS Seaford was purchased from Richard Herring of Bursledon, who had built the vessel on speculation to a similar specification as the Maidstone Group. After she was commissioned, she sailed as part of the expedition to recapture Fort York on Hudson Bay. She was also part of Symond's squadron in the West Indies, where she was captured and burnt by the French in 1697.

Seaford was the first named ship in the Royal Navy.

== Construction ==
She was purchased from Richard Herring of Bursledon for 1,688.18.2d per ship with another £2,513. (Note: A total cost accounting for inflation of approximately £281,000 in today's money per ship.) Her gundeck was 98 feet 5 inches (30.0 metres) with a keel length of 81 feet 3 inches (24.8 metres) for tonnage calculation. The breadth would be 26 feet 1 inch (8.0 metres) for tonnage with a depth of hold of 10 feet 18 inches (3.5 metres). The tonnage calculation would be 293 60/94. her gun armament would be twenty-four sakers mounted on wooden trucks located on the upper deck (UD) with a further four 3-pounders (Note: "3-pounder" refers to the weight of the ball fired) mounted on wooden trucks on the quarterdeck (QD). A saker or sacar was a muzzle-loading smoothbore gun of 1,400 pounds in weight with a 3 1/2-inch bore firing a 5 1/2-pound shot with a 5 1/2-pound powder charge.

== Commissioned service ==
She was commissioned in late 1695 under the command of Captain John Grange, RN. She was part of the 1696 Hudson Bay expedition to recapture Fort York at the mouth of the Nelson River. Captain Grange died in August 1696 with Captain John Watkins, RN assuming command on the 14th. On 19 January 1697 Captain George Walton, RN took command and sailed with Symond's squadron to the West Indies in April 1697.

== Disposition ==
HMS Seaford was taken by a French squadron off the Isles of Scilly on 5 May 1697 and burnt.
