= HMS Seahorse (1694 sixth rate) =

British warship

History

England
- Name: HMS Seahorse
- Ordered: 2 May 1694
- Builder: John Haydon, Limehouse
- Launched: 27 September 1694
- Commissioned: 13 August 1694
- Fate: Wrecked 14 March 1704

General characteristics
- Type: 20-gun Sixth Rate
- Tons burthen: 256 45/94 bm
- Length: 92 ft 1 in (28.1 m) gundeck; 77 ft 8 in (23.7 m) keel for tonnage
- Beam: 24 ft 11 in (7.6 m) for tonnage
- Depth of hold: 10 ft 8 in (3.3 m)
- Armament: initially as ordered; 20 × sakers on wooden trucks (UD); 4 × 3-pdr on wooden trucks (QD); 1703 Establishment; 20 × 6-pdrs on wooden trucks (UD); 4 × 4-pdr on wooden trucks (QD)

HMS Seahorse was a member of the standardized 20-gun sixth rates built at the end of the 17th century. After commissioning she spent her career in the North Sea, the English Channel, Irish sea, Newfoundland and finally Jamaica. Mainly employed as a trade protection vessel. She was wrecked in 1704.

Seahorse was the fourth named vessel since it was used for a ship captured in 1626 and last mentioned in 1635.

== Construction ==
She was ordered in the second batch of eight ships to be built under contract by John Haydon of Limehouse. She was launched on 27 September 1694.

== Commissioned service ==
She was commissioned on 13 August 1694 under the command of Captain Nathaniel Grantham, RN, then Captain Anthony Tollett, RN for service in the English Channel. Captain John Drake, RN took command on 15 January 1696 until his death on 22 November 1697 for service in the Irish Sea then on to Newfoundland in 1697. In 1698 Captain George Walton, RN took over, joining Aylmer's squadron in the Mediterranean in November 1698. Captain Hercules Mitchell took command on 29 June 1701 for service at Jamaica. Captain William Russel, RN took command in June 1702 until his death on 30 June 1703. In 1704 she was under the command of either Commander Richard Jones or William James.

== Loss ==
HMS Seahorse was wrecked off Manchinoncal, Jamaica, on 14 March 1704.
