= HMS Charles Galley =

Frigate of the Royal Navy

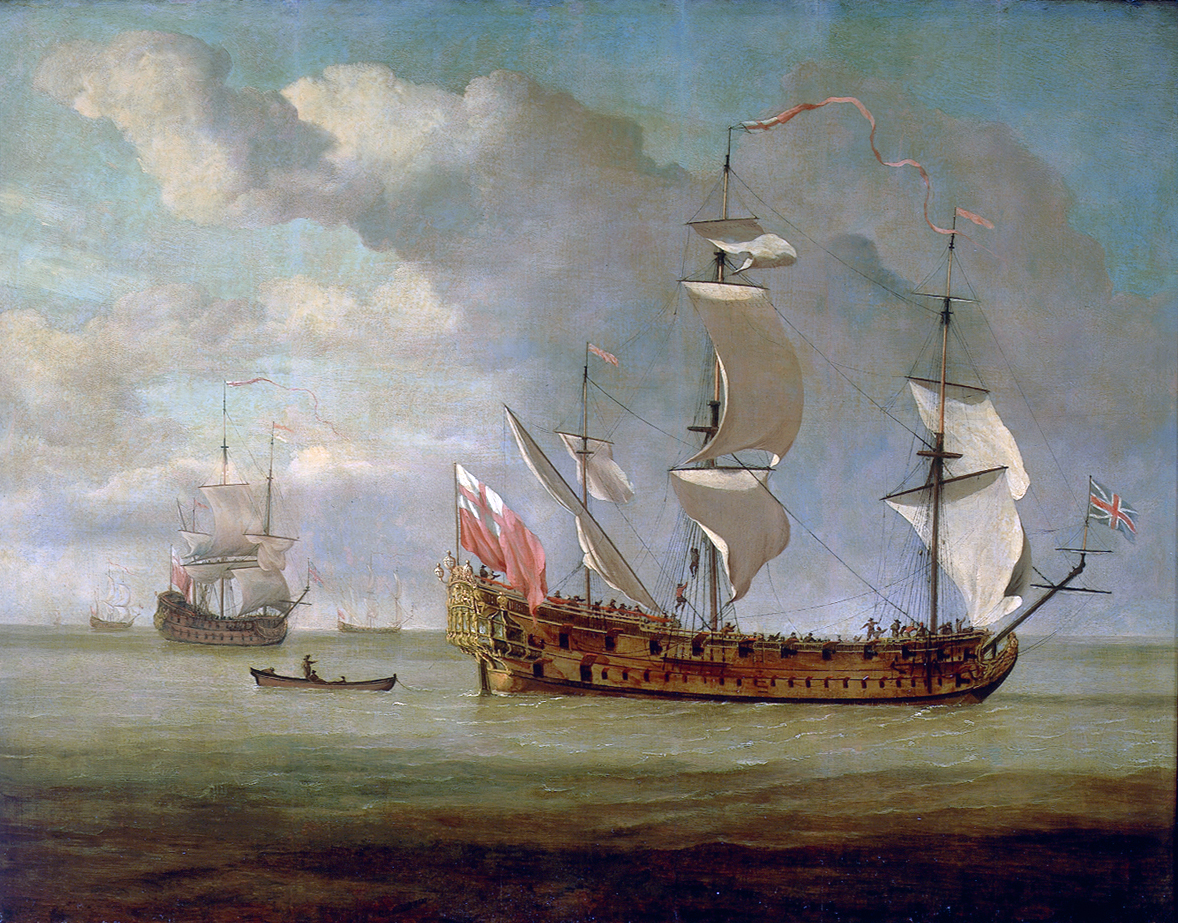
- The Charles Galley in a painting by Willem van de Velde the Younger; late 17th century.

History

Great Britain
- Name: HMS Charles Galley
- Builder: Woolwich Dockyard
- Launched: 1676
- Renamed: HMS Torrington in July 1727
- Reclassified: Hulked in 1740
- Fate: Sold on 12 July 1744

General characteristics as built
- Class & type: 32-gun fifth rate
- Tons burthen: 546 bm
- Length: 131 ft (39.9 m) (overall)
- Beam: 28 ft 6 in (8.7 m)
- Propulsion: Sails
- Sail plan: Full-rigged ship
- Armament: 28 × 9-pdrs; 4 × 3-pdrs

General characteristics after 1693 rebuild
- Tons burthen: 548 bm

General characteristics after 1710 rebuild
- Tons burthen: 537 bm

General characteristics after 1729 rebuild
- Tons burthen: 594 bm

HMS Charles Galley was a 32–gun fifth rate of the Royal Navy built at Woolwich Dockyard and launched in 1676.

She was rebuilt in 1693, and again at Deptford Dockyard in 1710. She was renamed HMS Torrington after a third rebuild in 1729, and was hulked in 1740. She was finally sold on 12 July 1744.
