= Oreste (given name) =

- Gender: Male

Origin
- Origin: Orestes
- Region of origin: Italy

Other names
- Related names: Orestes

Oreste is an Italian masculine given name. It is derived from the Orestes, who in Greek mythology is the son of Clytemnestra and Agamemnon. People with the name Oreste include:

- Oreste Albertini (1887–1953), Italian painter
- Oreste Barale (also known as Barale III) (1904–1982), Italian footballer
- Oreste Baratieri (1841–1901), Italian general and governor of Eritrea
- Oreste Benatti (1909–??), Italian footballer
- Oreste Baldini (born 1962), Italian actor and voice dubbing artist
- Oreste Benzi (1925–2007), Italian Catholic priest
- Oreste Biancoli (1897–1971), Italian screenwriter and film director
- Oreste Bilancia (1881–1945), Italian actor
- Oreste Candi (1865–1938), Italian luthier
- Oreste Capuzzo (1908–1985), Italian gymnast and Olympic competitor
- Oreste Casalini (1962–2020), Italian painter and sculptor
- Oreste Cioni (1913–1968), Italian footballer
- Oreste Conte (1919–1956), Italian racing cyclist
- Oreste Giorgi (1856–1924), Italian Cardinal of the Roman Catholic Church
- Oreste Grossi (1912–2008), Italian rower and Olympic medal winner
- Oreste Kirkop (1923–1998), Maltese opera singer
- Oreste Lionello (1927–2009), Italian actor and voice dubbing artist
- Oreste Marrero (born 1969), Puerto Rican baseball player
- Oreste Moricca (1891–1984), Italian fencer and Olympic medalist
- Oreste Perri (born 1951), Italian sprint canoer, politician and Olympic competitor
- Oreste Piccioni (1915–2002), Italian-born American physicist
- Oreste Pinto (1889–1961), Dutch counterintelligence officer, Lieutenant colonel and author
- Oreste Piro (born 1954), Argentinian-born Spanish dynamical systems theorist and biophysicist
- Oreste Puliti (1891–1958), Italian fencer and Olympic medalist
- Oreste Ramos (Born ????), Puerto Rican politician
- Oreste Ravanello (1871–1938), Italian composer and organist
- Oreste Recchione (1841–1904), Italian painter
- Oreste Riva (1860–1936), Italian composer
- Oreste Rizzini (1940–2008), Italian actor and voice dubbing artist
- Oreste Scalzone (born 1947), Italian Marxist intellectual and political activist
- Oreste Silvestri (1858–1936), Italian painter
- Oreste Sindici (1828–1904), Italian-born Colombian musician and composer
- Oreste Squinobal (1943–2004), Italian mountain climber, mountain guide and ski mountaineer
- Oreste Tescari (born c. 1923), Italian rugby player
- Oreste Vaccari (1886–1980), Italian Orientalist and linguist
- Oreste Zamor (1861–1915), Haitian politician, former President of Haiti
