= Cioni =

Cioni is an Italian surname. Notable people with the surname include:

- Daniele Cioni (1959-2021), Italian sport shooter
- Dario Cioni (born 1974), Italian cyclist
- Graziano Cioni (born 1946), Italian politician.
- Gilles Cioni (born 1984), French football player
- Filippo Cioni (1461-1520), Italian translator and notary
- Oreste Cioni (1913 – after 1966), Italian football player and manager
- Renato Cioni (1929–2014), Italian opera singer
- Vittorio Cioni (1900–1981), Italian rower

== See also ==
- 12812 Cioni, main-belt asteroid named after Giovanni Cioni (1943–2002), an amateur astronomer
