= Orestes (disambiguation) =

Orestes was the son of Agamemnon and Clytemnestra in Greek mythology.

Orestes or Orestis may also refer to:

== Other people ==
- Orestes (mythology), several figures in Greek mythology
- Lucius Aurelius Orestes (consul 157 BC)
- Lucius Aurelius Orestes (consul 126 BC), governor of Sardinia
- Orestes (prefect of Egypt) (fl. 415 AD)
- Orestes (father of Romulus Augustulus) (died 476 AD)
- Orestes (given name), including a list of people the name

== Arts and entertainment ==
- Orestes (play), an Ancient Greek play by Euripides
- Orestes, a character in Sophocles's tragedy Electra
- Orestes, a character in Aeschylus's trilogy of Greek tragedies Oresteia
- "Orestes", a song by A Perfect Circle from the 2000 album Mer de Noms

== Places ==
- Orestes, Indiana, United States
- Mount Orestes, Victoria Land, Antarctica
- Orestes Valley, Victoria Land, Antarctica
- Orestes Glacier, Victoria Land, Antarctica
- 13475 Orestes, an asteroid sharing the planet Jupiter's orbit

== Other uses ==
- Orestes (insect), a genus of stick insects
- HMS Orestes, the name of several Royal Navy ships
- USS Orestes, a United States Navy motor torpedo boat tender

== See also ==
- Horestes, a Tudor morality play by John Pickering
- Oreste
- Orestis (region), in Upper Macedonia, and its inhabitants, the Orestae
- The Tragedy of Orestes, a play by Thomas Goffe first performed c. 1613–1618 and published 1633
