= Oreste (disambiguation) =

Oreste may refer to:

- Oreste (given name)
- Oreste (Handel), opera by George Frideric Handel

== See also ==
- Orestes (disambiguation)
- Michel Oreste (1859–1918), president of Haiti
