= Orestes (given name) =

Orestes or Orestis (Greek: Ορέστης) is a Greek name meaning 'mountain dweller'.

Orestes in Greek mythology is the son of Clytemnestra and Agamemnon, brother of Electra and Iphigenia. He is noted for avenging the murder of his father by killing his mother and her lover Aegisthus, whereafter he was pursued by the Furies and driven mad.

Equivalents in different languages include:

- Aresti – found mostly in the Basque country and the island of Sardinia
- Oreste – Italian
- Orest (Cyrillic: Орест) – Ukrainian (sometimes Oryst in transliteration), Polish and Russian

== Given name ==
- Orest Banach (born 1948), American soccer player
- Orest Khvolson (1852–1934), Russian physicist
- Orest Kindrachuk (born 1950), Canadian ice hockey player
- Orest Kiprensky (1782–1836), Russian artist and portraitist
- Orest Lenczyk (born 1942), Polish soccer manager
- Orest Levytsky (1848–1922), Ukrainian historian
- Orest Meleschuk (born 1940), Canadian curler
- Orest Miller (1833–1889), Russian folklorist and academic
- Orest Onofrei (born 1957), Romanian veterinarian and politician
- Orest Romashyna (born 1946), Canadian ice hockey player
- Orest Somov (1793–1833), Ukrainian writer
- Orest Subtelny (1941–2016), Canadian historian
- Orest Sushko, Canadian sound mixer
- Orest Tereshchuk (born 1981), Ukrainian tennis player
- Orest Zerebko (1887–1943), Canadian journalist and politician
- Oreste Biancoli (1897–1971), Italian screenwriter and film director
- Oreste Squinobal (1943–2004), Italian mountain climber and ski mountaineer
- Oreste Recchione (1841–1904), Italian painter
- Oreste Tescari (born 1923), Italian rugby player
- Orestes (father of Romulus Augustulus) (died 476), Roman politician and associate of Attila the Hun
- Orestes (prefect), 5th-century official of Alexandria
- Orestes of Cappadocia, Christian martyr under Diocletian
- Orestes of Jerusalem (died 1006), Patriarch of Jerusalem (986–1006)
- Orestes of Macedon (died 397/8 BC), king in the 4th century BCE
- Orestes Brownson (1803–1876), American publisher
- Orestes Caviglia (1893–1971), Argentine film director and actor
- Orestes A. Crowell (1872–1967), American politician
- Orestes Destrade (born 1962), American baseball player
- Orestes Garrison (1813–1874), American politician
- Orestes Junior Alves (born 1981), Brazilian soccer player
- Orestes Kindelán (born 1964), Cuban baseball player
- Orestes López (1908–1991), Cuban bandleader
- Orestes "Minnie" Miñoso (1923–2015), Cuban-born professional baseball player and MLB Hall of Famer
- Orestes Ojeda (1956-2021), Filipino actor
- Orestes Quércia (1938–2010), Brazilian politician
- Orestes Rodríguez Williams (born 1989), Cuban sprinter and Olympic competitor
- Orestes St. John (1841–1921), American geologist and paleontologist
- Orestes Vilató (born 1944), Cuban-American musician
- Orestis Karnezis (born 1985), Greek soccer player
- Orestis Laskos (1907–1992), Greek film director, screenwriter and actor
- Orestis Makris (1898–1975), Greek actor and tenor
- Saint Orestes (died 60 AD), Christian martyr
- Oreste Calleja (born 1946), Maltese playwright
