= Onofrei =

Onofrei is a Romanian surname that may refer to:

- Constantin Onofrei (born 9 May 1976), Romanian former professional boxer
- Octavian Onofrei (born 16 May 1991), Moldovan football forward
- Orest Onofrei (born 17 March 1957), Romanian veterinarian and politician
- Liliana Nicolaescu-Onofrei (born 6 November 1968), Moldovan politician
