= National Anthem of Colombia =

Himno Nacional de la República de Colombia
English: National Anthem of the Republic of Colombia
- Front page of the sheet music to the National Anthem of Colombia
- National anthem of Colombia
- Lyrics: Rafael Núñez, 1850, 1883
- Music: Oreste Sindici, 1887
- Adopted: 28 October 1920

Audio sample
- ¡Oh, gloria inmarcesible! by the US Navy Band (two choruses and one verse): file; help

The National Anthem of the Republic of Colombia (Note: Spanish: Himno Nacional de la República de Colombia) is the official name of the national anthem of Colombia. It was originally written as a poem in 1850 by future President Rafael Núñez as an ode to celebrate the independence of Cartagena. The music was composed by Italian-born opera musician Oreste Síndici, at the request of Bogotan actor José Domingo Torres, during the presidency of Núñez, and with lyrics refined by Núñez himself, it was presented to the public for the first time on 11 November 1887. The song became very popular and was quickly adopted, albeit spontaneously, as the national anthem of Colombia.

It was made official through Law 33 of 18 October 1920. Colombian musician José Rozo Contreras reviewed the scores and prepared the transcriptions for symphonic band, which was adopted as an official version by decree 1963 of 4 July 1946. The anthem has been performed in various versions, been the subject of attempted reforms and been widely performed in the arts.

The lyrics of the anthem are composed of a chorus and eleven stanzas, though it is usually sung chorus–first stanza–chorus.

== History ==
=== Background ===
In 1819, the contradanzas "La vencedora" and "La libertadora" were performed to celebrate the triumph of the patriots in the Battle of Boyacá. After the independence of Colombia in 1810 and the dissolution of Gran Colombia in 1831, numerous songs were written in honour of the liberator Simón Bolívar. One of the first antecedents of the national anthem was presented on 20 July 1836, when the Spanish Francisco Villalba, who had arrived in Colombia with a theatre company, composed a patriotic song for the Republic of New Granada. The song became very popular and was considered the first patriotic anthem in the country. The verses of the chorus were as follows:

Spanish original

Gloria eterna a la Nueva Granada,
Que, formando una nueva nación, (Note: Occasionally written que formando una sola nación ("which, forming a single nation,").)
Hoy levanta ya el templo sagrado
De las leyes, la paz y la unión.

English translation

Eternal glory to New Granada,
Which, forming a new nation,
Today already raises the sacred temple
Of laws, peace and union.

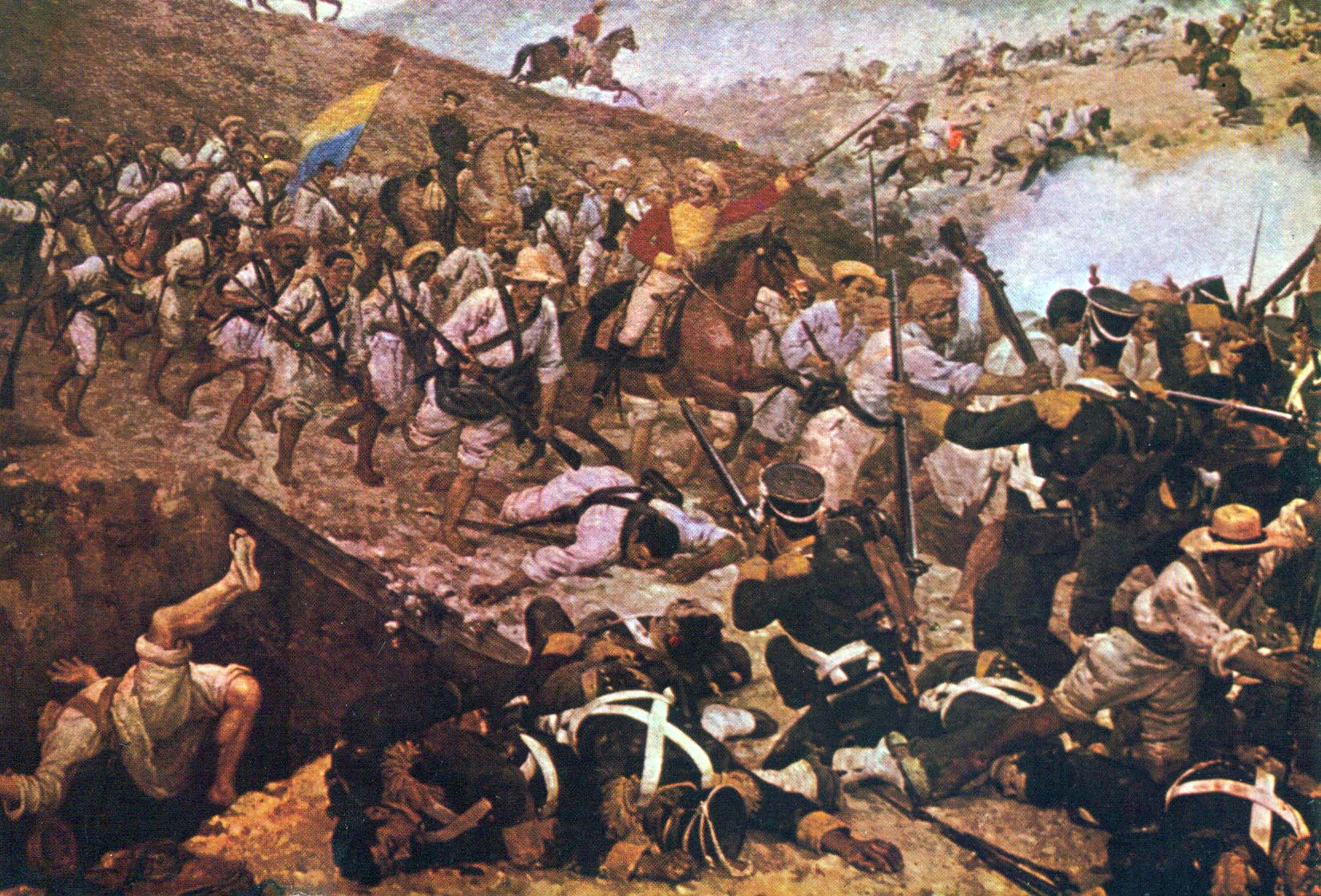
The contradanza The victor was performed on the field of the Battle of Boyacá.

In 1847, English composer and painter Henry Price, founder of the Philharmonic Society of Bogotá, put music to some verses written by Santiago Pérez in an anthem called "Canción nacional" ("National Song"), which was not widely accepted, due to its simplicity. Henry Price was the father of Jorge Wilson Price, who, after living in New York City, returned to Bogotá in 1855 to dedicate himself to translating compositions and founding the National Academy of Music of Colombia in 1882, inviting the young Italian composer Oreste Síndici as an adviser and professor of the academy. In 1910, the National Academy of Music would become the National Conservatory of Colombia.

In 1849, José Caicedo Rojas wrote a poem, and José Joaquín Guarín composed the melody of an anthem called "Oda al 20 de julio" ("Ode to 20 July"), which was set to music in the key of E flat for four voices and orchestra. Its premiere was held at the Museum of Colonial Art, but due to its complexity, it did not convince the public either. In 1883, Dutch violinist Carlos Von Oecken set music to a poem written by Lino de Pombo in 1852.

Decree 256 of 12 April 1881 called for a competition to select the national anthem. The jurors for this contest were politician José María Quijano, poet Rafael Pombo and musician Carlos Schloss. In the reviews published in different newspapers, it was stated that none of the anthems performed aroused enthusiasm in the spirit of the jury and that for this reason the competition was declared void.

On 1 July 1883, the government of the Sovereign State of Cundinamarca organised a competition to select the anthem on the occasion of the centennial of the birth of the Liberator (Bolívar), on 24 July. The first prize was obtained by Daniel Figueroa, who composed an anthem with lyrics from various poems that premiered at the Plaza de Bolívar with a choir of 2,000 children. The second prize was obtained by Cayetano Fajardo. For its part, the jury noted that none of the awarded anthems were classified as national anthems but rather patriotic songs.

=== Composition ===
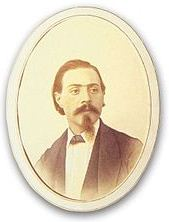
Oreste Sindici, c. 1870

In 1887, theatre director José Domingo Torres, who was used to enlivening the national holidays, sought out Síndici to ask him to write a song on the occasion of the celebration of the independence of Cartagena, which was the first Colombian city to declare independence from the Spanish, on 11 November 1811. For the song, Domingo Torres asked him to score a poem called Himno Patriótico ("Patriotic Hymn"), written by President of the Republic Rafael Núñez, in honour of Cartagena, which was composed to be declared publicly during the celebration of 11 November 1850 and published in the newspaper La Democracia, when Núñez was still secretary of government of the Province of Cartagena. After this first publication, the poem was adapted, improved and published by Núñez himself in the magazine Hebdomadaria number 3 and 4, July 1883. A previous musicalisation of the same poem by Núñez, performed by maestros Delgado and Fortich, at the request of José Domingo Torres himself, which was performed at the Plaza de Bolívar on 20 July 1880, failed to gain acceptance among the audience present.

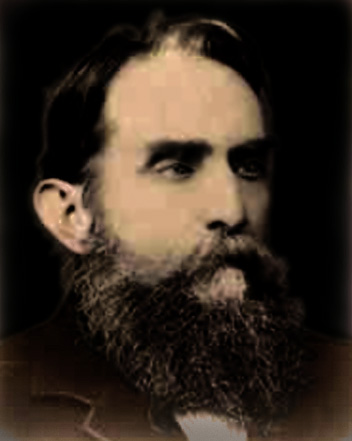
Rafael Núñez, c. 1885

The following is the original poem by Rafael Núñez from 1850:

Himno patriótico
(Spanish original)

Del once de noviembre
Mañana brilla el sol
Salud al gran suceso
De nuestra redención.

Cayeron las cadenas de
La libertad sublime
Derrama en todo el orbe
Su bendecida luz.

La humanidad entera
Que esclavizada gime
Comprende las doctrinas
Del que murió en la cruz.

¡Independencia! grita
El pueblo americano
Aniéganse en su sangre
Los hijos de Colón;

Pero este gran principio:
«El pueblo es soberano»
Resuena más vibrante
Que el eco del cañón.

Patriotic Anthem
(English translation)

From 11 November
Tomorrow the sun shines
Hail to the great event
Of our redemption.

The chains fell, of
Sublime liberty
It spills all over the world
Its blessed light.

The whole of humanity
That moans enslaved
Understands the doctrines
Of He who died on the cross.

Independence! shouts
The American people
Are bathed in their blood
The children of Columbus;

But this great principle:
"The people are sovereign"
Resonates more vibrant
Than the echo of the cannon.

Initially, Síndici refused to compose the song, despite Torres's insistence. He finally managed to convince himself, through his wife Justina Jannaut. Prior to that, Síndici had demanded that José Domingo Torres look for the author of the poem so that he would adjust the verses according to the necessary arrangement for a melody and give them a national connotation.

For the composition of the anthem, Síndici retired to his Hacienda "El Prado" ("The Meadow") in Nilo, Cundinamarca, carrying a Dolt Graziano Tubi harmonium. The original score in the key of E-flat major and four-beat measure (tempo di marcia) is currently kept in the National Museum of Colombia. The pre-premiere of the melody took place under a tamarind tree in the main park of the Cundinamarca municipality on 24 July 1887, after Sunday mass.

The national anthem was premiered on 11 November 1887 during the celebration of the independence of Cartagena with a choir of children from three primary schools, students of Síndici. This first interpretation of the anthem was performed at the Teatro de Variedades (Theatre of Varieties) of the public school of Santa Clara, which was located in the current carrera octava (Eighth Avenue), on the site of the Church of Santa Clara, adjacent to the Convent and to the Astronomical Observatory, in the jurisdiction of the Bogotá Cathedral neighbourhood. Included within the programme of celebrations of that date was the laying of the first stone of the Municipal Theatre of Bogotá in this same place; the theatre was inaugurated in 1890 and operated there until its demolition and transfer to the Jorge Eliécer Gaitán Theater in 1952.

President Núñez learnt of the impact of the melody and invited Oreste Síndici to present it officially. To that end, Minister of Government Felipe Fermín Paul was commissioned to organise a presentation of the anthem on 6 December of the same year at 9 p.m. in the grade room of the Palacio de San Carlos, currently located in the Museum of Colonial Art. The anthem was sung by a choir of 25 voices in the presence of the main civil, ecclesiastical and military authorities of the country. In the invitation to the event, the song was already announced as the "National Anthem".

=== Distribution ===
The song quickly became well known, and several editions were published throughout the country in the following years. In 1890, the anthem was performed in Rome, Mexico, Lima, Caracas and Curaçao. The first phonographic recording was made at the Columbia Phonograph Company studios in New York City in July 1910, performed by the musical group La Lira Antioqueña (The Antioquian Lyre) to celebrate the first centenary of the independence of Colombia. The national anthem appears referenced as such in various publications of the time, prior to its official adoption. Thus, an essay by Manuel María Fajardo from 1908, the patriotic primer by Camilo Villegas y González from 1910, a text of selected poems by Lisímaco Palau from 1912 and a hymn book by Ernesto Murillo from 1917 already cite the song composed by Oreste Síndici as the national anthem of Colombia. The lyrics and sheet music of the anthem were also included in the centennial urn that was closed on 31 October 1911 and that was opened during the celebration of the Bicentennial of Colombia, on 20 July 2010.

For the adoption of the national anthem, the representative to the Chamber for the department of Nariño, Sergio Burbano, presented the bill on 9 August 1920. The plan was approved in the debate of the public instruction commission and later by the plenary session of the Congress of the Republic, making it official by Law 33 of 18 October 1920, which was sanctioned by President Marco Fidel Suárez. In this law, an expert opinion was also requested to recognise the artistic property rights of the heirs of Oreste Síndici.

During the border conflict with Peru (1932–1934), the soldiers who defended national sovereignty sang a refrain in the trumpet introduction when entering the battle front, in accordance with the warlike moment that the nation was experiencing. This transitory stanza stood as the following:

Spanish original

Hoy que la madre patria se halla herida,
hoy que debemos todos combatir, combatir,
vamos a dar por ella nuestra vida, (Note: Sometimes written Demos por ella nuestra vida ("Let us give our life for her").)
que morir por la patria no es morir, es vivir.

English translation

Now that the motherland finds herself wounded,
Now that we must all fight, fight,
We are going to give our life for her,
Since to die for the fatherland is not to die, it is to live.

This introduction was taught to students in primary schools in the 1930s, according to historian José Antonio Amaya, and it was still being taught in the 1960s. The final line is very similar to a line in the national anthem of Cuba that goes, "¡Que morir por la patria es vivir!"

As time went by, different versions of the anthem appeared. In 1946, the Ministry of National Education, with the aim of unifying the criteria, appointed a commission made up of experts. As a result of this investigation, the government issued executive decree number 1963 of 4 July 1946, stating that the official scores and the transcriptions for symphony orchestra of the anthem made by Norte de Santander musician José Rozo Contreras in 1933 are the most faithful to the originals written by Oreste Síndici. Since then, this version has been officially adopted. During the government of Belisario Betancur, San Andrés residents were authorised to sing a version of the anthem in English and indigenous peoples to sing the version in their own languages.

Decree 3558 of 9 November 1949, which approves the "Garrison Service Regulations", is the first protocol norm that establishes the occasions on which the anthem must be sung. Law 12 of 29 February 1984 ratified in its article 4 the validity of the national anthem of Colombia.

Law 198 of 17 July 1995, which legislates national symbols, made it mandatory to broadcast them on all radio and television stations in the country at both 6:00 a.m. and 6:00 p.m. (with the latter medium, on a varied schedule for those deprived of clear signal and not applicable to national cable TV channels), as well as during public addresses by the President of the Republic and other official events.

== Lyrics ==
The national anthem is made up of an Alexandrine chorus and eleven stanzas in heptasyllabic octavillas; but throughout its execution, only the chorus and the first stanza are usually performed. The stanzas are a recount of historical events and philosophical reflections on the independence of Colombia and other Latin American countries. Stanzas I and III can be described as evocative, stanzas II, V, and XI heroic, stanzas VI and VII epic, stanzas IV and VIII elegiac, and stanzas IX and X synthetic. The music has a tonality of E flat major and 4/4 time (tempo di marcia).

Spanish original

Coro:
¡O, gloria inmarcesible!
¡O, júbilo inmortal!
En surcos de dolores,
𝄆 el bien germina ya. 𝄇

¡O, gloria inmarcesible!
¡O, júbilo inmortal!
En surcos de dolores,
el bien germina ya.

I
Cesó la horrible noche.
La libertad sublime
derrama las auroras
de su invencible luz.

La humanidad entera,
que entre cadenas gime,
comprende las palabras
del que murió en La Cruz.

Coro

II
"¡Independencia!", grita
el mundo americano.
Se baña en sangre de héroes
la tierra de Colón.

Pero este gran principio;
"El rey no es soberano" (Note: Some versions give "El pueblo es soberano" ("People are sovereign").)
resuena, y los que sufren
bendicen su pasión.

Coro

III
Del Orinoco el cauce
se colma de despojos,
de sangre y llanto un río
se mira allí correr.

En Bárbula no saben
las almas ni los ojos,
si admiración o espanto
sentir o padecer.

Coro

IV
A orillas del Caribe,
hambriento un pueblo lucha,
horrores prefiriendo
a pérfida salud.

¡Oh, sí!, de Cartagena
la abnegación es mucha,
y escombros de la muerte
desprecia su virtud.

Coro

V
De Boyacá en los campos,
el genio de la gloria,
con cada espiga un héroe
invicto coronó.

Soldados sin coraza
ganaron la victoria;
su varonil aliento
de escudo les sirvió.

Coro

VI
Bolívar cruza el Ande
que riegan dos océanos,
espadas cual centellas
fulguran en Junín.

Centauros indomables
descienden a los llanos,
y empieza a presentirse,
de la epopeya el fin.

Coro

VII
La trompa victoriosa
en Ayacucho truena,
que en cada triunfo crece
su formidable son.

En su expansivo empuje
la libertad se estrena,
del cielo americano
formando un pabellón.

Coro

VIII
La virgen sus cabellos
arranca en agonía
y de su amor viuda
los cuelga del ciprés.

Lamenta su esperanza
que cubre loza fría,
pero glorioso orgullo
circunda su alba tez.

Coro

IX
La patria así se forma,
termópilas brotando;
constelación de cíclopes
su noche iluminó.

La flor estremecida
mortal el viento hallando,
debajo los laureles
seguridad buscó.

Coro

X
Mas no es completa gloria
vencer en la batalla,
que el brazo que combate
lo anima la verdad.

La independencia sola
el gran clamor no acalla;
si el sol alumbra a todos,
justicia es libertad.

Coro

XI
Del hombre los derechos
Nariño predicando,
el alma de la lucha
profético enseñó.

Ricaurte en San Mateo,
en átomos volando,
"Deber antes que vida,"
con llamas escribió.

Coro

English translation

Chorus:
Oh, unwithering glory!
Oh, immortal jubilance!
In furrows of pain,
𝄆 goodness now germinates. 𝄇

Oh, unwithering glory!
Oh, immortal jubilance!
In furrows of pain,
goodness now germinates.

I
The horrible night has ceased.
Sublime Liberty
spills the auroras
of her invincible light.

The entirety of humanity
that groans within chains,
comprehend the words
of He who died on the cross.

Chorus

II
"Independence!" shouts
the American world;
The land of Columbus.
Is bathed in heroes' blood.

But this great doctrine;
"The king is not sovereign",
resounds, and those who suffer
bless their passion.

Chorus

III
The bed of the Orinoco
Is heaped with plunder,
Of blood and tears a river
is seen to flow there.

In Bárbula know
neither souls nor eyes,
whether admiration to feel
or fear to suffer.

Chorus

IV
On the shores of the Caribbean,
a famished people fight,
preferring horror
to fickle health.

O, aye! from Cartagena
heavy is the hardship,
and death's rubble
disdains her virtue

Chorus

V
From Boyacá in the fields,
the genius of glory,
from every sprig a hero
was crowned undefeated.

Soldiers without armor
won the victory;
their virile spirit
served them as a shield.

Chorus

VI
Bolívar crosses the Andes
bathed by two oceans,
swords as though sparks
flash in Junín.

Indomitable centaurs
descend to the plains,
and a premonition begins to be felt,
of the epic's end.

Chorus

VII
The victorious trumpet
in Ayacucho loudly thunders,
as in every triumph grows
its formidable sound.

In its expansive thrust
Liberty is first felt,
from the American sky
forming a pavilion.

Chorus

VIII
In agony, the Virgin
Tears out her hair,
and bereft of her love,
leaves it to hang on a cypress.

Regretting her hope
covered by a cold headstone,
but glorious pride
hallows her fair skin.

Chorus

IX
Thus the motherland is formed,
Thermopylaes bursting forth;
a constellation of cyclops
the night did brighten.

The trembling flower
finding the wind mortal,
underneath the laurels
safety sought.

Chorus

X
But it's not complete glory
to defeat in battle,
the arm that fights
is encouraged by truth.

For independence alone
The great clamour doesn't silence;
if the sun shines on everyone,
justice is liberty.

Chorus

XI
Of men the rights
Nariño's preaching,
the soul of struggle
was prophetically taught.

Ricaurte in San Mateo,
in atoms flying,
"Duty before life,"
with flames he wrote.

Chorus

== Protocol ==
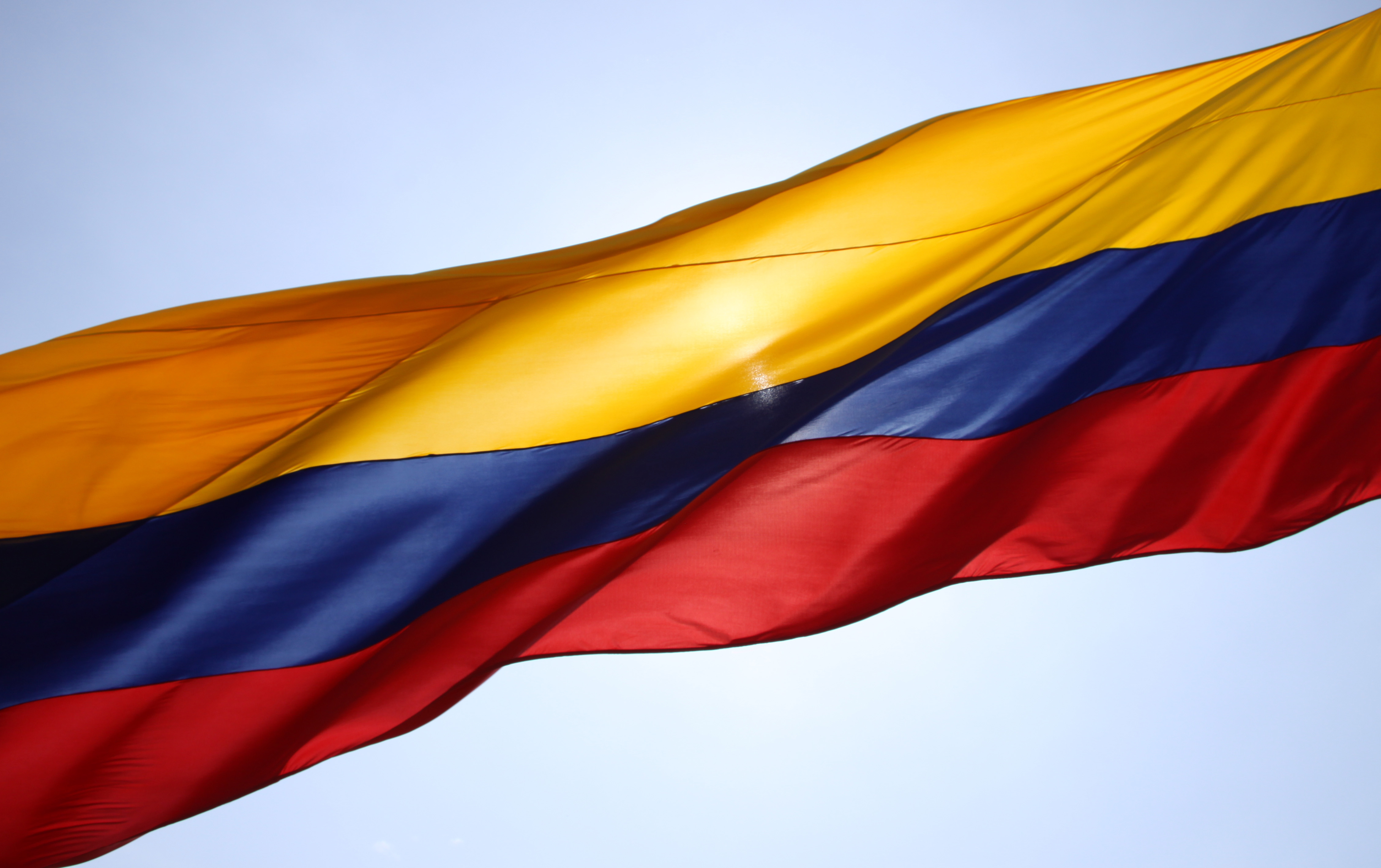
The National Anthem must be sung when raising and lowering the Colombian flag.

The rules of protocol for singing and listening to the national anthem of Colombia are regulated in articles 10 and 11 of decree 1967 of 15 August 1991. The national anthem is authorised to be played at official functions that have a patriotic character, when raising and lowering the flag of Colombia, when honouring the Blessed Sacrament and at educational events and sports competitions. It is also authorised to sing it with or without musical accompaniment by the general public.

When listening to the national anthem, those present must stop their activities and stand up, and the men must uncover their heads. All people should release their arms and adopt a posture of respect and veneration. Riders, drivers and passengers of the vehicles must alight and proceed accordingly. The national anthem is never applauded.

By decree 91 of 21 January 1942, only Colombian patriotic anthems are allowed to be sung in the country's educational institutions, with the exception of special ceremonies in honour of friendly countries that are held on campus. In accordance with decree 1722 of 16 July 1942, all schools must begin their tasks on the first Monday of each month with a brief but solemn act during which the flag is raised to the chords of the national anthem, sung by the whole community. According to the Protocol Manual of the Ministry of Foreign Affairs, for the presentation of the credentials of a new ambassador, the performance of the national anthem is assigned to the Band of Musicians of the Presidential Guard Battalion.

=== Verses ===
The anthem should be played chorus-verse-chorus. Although the first verse is usually sung between choruses, any of the eleven verses may be used. This is how it is customarily performed in all public, political, and other important events both public and private.

However, it is not uncommon for only the chorus and verse to be played without repeating the chorus. This is usually the case when brevity is sought. Official 6:00 am and 6:00 pm radio broadcasts of the national anthem invariably use the shorter format. The shorter anthem is also used at international events such as the Olympic Games or World Cup.

In ceremonies of the Colombian Artillery, the last verse is used instead of the first verse. The Colombian Cavalry traditionally uses the sixth verse, while the fourth verse is used by the Colombian Navy.

== Attempted reforms ==
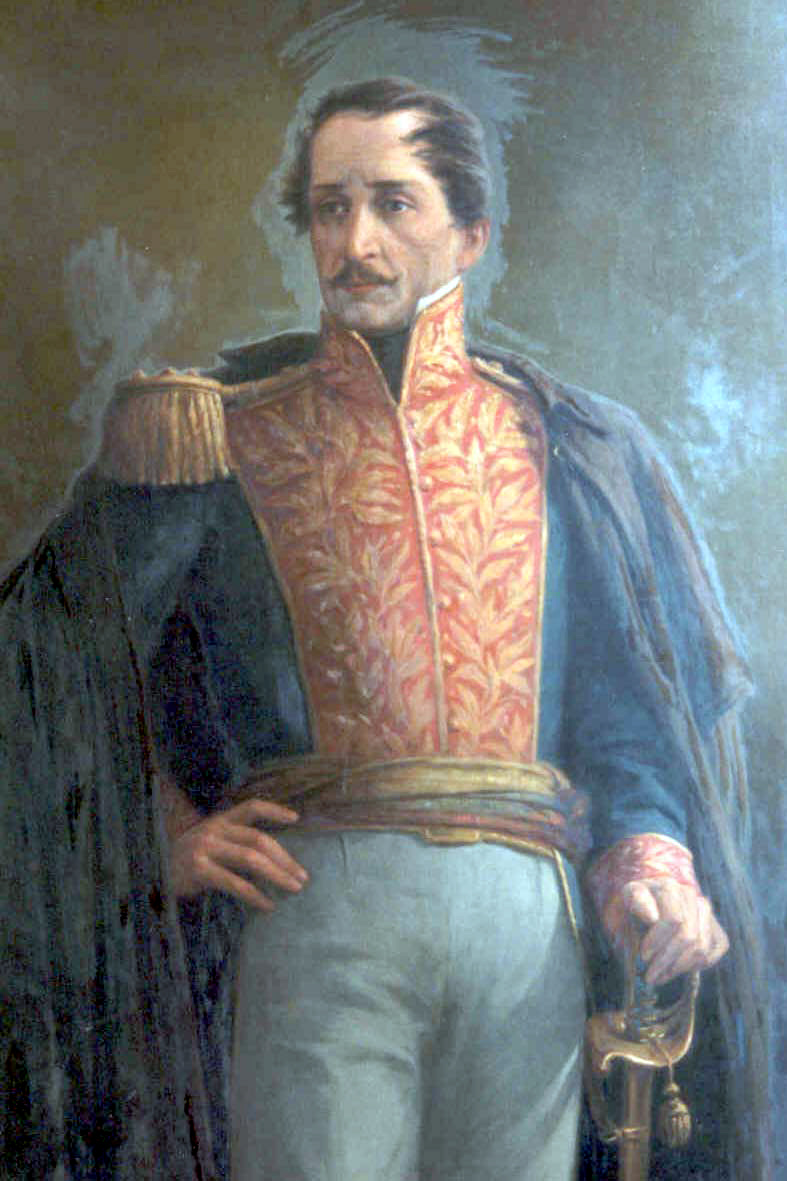
Francisco de Paula Santander

On 25 September 1997, a citizen filed a lawsuit of unconstitutionality against ten of the eleven stanzas of the national anthem and inexorability of the regulations that officially adopted it because, according to the plaintiff, the lyrics constitute an apology for violence and religious discrimination and encourage class struggle. The constitutional court, through ruling C-469, declared Law 33 of 1920, which adopted the national anthem, enforceable. Responding to the aforementioned demand, the Constitutional Court indicated in the judgment:

"The national anthem is a poetic-musical composition whose point is to honour historical figures and events that contributed to the emergence of the Colombian nation. Its lyrical inspiration, typical of the time of its composition, does not adopt a normative content of an abstract nature that forces its realisation by the social conglomerate. Materially, it does not create, extinguish or modify objective and general legal situations; its scope is not properly legal and, therefore, does not go beyond the philosophical, historical and patriotic meaning expressed in its stanzas. The anthem, as a national symbol, has been part of the Nation's cultural heritage for more than a century, a heritage that, moreover, enjoys the protection of the State. It does not in itself have binding force as a norm of positive law. No one is forced, then, by its stanzas, and to pretend otherwise is to fall into the absurd."

A 2008 bill proposed that citizens be ordered to take a firm stance with their heads held high and their right hands over their hearts when listening to the national anthem. The plan was inspired by the gesture that former president Álvaro Uribe usually adopts when singing the national anthem.

Another bill that was processed in the Colombian Congress was that presented by Senator Carlos Emiro Barriga of the Second Commission of the Senate of the Republic on 30 April 2009, in which he proposed a change to the last lines of the sixth stanza as follows:

Spanish original

Centauros indomables ascienden de los llanos
y Santander encabeza de la epopeya el fin."

English translation

Indomitable centaurs rise from the plains
and Santander heads the end of the epic.

The modification, supported by the Academia de Historia de Norte de Santander, intended to include in its text General Francisco de Paula Santander as the ruler who has ruled the nation's destinies for the longest time, as president and founder of public education in the country.

In 2016, it was proposed to add a new stanza in commemoration of the Peace Dialogues that had taken place that year.

== Versions ==
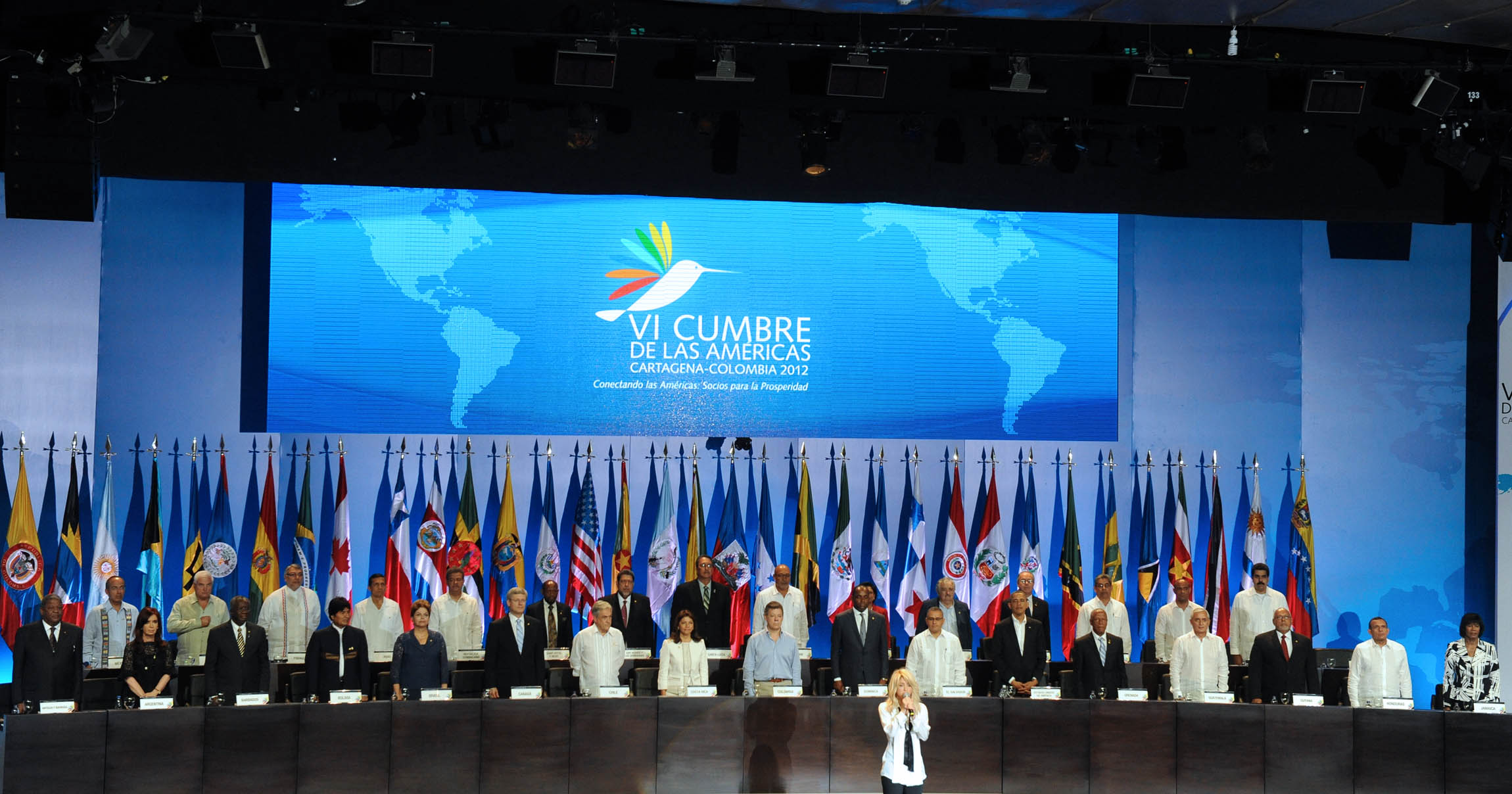
Shakira performing the Colombian anthem a cappella at the 6th Summit of the Americas in April 2012

The first edition of the national anthem published by Oreste Síndici included the scores for singing and piano performances. From then on, different transcriptions and versions appeared, until the officialisation in 1946 of the scores for symphonic band and military band published by José Rozo Contreras. In addition to these scores, Rozo himself published a version for a cappella mixed choir for soprano, alto, tenor and bass voices.

The national anthem has been performed with an accordion and a vallenato rhythm on several occasions, notably within the framework of the Festival de la Leyenda Vallenata. Some of these performances have been made by Jorge Celedón, Rafael Orozco and Silvestre Dangond. A version of the anthem in rock rhythm by the group Ekhymosis, of which Juanes was a member, made in 1995 for the radio station Radioacktiva generated controversy in various media.

The animated series El siguiente programa ("The Following Programme"), in episode 4 of the second season, created the parody the "Chibchombia National Anthem", known as the "Anthem of Corruption".

The version of the national anthem on marimba was presented in June 2009 by the secretariat of culture of Valle del Cauca with indigenous rhythms of the Colombian Pacific under the musical direction of Raúl Rosero, in the celebration of the centenary of the creation of the department of Valle del Cauca.

In the National Concert of the Bicentennial of Colombia in July 2010, different versions of the anthem were heard in various cities of the country, in various languages and in various styles of interpretation. The anthem was performed in a llanera harp version with the voice of Orlando "El Cholo" Valderrama and the National Symphony Orchestra in Tame, sung a cappella by Shakira in the city of Leticia, and performed in the Wayuu, Choco and San Andrés–Providencia Creole languages, among others. Shakira performed the anthem again a cappella during the inauguration of the 6th Summit of the Americas at the Cartagena de Indias Convention Center on 14 April 2012.

== Representations ==
=== Art ===
The national anthem has been referenced through different artistic manifestations. In poetry, two compositions can be mentioned in honour of the national anthem that were published in the newspaper La Pluma de Cali in June 1944, which were included by educator Evangelista Quintana in his article titled La escuela pública da a Colombia su Himno Nacional ("The Public School Gives Colombia Its National Anthem").

The triumphal arch erected on the Boyacá Bridge is the only monument that contains the lyrics of the national anthem. The arch was built in 1954 by teacher Luis Alberto Acuña and contains the complete notes of the anthem in the lower part, which is in the same place the Battle of Boyacá took place.

The façade of the Alberto Castilla Music Hall of the Tolima Conservatory, located in the historic centre of Ibagué, is decorated with a stave that contains the musical notes of the national anthem. The building was built between 1932 and 1934 by architect Elí Moreno Otero and was declared a Bien de Interés Cultural (Site of Cultural Interest) by Decree 745 of 24 April 1996.

An artistic composition was the reason for a stamp in honour of the national anthem issued by the National Postal Administration in 1988 to mark the centenary of the melody.

=== Film ===
One of the first references to the national anthem in film appeared on 1 April 1937 in the film Los primeros ensayos del cine parlante nacional ("The First Rehearsals of the National Talking Cinema") produced by the Acevedo brothers, where the National Band, directed by José Rozo Contreras, performs an instrumental interpretation with the symphonic arrangements that were made official in 1946. The premiere of some first films such as Antonia Santos (1944) was accompanied by a live performance of the national anthem.

In 2006, a controversy arose due to the song "Aquí manda el patrón" ("Here the Boss Commands") that is used in the film El colombian dream, which is based on the music of the national anthem.

A short film produced by Rafael Enrique Galán, which was selected by the Ministry of Culture in a competition by the Cinematographic Development Fund in October 2009, was titled ¡Oh gloria inmarcesible!, alluding to the first verse of the national anthem. The production participated in the competition within the category of making short films.
