= History of Cartagena, Colombia =

This article describes the history of Cartagena, Colombia.

== Pre-Columbian era: 7000 BC – 1500 AD ==
The Caribbean region, particularly in the area from the Sinú River delta to the Cartagena de Indias bay, appears to be the first documented human community in today's Colombia: the Puerto Hormiga Culture.

Until the period of Spanish colonization, many indigenous cultures derived from the Karib, Malibu and Arawak language families lived along the Caribbean Colombian coast. In the late pre-Columbian era, the Sierra Nevada de Santa Marta, was home to the Tayrona people, closely related with the Chibcha family language.

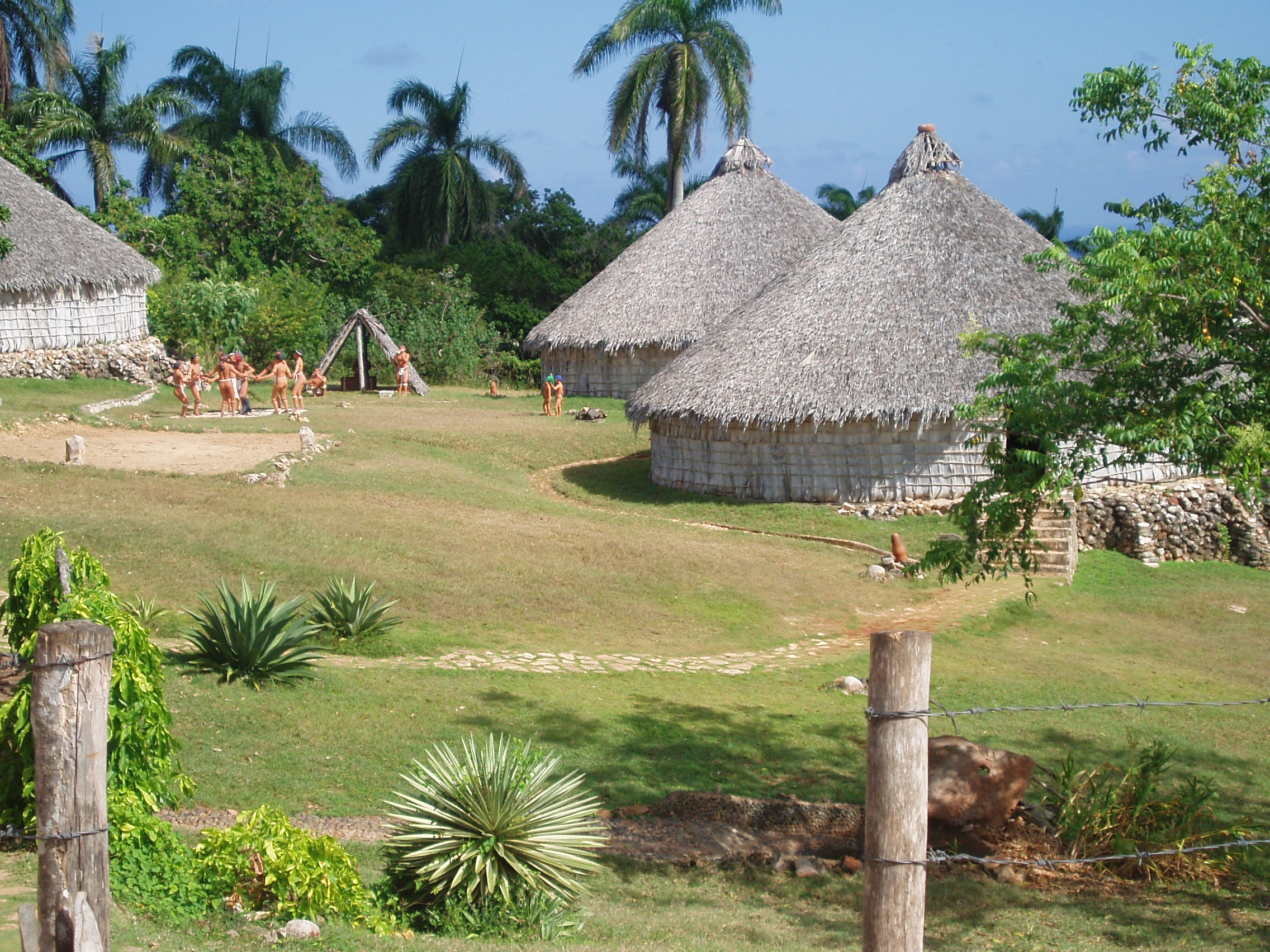
According to the chronists descriptions the huts of the prehistoric inhabitants of the actual city may looked very similar to these Taino culture huts in Cuba

Archaeologists estimate that around 7000 BC, the settlement of the formative Puerto Hormiga Culture, located near the limits between the departments of Bolívar and Sucre was established. In this area archaeologists have found the most ancient ceramic objects in the Americas, dating from around 4000 BC. The primary reason for the proliferation of primitive societies in this area is the relative mildness of climate and the abundance of wildlife which through continuous hunting allowed the inhabitants a comfortable life.

In today's villages of Maria La Baja, Sincerín, El Viso and Mahates and Rotinet, there have also been discoveries of the remains of culturally organized societies through the excavation of maloka-type buildings, which are directly related to the early Puerto Hormiga settlements.

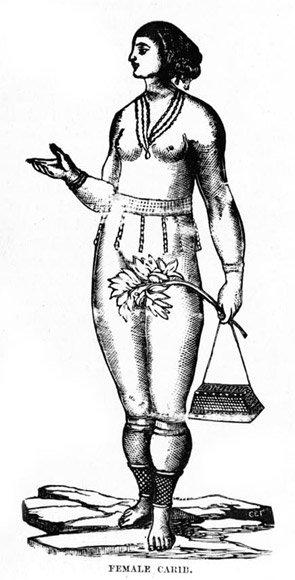
This is how a woman from the Karib Culture may have dressed

Archaeological investigations date the decline of the Puerto Hormiga culture and its related settlements to around 3000 BC. The rise of a much more developed culture, the Monsú, who lived at the end of the Dique Canal, near today's Cartagena neighborhoods Pasacaballos and Ciénaga Honda at the northernmost part of Barú Island. The Monsú culture inherited the Puerto Hormiga culture's use of the art of pottery but also developed a mixed economy of agriculture and basic manufacture. the Monsú people's diet was based mostly on seashells, sweet- and salt-water fish.

The ethnologists who discovered Monsú, Gerardo Reichel-Dolmatoff and his wife Alicia Dussan, found an interesting artificial mound created by them consisting in vases and rests of skeletons. After the first excavations, the Monsú mound was found to be a communal hut that had strong wood logs around it and was built on different levels, each one from a different period of time. The most ancient of these is the Turbana Period, from 3350 BC. This archaeological zone, less than 6 miles from Cartagena de Indias' downtown boasts the most complete collection of ceramic instruments in Colombia and the American continent. The ceramic patterns found in Monsú, are a tour de force for students of archeology of the Caribbean sea basin and northern South America.

The Reichel-Dolmatoffs later found other artificial mounds, dating from 3200 to 1000 BC, thus making the suburbs of modern Cartagena the seat of the first organized society in Colombia, and one of the most ancient in the Americas.

The development of the Sinú society in today's department of Cordoba and Sucre, eclipsed these first developments around the Cartagena Bay area. Around 1500 the area was inhabited by different tribes of the Karib language family, more precisely the Mocanae sub-family. These were:

- In the downtown island: Kalamarí Tribe
- In the Tierrabomba island: Carex Tribe
- In the Barú island, then peninsula: Bahaire Tribe
- In the eastern coast of the exterior bay: Cospique Tribe
- In the suburban area of Turbaco: Yurbaco Tribe

Some subsidiary tribes of the Kalamari lived in today's neighborhood of Pie de la Popa, and other subsidiaries from the Cospique lived in the Membrillal and Pasacaballos areas. Among these, according to the first chronicles the Kalamari Tribe had preeminence.

These tribes, though physically and administratively separated, shared common architecture, such as hut structures consisting of circular rooms with tall roofs inside wooden palisades.

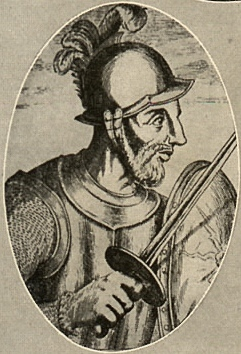
Alonso de Ojeda passed through the bay in 1505 but decided to continue to Uraba.

== First sightings: 1500–1533 ==
Since the failed foundation of San Sebastian de Urabá in 1506 by Alonso de Ojeda, and the subsequent failed city of Santa María la Antigua del Darién in 1510 by Vasco Núñez de Balboa, the southern Caribbean coast became a bit unattractive to colonizers, which preferred the more known Hispaniola and Cuba.

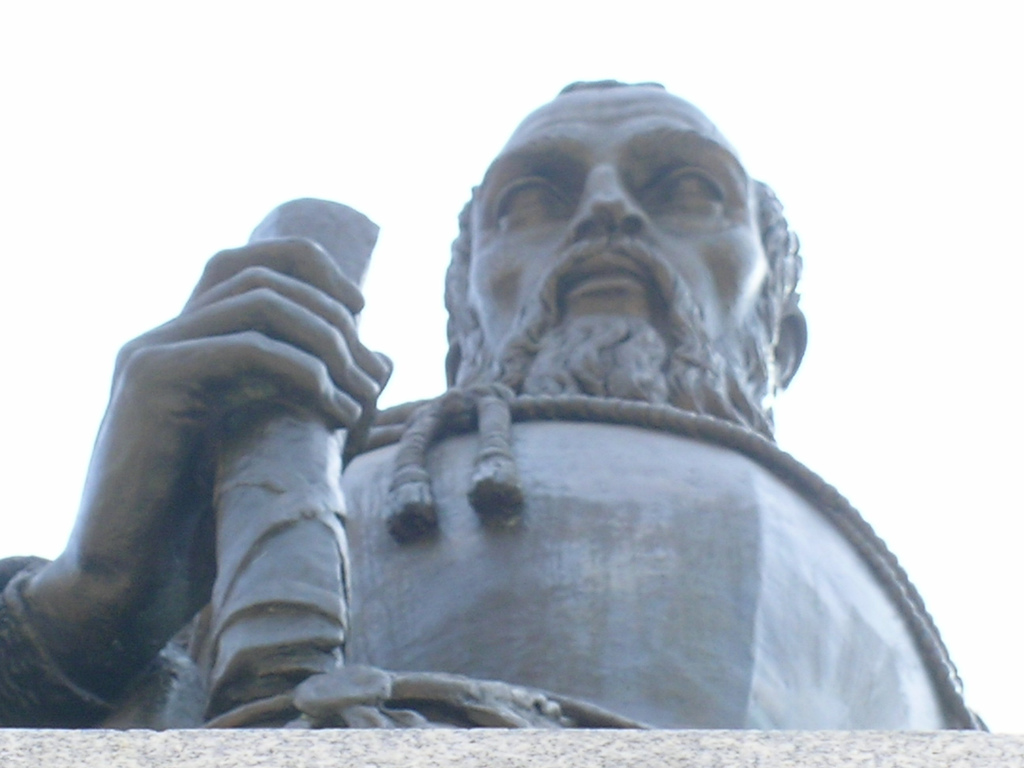
Pedro de Heredia founder of the city and explorer of its hinterland

The Casa de Contratación gave permission to Rodrigo de Bastidas (1460–1527) to again conduct an expedition as adelantado to these areas. Bastidas explored the coast and discovered the Magdalena River delta in his first journey from Guajira to the south in 1527, trip that ended in the Urabá gulf, seat of the failed first settlements. De Nicuesa and De Ojeda noted the existence of a big bay on the way from Santo Domingo to Urabá and Panama isthmus, encouraging De Bastidas to investigate.

== Colonial era: 1533–1717 ==
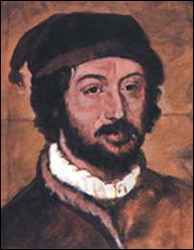
Juan de la Cosa, (1460 - killed by Indians in 1509), traveled with De Heredia to the area, and died in the near town of Turbaco in a battle, his office was to make the maps of the expedition due to his expertise after being the first cartographer of America.

Cartagena de Indias was founded on 1 June 1533 by Spanish commander Pedro de Heredia, in the former seat of the indigenous Caribbean Calamarí village. Most of Heredia's sailors were from Cartagena, Spain, a city founded by the Phoenicians in 228 BC and also a seaport. As the site had some geographical affinities with the newly discovered bay, thus they decided to name it as for their native city. See Juan de la Cosa.

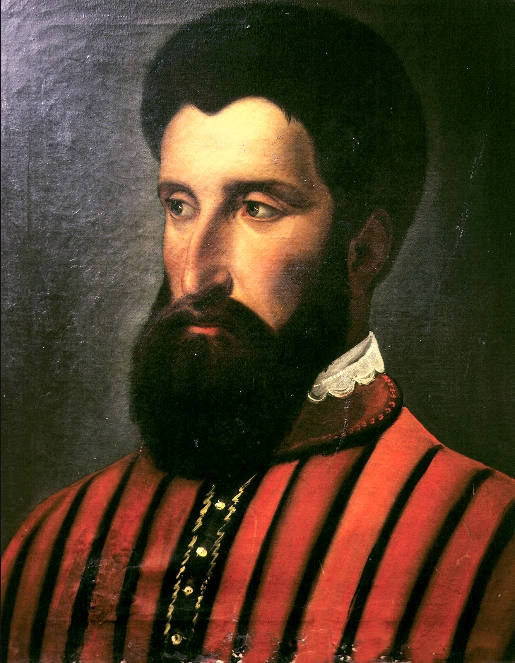
Gonzalo Jiménez de Quesada, (1495 - Bogotá now, Colombia, 1579), was the Founder of Bogotá, 1537, the actual capital of Colombia, and Governor of the City after the death in a shipwreck, in 1554, of Pedro de Heredia

Initially, life in the city was bucolic, with fewer than 2000 inhabitants and only one church. A few months after the disaster of the invasion of Cote (see below), a fire destroyed the city and forced the creation of a Firefighting Squad, the first in the Americas.

The dramatically increasing fame and wealth of the prosperous city turned it an attractive plunder site for pirates and corsairs (French privateers, licensed by their king). Just 30 years after its founding, the city was pillaged by a French Huguenot nobleman Jean-François Roberval, (circa 1500 - killed in France by a mob, 1560), known as "Robert Baal". The city then set about strengthening its defences and surrounding itself with walled compounds and castles. Martin Cote, a Basque from Biscay, soldier in Peru during the Peru Civil wars between the Spaniards, attacked years later.

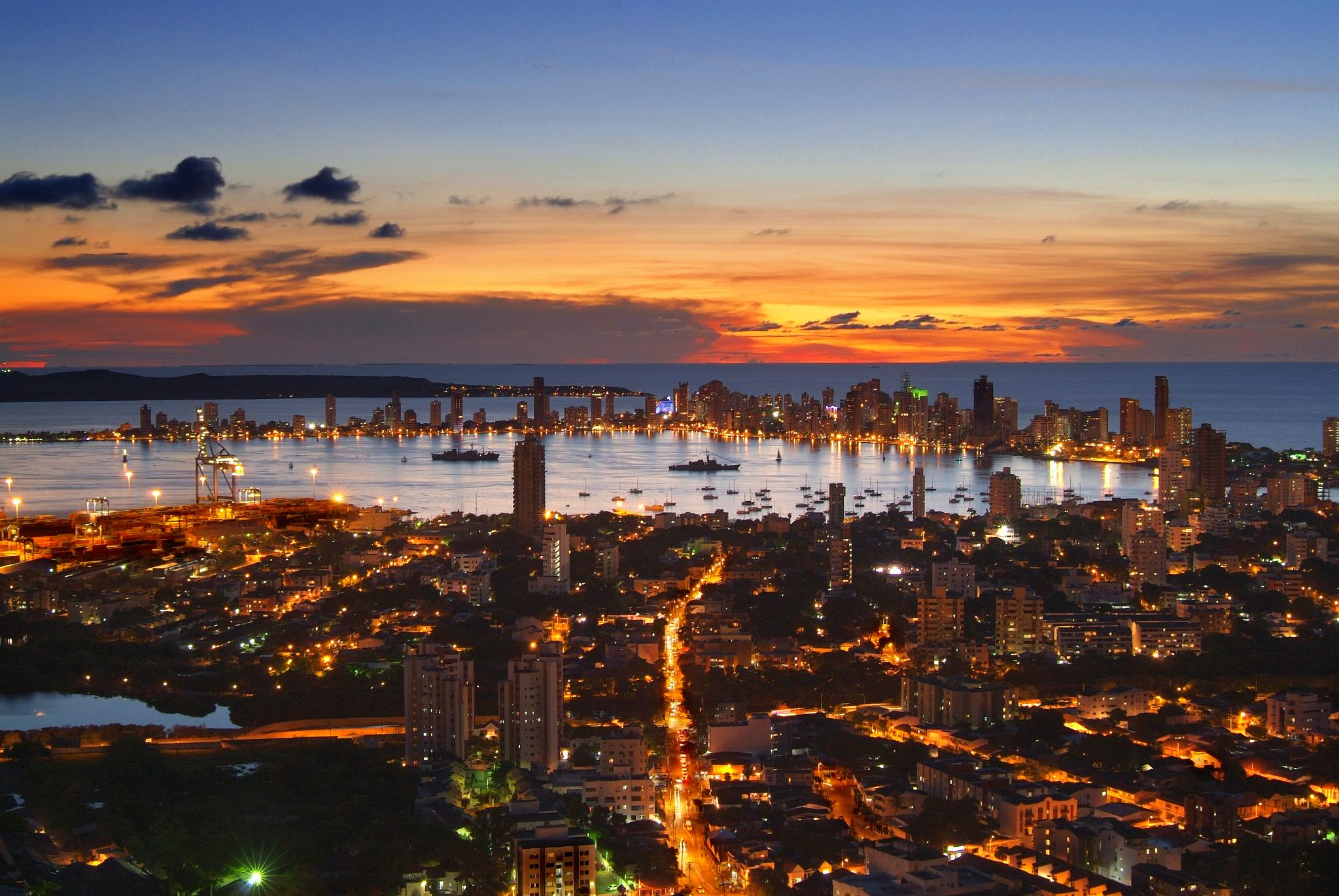
Sunset over Cartagena Harbor as seen from La Popa

Famous pirates who attacked Cartagena during the colonial era are listed below:

- Sir John Hawkins, (1532–1595): Tried to persuade Governor Martín de las Alas in 1568 to open (against the Spanish laws of the period) a foreign fair in the city to sell some goods acquired elsewhere. The Governor declined and Hawkins tried to siege but failed.
- Sir Francis Drake, (1540–1596): Nephew of Hawkins, the famed privateer came with a strong fleet and quickly took the city. The Governor circa 1574 Pedro Fernández de Busto and the Archbishop fled to the neighboring town of Turbaco and from there negotiated the costly ransom for the city: 107,000 Spanish Eight Reales of the time (Around 200 mill. of today's USD), in any case, the future "Sir" demolished 1/4 of the settlement, the developing Palace of the Township and the recently finished Cathedral. After this defeat, Spain poured millions every year to the city for its protection, beginning with Gov. Francisco de Murga's planning of the walls and forts; this practice was called "Situado". The magnitude of this subsidy is shown by comparison: between 1751 and 1810, the city received the sum of 20,912,677 Spanish reales, the equivalent of some 2 trillion dollars today.
- Sir Bernard Desjean, Baron de Pointis, (1645–1707), Jean du Casse 1697. The Raid on Cartagena occurred. The city recovered quickly from the brief takeover of Drake and kept expanding. The port now became the seat of the Inquisition in the Caribbean (with Lima's and Mexico's the only 3 seats in America), many public buildings and servants, its importance was confirmed. Desjean's plans were far more than pillage: it was an invasion by all means. King Louis XIV, whose mother was a Spanish Habsburg Royal princess, whose son was also the son of a Spanish Habsburg Princess wanted his grandson Felipe V to assert his rights to take over the exhausted, no male succession, Spanish Habsburgs throne and Cartagena de Indias could help significantly if taken "manu military", too.

The political vision behind this invasion was shadowed by the governor of Saint-Domingue (today's Haiti) Jean Baptiste Ducasse who brought his soldiers just to steal, the original plan ending as pirates and thieves again destroying the city. In any case, the entry wasn't easy, because of the recently finished first stage of walls and forts which slowed and made costly the victory. While Desjean only asked for 250,000 Spanish reales in ransom, Jean du Casse stayed a few months later and dishonored the promise of the Baron of respecting the churches and holy places and left them with nothing. The city again, lost everything. The 18th century begins.

Other important events in the 16th and 17th centuries were:

16th century:

- The brother of the founder, Pedro de Heredia, Alonso de Heredia founded Santa Cruz de Mompox to honour the then governor of the province, José de Santacruz who was about to make another unjust Residencia, sort of appointment, to his brother, planned by his enemies in the city. Residencia project was successfully overcome by Heredia who later "residenced" Santacruz for his greed in the expedition made by him to Urabá in late 1537.
- In its typical decentralised and autonomistic state policy, Spain put in Cartagena de Indias, a most interesting seafaring town, many administrative offices:

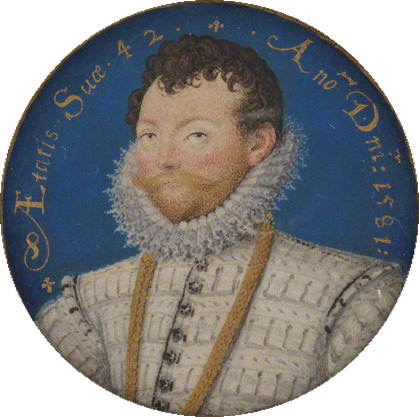
Francis Drake entered in the city after the failure of his uncle Hawkins and sacked the nascent colony

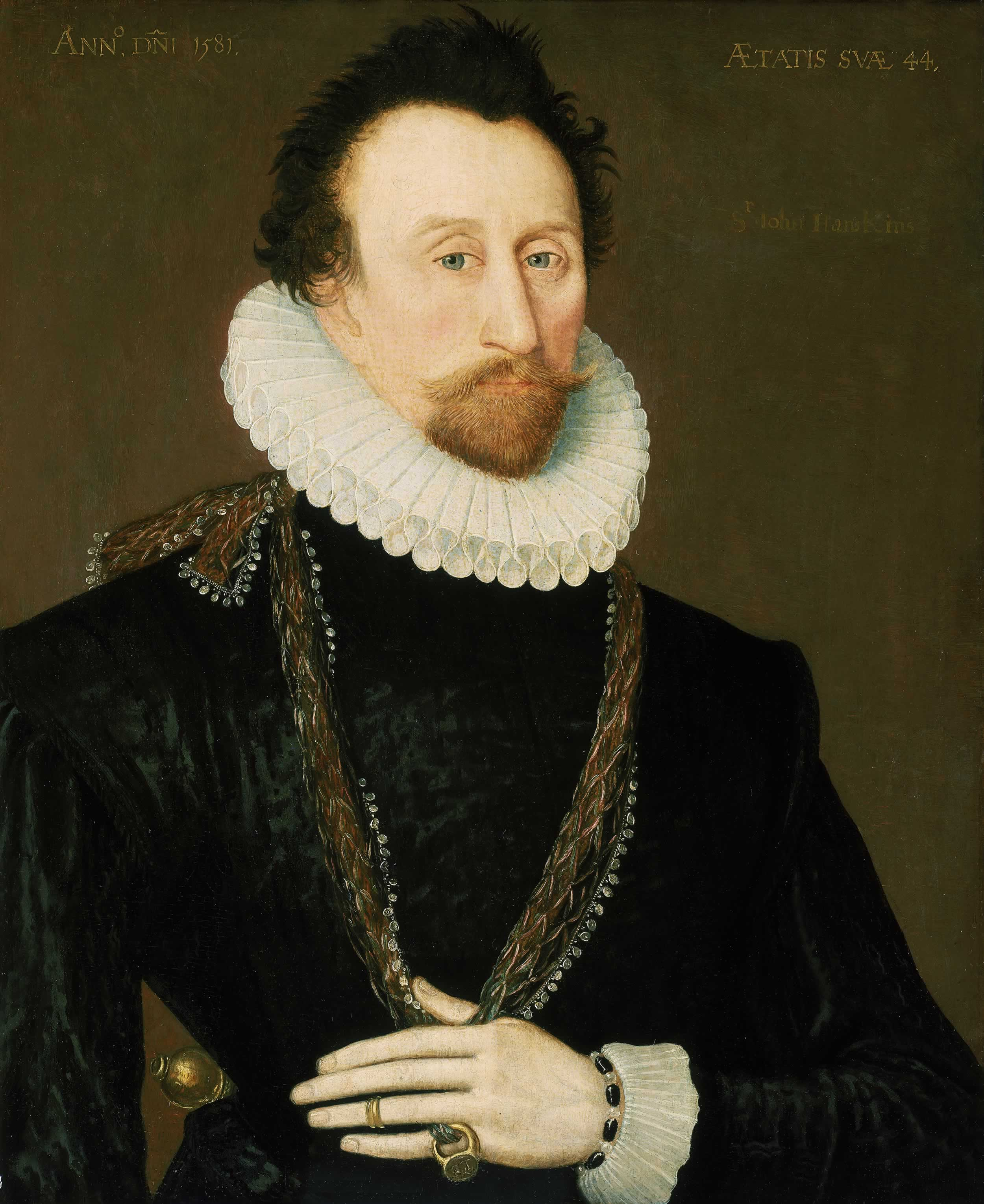
Privateer John Hawkins failed to capture the city in 1568

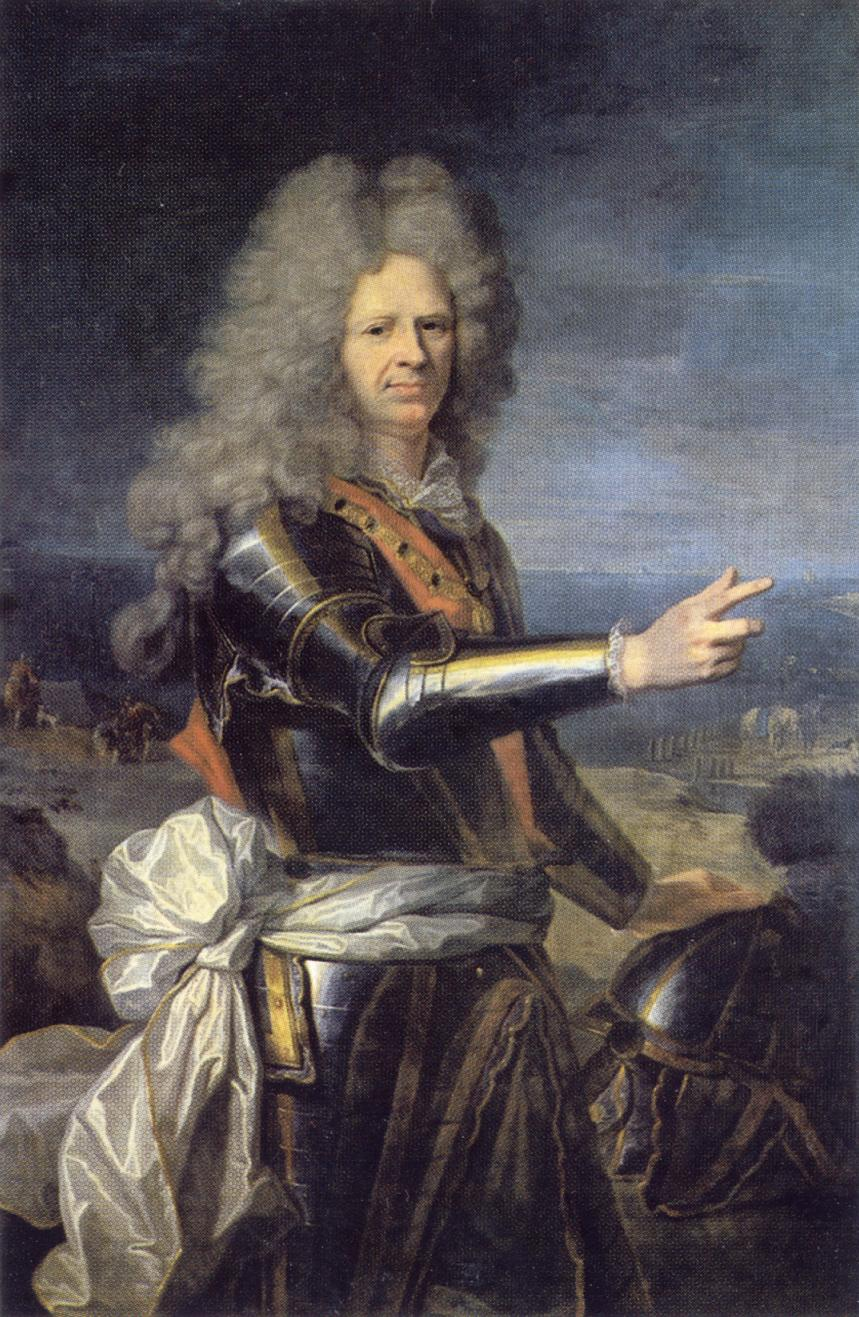
Jean Baptiste du Casse and his brigands damaged the military invasion of New Granada of Louis XIV under the Baron of Pointis by ravaging the city and turning into pirates.

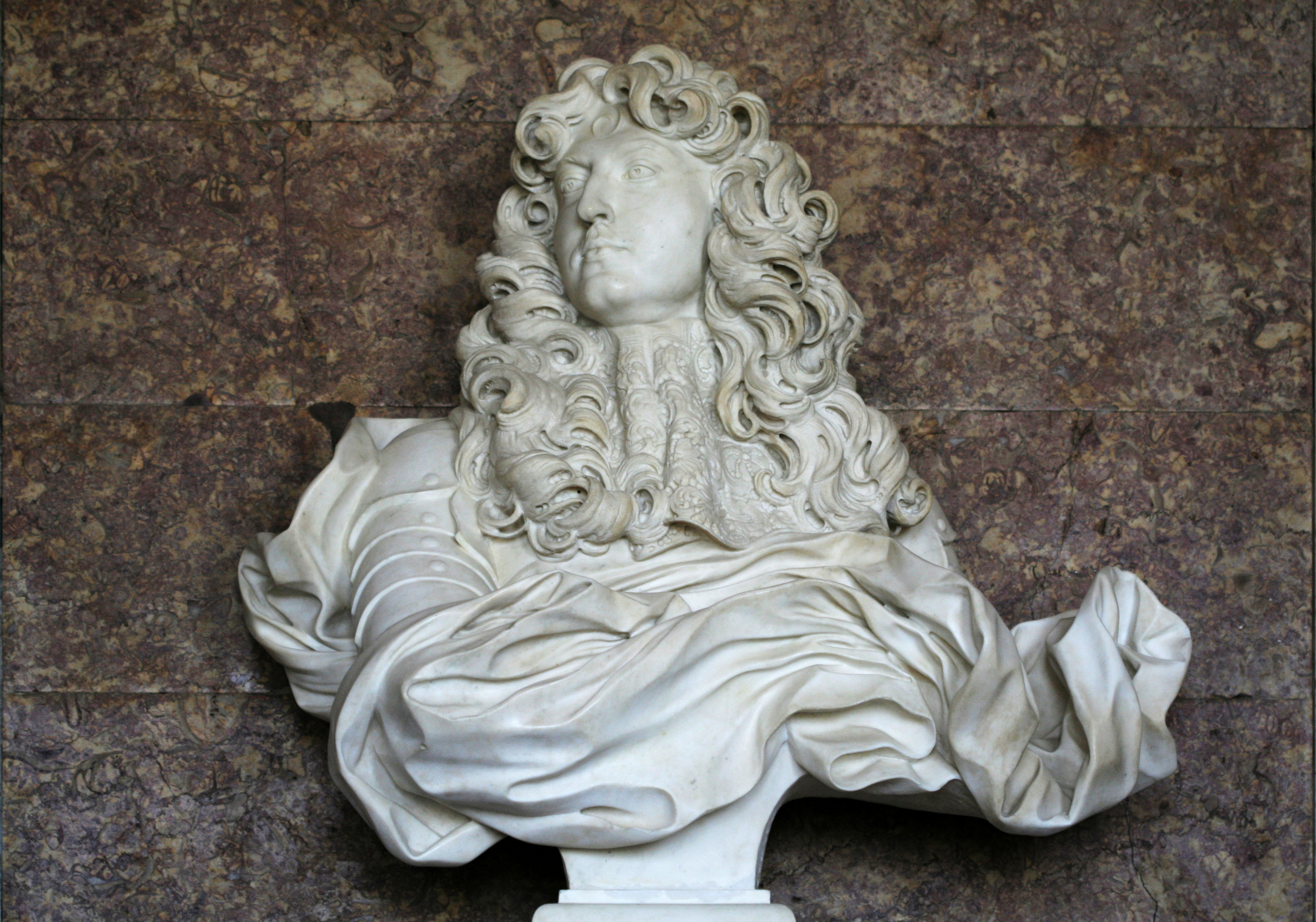
King of France, Louis XIV, deceased 1715, dreamed with taking over the city and invade the New Granada territories, now Colombia, but failed.

1. The Royal Houses of Customs, "La Aduana": Technically the Main directorate for Customs policy in New Granada and its dependencies. Cartagena de Indias's mayors office today is now located there.
2. The Royal Houses of Accountance: Most of its competences were in the State Finance area, making it analogous to a Ministry of Finance or a Secretary of the Treasury. This office was located in what is today Mapfre's House at La Inquisicion Street.
3. The Royal Mail House: Although dealing already in 1540 it became developed in the 18th century, staying there till 1821 when it was renamed with the Independence, delivering most of the post in New Granada and to Europe. Today's SUDEB's house occupies its original place.
4. The Royal Consulate of Commerce of Cartagena de Indias: A privately run institution with public charter, the Consulates of Commerce were express courts for trading quarrels and to promote trade and development in its area. Until 1790 was the only in the area, then succeeded by Caracas (1790), Santa Cruz de Mompox (1793), Panama (1798), Santa Fe (1805) and others.
5. The sea farers Hospital: First and Only military hospital in the area, and until the foundation of the San Juan De Dios Hospital in Bogotá the only in New Granada. On its first floor a Poor People's Hospital worked until the San Carlos Hospital in 1730 and the Poors Hospital were opened up in the Santa Clara convent. Today's Naval Museum, with the poor's Hospital in its first floor for a while, they were replaced by those on Gastelbondo Street (San Carlos), and today's Sofitel Santa Clara Hotel, formerly the "Poors Hospital of Santa Clara of Assisi".
6. Headquarters of the Royal Regular Armies of Cartagena de Indias: In New Granada, like in most Spanish America, military presence was at least nule and when present was quite concentrated in the important towns : Havana, Mexico City, Lima, Panama and Cartagena de Indias. The permanent army post in New Granada had its headquarters in today's Judges Offices in Cuartel Street. This made Cartagena de Indias also the seat to something similar to a Ministry of Defense in a modern country.

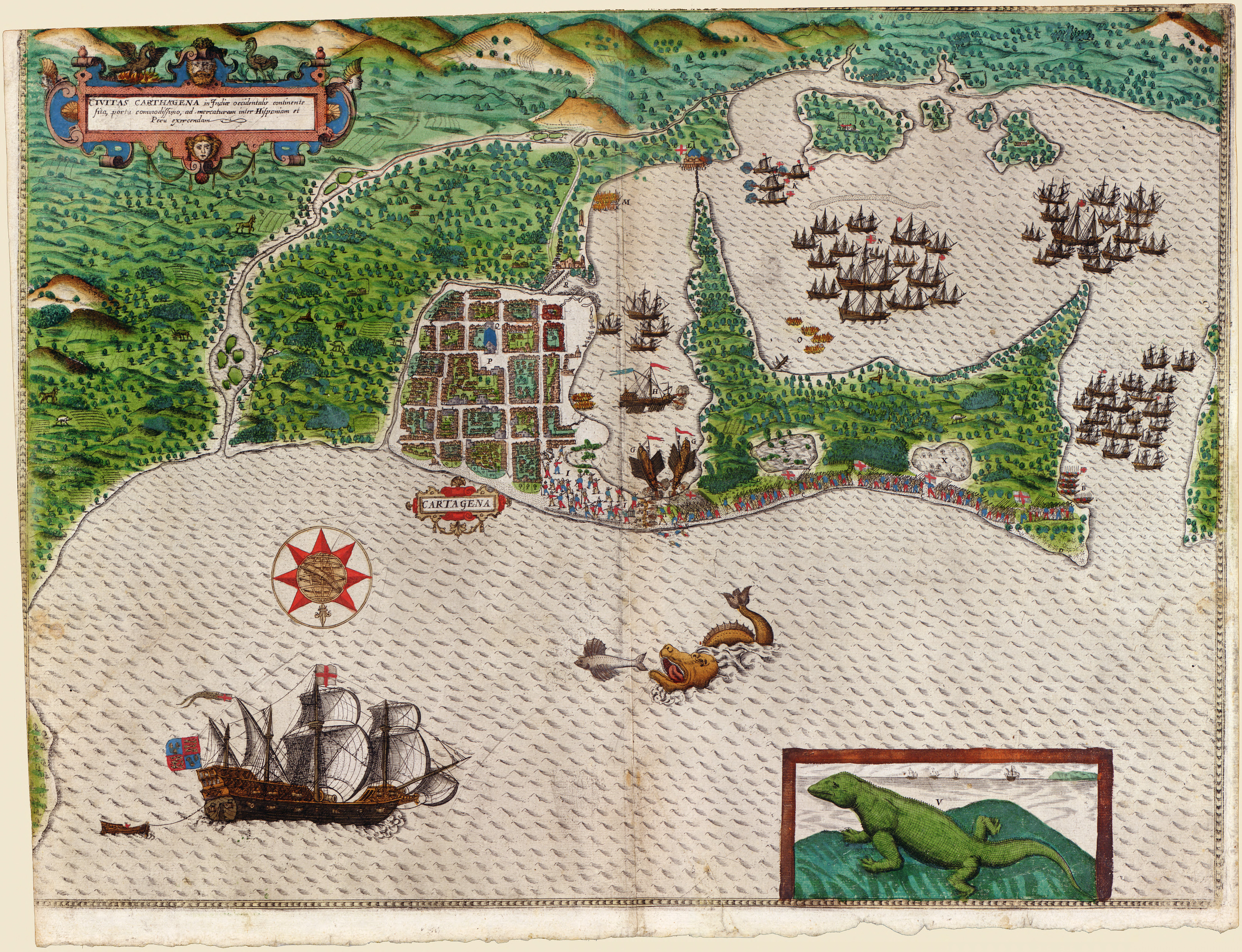
Map of the city recently established and without walls. c. 1550

17th century:

- During the governorship of Rafael Cápsir an interesting event occurred in the city: the "Cessatio a Divinis". The nuns of the Santa Clara convent, on becoming richer than their supervising male tutors, the Franciscan friars, wished to become independent of them and of their financial advice. The Archbishop agreed with the petition of the nuns but the Franciscans protested and made an alliance with the Governor, who decided to storm the Convent, but found that the Archbishop had previously forbidden the Franciscans from saying mass (Cessatio a Divinis). The nuns then thought it wise to reverse their petition but the Archbishop, already involved, preferred to continue.

It is said that the city was terribly distressed by the conflict, with daily fights in the streets taking place between citizens allying with opposing factions . The conflict finally ended not only with the Franciscans being deprived of financially tutoring the nuns but also with the Archbishop being banned.

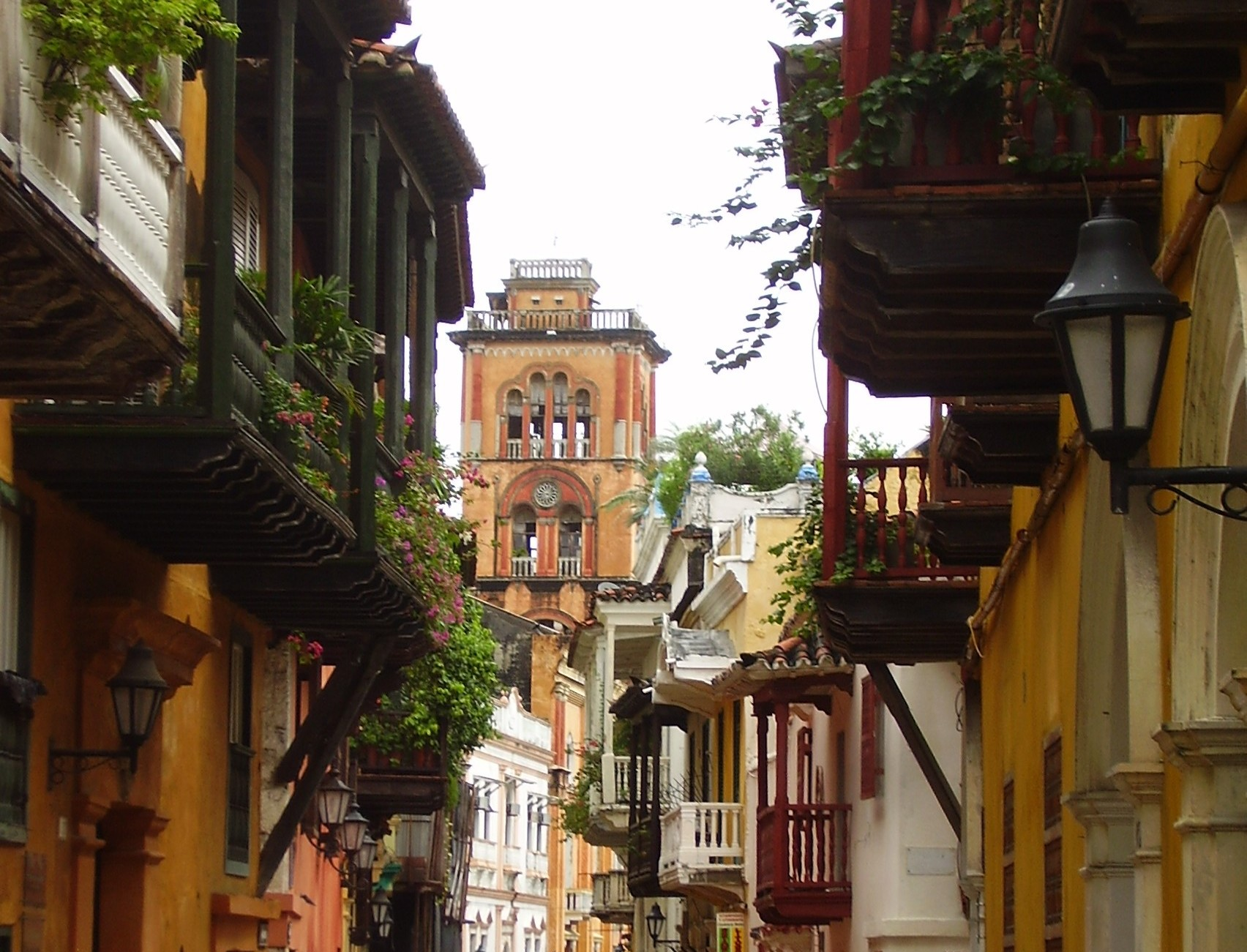
Cartagena de Indias San Agustín Street

- The Portuguese Company of Cacheu, dedicated to slave trading was closed down by the Crown because of reported frauds and tax money embezzlement. This slave trading company was located opposite today's Marquis de Valdehoyos house (Calle de la Factoría).
- Jesuit father Pedro Claver y Corberó, (Verdú, Catalonia, 8 September 1580 – Cartagena de Indias, Colombia, 9 September 1654), today known as a Saint of the Roman Catholic Church, (since 1888, by Pope Leo XIII), and "The slave of the black slaves" departed after numerous requests, in 1622, to the strategic harbor of Cartagena de Indias. There he met and worked together with Jesuit father Alonso de Sandoval, the author of probably the most influential book, De instauranda ethiopum salute, two improved editions in Spanish during the 17th century and other later editions in Spanish, on black people ethnology, black African people and African black slaves sold there and brought from West Occidental Africa.
- The Township Palace and Governors House was finished.

The fame of this prosperous city turned it into the plunder site for pirates and thieves; the legions for the country's defence soon became insufficient, which is why the kings of Spain decided to approve the construction of castles, forts, and walls that surrounded the city.

During the 17th century, the Spanish Crown hired the services of prominent European military engineers to carry out the construction of fortresses, which are nowadays one of Cartagena's clearest signs of identity. Engineering works took well over 208 years, and ended with some eleven kilometres of walls surrounding the city, namely, the Castillo San Felipe de Barajas, named in honor of Spain's King Philip IV. It was built during the Governorship of Pedro Zapata de Mendoza, Marquis of Barajas, and was constructed to repel land attacks, equipped with sentry boxes, buildings for food and weapons storage, tunnels.

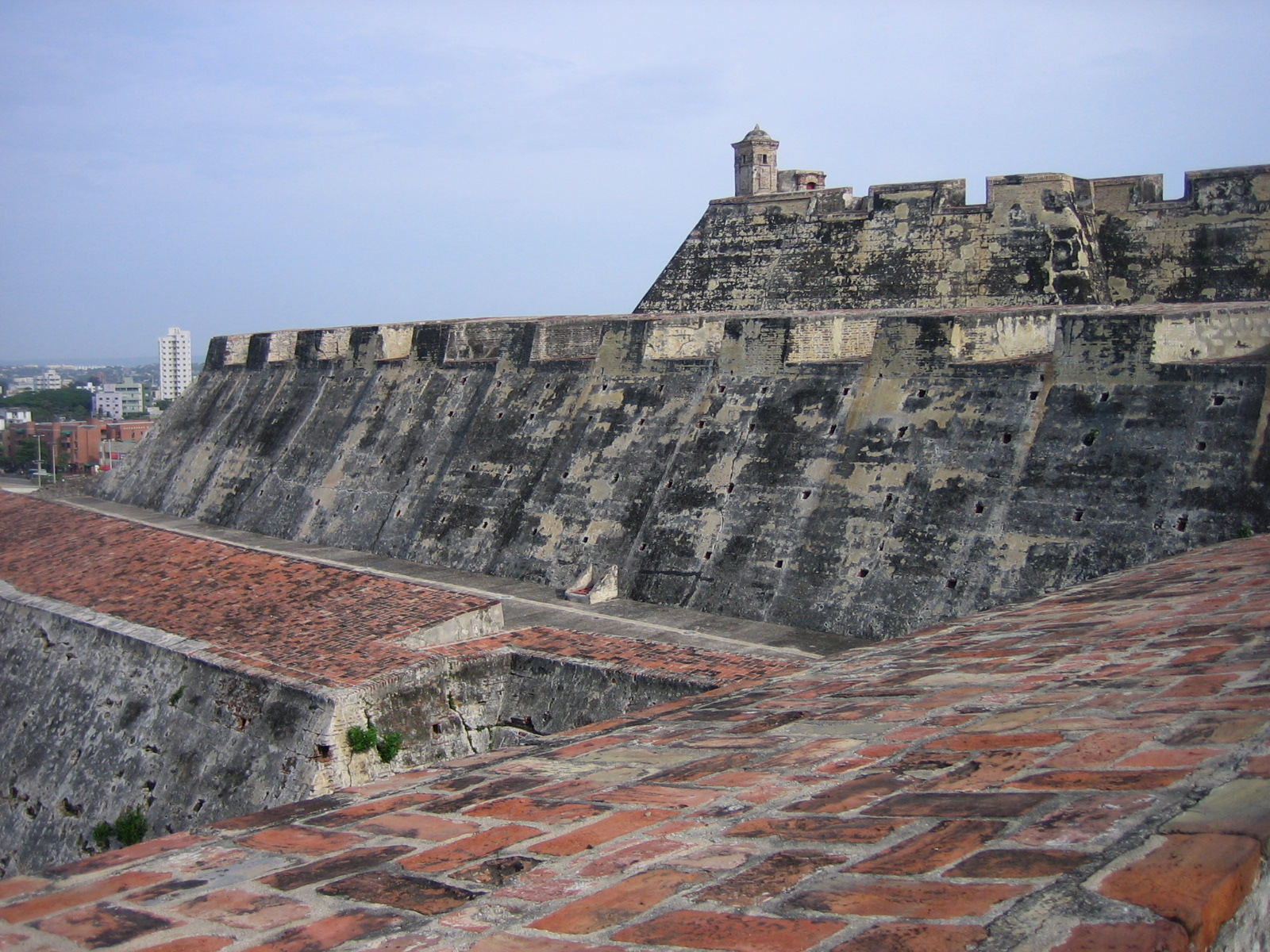
A part of the 16th and 17th century Fortress of San Felipe de Barajas, Cartagena de Indias, now a city of Colombia

This powerful military complex was completed with:

1. The San Sebastián del Pastelillo Fort: in today's neighborhood of Manga. It is called del Pastelillo (the cupcake) because of its low altitude to avoid being affected by the cannons of the Castle of San Felipe which may have destroyed it if made taller. The fort replaced the first defense of the city, The Tower of Boquerón, a dominating tower similar to the Torre del Homenaje in Santo Domingo, but round.
2. The Santa Cruz de Castillogrande Fort: in today's neighborhood of Castillogrande, near today's Naval Club, a cross shaped fort which controlled the entry in the inner bay.
3. The San Juan de Manzanillo Fort: smaller than its counterpart, Castillogrande, in order to avoid crossfiring it, but on the opposite side of the strait.
4. The San Luis de Bocachica Fort: Beautifully finished cross-shaped fort, an exponent of the renaissance military architecture. Alone, it dominated the Bocachica strait which lead to the ocean but was destroyed by Admiral Edward Vernon in the 18th century, circa 1741, during his failed attempt at conquering Cartagena de Indias. Only some remains can be seen at some places of Bocachica, near its successor, built after 1741, the San Fernando Fort.
5. The San Fernando de Bocachica Fort: Built nearer to the sea than its older brother, the San Luis, it was more modern and state-of-the-art, being more roundly shaped, with space for more musketeers rather than massive cannons, and far more neoclassical and delicate in its outer layers, revealing the tendency in military architecture in the 18th century.
6. The San José de Bocachica batteries: Built with the new plan of the San Fernando Fort, was designed to point to the line of flotation of the ships, and that's why its almost under sea level.
7. The Angel San Rafael Battery: A masterpiece of the history of military architecture, it's the only exponent in the world of "inside defense". The battery has few cannons to the outside, only those necessary to support the defense of San Fernando. Its use was to attract the sieging forces to enter a tunnel that appears to be accidentally opened 500 meters away from the fort. The idea behind it was to let invaders think it was easier to siege the castle of San Fernando than it actually was.
  At the end of the tunnel opens on to a moat inside the battery where more than 400 muskets were located, pointing at the first entrance. The design of the "devil holes" where the muskets were placed, could not be seen by the invaders, who were then trapped then in a lethal ground . Although no one seems to have experienced this deadly trap, tests done with cattle in the late 18th century confirmed the usefulness of the idea. Recently the Battery, a crown jewel of military architectural history, was rebuilt after years of neglect.
8. The Santa Barbara Battery: Designed near the tunnel entrance to Angel San Rafael was a small battery used as a decoy to support fire to the Bocachica system. Its most important function was to attract the sieging forces to the mainland so they could glimpse the tunnel entrance and be fired at in Angel San Rafael deadly moat. The Santa Barbara battery disappeared over the years and today only its founding stones remain above the sea.
9. The Batteries of Chamba and Santiago: Mainly designed as support batteries for San Luis fort, these were razed down by Admiral Edward Vernon in 1741. The ruins of both batteries remain near the shore of the Tierrabomba Island, but no plans exist to rebuild them.
10. The Batteries of Mas, Crespo and the Revellín of El Cabrero: Destroyed by erosion and the desperate efforts of the 19th century administrations to dynamize the city's building industry were support forts for the massive San Lucas and Santa Catalina fortresses in the city walls.
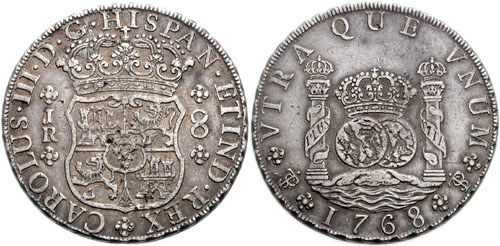
  Crates and crates of these Spanish reales dwelled in Cartagena de Indias to be distributed throughout the empire.
11. The walls of the old city. 11 km of walls, more than 20 mini forts within it, 4 auxiliary doors, only one bridge-fort to connect the city to the mainland.

Explanations are unnecessary. When the defenses were finished in 1756, the city was simply impossible to take over. There is a legend, that when reviewing the costs of the defenses of Spain in Havana and Cartagena de Indias, in an effort to reform the chronic spending of his predecessors, Charles III of Spain, in his famed ironic style said while in Madrid, Spain, after taking his spyglass: "This is outrageous! For this price those castles should be seen from here!"

Cartagena was a major trading port, especially for precious metals. Gold and silver from the mines in New Granada and Peru were loaded in Cartagena on the galleons bound for Spain via Havana. Cartagena was also a slave port; Cartagena and Veracruz (Mexico) were the only cities authorized to trade with black people. The first slaves arrived with Pedro de Heredia and they worked as cane cutters to open roads, in the desecration of tombs of the aboriginal population of Sinú, and in the construction of buildings and fortresses. The agents of the Portuguese company Cacheu distributed human 'cargos' from Cartagena for mine exploitation in Venezuela, the West Indies, the Nuevo Reino de Granada and the Viceroyalty of Perú.

On 5 February 1610, the Catholic Monarchs established from Spain the Inquisition Holy Office Court in Cartagena de Indias by a Royal Decree issued by King Philip III. The Inquisition Palace, finished in 1770, is still there with its original features of colonial times. When Cartagena declared its complete independence from Spain on November 11, 1811, the inquisitors were urged to leave the city. The Inquisition operated again after the Reconquest in 1815, but it disappeared definitely when Spain surrendered six years later before the patriotic troops led by Simón Bolívar.

== Viceregal era: 1717–1810 ==
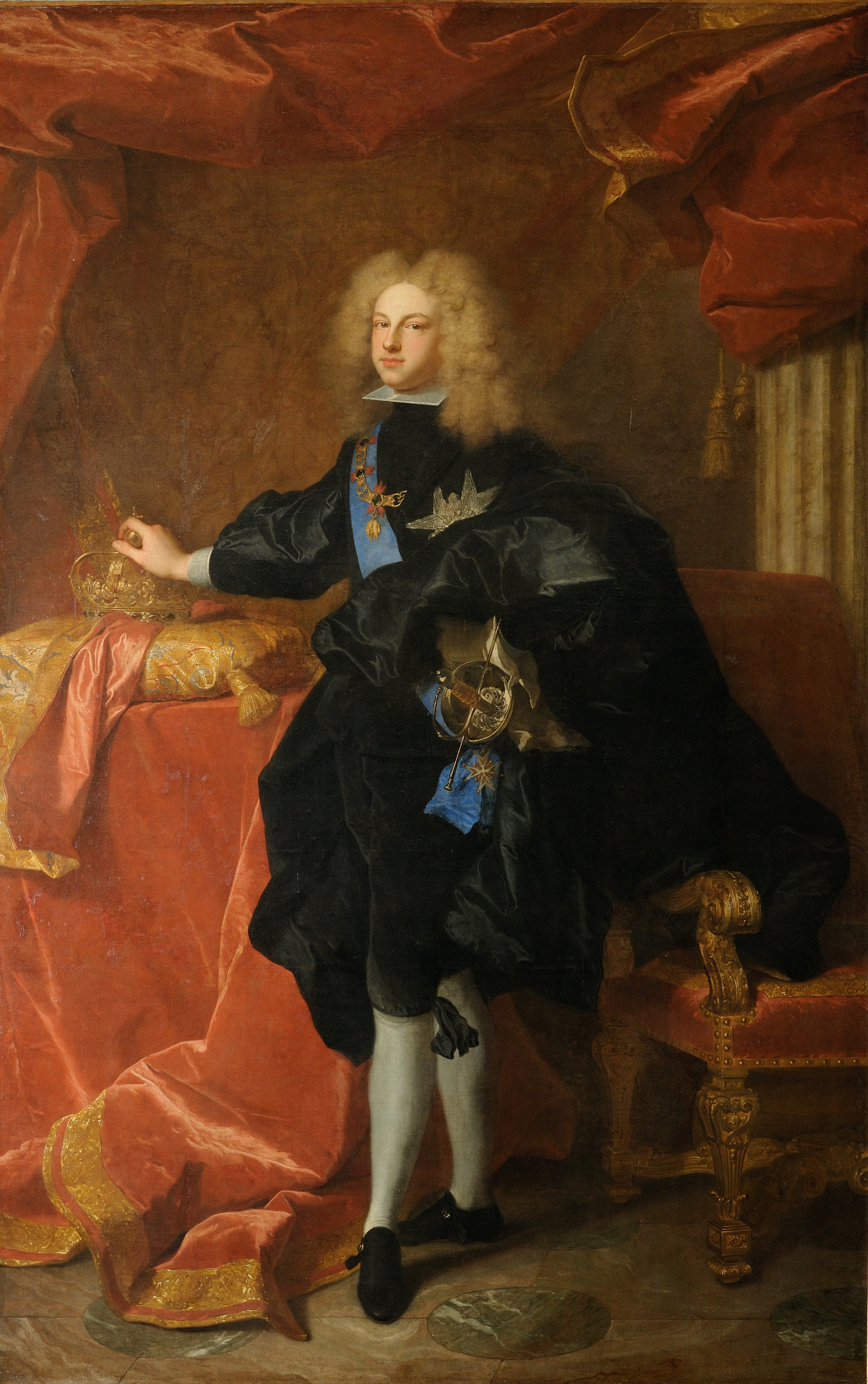
The pro-trade, administrative reforms and deregulation economic policies of the new Bourbon Dynasty in Spain stimulated the economic growth and consolidation of the Spanish America. Here, the first Bourbon Spanish monarch, Philip V.

Although the 18th century began very badly for the city, soon the downward tendency was curbed. The pro-trade economic policies of the new dynasty in Madrid bolstered the economic performance of Cartagena de Indias and the establishment of the Viceroyalty of the New Granada in 1717 had the city as the greatest beneficiary of the colony.

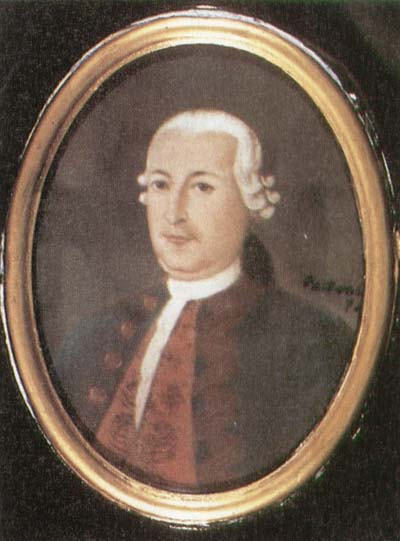
Juan Díaz de Torrezar Pimienta as governor was the mastermind of the reconstruction of the city after the destruction of 1697.

The reconstruction after the Raid on Cartagena (1697) was initially slow, but with the ending of the War of the Spanish Succession around 1711 and the competent administration of D. Juan Diaz de Torrezar Pimienta the walls were rebuilt, the forts reorganized and restored and the public services and buildings reopened. By 1710, the city was fully recovered. At the same time, the slow but steady reforms of the restricted trade policies in the Spanish Empire encouraged the establishment of new trade houses and private projects. During the reign of Philip V of Spain the city had many new public works starting or ending like the new fort of San Fernando, the Hospital of the Obra Pía and the full paving of all the streets and the opening of new roads.

== Battle of Cartagena de Indias ==
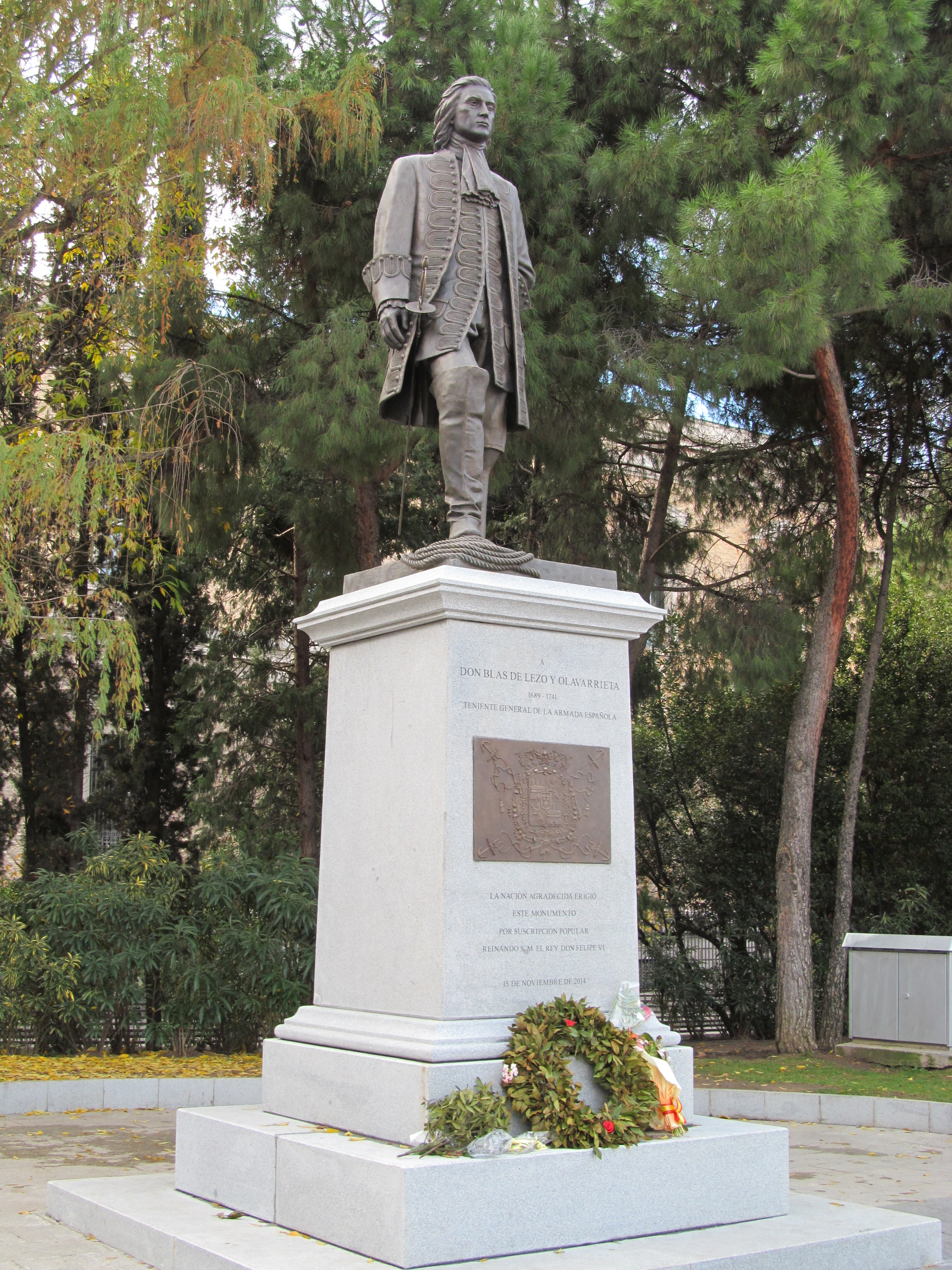
Blas de Lezo the Spanish sea farer, with only one eye, one leg and one hand, was one of the military leaders that defended the city from Admiral Vernon in 1741

In March 1741 the city endured a large-scale attack by British and American colonial troops led by Admiral Edward Vernon, (1684–1757), who arrived at Cartagena with a massive fleet of 186 ships and 23,600 men, including 12,000 infantry, against only 6 Spanish ships and less than 6,000 men, in an action known as the Battle of Cartagena de Indias. The siege was broken off due to the start of the tropical rainy season, after weeks of intense fighting in which the British landing party was successfully repelled by the Spanish forces led by commander General Blas de Lezo y Olavarrieta, (1689 - aftermaths of the Cartagena battle, 1741), a Basque from the Gipuzkoa lands, (Spain).

Heavy British casualties were compounded by diseases such as yellow fever. This victory prolonged Spain's control of the Caribbean waters, which helped secure its large Empire until the 19th century. Admiral Vernon was accompanied by American Colonial troops, including George Washington's brother, Lawrence Washington, who was so impressed with Vernon he named his Mount Vernon agricultural estate after him.

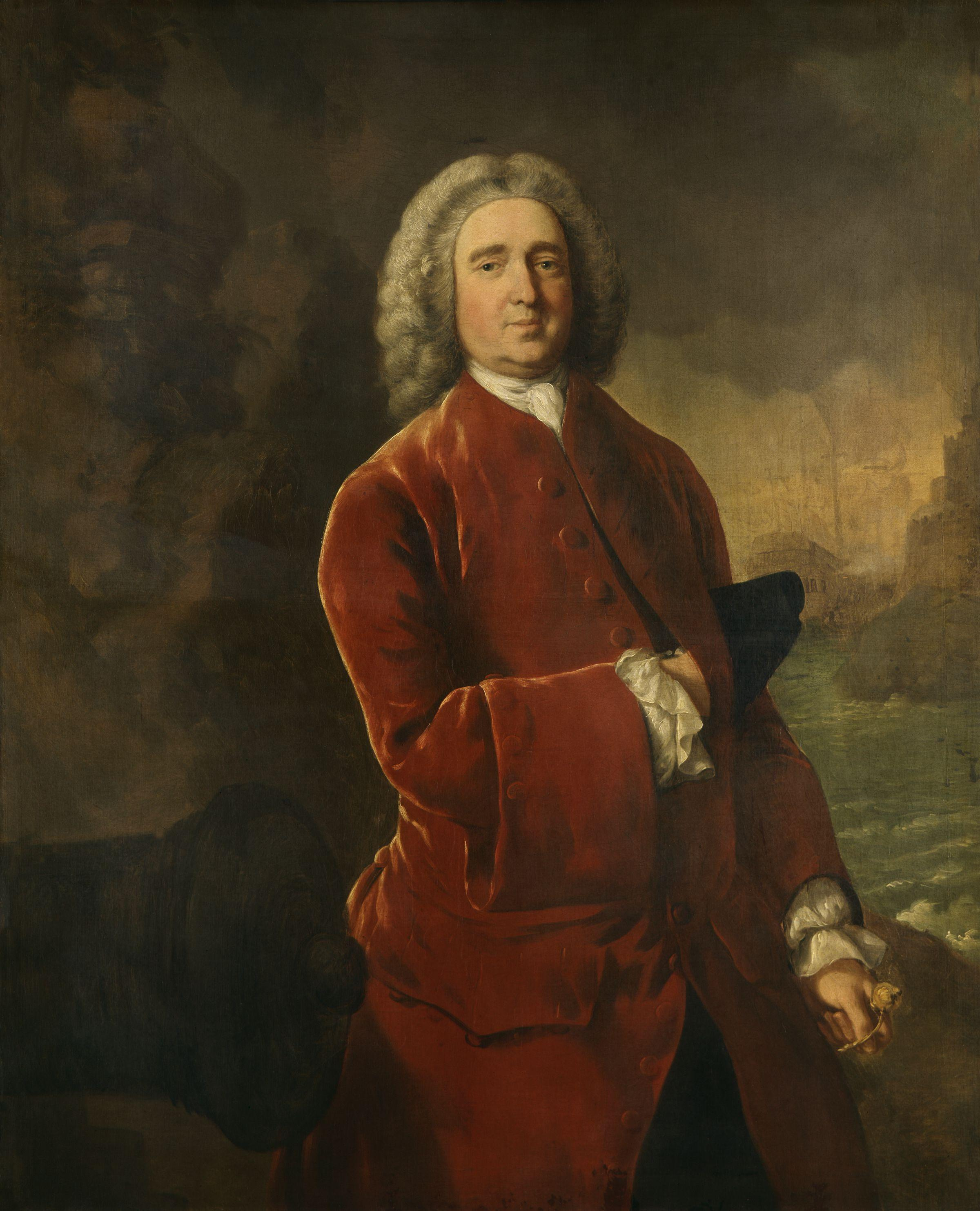
The final serious attempt to take the city and invade New Granada was made by Edward Vernon, who failed in one of the biggest military expeditions ever made there

== From Bogotá to Cartagena ==
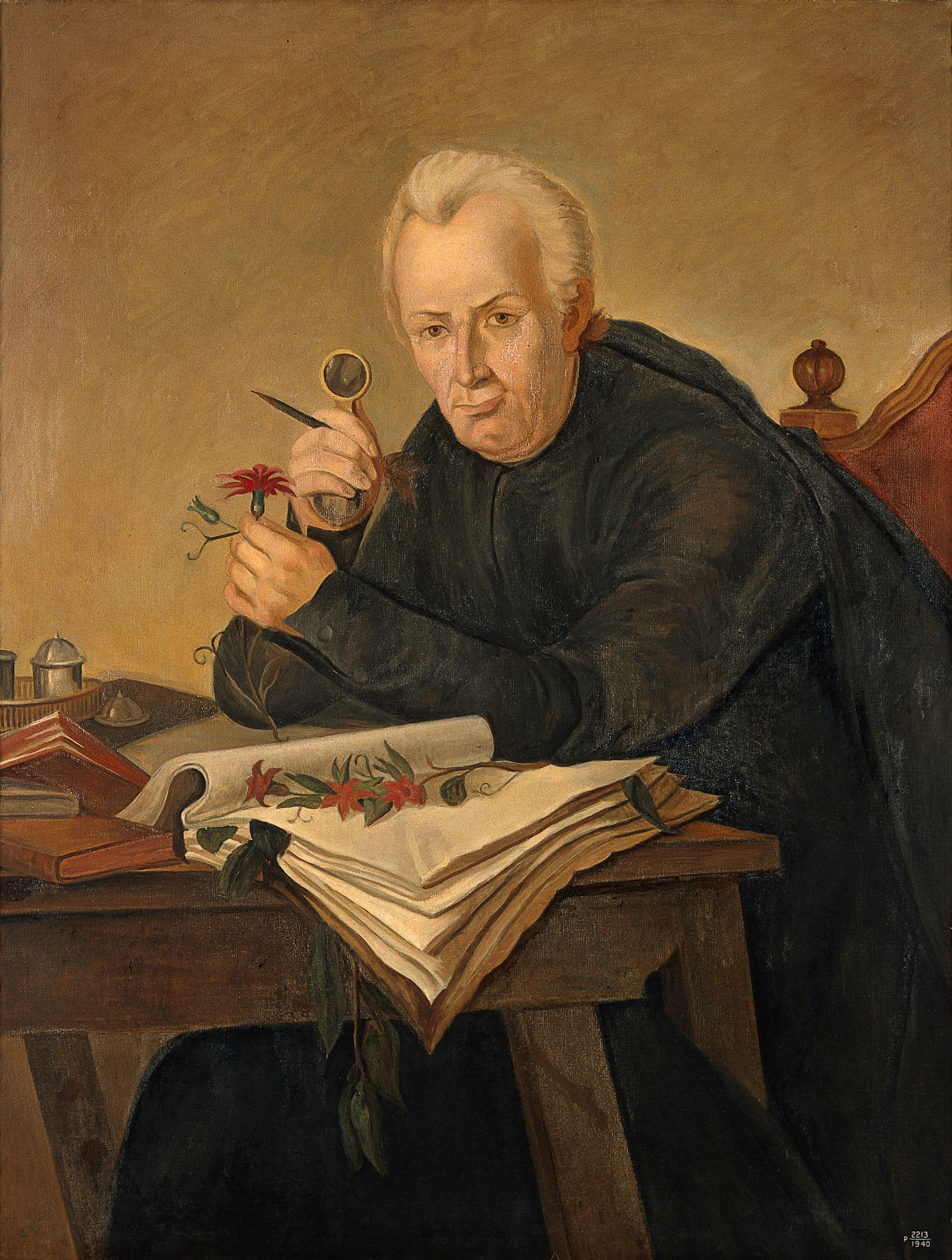
José Celestino Mutis lived in the city and collected and classified many plants

After Vernon began what is called the 'Silver Age' of the city (1750–1808). This time was of permanent expansion of the existing buildings, massive immigration from all the other cities of the Viceroyalty, the increase of the economic and political power of the city and a population spur that hasn't been seen yet again. For these events, the political power that was already shifting from Bogotá to the coast, definitely did and the Viceroys decided to reside in the city for good. The inhabitants of the city were the richest of the colony, the aristocracy formed noble houses with their land estates, libraries and prints were opened, and even the first café in New Granada was established. These good times of steady progress and advance of the second half of the 18th century came into an abrupt end in 1808, with the general crisis of the Spanish Empire, embodied in the Mutiny of Aranjuez, with all its consequences.

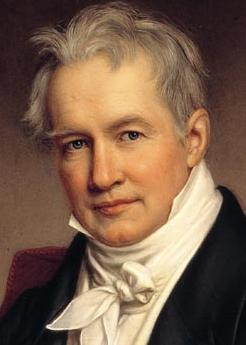
Alexander Von Humboldt stayed in the city in the early 1800s together with French naturalist Bonpland and saw the closure of the Silver Age

For more than 275 years, Cartagena was part of the Spanish Crown. On November 11, 1811, Cartagena declared its independence.

== 19th century ==
If there is a word to describe the Cartagena in the 19th century, is by far: decadence. Followed by instability, revolution, impoverishment and depopulation. The chaos brought by the Mutiny of Aranjuez to the Empire and the French invasion of the peninsula put the stability of the Spanish ancient regime in shambles. Although there were two years of grace for the city to prepare itself for what was coming.

In 1815, the city was besieged by the Spanish for 105 days and lost 6,000 inhabitants to famine and disease.
It remained under Spanish control for 6 years, until it was retaken by the Patriots on 10 October 1821.

== See also ==
- Timeline of Cartagena, Colombia
