= Marginea =

- Commune
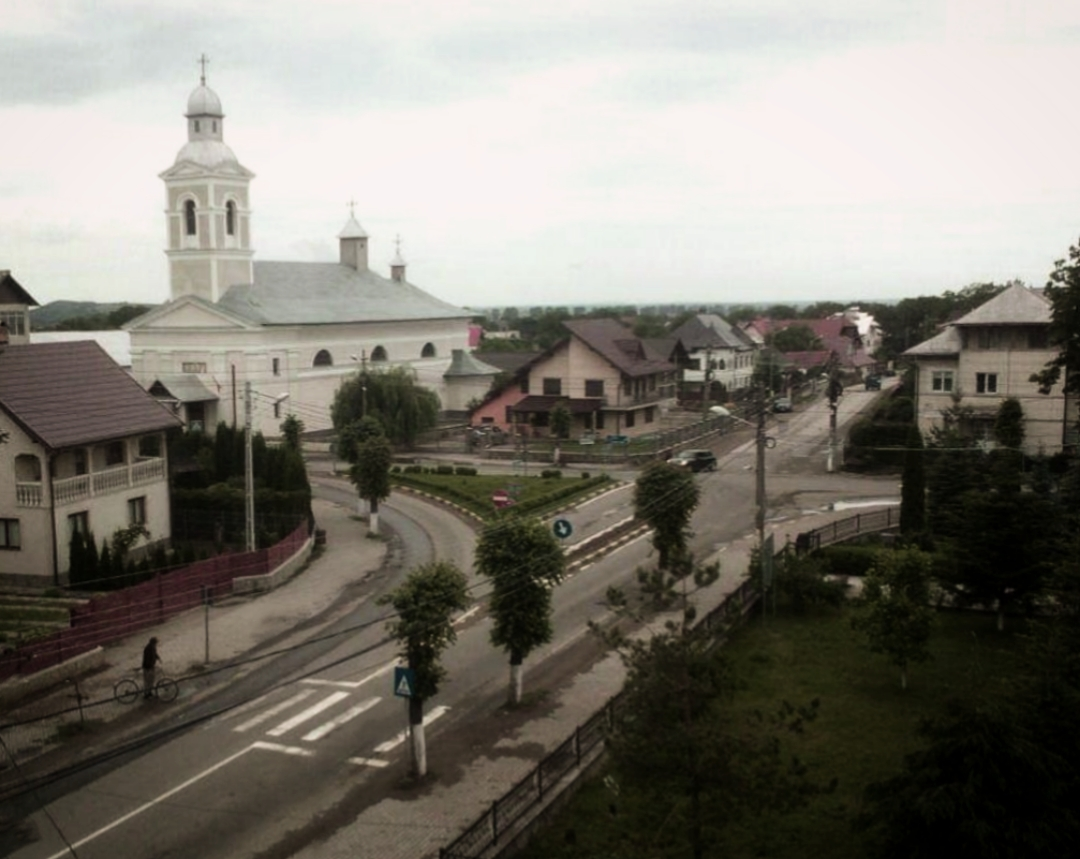
- Marginea in 2015

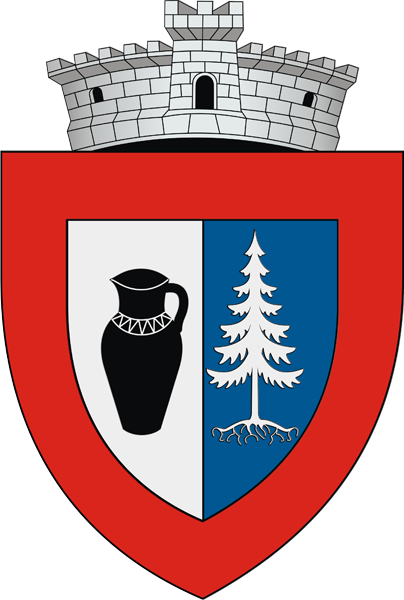
- Coat of arms

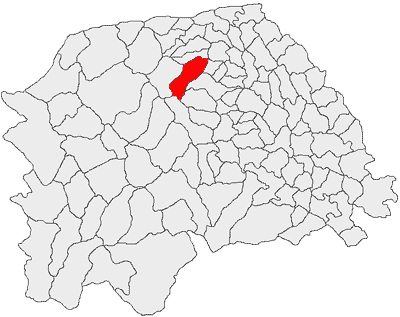
- Location in Suceava County

- Location in Romania
- Coordinates: 47°49′N 25°50′E
- Country: Romania
- County: Suceava

Government
  - Mayor (2020–2024): Gheorghe Lazar (PMP)
- Area: 75.91 km^{2} (29.31 sq mi)
- Elevation: 444 m (1,457 ft)
- Population (2021-12-01): 11,164
  - Density: 147.1/km^{2} (380.9/sq mi)
- Time zone: UTC+02:00 (EET)
  - Summer (DST): UTC+03:00 (EEST)
- Postal code: 727345
- Area code: +(40) 230
- Vehicle reg.: SV
- Website: comuna-marginea.ro

Marginea (German: Mardzina) is a commune located in Suceava County, Bukovina, northeastern Romania, consisting of a single village by the same name.

Marginea is known as a centre for the production of a specific type of handcrafted black-coloured ceramics.

== Administration and local politics ==
=== Communal council ===
The commune's current local council has the following political composition, according to the results of the 2020 Romanian local elections:

Party	Seats	Current Council
People's Movement Party (PMP)	6	
National Liberal Party (PNL)	4	
Social Democratic Party (PSD)	2	
PRO Romania (PRO)	2	
Alliance for the Union of Romanians (AUR)	2	
Independent politician (Martinescu Mircea)	1	

== Natives ==
- Orest Onofrei (born 1957), Romanian politician
