= San Sebastián del Pastelillo Fort =

Military fortress in Cartagena de Indias, Colombia

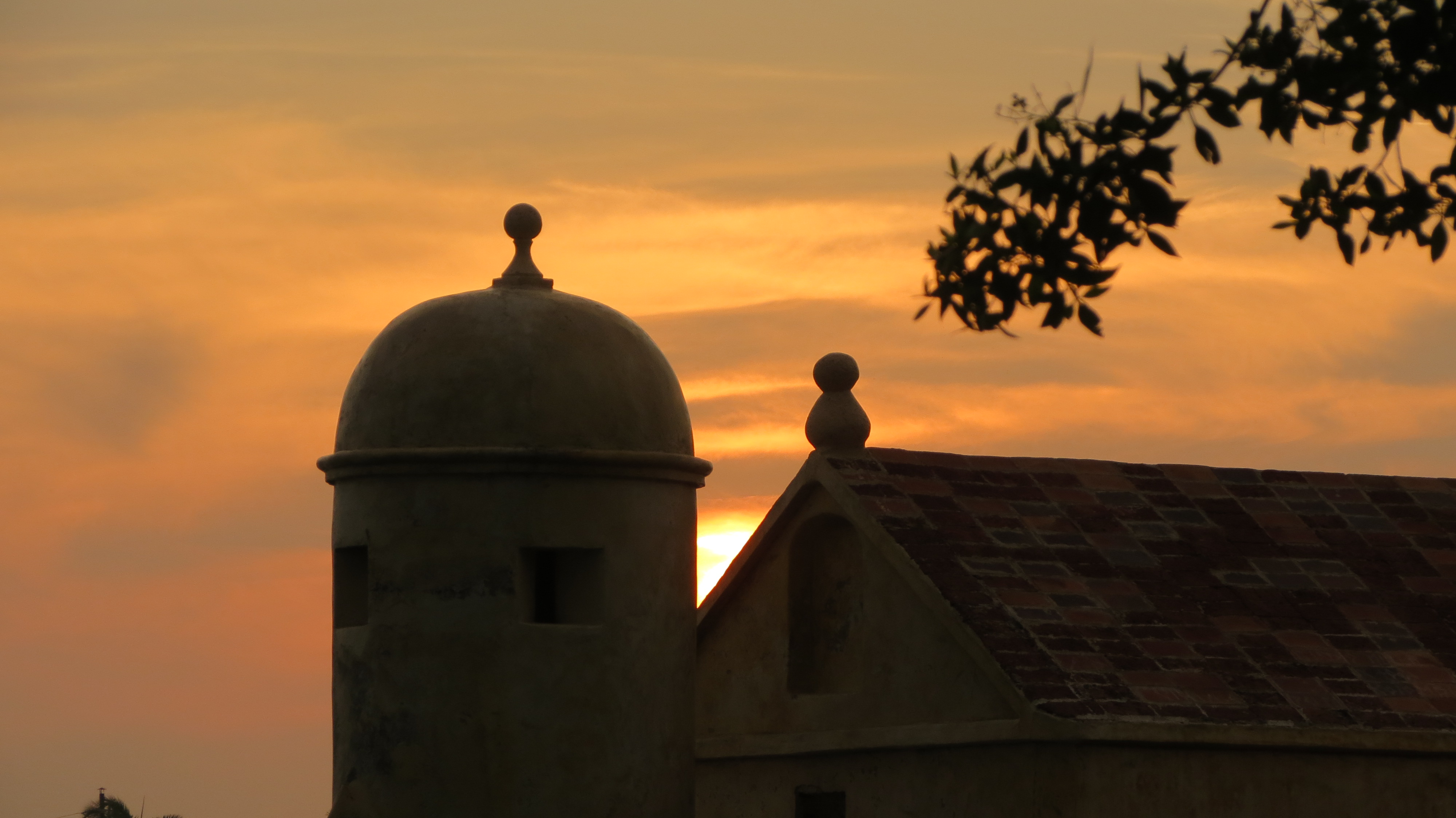
- Interactive map of the San Sebastián del Pastelillo Fort area

General information
- Location: Cartagena de Indias, Colombia
- Coordinates: 10.414088°N 75.543736°W
- Construction started: 1741
- Completed: 1744

The Fort San Sebastián del Pastelillo (Spanish: Fuerte de San Sebastián del Pastelillo) is a military fortress built in colonial times in Cartagena de Indias, Colombia.

== History ==
The Viceroy Sebastián de Eslava ordered the construction of this fort. The construction of the fort began in 1741 and was completed in 1744 under the leadership of the military engineer Juan Bautista Mac-Evan and the collaboration of the engineer Carlos Desnaux. The fort is named "San Sebastián" after Viceroy Sebastían de Eslava, and "Pastelillo" because the structure of the fort resembles a cake. The fort was designed to protect the city from attacks by pirate ships as well as to prevent smuggling of goods. In 1943, President Eduardo Santos Montejo transferred ownership of the fort to the Cartagena Fishing Club. In 1972, the fort was renovated by architect Juan Manuel Zapatero. In 2021, the Ministry of Culture ordered the Cartagena Fishing Club to make repairs to the fort. When the Cartagena Fishing Club painted the façade of the fort in August 2021, it caused quite a stir among social media users. The Office of the Inspector General of Colombia asked the mayor of Cartagena, William Dau, to prevent the damage to the fortress.

== Structure ==
The fort has 3 alignments. In the second alignment it contains 8 cannons originally used to defend the access to Manga Island and in the third alignment it has 7 cannons originally used to defend other lands of Manga Island and the road to San Lazaro Hill. The fort also contained a gunpowder store as well as a dock for landing artillery.
