= Oreste Albertini =

Italian painter (1887–1953)

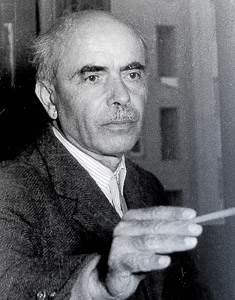
- Born: March 28, 1887
- Died: July 7, 1953
- Occupation: Painter

Oreste Albertini (28 March 1887 – 7 July 1953) was an Italian painter.

He was born in Torre del Mangano. He first attended the Scuola Civica Pavese at Pavia, but at the age of 13 became an apprentice to the fresco artist Cesare Maroni. Together they frescoed the church of Besano in Varese.

In 1910, he enrolled in night classes at the school of decoration at the Umanitaria of Milan and the Brera Academy, paying for his courses by decorative painting and working as a machinist at factories.

In 1923, he exhibited at the Brera. By the 1930s he arranged to market his works through Giuseppe Zecchini in Milan. After some paintings experimenting with Divisionism, he began painting landscapes of the Dolomites and vedute of the Varesotto (urban areas of Varese).

In 1938, he exhibited in Milan Cimon della Pala – Dolomiti, a painting reminiscent of the work of Segantini.

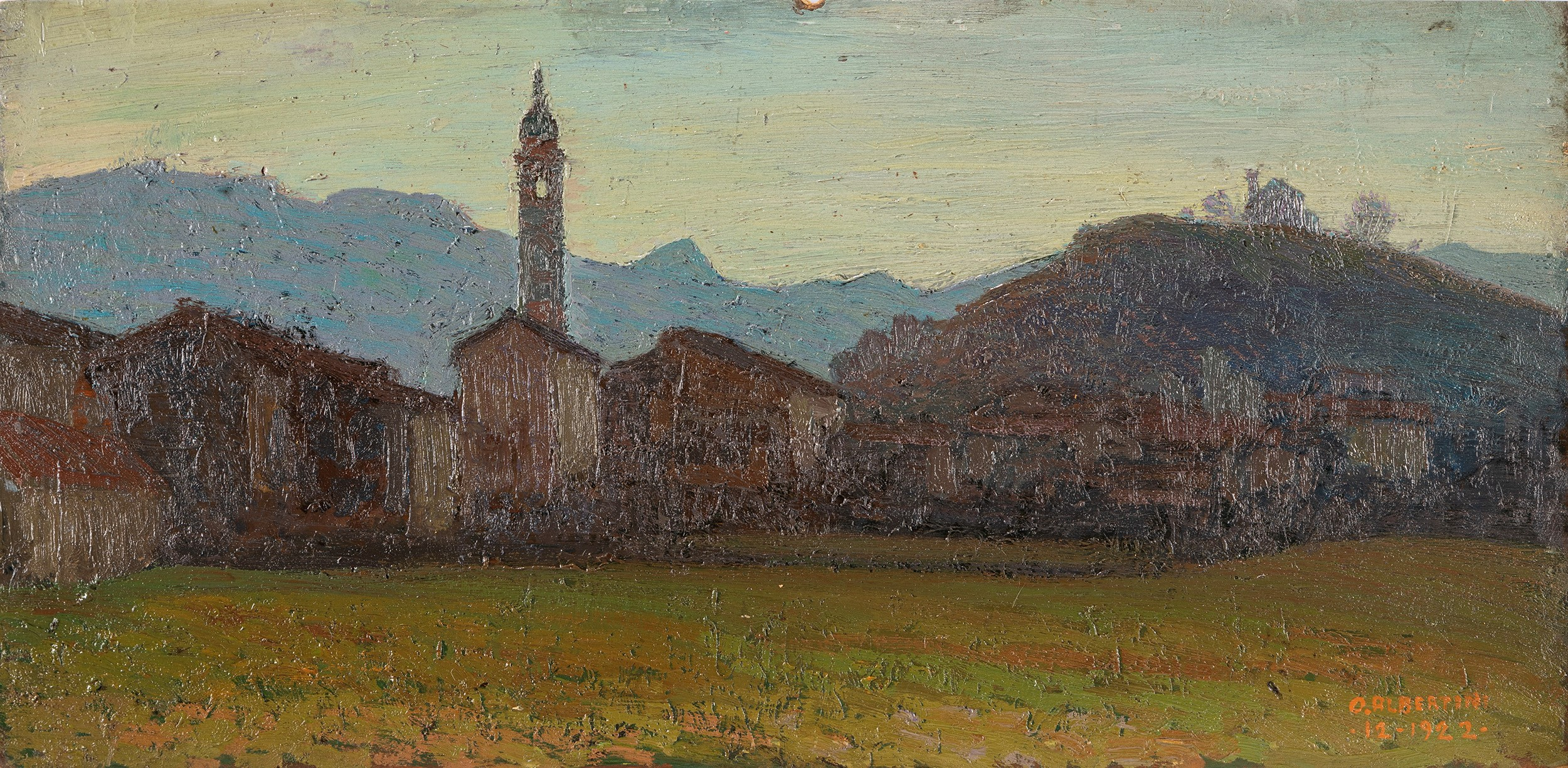
First Lights (1922)

Albertini died in 1953 in Besano, Varese.
