= Oreste Sindici =

Italian-born Colombian musician and composer (1828–1904)

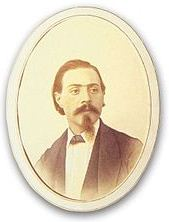
Portrait of Oreste Sindici by Demetrio Paredes (c. 1870)

Oreste Sindici (May 31, 1828 – January 12, 1904) was an Italian-born Colombian musician and composer. He composed the music for the Colombian national anthem in 1887.

== Early life and education ==
He was born in Ceccano (Province of Frosinone) and studied in the Ospizio Apostolico di San Michele at Rome. A lifelong admirer and supporter of Giuseppe Garibaldi, Sindici joined his army of redshirts to defend the short-lived Roman Republic in 1849, after which he began a career as a professional opera tenor. Between 1856 and 1860, Sindici performed as first tenor in theatres in Lanciano, Rome, L'Aquila, Chieti, Cosenza and Avellino, before embarking on a trip to the Americas in 1861 that included stops in Cuba, Barbados, Trinidad & Tobago and Curaçao. In 1862, he arrived to Colombia, where he lived for the rest of his life.

== Career ==
In 1887 he was asked to compose the music to a poem written by Rafael Núñez. The song was released on November 11, 1887, in commemoration of the Independence of Cartagena de Indias. In 1920 this song officially became the Colombian national anthem.

Oreste Sindici died in Bogotá on January 12, 1904, after suffering from political persecution by the conservative governments of Miguel Antonio Caro. As a result, it took until 1937 for the Colombian government to honor his memory.

== Bibliography ==
- Cacua Prada, Antonio (1987). Sindici o la música de la libertad. Bogotá: Universidad Central.
- Klein, Alexander (2023). La Colonia de Euterpe: Músicos Italianos en la Bogotá del Siglo XIX. Bogotá: Egea Sur.
- Klein, Alexander (2017). Oreste Sindici: Obras completas. Bogotá: Universidad de los Andes.
- Perdomo, Escobar (1963). Historia de la música en Colombia. Bogotá: Editorial ABC
