= Filippo Cioni =

Italian translator and notary (1461–1520)

Filippo Cioni (December 14, 1461 – 1520) was an Italian translator and notary, associated with Girolamo Savonarola.

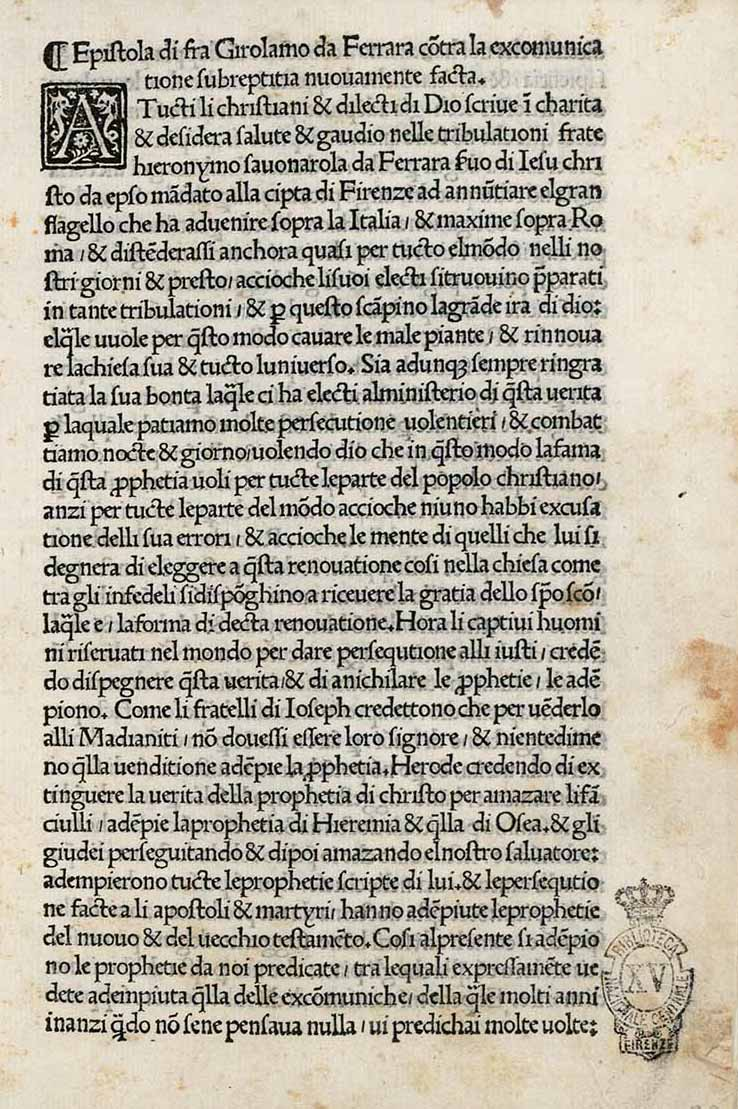
Epistola contra sententiam excommunicationis (1497) of Girolamo Savonarola, translated into the vernacular by Filippo Cioni

== Life ==
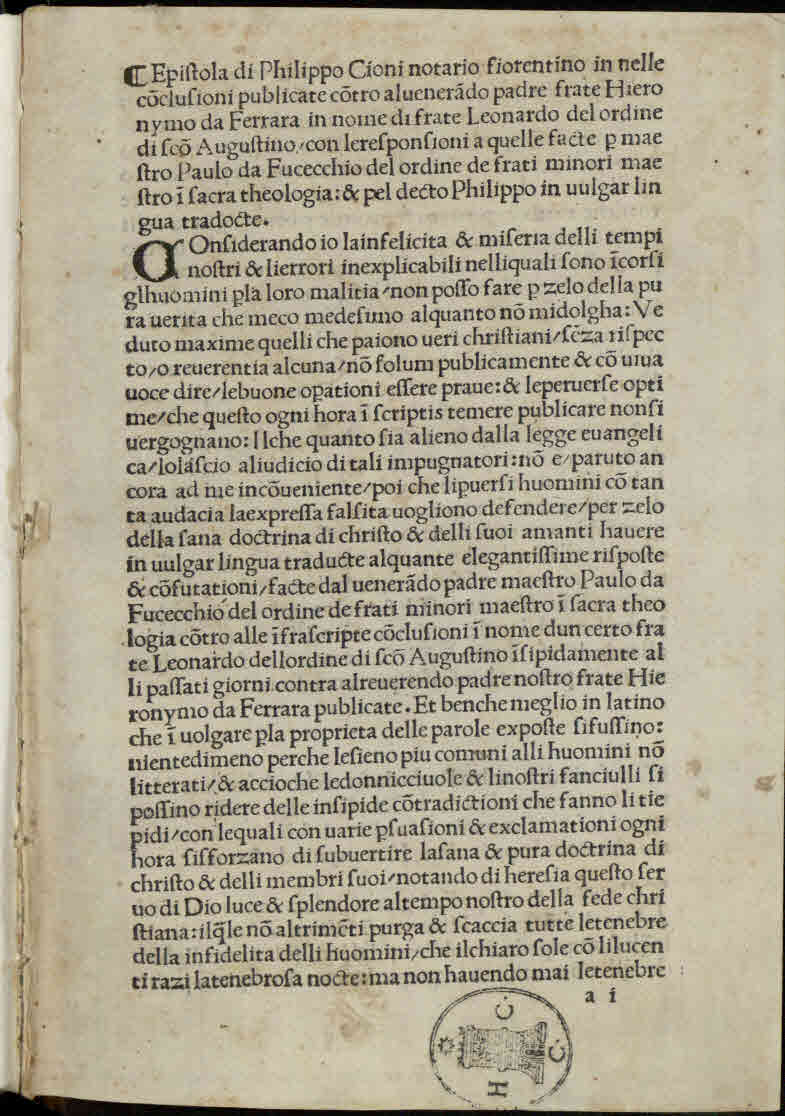
Contro alle conclusioni pubblicate contro a frate Hieronymo Savonarola, 1497

Cioni was born in Florence in 1461. Coming from a wealthy family of artisans and traders, he was directed to notary studies. He began his profession in 1486 after learning Latin and was successful enough to be able to gain the favor of a clientele consisting largely of religious institutes of nobles with a good turnover of interests and business.

He personally met Girolamo Savonarola, of whom he was a fervent supporter, and took care of collecting the signatures of the citizens for the petition of 1497 in his favor.

In the same year he also translated into the vernacular a Latin writing by a Franciscan theologian, Paolo of Fucecchio, in defense of Savonarola.

After Savonarola's conviction, Cioni had to pay a fine for having validated the subscription to the petition that supported him, but he continued to practise the profession of notary until 1520, the year in which he is presumed to have died in Florence.

== Translations ==
- Savonarola, Girolamo (1497). Epistola contra sententiam excomunicationis. Firenze: Lorenzo Morgiani, Johann Petri.
- Savonarola, Girolamo (1497). Expositio in septem gradus Bonaventurae. Firenze: Bartolomeo de' Libri.
- Paolo da Fucecchio (1497). Conclusioni pubblicate contro Girolamo Savonarola in nome del frate Leonardo. Firenze: Lorenzo Morgiani.
