= Graziano Cioni =

Italian politician (born 1946)

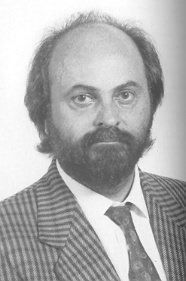
Photo of Graziano Cioni (1992)

Graziano Cioni (born in Empoli on 17 November 1946) is an Italian politician.

== Political career ==
He was deputy to the House in the 12th legislature of the Italian Senate.

An insurer by profession, he held public office in the Florentine administration from the early 1970s. Already in 1975 he was provincial councillor, from 1980 to 1983 he was a councillor for staff at the Giunta Gabbuggiani and in 1985 he was municipal councillor at Annona in Giunta Bogianckino. In 1987 he became a councillor for transport until 1990 in Giunta Morales, and again appointed councillor in 1999 under Mayor Domenici, a position he held until 2009.

== Councillor of the City of Florence ==
At the Municipal Council of Florence he held the following assignments:

- Public health and socio-sanitary integration
- Society of Health
- Public hygiene
- Social Security
- IPAB
- Security and Urban Viability
- Municipal police
- Safe city
- Occupation and public land alterations for roadmaps
- Coordination of works and demonstrations for roadside profiles
- Road maintenance and public areas
- Furnishings and urban decor

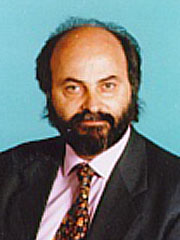
Graziano Cioni (1996)

== Disputes ==
In November 2008, Mr Cioni, as well as a candidate for Mayor of Florence, was indicted with the allegation of corruption together with the entrepreneur Salvatore Ligresti and the urban planning director Gianni Biagi regarding the urban development of Castello area north of Florence, owned by the Fondiaria Sai Insurance Group. In March 2013, together with the other suspects, he was acquitted of corruption at first instance. He was then sentenced, along with the other defendants, to 1 year and 1 month imprisonment.

In May 2016, the Court of Cassation annulled without delay the convictions imposed by the Court of Appeal of Florence for corruption on the urban transformation of the Castello area.

== After withdrawal ==
After his retirement, he started a series of journalistic collaborations with La Nazione and RTV 38. In 2011 he signed an autobiographical book. In July 2016 he became part of the Filippo Turati Onlus Foundation board of directors, a legal institution established in 1968 by the President of Italy Giuseppe Saragat, whose registered office is located in Pistoia and which also operates in the Pistoia mountains (Gavinana), Vieste (Foggia, Gargano promontory) and Zagarolo (Rome).
