= Orest Onofrei =

Romanian politician

Orest Onofrei (born 17 March 1957 in Marginea, Suceava County, Romania) is a Romanian veterinarian and politician. A member of the Democratic Liberal Party (PDL), he represented Suceava County in the Chamber of Deputies from December 2004 to February 2005, and has been a Senator for the same county since December 2008.

== Political career ==
In January 2005, he was named prefect of Suceava County. In April 2008, he was dismissed from his job of prefect and named subprefect of the same county. Meanwhile, in November 2004 he was elected to the Chamber of Deputies as a member of the National Liberal Party (PNL), serving until his resignation early the following year. In August 2008, he resigned and decided to run in the 2008 election on a PDL ticket, winning a Senate seat in a Suceava County district.

He was nominated in 2009 to be part of the second Emil Boc Cabinet, but soon after, he resigned from this office after the press began revealing information about a car accident in which he was involved. Onofrei explained his decision by saying he did not want to put the President or the Prime Minister in a difficult situation.

== Car accident ==
In June 2002, while driving above the legal speed limit through Cleja village, Bacău County, he hit and killed an 8-year-old child, Paul Hădărag. In 2006, he was sentenced to a suspended prison term of one year. He appealed and the sentence was overturned in 2007.
