= Oreste Cioni =

Italian footballer (1913–1968)

Oreste Cioni (born 13 February 1913 in Telgate, died 1968 in Terni) was an Italian footballer. He made his debut with Ternana in 1932–1933 season, while his club was playing in I Divisione. Cioni then played for Grosseto, Siena, Taranto and Pisa, before returning to Ternana in the 1939–1940 season, in Serie C. He played for Ternana until 1947–1948 season in Serie B.

After five years, when Ternana was fallen in Promozione, he became player-manager of the team. The following year he remained only as a manager and won the promotion in Serie D. He managed Ternana in two other seasons, 1960–1961 in Serie D and 1965–1966 in Serie C, both times taking over the place.

With 37 goals scored he is the 7th all time scorer for Ternana.

== Career ==
1932-1948 Ternana 149 (37)
1952-1953 Ternana 1 (0)

== Manager career ==
1952-1954 Ternana
1960-1961 Ternana
1965-1966 Ternana
