= Oreste Recchione =

Italian painter (1841–1904)

Oreste Recchione (September 30, 1841 – November 10, 1904) was an Italian painter, mainly of landscapes but also of religious and mythologic paintings.

== Biography ==
Recchione was born in Sant'Angelo dei Lombardi near Chieti, Province of Chieti. He moved with his parents to Palena. After elementary studies in Palena, he moved to further studies in Pescocostanzo in the Abruzzi. In 1856, his uncle, a doctor and professor at the University in Naples, brought Recchione to study, where he enrolled in the Academy of Fine Arts of Naples, along with his friend Teofilo Patini, studying under Basilio Puoti, Biagio Molinari, and Giuseppe Mancinelli. By 1859, he was gravitating to the circle of the painters del vero, Domenico Morelli and Filippo Palizzi. After the fall of the Bourbon monarchy, Recchione helped found the Society for the Promotion of the Arts in Naples. Later in life, he moved to Palena in the Abruzzo. He died in Naples, aged 63.

Among his works are : "La Pioggia ed il Potatore" (exhibited in 1871 at Naples); Dafni e Cloe (1877); Una sera d'autunno ne' monti Abruzzesi (1884); "Inverno" (1885); "Primavera" (1885, exhibited at Genoa), and "L'avanguardia del gregge" (1890. Naples).Recchione has two paintings in Abruzzo: St Andrew Fisherman (1870) in the church of the Madonna del Rosario in Palena, and a Holy Family (1902) in Abbey of Monteplanizio at Lettopalena.

An exhibit of his works was held in 1996 at the Castello of Palena and the Museo "Costantino Barbella" of Chieti: "Oreste Recchione poeta della natura", curated by Cosimo Savastano and Bianca Maria De Luca, Provincia di Chieti.
