= Timeline of Bogotá =

Coordinates: 4.598056°N 74.075833°W

The following is a timeline of the history of the city of Bogotá, Colombia.

== Prehistory ==
- The area around Bogotá was inhabited since the late Pleistocene, with sites El Abra (12,500 BP), Aguazuque and Tequendama as earliest evidences of inhabitation

The Bogotá savanna

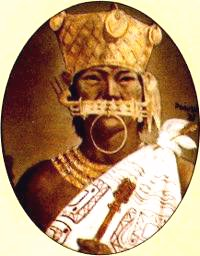
Tisquesusa
(† 1537)

The flat Bogotá savanna is clearly visible in the topography of the Altiplano Cundiboyacense. The flatlands are the fertile bottom of a Pleistocene lake that existed until around 30,000 years BP. The last zipa of the Muisca, ruling over the Bogotá savanna, was Tisquesusa, who was killed by one of the soldiers of the conquest expedition, opening up the reign of the Spanish over the terrain and the foundation of Bogotá

== Pre-conquest ==
- Before 1538 – Bogotá and its surroundings were called Bacatá by the Muisca who inhabited the Bogotá savanna and were organised in their loose Muisca Confederation

== 16th century ==
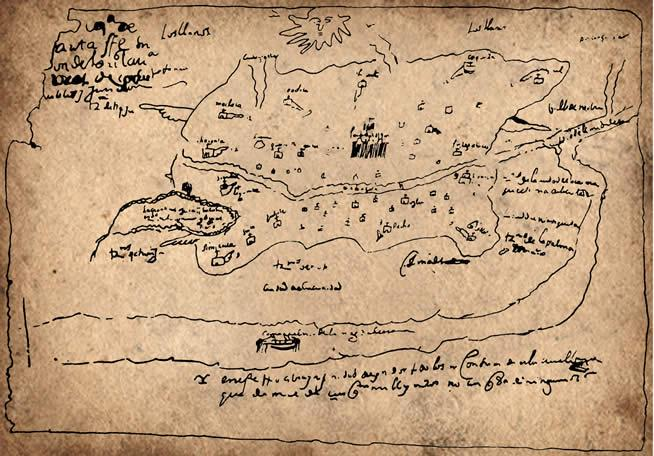
Map of Santafé, by cacique Turmequé 1572

- 1538 – Santa Fe de Bogotá founded by Spanish conquistador Gonzalo Jiménez de Quesada.
- 1539 – 27 April: Municipal council in session
- 1540 – City status granted by Charles I of the Spanish Empire
- 1549 – City becomes capital of the New Kingdom of Granada
- 1550 – Santo Domingo convent founded.
- 1553 – Main Plaza relocated
- 1557 – Santo Domingo convent relocated
- 1558 – Smallpox epidemic
- 1561 – Roman Catholic Diocese of Santafé en Nueva Granada established
- 1564 – Archbishop Juan de los Barrios gifts his house for the establishment of the San Pedro hospital
- 1565 – Chapel built
- 1578 – The entrepreneur and landowner Francisco Hernán Sanchéz, urbanizes the surrounding areas to the river and builds a temple
- 1580 – Saint Thomas Aquinas University founded
- 1592 – San Bartolomé Seminar School founded

== 17th century ==
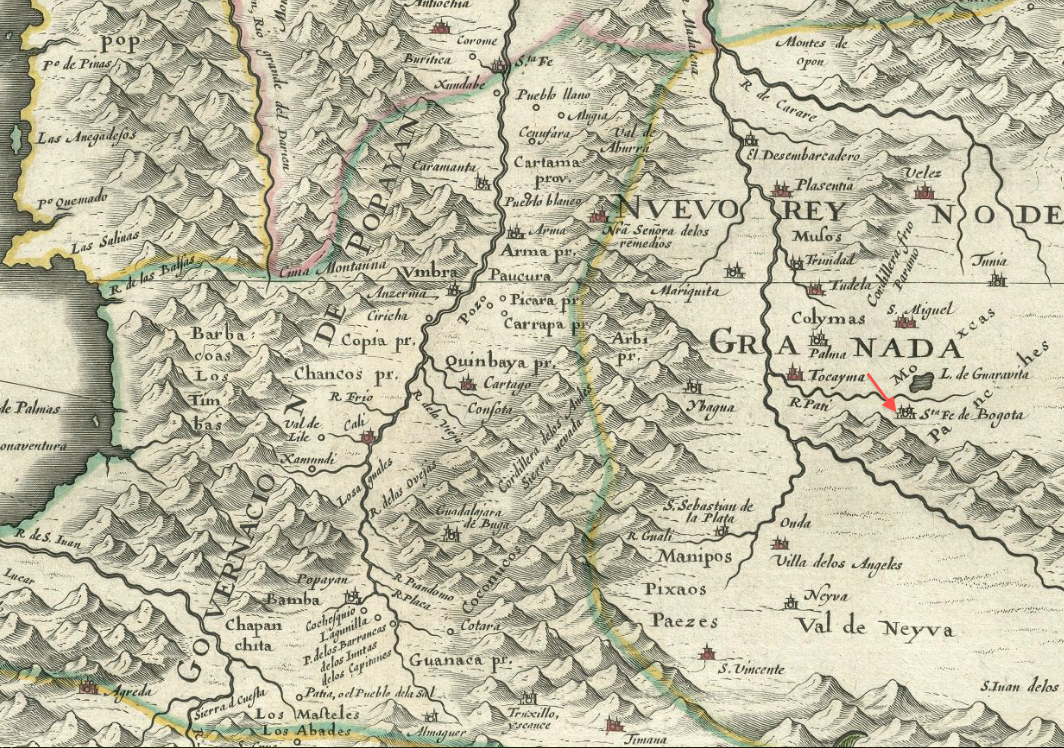
Map of Bogotá and surrounding valleys 1650

- 1604 – Jesuit college established
- 1616 – Population: 3,000
- 1621
  - Mint established
  - Church of San Francisco built.
- 1635 – Iglesia de San Ignacio (church) opens
- 1653 – Our Lady of the Rosary University founded
- 1674 – Santa Clara church built
- 1675 – Leprosy epidemic
- 1681 – Typhus epidemic
- 1692 – Measles epidemic

== 18th century ==
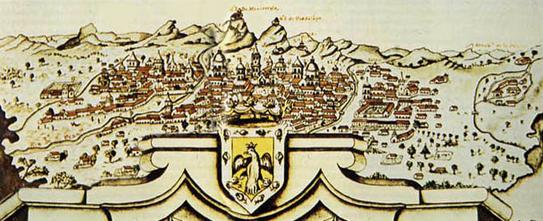
Panoramic view of Bogotá 1772

- 1714 – Earthquake
- 1717 – City becomes capital of the Viceroyalty of New Granada
- 1739 – The San Pedro hospital is renamed as the San Juan de Dios hospital
- 1777 – Real Biblioteca Publica (library) founded
- 1781 – The rebellion of the Comuneros (commoners in English) takes place
- 1782 – José Antonio Galán and other leaders of the Comuneros are hanged in the Plaza Mayor de Santafé
- 1783 – La Enseñanza school founded
- 1785 – Earthquake
- 1789 – Population: 18,161
- 1791
  - First map of the city is made by Domingo Esquiaqui
  - Papel periódico de la Ciudad de Santa Fe de Bogota newspaper begins publication

== 19th century ==
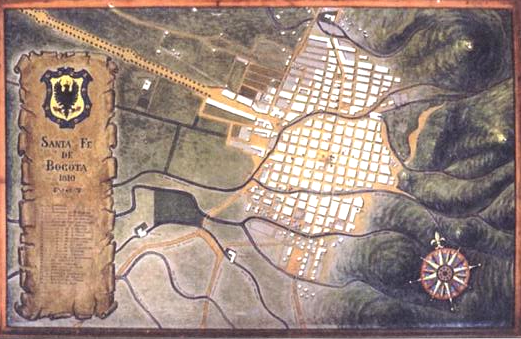
Map of Bogotá 1810

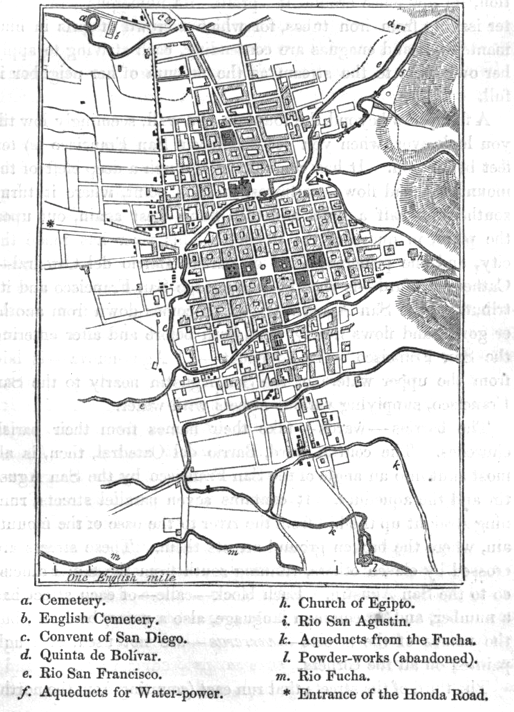
Map of Bogotá 1857

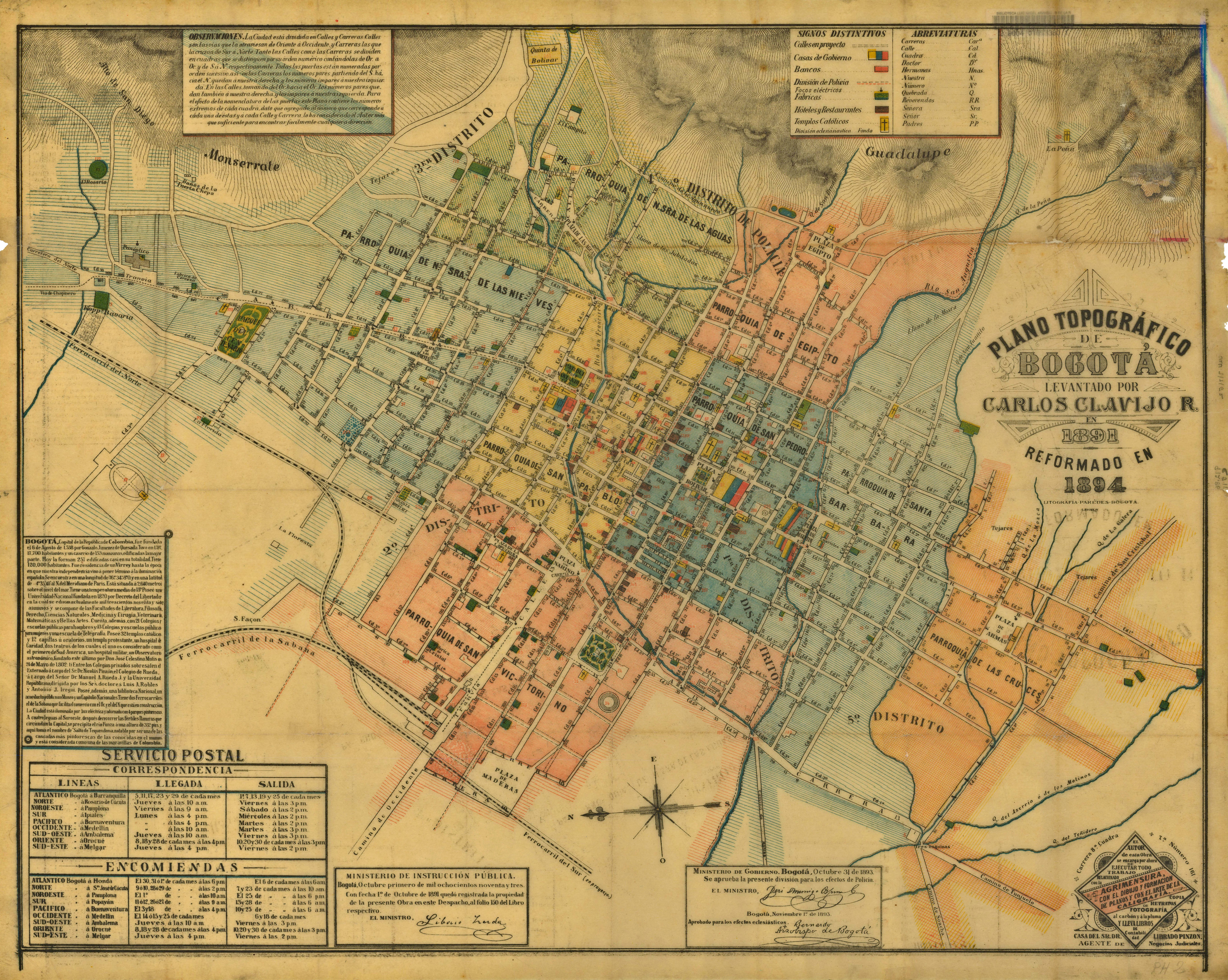
Map of Bogotá 1894

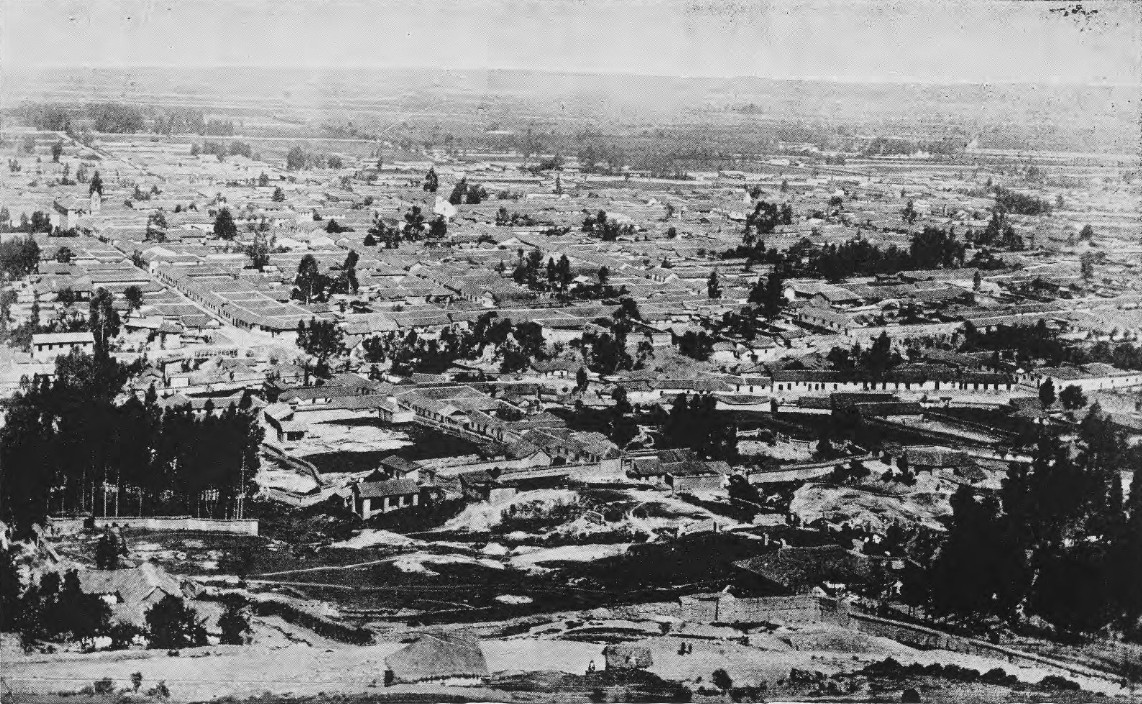
Overview of Bogotá 1893

- 1801 – Population: 21,394
- 1803 – Observatorio Astronómico constructed
- 1810 – City becomes capital of the Free and Independent State of Cundinamarca
- 1811 – Local revolt against Spanish rule.
- 1816
  - Spaniard Pablo Morillo in power
  - Puerta Falsa cafe in business
- 1819
  - Battle of Boyacá and the Spanish evacuate.
  - Santafé de Bogotá is renamed as Bogotá
  - Population: 30,000
- 1823 – Primatial Cathedral of Bogotá completed.
- 1824 – Colombian National Museum opens
- 1836 – Central Cemetery of Bogotá established
- 1840
  - Trolleybus starts operating
  - El Día newspaper begins publication
- 1846
  - Sociedad Filarmonica founded
  - Caja de Ahorros (bank) established
  - Statue of Simón Bolívar is erected in the center of the Plaza Mayor
  - Police Force of Bogotá established
- 1847 – Society of Artisans organized
- 1864 – Medicine & Natural Sciences Society founded
- 1865 – Telegraph begins operating
- 1867 – Universidad Nacional de Colombia (national university) is founded
- 1870 – Banco de Bogota founded
- 1871 – Academia Colombiana de la Lengua (national language academy) founded
- 1875 – Capitol building constructed
- 1876 – Prison begins operating.
- 1881 – Papel Periódico Ilustrado begins publication
- 1884
  - Compañía Colombiana de Teléfonos (telephone company) established
  - Tramway begins operating
- 1886 – Universidad Externado de Colombia and Escuela de Bellas Artes (school) founded
- 1887 – The aqueduct is upgraded to an iron aqueduct pipe
- 1889
  - Bogotá Savannah Railway begins operating.
  - Bogotá Electric Light Company is founded
- 1890 – Bavaria brewery in business
- 1891 – The Medicine & Sciences Society is renamed as Academia de Medicina (Colombia), (Medicine Academy)
- 1892
  - Usaquen train station of the Ferrocarril del Norte (Bogotá) inaugurated
  - Teatro de Cristóbal Colón inaugurated
- 1893
  - January: riots
  - El Artesano newspaper begins publication
- 1895
  - Municipal Theatre inaugurated
  - Population: 95,813
- 1896 – The glass factory Fenicia established
- 1898
  - Hipodromo de la Gran Sabana (racecourse) inaugurated
  - Revista Ilustrada begins publication
- 1900 – 31 July: Coup

== 20th century ==
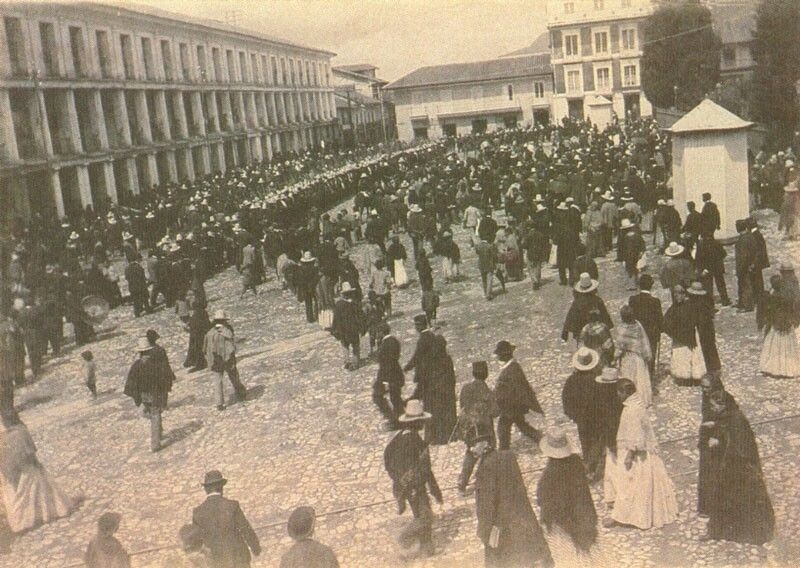
Plaza Bolívar 1900

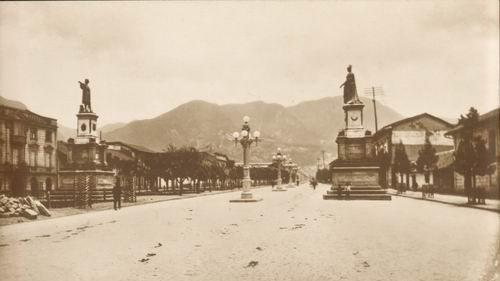
Statue of Christopher Columbus, inaugurated in 1906 1920s

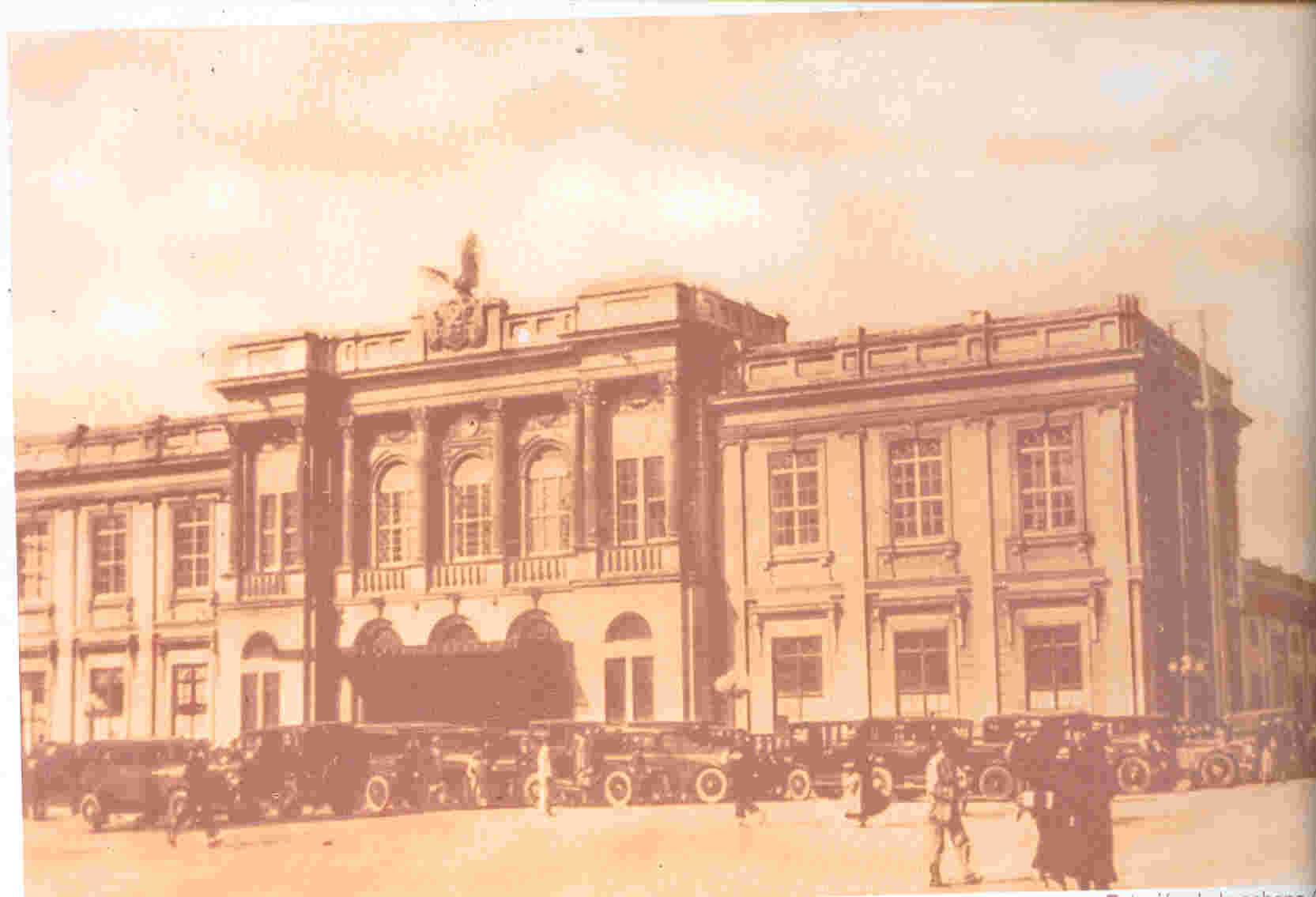
Central train station 1930

- 1902
  - Academia Colombiana de Historia (history academy) founded
  - The Edificio de Lievano (city hall) set
- 1905 – Population: 100.000
- 1908 – Palacio de Nariño dedicated
- 1909
  - Compañia de Cementos Samper (cement company) established
  - Electric streetcar begins operating
- 1910
  - Exposición del Centenario de la independencia (world's fair) held
  - Javier Tobar Ahumada becomes mayor
- 1911
  - First airplane lands in Bogotá for an exhibition
  - El Tiempo newspaper begins publication
- 1912
  - Population: 121,257
  - Carlos Eduardo Padilla builds an airplane and flies over Chapinero
- 1915 – El Espectador newspaper begins publication in Bogota
- 1918
  - Population: 143.994
  - Flu epidemic
- 1921 – First student strike
- 1922 – Quinta de Bolívar museum inaugurated
- 1923 – Police headquarters building constructed
- 1926 – Capitolio Nacional built
- 1928
  - Bogotá Stock Exchange established
  - Population: 235,421
- 1929 – Medellín-Bogota railway begins operating
- 1930
  - Aerodromo del Techo (aerodrome) is built
  - The Voz de la Victor (radio) founded
- 1931 – Santamaría Bullring constructed
- 1933 – First Juegos Atléticos Nacionales takes place
- 1936 – El Siglo newspaper begins publication
- 1937 – University City (campus) of National University of Colombia built
- 1938
  - Estadio El Campín, Alfonso López Pumarejo Stadium, and National Library building constructed
  - 400th anniversary of city founding
  - Avenida de Las Américas (avenue) built
  - Population: 336,996
  - First Feria Internacional del Libro de Bogotá (book fair) inaugurated
- 1939 – Gold Museum established
- 1941 – Corporación Deportiva Santa Fe (football club) formed
- 1946 – Millonarios Fútbol Club formed
- 1947 – Architect Le Corbusier is hired to conduct the city planning
- 1948
  - March–April: International Conference of American States held
  - 9 April: Bogotazo
  - District University of Bogotá and University of the Andes established
- 1951 – Population: 648,324.
- 1952 – City flag design adopted
- 1953 – Bogotá Museum of Modern Art inaugurated
- 1954
  - Bosa, Engativa, Fontibon, Suba, Usme, and Usaquen townships become part of city
  - First television transmission is made
  - Colombian Film Archive founded
  - La Republica newspaper begins publication
  - Mass migration from other regions in Colombia to Bogotá, due to violence since the Bogotazo
  - Corferias (Fair and Exposition Corporation of Bogotá) founded
- 1955 – Bogotá Botanical Garden opens
- 1956 – University of America founded
- 1958
  - Construction of the 26th Avenue begins
  - Luis Ángel Arango Library opens
- 1959
  - El Dorado Airport in operation
  - Corficolombiana headquartered in Bogota
- 1960 – Population: 1,271,700
- 1961 – John F. Kennedy visits Bogotá
- 1963 – Puente Aranda becomes part of the city
- 1964
  - Population: 1'697.311
  - Charles de Gaulle visits Bogotá
- 1965 – El Espacio newspaper begins publication
- 1967 – Bogotá Philharmonic founded
- 1968
  - August: Pope Paul VI visits the city
  - Simón Bolívar Park inaugurated
  - Embajador Theater opens as one of the few cinemas in the city.
  - Fuerza Aérea de Colombia (national air force) establishes the Aeronautical Museum in the old airport of Techo
- 1969 – Avianca Building constructed
- 1970 – Catholic University of Colombia founded
- 1973 – Population: 2,855,065.
- 1974 – Ciclovía inaugurated
- 1976 – First shopping center in the city, Unicentro (Bogotá) opens
- 1977 – Centro de Comercio Internacional built
- 1978 – Torre Colpatria built
- 1979
  - 93 Park inaugurated.
  - Leftist guerrilla M-19 takes the embassy of Dominican Republic
- 1982 – Military University Nueva Granada established
- 1984
  - Bus terminal inaugurated
  - Metrópolis shopping center inaugurated
  - Bogotá Film Festival begins
- 1985
  - 6 November: Palace of Justice siege
  - Population: 3,974,813.
- 1986
  - 3 July: Pope John Paul II visits the city
  - Children's Museum of Bogotá established
- 1987 – Housing complex Ciudad Salitre construction begins
- 1988
  - Andrés Pastrana Arango first mayor of Bogotá elected by popular vote, previously they were elected by the president or governor
  - Iberoamerican Theater Festival held
- 1989
  - Archivo General de la Nación (government department) inaugurated
  - 6 December: Bombing in Paloquemao
  - Santa Barbara shopping center opens

=== 1990s ===
- 1990 – La Equidad football club formed
- 1991 – Juan Martín Caicedo Ferrer becomes mayor
- 1992 – Sonia Durán de Infante becomes mayor, succeeded by Jaime Castro Castro
- 1993
  - Population: 5'484.244
  - November: Bombing on 15th Avenue
- 1995
  - Rock al Parque music festival begins
  - Antanas Mockus Sivickas becomes mayor
  - Centro Andino shopping mall opens
  - September: Track Cycling World Championships held at Luis Carlos Galán Velodrome
  - McDonald's opens its first restaurant in Colombia.
- 1996
  - Casa de Moneda de Colombia (museum) inaugurated
  - Paul Bromberg Silverstein becomes mayor
- 1998
  - Maloka Museum of science inaugurated
  - Enrique Peñalosa Londoño becomes mayor
- 1999
  - Citytv Bogotá begins broadcasting
  - Louis Vuitton and Bvlgari opens its first boutique in Colombia.
  - Mormon temple dedicated
- 2000
  - TransMilenio bus system begins operating
  - 24 February: Car-Free Day inaugurated

== 21st century ==
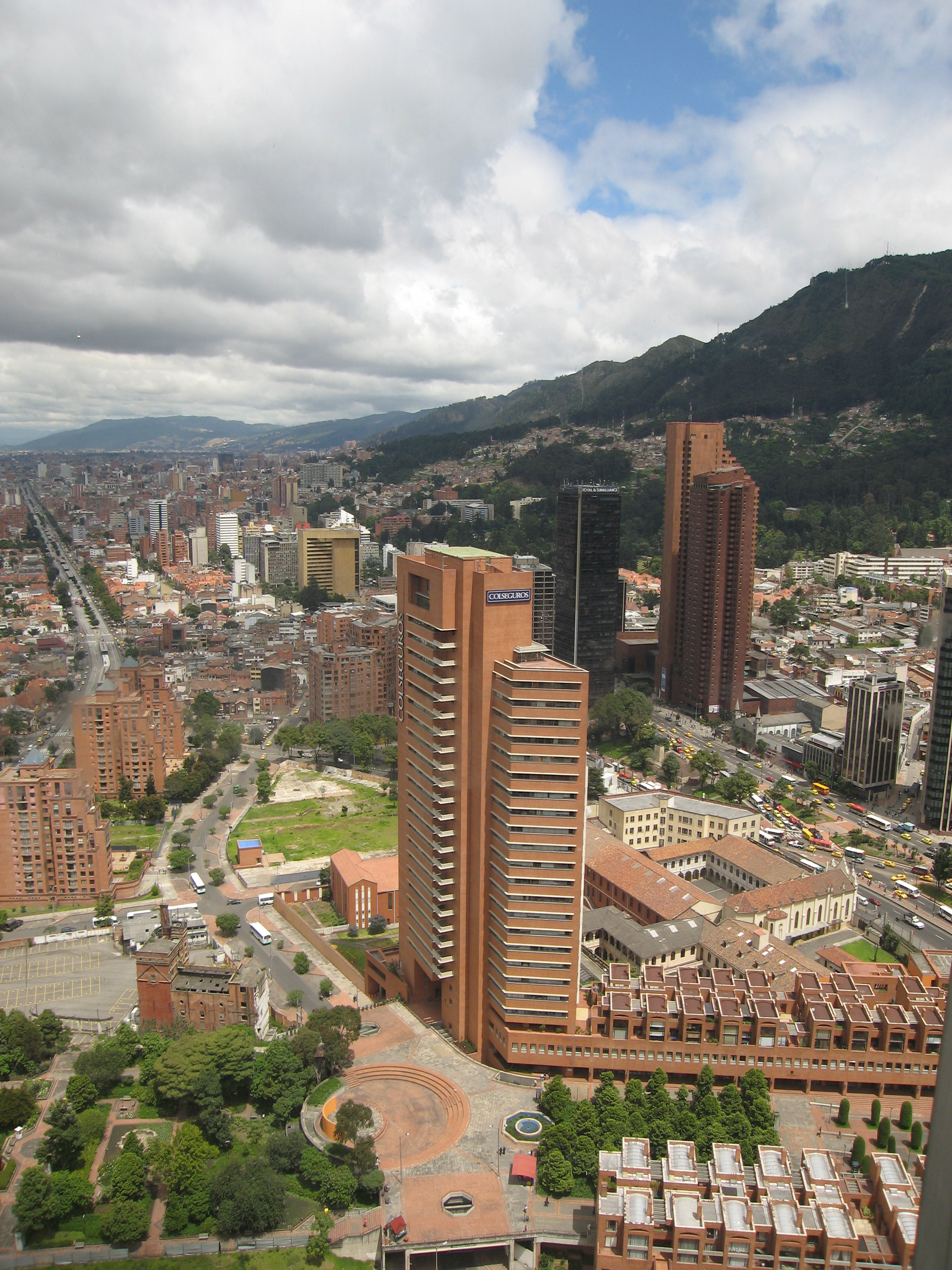
View from Torre Colpatria 2006

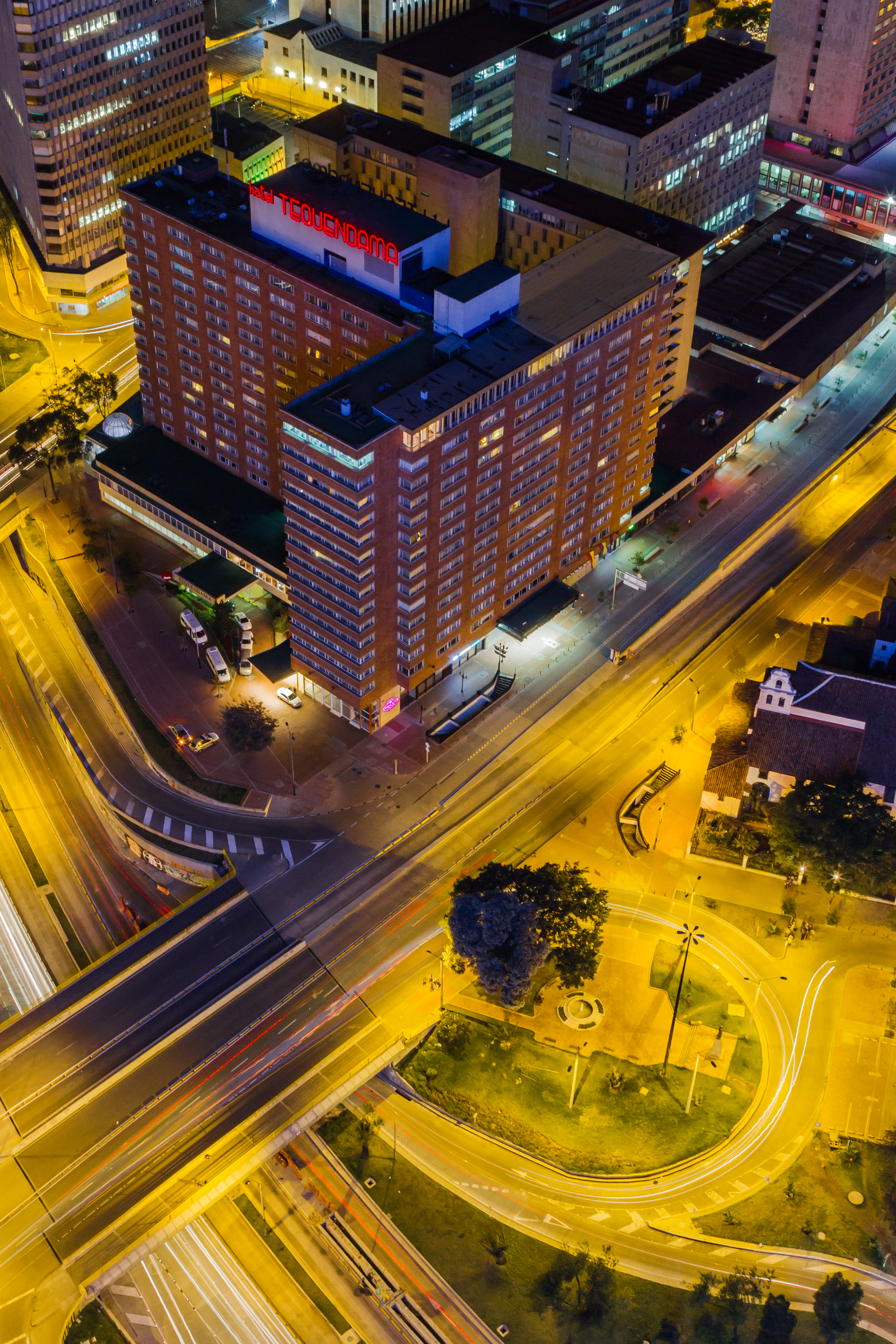
Hotel Crowne Plaza Tequendama at night 2013

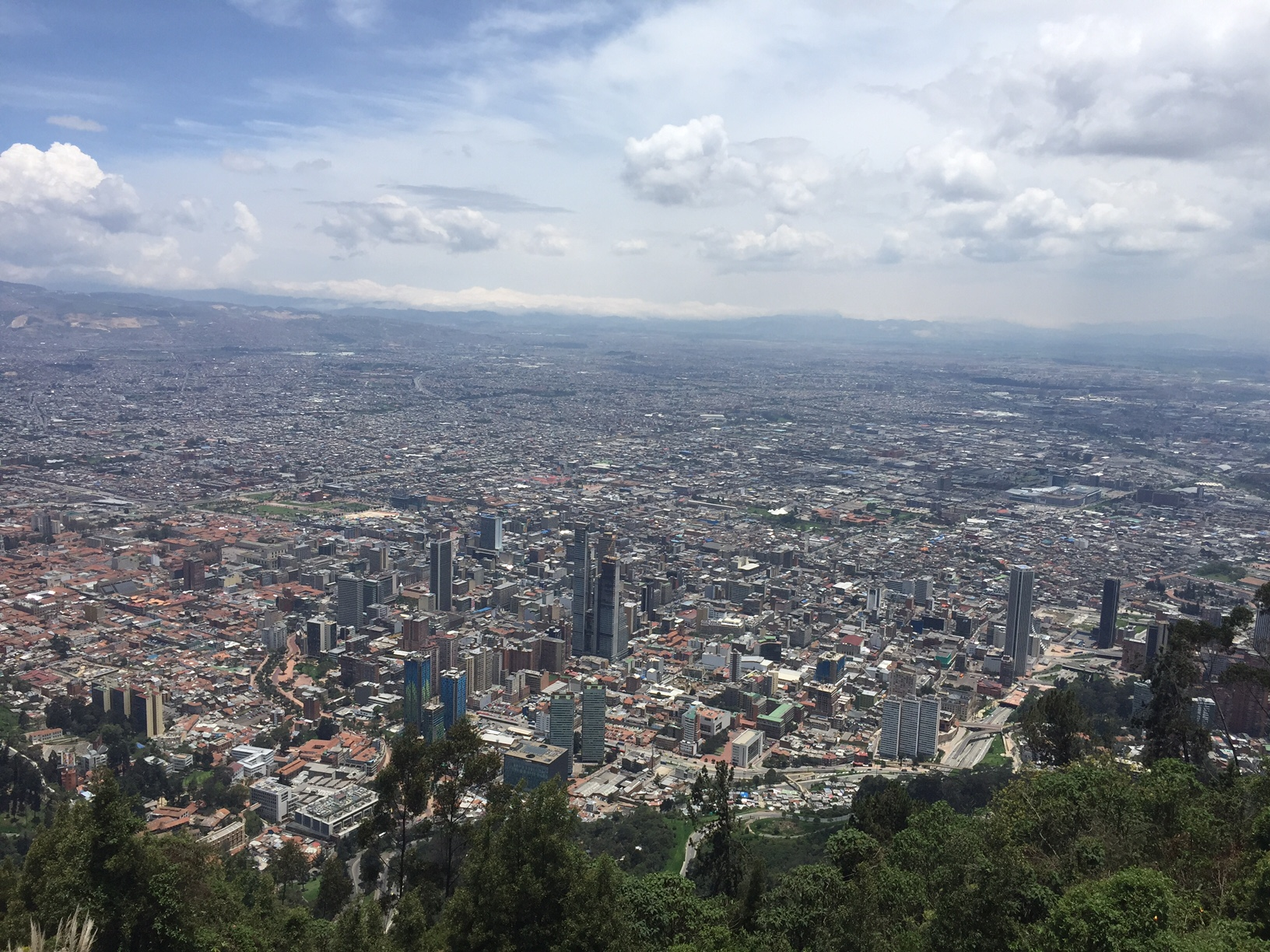
Panoramic view of Bogotá 2016

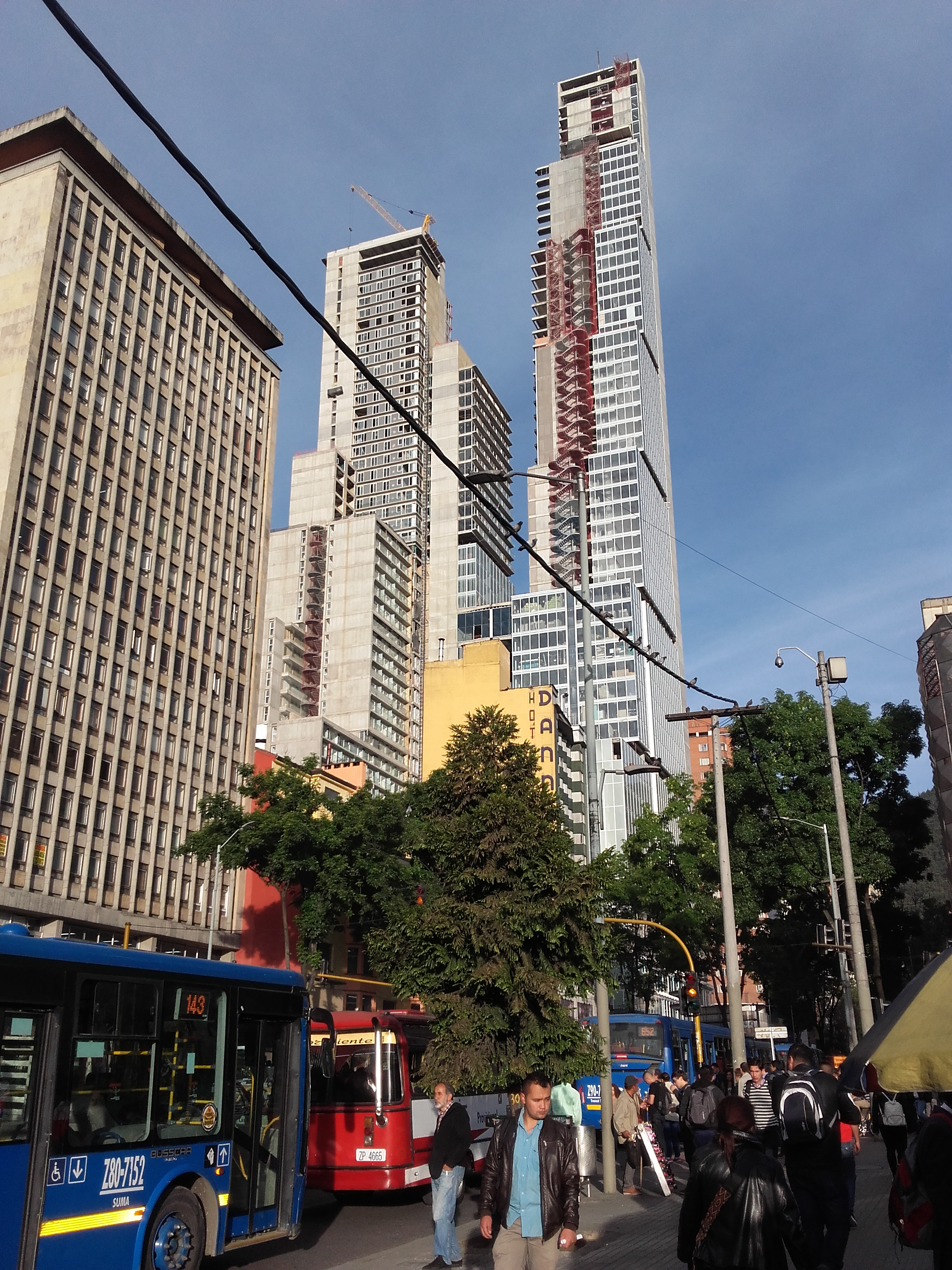
BD Bacatá August 29, 2016

=== 2000s ===
- 2001
  - Colombian Securities Exchange headquartered in city
  - Antanas Mockus Sivickas becomes mayor
  - July: Copa América football tournament held at El Campín Stadium
  - September: Hard Rock Café opens in Bogotá, and Colombia.
- 2002
  - 25 January: Bombing
  - 7 August: Attack at Presidential Palace
  - 13 December: Hotel bombing
- 2003
  - National Symphony Orchestra of Colombia founded
  - 7 February: El Nogal Club bombing
  - 8 October: Bombing
  - 15 November: Attack in pub
- 2004
  - Luis Eduardo Garzón becomes mayor
  - 29 October: Bombing
- 2005
  - Versace opens its first boutique in Colombia.
  - Bogotá's Carnival resurrected
  - Population: 6,778,691
- 2006
  - Bike Paths Network laid out
  - Centro Comercial Santafé shopping mall opens
  - 31 July: Bombing
- 2007
  - May: Inditex starts operations in Bogotá, and Colombia.
  - City named World Book Capital by UNESCO.
- 2008
  - April: Ermenegildo Zegna opens its first boutique in Colombia.
  - La Peluquería (art space) founded
  - Samuel Moreno Rojas becomes mayor
- 2009
  - Fundación Capital headquartered in city
  - October: The MTV Awards were for first time held in Colombia.

=== 2010s ===
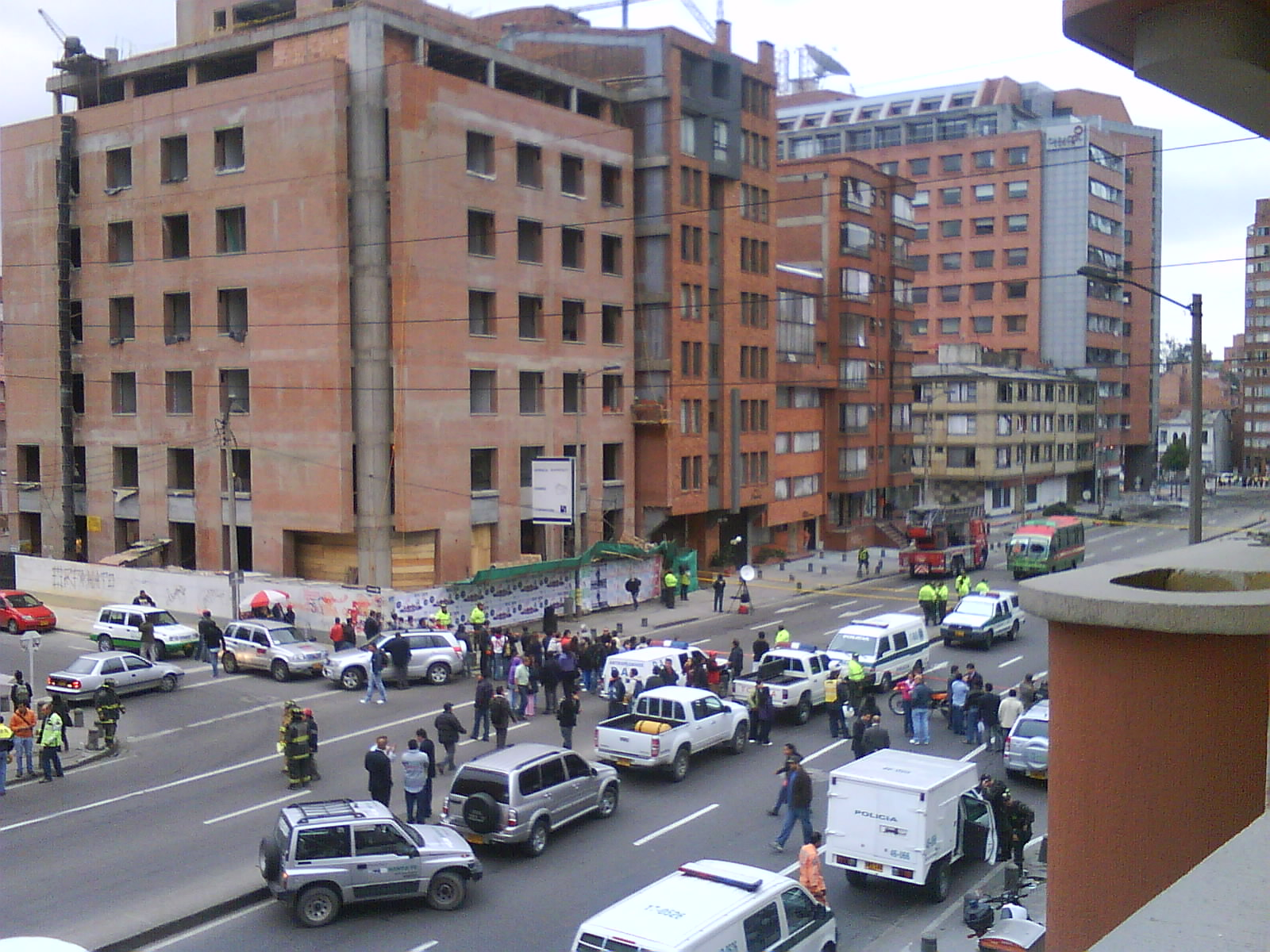
The Headquarters of Caracol Radio after the terrorist attack

- 2010 – Caracol Radio headquarters bombing.
- 2011 – María Fernanda Campo becomes mayor, succeeded by Clara López Obregón
- 2012
  - March: Cartier opens its first jewelry in Colombia.
  - Gustavo Petro becomes mayor
  - Forever 21 opens its first store in Latin America in Bogotá.
- 2013
  - Google Street View begins operating.
  - Total Renew of El Dorado International Airport.
  - Dolce & Gabbana opens its first Boutique in Colombia.
  - December: Pro-Petro demonstration
- 2014
  - February: Burberry opens its first boutique in Colombia.
  - September: Tiffany & Co. opens its first Jewelry in Colombia.
  - Population: 7,776,845 (urban agglomeration).
  - Nickelodeon's Kids' Choice Awards were for first time held in Colombia.
- 2015
  - April: Book fair collapsed by YouTubers.
  - BD Bacatá becomes the tallest building in Colombia.
  - Starbucks opens its controversial first coffee shop in Colombia.
- 2016
  - Population: 7,980,001.
  - Parque La Colina shopping mall opens.
  - Enrique Peñalosa becomes mayor for second time.
- 2017

  - H&M opens its first Store in Colombia.
  - Pope Francis visits the city.
  - Centro Andino Bombing
  - Multiplaza La Felicidad Shopping Mall opens.
- 2018 – The Coliseo Cubierto el Campín was remodeled and renamed as Movistar Arena.

== See also ==
- History of Bogotá
- List of mayors of Bogotá
- Metropolitan Area of Bogotá
- List of universities in Bogotá
- Timeline of Colombian history

Other cities in Colombia:

- Timeline of Cali
- Timeline of Cartagena
- Timeline of Ocaña, Colombia

== Bibliography ==
=== in English ===
Published in the 19th century

- Abraham Rees (1819), "Bogota", The Cyclopaedia, London: Longman, Hurst, Rees, Orme & Brown
- Gaspard Théodore Mollien (1824), "(Santa-Fe de Bogotá)", Travels in the Republic of Colombia, London: C. Knight, OCLC 4373721
- William Duane (1826), "(Bogotá)", A Visit to Colombia, in the Years 1822 & 1823, Philadelphia: T. H. Palmer
- Josiah Conder (1830), "Bogotá", The Modern Traveller, London: J.Duncan, OL 7025017M
- John Steuart (1838). Bogotá in 1836-7: Being a Narrative of an Expedition to the Capital of New Granada. New York: Harper & Brothers.
- Isaac F. Holton (1857), "Bogota", New Granada: Twenty Months in the Andes, New York: Harper & Brothers, OCLC 2422862
- George Henry Townsend (1867), "Santa Fe de Bogota", A Manual of Dates (2nd ed.), London: Frederick Warne & Co.
- Erastus Wilson (1878), "Santa Fe de Bogota", A Ramble in New Granada, New York: G.W. Carleton & Co., OCLC 15516568
- Rosa Carnegie Williams (1881), A Year in the Andes; or, A Lady's Adventures in Bogotá, London: London Literary Society, OCLC 1720050
- "Santa Fe de Bogotá". Harper's New Monthly Magazine. 1885.
- "Bogotá". Commercial Directory of Latin America. Washington DC: Bureau of the American Republics. 1892.
- "City of Santa Fe de Bogotá". Commercial Directory of the American Republics. Washington DC. 1897.

Published in the 20th century

- "Bogota", Chambers's Encyclopaedia, London: W. & R. Chambers, 1901
- Lamoureux, Andrew Jackson (1910). "Bogotá" . Encyclopædia Britannica. Vol. 4 (11th ed.). pp. 120–121.
- V. Levine (1914). Colombia. South American Handbooks. New York: D. Appleton & Co.
- William Alfred Hirst (1915), "Bogotá", Guide to South America, New York: Macmillan Company
- Alfred Coester (1938). "Santa Fe de Bogotá". Hispania. 21 (3): 191–196. doi:10.2307/332672. JSTOR 332672.
- John T. Reid (1939). "Cultural Bogotá". World Affairs. 102.
- David Sowell (1989). "The 1893 Bogotazo: Artisans and Public Violence in Late Nineteenth-Century Bogota". Journal of Latin American Studies. 21.
- Geoff Crowther; et al. (1990), "Bogota", South America (4th ed.), Lonely Planet, p. 461+, OL 8314412M
- David Sowell (1993). "La Caja de Ahorros de Bogotá, 1846-1865: Artisans, Credit, Development, and Savings in Early National Colombia". Hispanic American Historical Review. 73.
- Rakesh Mohan (1994), Understanding the Developing Metropolis: Lessons from the City Study of Bogotá and Cali, Colombia (2nd ed.), Oxford University Press / World Bank, ISBN 9780195208825

Published in the 21st century

- "Bogota". Understanding Slums: Case Studies for the Global Report 2003. United Nations Human Settlements Programme and University College London. 2003.
- David Marley (2005), "Bogota", Historic Cities of the Americas, Santa Barbara, Calif: ABC-CLIO, ISBN 1576070271
- Politics and Security in Three Colombian Cities, London: Crisis States Research Centre, 2009 – via International Relations and Security Network (about Bogota, Cali, Medellin)
- Nancy Rhinehart (2009). "Public Spaces in Bogotá: An Introduction". University of Miami Inter-American Law Review. 40.
- Zeiderman, A., 2013. 'Living Dangerously: Biopolitics and urban citizenship in Bogotá, Colombia', American Ethnologist 40(1):71-87.

=== in Spanish ===
- Charles Wiener (1884), "Bogotá", América pintoresca (in Spanish), Barcelona: Montaner y Simon
- Pedro M. Ibáñez (1891), Las crónicas de Bogotá y de sus inmediaciones (in Spanish), Bogotá: Impr. de la Luz, OCLC 2205470
- José Toribio Medina (1904). La imprenta en Bogotá (1739-1821) (in Spanish). Santiago de Chile: Imprenta Elzeviriana – via HathiTrust. (Annotated list of titles published in Bogotá, arranged chronologically)
- Germán Rodrigo Mejía Pavony (2000). Los años del cambio: historia urbana de Bogotá, 1820-1910 (in Spanish) (2nd ed.). Pontificia Universidad Javeriana.
- Natalia León Soler (2008), "Bogotá: de paso por la capital", Revista Credencial Historia (in Spanish), no. 224 (includes timeline)
