= Timeline of Cartagena, Colombia =

The following is a timeline of the history of the city of Cartagena de Indias, Colombia.

== Prior to 19th century (Colonial era) ==
- 1500 – Rodrigo de Bastidas approaches to Cartagena's bay, naming it Barú bay.
- 1503 – The catholic queen Isabel issue a royal decree, naming the Barú bay as the Cartagena's bay, due to its similarity with Cartagena (España)
- 1523 – Gonzalo Fernández de Oviedo y Valdés obtains permission to commerce in Cartagena's bay and near regions.
- 1525 – Fernandez de Oviedo obtains the capitulation to conquer the actual terrains of Cartagena.
- 1533 - Cartagena founded by Spaniard Pedro de Heredia. It becomes one of the "major naval and merchant marine bases of the Spanish empire."
- 1534 – Catholic Diocese of Cartagena established.
- 1536
  - Castillo San Felipe de Barajas (fort) construction begins.
  - Cartagena obtains the dominance of the Morrosquillo Gulf and the terrains of the Sinú indigenous people.
- 1538 – The Spanish crown authorizes taxes to the Indigenous people.
- 1539 – Indigenous population: 500 approx. Population has decreased due to diseases and confrontations with colonizers.
- 1543 – Jean-François Roberval plunders the city
- 1544 – Town was captured and plundered by pirates.
- 1550 – Heredia becomes governor of Cartagena
- 1552 – A big fire occurs
- 1559 – French Martin Cote assaults Cartagena
- 1561 – The Nuevo Muelle dock is built, made up of wood
- 1565 – 1,000 inhabitants
- 1568 - John Hawkins invades and assaults Cartagena for 8 days.
- 1574
  - Francis Drake assaults Cartagena and destroys 1/4 of the city.
  - King Philip II of Spain gives Cartagena the title of city.
- 1575 – Cartagena is recognized with the "Noble and Loyal" city title, as Cartageneros were Pro-Spanish Crown.
- 1578 – Convento de Santo Domingo construction begins.
- 1579
  - Cartagena attains Spanish colonial city status.
  - San Juan de Dios Hospital builds its second floor
- 1580 – The Saint Augustine convent is founded
- 1582 – Canal del Dique built.
- 1585 – Sir Francis Drake exacted a large ransom from the town.
- 1586 – Battle of Cartagena de Indias (1586). Drake again occupies and destroys much of the city.
- 1595 – By the visit of the military engineer Bautista Antonelli, Cartagena's cobbled streets are traced
- 1603 - The Espiritú Santo hospital is founded in Getsemaní.
- 1610 - King Philip III of Spain establishes the Tribunal de Penas del Santo Oficio de la Inquisición.
- 1612 - Cartagena Cathedral built.
- 1614
  - The Tribunal de Penas del Santo Oficio de la Inquisición proceeds with the first "act of faith".
  - Stonework starts at Baluarte de Santo Domingo for the construction of the wall.
- 1620 - Getsemaní is completely edificated. Its cabidity under the construction of Cartagena's wall is debated.
- 1625 - The Aduana building is concluded.
- 1630 - Population: 6.000
- 1635 - The famous Cartagena Wall is completed, making Cartagena a military hub.
- 1636 - A group of Portuguese immigrants are submitted to an "act of faith", accused of practicing judaism.
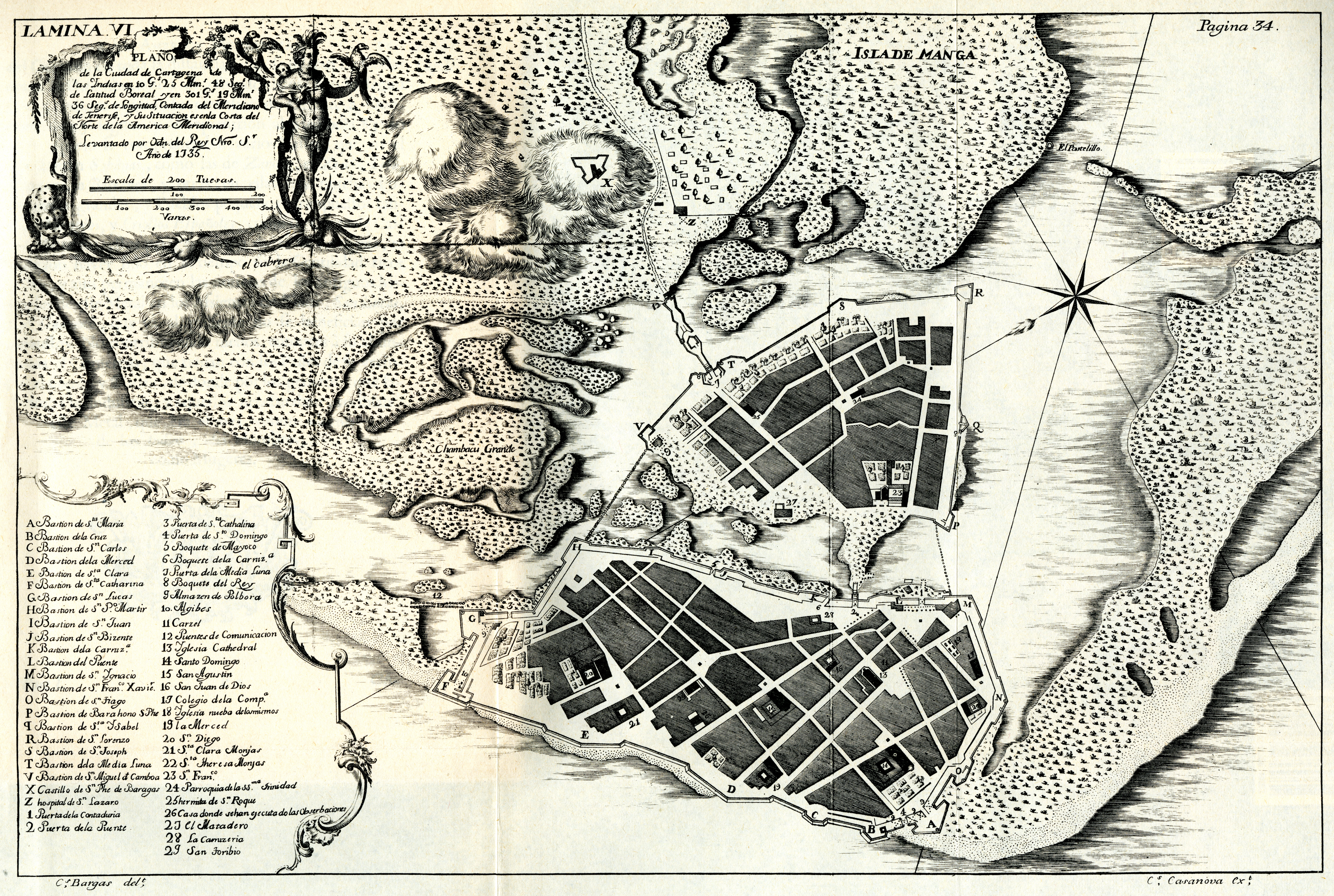
- 1735 city map.
  1646 - Castle of San Luis de Bocachica (fort) construction begins.
- 1651 - Yellow fever epidemic in Cartagena.
- 1654 - Iglesia de San Pedro Claver built.
- 1657 - Castle San Felipe de Barajas (fort) is built over the San Lázaro hill.
- 1683 - Raid on Cartagena (1683).
- 1684 - Population: 7.341
- 1697 - May 6: Raid on Cartagena (1697).
- 1708 - Wager's Action, a naval confrontation on 8 June 1708, between a British squadron under Charles Wager and the Spanish treasure fleet off the coast near Cartagena
- 1709 - Population: 4.556
- 1710 - The city is fully recovered from what the last raid destroyed.
- 1717 - Cartagena becomes part of the Spanish colonial Viceroyalty of New Granada.
- 1730 - The San Carlos Hospital and the Poors Hospital open.
- 1732 - El templo Santo Toribio (temple) built.
- 1735 - Franciscan Church of the Third Order built.
- 1741 - Battle of Cartagena de Indias. Large attacking force led by Admiral Edward Vernon defeated at the Castillo San Felipe by an outnumbered defensive force led by Blas del Lezo.
- 1757 - Governor of Cartagena dictates the closing of Bocagrande's channel, making a peninsula, now called Bocagrande.
- 1767 - After the expulsion of the jesuits the San Juan de Dios hospital is relocated.
- 1769 - Castle San Felipe de Barajas is reinforced and enlarged by Antonio de Árevalo, becoming the biggest fort in Cartagena.
- 1770 - Palace of Inquisition built (approximate date).
- 1777 - 13.700 inhabitants.
- 1780 - El espigón de La Tenaza (shore end) built.
- 1785 - Antonio de Árevalo builds nine installations for ill people in Caño del Oro, Tierrabomba island.
- 1795 - Consulado (merchant guild) established.
- 1796 - Military barracks (known as Bóvedas) aside of the wall, are finished.

== 19th century ==
- 1809 - 17.600 inhabitants.
- 1810 - May 22: A coup leads to the creation of a new governing council.
- 1811 - November 11: Cartagena's Cabildo declares absolute independence from Spain, creating the Free State of Cartagena.
- 1811 - Cartagena becomes part of the newly formed United Provinces of New Granada.
- 1815
  - March: Simón Bolívar blocks Cartagena for two months and takes military weapons in order to recuperate sister city Santa Marta.
  - August: Siege of Cartagena (1815) occurs during the independence war of Colombia, losing 1/3 of the population.
  - Population: 18.708
- 1816
  - Pablo Morillo returns to Cartagena, in the so-called "reconquest".
  - The nine martyrs are written off by the court-martial, accusing them of betrayal to the Spanish crown.
- 1821
  - Royalists surrender Cartagena to Simón Bolivar's forces after a 15-month siege.
  - Cartagena becomes capital of the Magdalena department.
- 1824 - War of independence finishes.
- 1827 - University of Cartagena established.
- 1835 - 11.929 inhabitants, population decreased significantly since the independence.
- 1843 - Bartolomé Calvo Library founded.
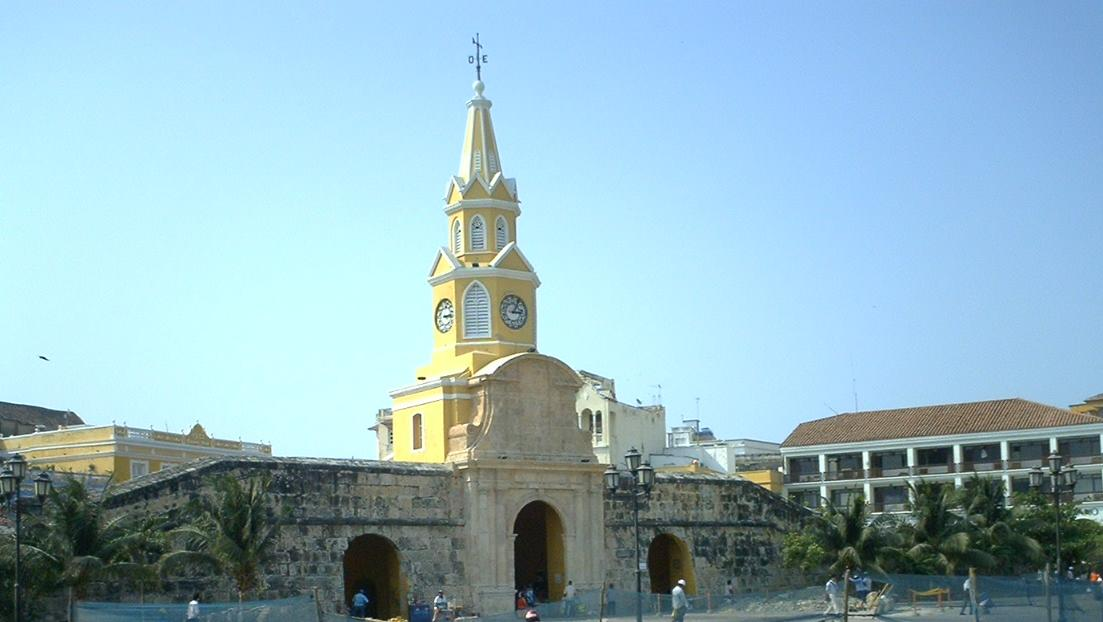
  Torre del Reloj (clock tower).
- 1849
  - Cholera plague hits Cartagena, 1/3 of the population decease.
  - El Porvenir newspaper begins publication.
- 1850 - La Republica newspaper begins publication.
- 1857 - The province of Cartagena is designated the name of Bolívar department, in honor to Simón Bolívar.
- 1870 - El camellón de los Mártires (median strip) built, making a social place for the Cartagenero.
- 1885 - The ermitage of El cabrero is built by the 4 times president Rafael Nuñez for his wife.
- 1888 - A republican-style clock tower, Torre del reloj (Cartagena) is built over the entrance of the wall.
- 1889 - Public Library José Fernandez de Madrid opens.
- 1891 - El Espinal, El Cabrero, Manga and Pie de La Popa, become townships.
- 1892 - Dispute on the terrains of La Boquilla.
- 1894
  - Cartagena's railway inaugurated, connecting the capital of the Bolivar department to the Magdalena river.
  - Muelle de la Machina (dock) inaugurated.
- 1896 - Bolivar statue erected in Bolívar Park (Cartagena, Colombia).
- 1898
  - After a big depression, economy recuperates. Volume of exportation: 34.653 tons.
  - The railway pier was lengthened 120 ft.

== 20th century - Republican era ==
- 1904 - Mercado de Getsemaní (public market building) inaugurated.
- 1905
  - The wall gate "Paz y progreso" is opened while the controversial "murallicidio".
  - Urbanization in the Manga island starts, it is held by Henrique Luis Román who also built the H.L Román bridge. Connecting Getsemaní and Manga.
  - Population: 14,000. (official estimate).
- 1907 - Bolivar bank building inaugurated.
- 1909 - Industrial park "El limbo" operates.
- 1911 - Teatro Heredia and Centenary Park (Cartagena) opens.
- 1912 - Demographic rate peaks to 3.2% until 1951. Important immigration to the city takes place.
- 1915 - Chamber of Commerce of Cartagena founded, 150 companies registered.
- 1918 - Population: 50.000
- 1920
  - "Compañia Colombiana de Navegación Aerea" (airline) builds an airport in the terrains of Bocagrande.
  - Club Cartagena opens.
- 1923 - An oil pipeline is built between "Las Infantas" camp in Santander and Cartagena's bay.
- 1928
  - Banco de la Republica [national bank) building inaugurated, designed by the recognized Belgian architect, Joseph Martens.
  - The Spirit of Saint Louis lands in Cartagena's airport.
- 1930
  - SCADTA (airline) builds an airfield in the Manzanillo island.
  - The Andean corporation urbanizes Bocagrande's peninsula giving shelter and entertainment to its workers.
- 1931
  - Fire in "La Machina" port.
  - US president Franklin D. Roosevelt visits Cartagena.
- 1934
  - Port of Cartagena inaugurated.
  - September: Naval base "ARC Bolívar" is inaugurated in Bocagrande.
  - Miss Colombia beauty pageant begins.
- 1938
  - Population: 73,190.
  - Water bombing from canal del Dique, and water purification in Piedra de Bolívar starts.
- 1939 - Club de Pesca of Cartagena (fishing club of Cartagena) founded in the San Sebastián del Pastelillo Fort.
- 1941 - the Caribe Hotel in business.
- 1947
  - LANSA (Colombia) (airline) builds two runways in the Crespo suburb. Called "Airport of Crespo".
  - Estadio Once de Noviembre (stadium) opens.
- 1948 - El Universal newspaper begins publication.
- 1951
  - Service of Cartagena's railroad is suspended due to navigability through Canal del Dique.
  - Population: 128,877.
- 1956 - Cartagena Refinery of oil commissioned.
- 1958 - Estadio Jaime Morón León (stadium) opens.
- 1959 - Cartagena's historic center is declared a national monument.
- 1960 - Cartagena Film Festival begins.
- 1961
  - Comfenalco (Compensation fund of Cartagena) established.
  - Navy cadet school Almirante Padilla moved to the Manzanillo island.
- 1965 - Fire destroys the Mercado de Getsemaní (public market).
- 1967 - Mamonal industrial complex consolidated.
- 1968 - Santander Avenue inaugurated, an important avenue which rounds the Cartagena wall.
- 1970 - Universidad Tecnologica de Bolivar first private university in the city, founded.
- 1973 - Population: 292,512.
- 1974
  - Private-state enterprise Ecopetrol takes the administration of the Cartagena oil refinery.
  - Statue of India Catalina erected in La Matuna.
- 1977 - New public market Bazurto is built. The building is recognized as architectural heritage of Colombia.
- 1978 - The semi destroyed Mercado de Getsemaní is finally demolished.
- 1979 - Centro de conveciones Julio Cesar Turbay Ayala (convention center) starts its construction.
- 1980
  - Hilton Cartagena inaugurated, becoming the first Hilton Hotel in Colombia.
  - La Vitrola restaurant in business.
- 1982
  - Caribbean Music Festival begins.
  - Museo del Oro (Cartagena) (gold museum) inaugurated.
- 1984
  - Cartagena's colonial walled city and fortress designated a UNESCO World Heritage Site.
  - Archivo Historico de Cartagena (historical registry of Cartagena) established.
  - Romancing The Stone filmed in Cartagena's historic center.
- 1985
  - García Márquez's fictional Love in the Time of Cholera published.
  - Population: 513,986.
- 1986 - The airport of Crespo is renamed as Rafael Nuñez in tribute to the centenary of the constitution.
- 1991 - Cartagena is declared touristic and cultural district of Colombia.
- 1993 - Sociedad Portuaria de Cartagena acquires the administration of Cartagena's port.
- 1996 - SACSA (airline) acquires the administration of the Rafael Núñez International Airport.
- 1997 - Jorge Artel Library is opened, it serves to the southwestern districts, the poorest ones.
- 1999 - The American Hispanic Culture Library opens.

== 21st century ==
- 2003 – Transcaribe transit system construction begins.
- 2005
  - 875.730 inhabitants according to national census.
  - Torre de la Escollera construction begins.
- 2006
  - July: XX Central American and Caribbean games celebrated in Cartagena.
  - Ecopetrol and Glencore establish the Sociedad Refinería de Cartagena SA (Cartagena's refinery society).
- 2008
  - Judith Pinedo Flórez becomes mayor.
  - Caribe Plaza opens.
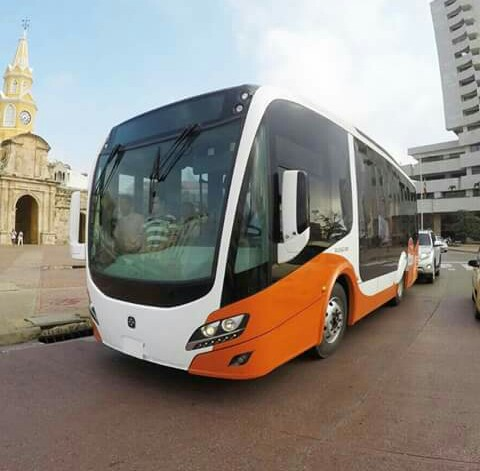
- Transcaribe bus
  2012
  - April: Summit of the Americas held in Cartagena.
  - Campo Elías Terán becomes mayor, succeeded by Carlos Otero Gerdts.
  - Mall Plaza El Castillo opens.
- 2013
  - Marine outfall inaugurated
  - Dionisio Vélez becomes mayor
- 2014
  - Cartagena's population reaches 1 million inhabitants
  - Bocagrande Plaza opens.
- 2015
  - August: Puerto Bahía specialized docks for hydrocarbons gas liquids movement inaugurated.
  - October: Modernization and ampliation of the Cartagena's refinery finishes.
  - November: Transcaribe BRT starts operating.
  - December: Sunken 18th century Spanish galleon San José rediscovered offshore.
  - December 10: Port of Buenavista, located in Mamonal industrial district, inaugurated.
- 2016
  - Bolívar Department, which's capital is Cartagena, was the department that grew economically the most in 2016 with 11,4%, much higher than the 2% national average.
  - February: The planified city, Serena Del Mar, starts its construction in the north of Cartagena.
  - February 27: Mamonal specialized docks for carbon movement, inaugurated.
  - April: Crespo's tunnel inaugurated.
  - July: First Neopanamax ship docks at Cartagena's harbor.
  - September: Peace accords between the Colombian Government and the FARC are signed in the Turbay Ayala convention center, assembling presidents from different countries, and big personalities such as Ban Ki-moon.
  - December: Estelar Hotel inaugurated in Bocagrande, becoming the tallest building in Cartagena with 202 m (662 ft).
  - Population 1,013,389
- 2017
  - February: Children's Baseball stadium, Mono Judas Araújo, rebuilt
  - May: Colombia's General Attorney's Office suspended mayor Manolo Duque from his charge because of corruption investigations. Duque being found guilty and imprisoned later. Sergio Londoño Zurek would become Cartagena's in-charge mayor until atypical elections were held.
  - October: 9 members of Cartagena's council are investigated and called to the courts in January 2018.
- 2018
  - 5 km long Viaducto Cienaga de la Virgen (bridge) inaugurated, reducing travel time from downtown to north Cartagena and Barranquilla

== See also ==
- History of Cartagena, Colombia
- List of mayors of Cartagena
- List of governors of the Province of Cartagena

Other cities in Colombia:

- Timeline of Bogotá
- Timeline of Cali
- Timeline of Ocaña, Colombia

== Bibliography ==
=== in English ===
- Josiah Conder (1830), "Cartagena", The Modern Traveller, London: J.Duncan
- "Cartagena". Commercial Directory of Latin America. Washington DC: Bureau of the American Republics. 1892.
- M. de Moreira (1908). "Cartagena". Catholic Encyclopedia. New York: New York, The Encyclopedia Press.
- "Cartagena (Colombia)" . Encyclopædia Britannica. Vol. 5 (11th ed.). 1910. pp. 411–412.
- William Alfred Hirst (1915), "Cartagena", Guide to South America, New York: Macmillan Company
- Joel Streicker (1997). "Spatial Reconfigurations, Imagined Geographies, and Social Conflicts in Cartagena, Colombia". Cultural Anthropology. 12 (1): 109–128. doi:10.1525/can.1997.12.1.109. JSTOR 656615.
- David Marley (2005), "Cartagena", Historic Cities of the Americas, Santa Barbara, Calif: ABC-CLIO, ISBN 1576070271
- Jane Landers (2013). "African Landscape of Seventeenth-Century Cartagena and Its Hinterlands". In Jorge Canizares-Esguerra; et al. (eds.). Black Urban Atlantic in the Age of the Slave Trade. University of Pennsylvania Press. ISBN 978-0-8122-0813-9.

=== in Spanish ===
- José P. Urueta (1880). Cartagena y sus cercanías, guia descriptiva de la capital de estado soberano de Bolivar [Cartagena and its surroundings, descriptive guide to the capital of the sovereign state of Bolivar] (in Spanish). Cartagena: Donaldo E. Grau.
- Eduardo Lemaitre. Breve historia de Cartagena (Cartagena, 1958). In Spanish.
- Eduardo Lemaitre. Historia general de Cartagena. Bogotá: Banco de la República, 1983. In Spanish.
- Maruja Redondo Gómez (2004). "Proceso cronologico de estructuracion urbana". Cartagena de Indias: cinco siglos de evolución urbanística (in Spanish). U. Jorge Tadeo Lozano. ISBN 978-958-9029-63-3.
- Atlas historico de Cartagena
- Cartagena de Indias, visión panoramica
- Banco de la Republica, Cartagena
