= Schools in South Australia =

Schools in South Australia may refer to:

== Lists ==
- List of schools in South Australia
- List of Aboriginal and Anangu schools in South Australia
- List of boarding schools in South Australia
- List of boarding schools#South Australia
- List of largest South Australian schools
- List of schools offering the International Baccalaureate Diploma Programme#South Australia
- List of schools offering the International Baccalaureate Primary Years Programme#South Australia
- List of Special interest high schools in South Australia

== Categories ==
- Category:Schools in South Australia
- Category:Boarding schools in South Australia
- Category:High schools in South Australia
- Category:Primary schools in South Australia
- Category:Private schools in South Australia
- Category:Public schools in South Australia
- Category:Special interest high schools in South Australia

== See also ==
- List of dental schools in Australia#South Australia
- Independent Schools Sports Association (South Australia)
- Independent Girls' Schools Sports Association (South Australia)
- SACSA (South Australian Curriculum Standards and Accountability framework)
- Technical and Further Education
- List of Lutheran schools in Australia#South Australia
- Junior School Heads Association of Australia#South Australia
- Head of the River (Australia)#South Australia
- SABRENet
- South Australian Certificate of Education
