= Timeline of Ocaña, Colombia =

The following is a timeline of the history of the city of Ocaña, Colombia.

== Prior to 20th century ==
- 1570 - Ocaña is founded by the captain Francisco Fernandez de Contreras.
- 1575 - Ocaña is given the city title.
- 1584 - San Francisco Church built.
- 1596 - San Agustin Temple built.
- 1680 - Plaza del 29 de Mayo restored.
- 1749 - Virgen de Torcoroma church built.
- 1813 - The Campaña Admirable troops are formed by Simon Bolivar, during the independence war.
- 1820 - The martyrs of Ocaña are written off by the royalist guerrilla Los Colorados.
- 1826 - El dulce nombre church built.
- 1828 - The Constituent Convention is held in the San Francisco Temple, in this convention the Gran Colombia is dissolved.
- 1849 - Ocaña and near populations found the province of Ocaña.
- 1851 - Columna de la libertad de los esclavos (Freedom of slaves column) erected at the center of the Plaza del 29 de Mayo.
- 1875 - Ermitage of Nuestra Señora de las gracias de Torcoroma built.
- 1889 - La Presentación School opens.
- 1891 - Claridad Santa Ana Hospital inaugurated.
- 1893 - La jabonería (soap factory) in business.
- 1894 - Club Ocaña inaugurated.

== 20th century ==
- 1916 - The Jose Eusebio Caro School built.
- 1919 - First vehicle in Ocaña.
- 1929 - A 46 km long gondola lift is built between Ocaña and Gamarra, connecting Ocaña to the Magdalena River.
- 1932 - The Cristo Rey statue erected in the Cristo Rey mount.
- 1934 - The jesuit community leaves the city.
- 1937 - The San Francisco Temple is recognized as national monument.
- 1940
  - San Antonio Nursing home inaugurated.
  - Bust of Francisco de Paula Santander erected in Plaza 29 de Mayo.
- 1944 - Rural School of Ocaña founded.
- 1945
  - Home School of Ocaña is founded.
  - Commerce Club of Ocaña established.
  - Morales Berti teather inaugurated.
- 1946
  - Ocaña-Cucuta alternate road inaugurated, covering other municipalities and townships.
  - First edition of Ocaña's Carnival.
  - Club de leones established.
- 1955 - Emiro Quintero Cañizares Hospital built.
- 1959 - First edition of Desfile de los Genitores.
- 1962 - Kennedy School inaugurated.
- 1970 - Aeropuerto Aguas Claras (airport) built.
- 1972
  - February: Urbanization in the actual neighborhood of Buenos Aires is held by Pío Quesada.
  - October: TELECOM (Colombian company of telecommunications) headquarters opens in Ocaña.
- 1974 - Desfile de los Genitores reorganized.
- 1975 - Headquarters of the Francisco de Paula Santander university start operating.
- 1976 - Headquarters of the national educational institute SENA built.
- 1977 - Public Library of Ocaña opens, in the San Francisco cloister.

== 21st century ==
- 2009 - State airline Satena restarts air traffic in the Aeropuerto Aguas Claras with a daily flight to Cucuta, Capital of Norte de Santander.

== See also ==
- Ocaña, Norte de Santander

Other cities in Colombia:

- Timeline of Bogotá
- Timeline of Cali
- Timeline of Cartagena, Colombia

== Bibliography ==
=== In Spanish ===
- http://academiaocana.blogspot.com.co/
- http://viveocana.com/historia/
