= Centro Comercial Santafé =

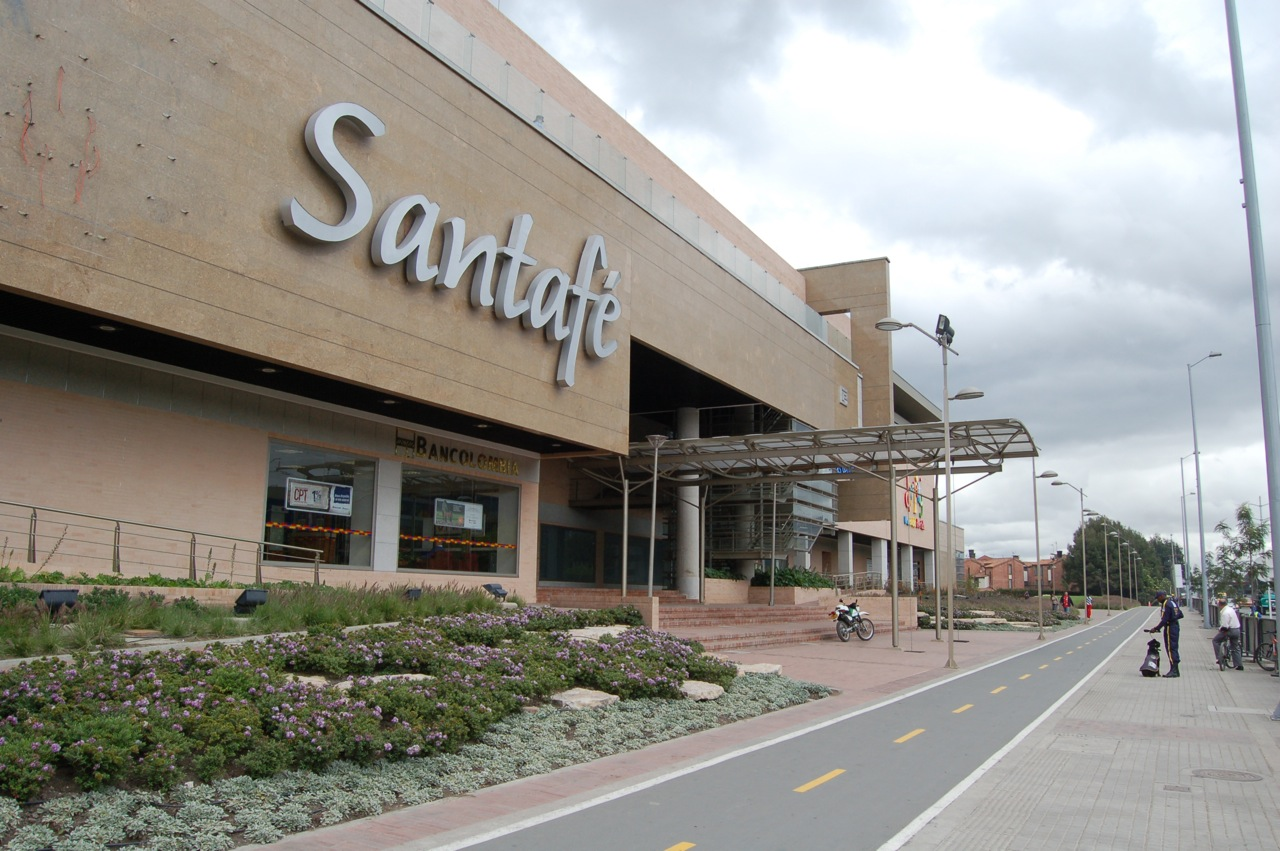
- Location: Bogotá, Colombia
- Coordinates: 4°45′43″N 74°02′47″W
- Address: Autopista Norte con Calle 183
- Opened: May 13, 2006; 20 years ago
- Num. of stores: 572
- Num. of anchor tenants: 3
- Floors: 3
- Parking: 4100

The Centro Comercial Santafé (English: Santafé Shopping Center) is a mall located in Bogotá, Colombia. It is the fourth largest shopping mall in Colombia (the largest is Centro Mayor in Bogotá), and the fifth in Latin America, surpassed by Leste Aricanduva Mall in São Paulo, Brazil. It opened on May 13, 2006. It is 250,000 square metres or 2,700,000 square feet in area. The mall has 572 shops, including an open foodcourt with 26 restaurants that has a seating for 1,500 people. The mall also has 10 cinemas, 4,100 parking stalls, and an auditorium.

The mall is in the neighborhood of Suba, which is in northeastern Bogotá on the North Highway on 183 street. The mall has access by bus from the municipalities surrounding the city and along the route system of TransMilenio from the Portal North, "2.1 Mirandela."

The mall is divided into seven squares, which are the Venezuela Plaza, Colombia Plaza, Ecuador Plaza, Peru Plaza, France Plaza, Italy Plaza, and Zona MET. It has 3 floors and two lower levels for parking.

The larger stores in the complex are Jumbo (in Plaza Francia), Falabella (in Plaza Italia), and the Cine Colombia, and Miniso (in Plaza Italia). The complex also includes a wide selection of restaurants.

Another Santafé Commercial Center was opened in Medellín in May 2010.

== Restaurants ==
There are restaurants such as Crepes & Waffles, Frisby, McDonald's and Kokoriko.

== See also ==
- Centro Andino
