= Timeline of Cali =

The following is a timeline of the history of the city of Cali, Colombia.

== Prior to 20th century ==
- 1536 – Cali founded by Spaniard Sebastián de Belalcázar.
- 1747 – Capilla de San Antonio (Cali) (church) built.
- 1802 – Metropolitan Cathedral of Cali built.
- 1810
  - July 3: Cali declares independence from Spanish colonial rule.
  - Population: 6,385.
- 1811 – Cali joins the Confederated cities of the Cauca Valley.
- 1890 – Market Plaza built (approximate date).

== 20th century ==
- 1906 - Population: 16,000 (estimate).
- 1910 – Catholic Diocese of Cali, regional administrative Valle del Cauca Department, and Cali Chamber of Commerce Quiénes somos I Cámara de Comercio de Cali established.
- 1912 – Deportivo Cali (sport club) formed.
- 1913 – Cayzedo statue erected in the Plaza de Cayzedo.
- 1914 – Buenaventura-Cali railway begins operating.
- 1927 – Cali City Theatre opens.
- 1931 – Teatro Jorge Isaacs (theatre) opens.
- 1933 – Palacio Nacional (Cali) built.
- 1937 – Estadio Olímpico Pascual Guerrero (stadium) opens.
- 1938 – Population: 88,366.
- 1942 – Iglesia la Ermita (Cali) (church) rebuilt.
- 1945 – University of Valle established.
- 1946 – October: Economic unrest.
- 1950 – El País newspaper begins publication.
- 1951 – Population: 284,186.
- 1953
  - La Estación (Cali) (railway station) opens.
  - Biblioteca Departamental Jorge Garcés Borrero (library) established.
- 1956
  - Dynamite explosion.
  - La Tertulia Museum founded.
- 1957
  - Cali Fair begins.
  - Cañaveralejo bullring opens.
- 1968 – Farallones de Cali National Park established near city.
- 1969 – Cali Zoo founded.
- 1970
  - Universidad Autónoma de Occidente established.
  - Pontifical Xavierian University begins operating in Cali.
- 1971
  - Palmaseca Airport, Coliseo El Pueblo (arena) and Velódromo Alcides Nieto Patiño open.
  - 1971 Pan American Games held in Cali.
- 1973 – Population: 898,253 city; 923,264 urban agglomeration.
- 1974 – Central de Transportes de Cali built.
- 1977 – Criminal Cali Cartel active.
- 1979 – Universidad Icesi founded.
- 1980
  - Unicentro Cali shopping center opens.
  - Procali NGO association established.
- 1984 – Cali Tower built.
- 1985 – Population: 1,369,331.
- 1990
  - Cali Cultural Center built.
  - Loma de la Cruz Artisan Park established.
- 1992
  - Rodrigo Guerrero becomes mayor.
  - Population: 1,759,139.
- 1995
  - December 20: Airplane crash in nearby Buga.
  - Feria del Libro Pacífico (book fair) begins.
- 1996 – El Gato del Río sculpture erected at Avenida del Río.
- 1999 – Church kidnapping.

== 21st century ==
- 2001 – Jardin Botanico de Cali (garden) established.
- 2002 – April 12: Valle del Cauca Deputies hostage crisis begins.
- 2004 – Criminal Los Rastrojos active.
- 2005 – Population: 2,119,908.
- 2007 – Centro de Eventos Valle del Pacifico built.
- 2008 – Caliwood film museum opens.
- 2009 – Masivo Integrado de Occidente (transit system) begins operating.
- 2010 – Estadio Deportivo Cali (stadium) opens.
- 2016 – Population: 2,394,925.
- 2017 – Starbucks begins operations.

== See also ==
- Cali history
- History of Cali
- List of mayors of Cali

Other cities in Colombia:

- Timeline of Bogotá
- Timeline of Cartagena, Colombia
- Timeline of Ocaña, Colombia

== Bibliography ==
- Isaac F. Holton (1857), "Cali", New Granada: Twenty Months in the Andes, New York: Harper & Brothers, OCLC 2422862
- "Cali" . Encyclopædia Britannica. Vol. 5 (11th ed.). 1910. p. 3.
- Rakesh Mohan (1994), Understanding the Developing Metropolis: Lessons from the City Study of Bogotá and Cali, Colombia (2nd ed.), Oxford University Press / World Bank, ISBN 9780195208825
- Bank, World (2002). Cali, Colombia: Toward a City Development Strategy. Washington DC: World Bank. ISBN 978-0-8213-5174-1.
- Politics and Security in Three Colombian Cities, London: Crisis States Research Centre, 2009 – via International Relations and Security Network (about Bogota, Cali, Medellin)
