= History of Bogotá =

The history of Bogotá refers to the history of the Colombian capital Bogotá. The area that is now Bogotá was first populated by groups of indigenous people that migrated from mesoamerica. Among these groups were the Muisca that settled on the Altiplano Cundiboyacense plateau in what is now the departments of Cundinamarca and Boyacá. With the arrival of the Spanish colonizers the area was developed into a major settlement founded by Gonzalo Jiménez de Quesada in 1538, and became capital of the Spanish Empire provinces and the seat of the Viceroyalty of New Granada. With independence, Bogotá became the capital of the Gran Colombia, and -subsequently- of the modern Republic of Colombia.

== Pre-Columbian era ==
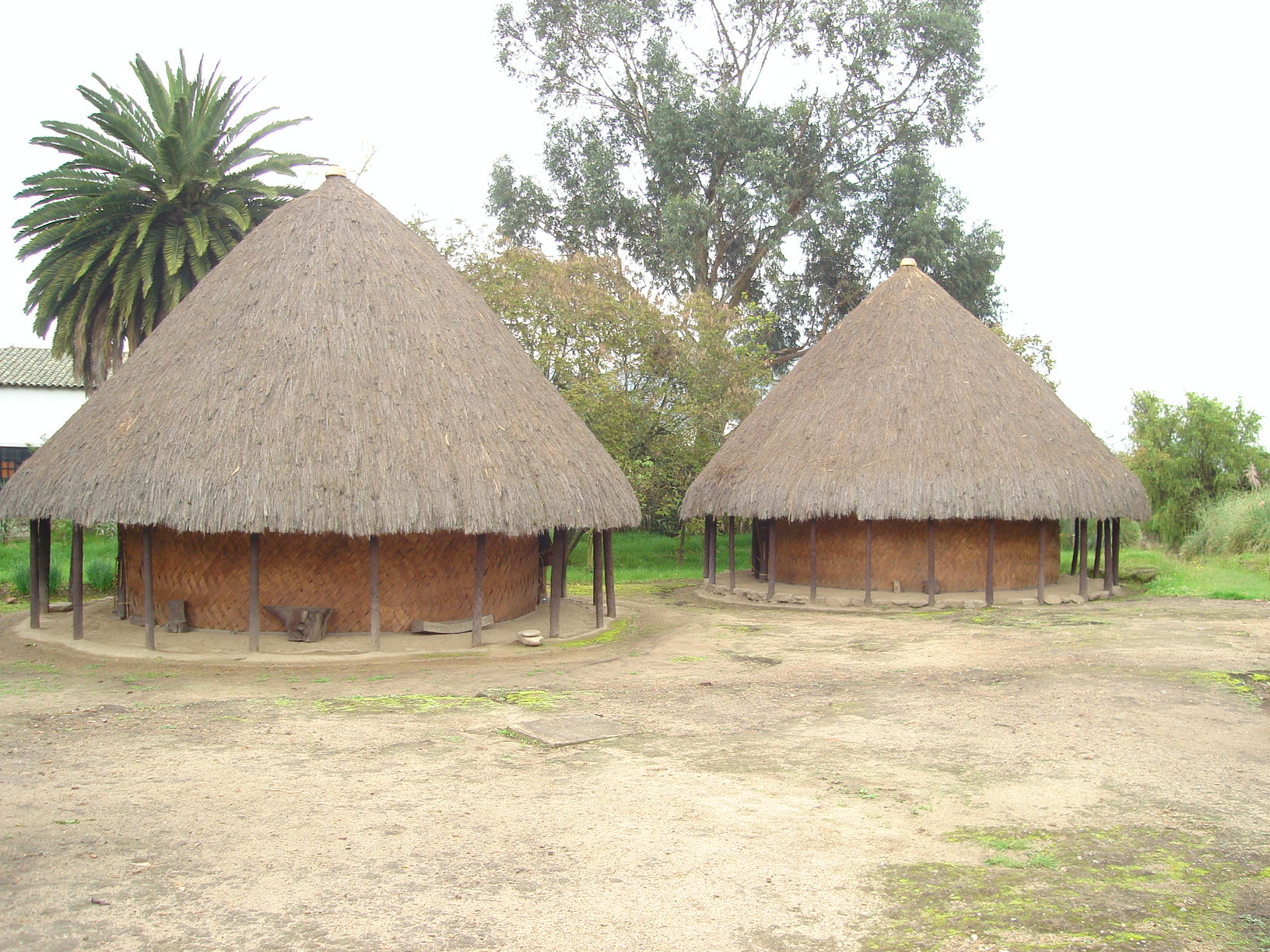
Model of ancient Muisca houses in the Archaeology Museum of Sogamoso. These types of housing were present in what is now Bogotá.

The first populations inhabiting the present-day Metropolitan Area of Bogotá were hunter-gatherers in the late Pleistocene. Dating to around 12,500 BP, the oldest evidence of human activity was discovered in El Abra, north of Zipaquirá. Other excavations in a rock shelter southwest of the city in Soacha provided ages of ~11,000 BP; Tequendama. Since roughly 0 AD, the local Muisca people domesticated guinea pigs as a source of dietary meat. The people inhabiting the Bogotá savanna in the late 15th century were the Muisca, speaking Muysccubun, a member of the Chibcha language family. At the arrival of the Spanish colonizers, the Muisca population was estimated to sit between 110,000 to two million people. The Muisca occupied the mild-climate highlands between the Sumapaz mountains to the southwest and the Sierra Nevada del Cocuy in the northeast. They lived within an approximate area of 25,000 km^{2} (9,700 sq mi), which comprised Bogotá's high plateau, the current Boyacá department portion, and a small part of Santander. The most fertile lands were ancient Pleistocene lake beds, remnants of Lake Humboldt, forming the Bogotá savanna, an area called Bacatá, and regions irrigated by the Bogotá, Suárez and Chicamocha Rivers.

Politically, the area formed part of the Muisca Confederation with the northern ruler called zaque (ruling from Hunza, present-day Tunja) and the southern ruler, based in Bacatá, the zipa. The Muisca were predominantly farmers and traders and formed a dispersed population occupying numerous small villages and settlements with wooden and clay houses, called bohíos by the Spanish. The iraca of sacred City of the Sun Sugamuxi was the principal religious leader. Other rulers were Tundama in the city of the same name, now called Duitama and various independent caciques, mainly of Guatavita, Ubaté, Ubaque and Vélez. The original hunter-gatherer population of the Herrera Period, predating the Muisca, slowly changed into a sedentary community based on agriculture. The people cultivated maize, potatoes, beans, tomatoes, tubers, such as yuca, tobacco, arracacha, sweet potatoes and various fruits and vegetables. The Muisca people were called "Salt People", due to their extraction of salt from brines in large pots. The main salt mines were and are still in Zipaquirá, Nemocón and Tausa, at the northern edge of the Bogotá savanna. Emeralds were mined in Chivor and Somondoco and traded with the Muzo, who were called the "Emerald People". Cotton was cultivated by the higher-altitude neighbours, such as the Lache and U'wa to the north.

=== Bacatá in Muisca history ===
History of the Muisca
Altiplano	Muisca	Art	Architecture	Astronomy	Cuisine	El Dorado	Subsistence	Women	Conquest

=== Mythology and religion ===
Chía was Zipa's territory ceremonial center, a place designed for moon worship, while the Zaque's ceremonial center was Sogamoso, where the Sun temple was located. Apparently, the major Muisca priest's function was astronomic observation. Numerous archeological monuments in the form of stone columns witness the relation, such as "Cojines del Diablo" (Devil's Cushions) two large discs carved high up in the rock within Tunja urban perimeter, which were probably Moon observation sites. At Saquenzipa, ceremonial center near Villa de Leyva, some 25 large cylindrical columns aligned in the east-west direction stand: from this place, on summer solstice day the sun rises exactly over Iguaque lake from where Bachué goddess emerged as the legend tells.

Bochica, the civilizing God taught them manual arts, gave them moral standards, and subsequently saved them from deluge and Sabana flood by breaking the rock and letting the water flow to form Tequendama falls. The goddess Chia was the moon, Zuhé the sun. They worshiped other various astral gods. For the Muisca, lakes were sacred places where they had their ceremonies. Their most important myths and legends mention Guatavita, Siecha, Tota, Fúquene, and Iguacu lakes, where gold and ceramic gifts have been found. They also worshiped the dead, nobles and chiefs were mummified and buried with all their belongings.

=== Gold-working and ceramics ===
Although the Muisca Confederation had no gold, they obtained it from trading with other tribes. They manufactured diverse pieces, the most outstanding are tunjos; small anthropomorphic or zoomorphic figures they offered to their gods. Among the diverse techniques, they used to manufacture those pieces are lost wax, hammering, and repouseé. Gold objects served for funerary and sacred sacrifices. The Muisca also made necklaces, bracelets, earrings, pectorals, nose rings, and other pieces they used to decorate themselves with. The Museo del Oro and other private collection museums still preserve those pieces. The Muisca elaborated on clothes and produced ceramics.

== Spanish conquest of the Muisca ==
=== Gonzalo Jiménez de Quesada expedition ===
From 1533, a belief persisted that the Río Grande de la Magdalena was the trail to the South Sea, to Peru, legendary El Dorado. Such was the target of Gonzalo Jiménez de Quesada, the Granadanian conquistador who left Santa Marta on 6 April 1536 with 800 soldiers, heading towards the interior of current Colombia. The expedition divided into two groups, one under Quesada's command to move on land, and the other commanded by Diego de Urbino would go upriver in four brigantine ships to eventually meet Quesada's troops at the site named Tora de las Barrancas Bermejas. When they arrived, they heard news about Indians inhabiting the south and making large salt cakes used to trade for wild cotton and fish. Jiménez de Quesada decided to abandon the route to Peru and cross the mountain in search of salt villages. They saw crops, trails, white salt cakes and then huts where they found corn, yucca and beans. From Tora, the expedition went up the Opón River and found indigenous people wearing very finely painted cotton mantles. When they arrived in Muisca territories in the Andean Plateau, on 9 March 1537, of the expedition leaving Santa Marta, only 162 men were left.

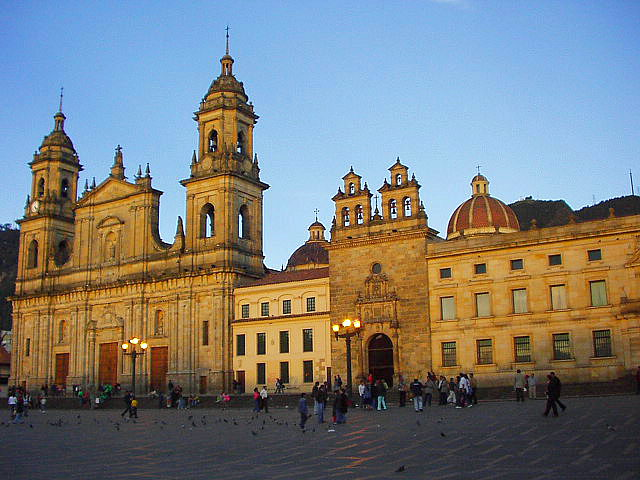
Primatial Cathedral of Bogotá

Along their journey they took a large amount of gold and emeralds. In Hunza the Spanish submitted zaque Quemuenchatocha and headed towards Sogamoso, where they raided and accidentally set the Sun Temple on fire.

On March 22, 1537 the Spanish arrived from the north crossing the salt mine villages Nemocón and Zipaquirá to a place they named Valle de los Alcázarea (Valley of the Fortress). Already in Muisca territory they found good roads and moved southwest. In a few days only they crossed several villages, among them Lenguazaque and Suesca. They continued through Cajicá, Chía and Suba, the start of the southern Muisca zipazgo of Bacatá, where they found an abandoned Bacatá . The zipa of Bacatá, Tisquesusa had fled the capital of his kingdom to the north (Cajicá), where he would be killed by a Spanish soldier.

== Spanish colonization ==
=== Founding ===
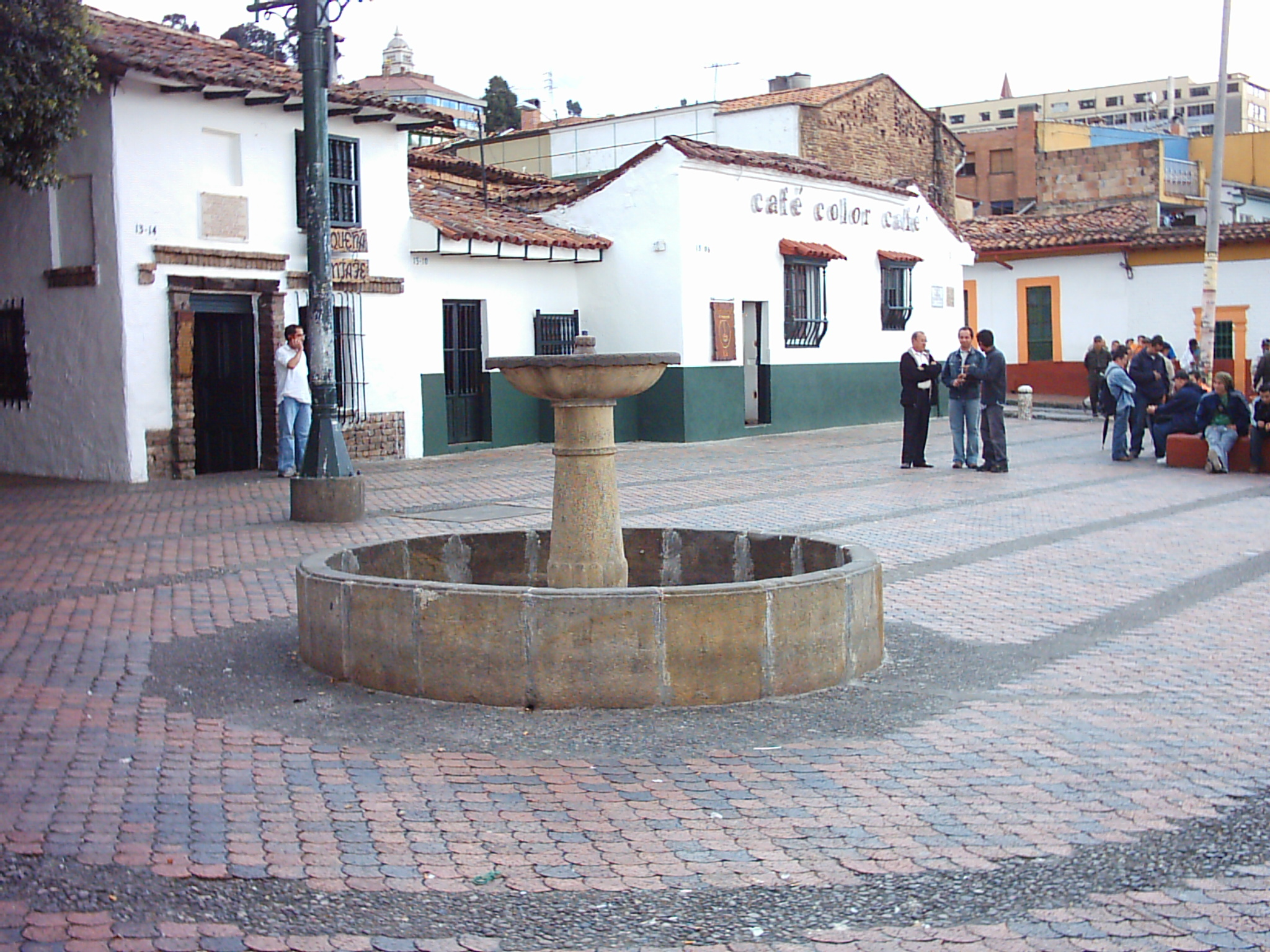
The fountain of Quevedo, one of the possible foundation sites of Bogotá

Following conquerors motto to found and to populate, De Quesada decided to build an urban settlement to live in good order and under stable government. To the east on the foothills they found an Indian village named Teusaquillo near the residence of the zipa, supplied with water, wood and planting land and protected from winds by the mountains of Monserrate and Guadalupe.

Although no document recording the exact date of city foundation has been found, August 7, 1538 is accepted as the foundation date. According to tradition, that day friar Domingo de las Casas held the first sermon in a straw hut built near the current cathedral of Santander park. The Spanish colony was named New Kingdom of Granada, with as capital Santa Fe, later Santa Fe de Bogotá and later shortened to Bogotá, based on the Chibcha name for the southern Muisca capital; Bacatá.

=== Urban design ===
The urban design consisted of squares and from that time the one hundred meters per lienzo de cuadra prevails. Traverse streets (east–west) were 7 metres (23 ft) and current carreras 10 metres (33 ft). In 1553, the Main Plaza—now Plaza de Bolívar—was moved to its current site and the first cathedral construction on the eastern side began. On the other sides the Chapter and the Royal Hearing were located. The street joining the Major Plaza and Herbs Plaza—currently Santander park—was named «Calle Real» (Royal Street) now Carrera Seventh.

=== Population of Santa Fe ===
Formed by whites, mestizos, indigenous Muisca, and slaves; from the second half of the 16th century the population began to grow rapidly. The census of 1789 recorded 18,161 inhabitants and by 1819 the city population amounted to 30,000 inhabitants distributed in 195 blocks. Importance grew when the diocese was created. Up until 1585, the only parish was the cathedral, later on Las Nieves to the north and Santa Bárbara south of the central square were created.

=== Government and administration ===
City mayor and the Chapter formed by two council men assisted by the constable and the chief of police governed the city. For better administering these domains in April 1550 the Audience of Santafé de Bogotá was organized, for hearers to act. From that time the city became the capital and the home of New Kingdom of Granada government. Fourteen years later, in 1564, the Spanish Crown designated the first Royal Audience Chairman; Andrés Díaz Venero de Leyva. The Kingdom of New Granada became a Viceroyalty in 1739 and kept that condition until Liberator Simón Bolívar achieved independence from Spain in 1819.

=== Religion ===
After dominating indigenous populations by war, conquest by religion began assisted by religious communities established in the entire Colombian territory from the 16th century, Churches and convents were built for the Franciscan, Dominican, Augustine communities and later on in 1604, Jesuits, Capuchin monks and Clarisse, Dominican and Barefooted Carmelite nuns. Such communities marked the spirit and uses of Santafereños, since they exercised ideology, political and cultural domination only slightly reduced when in 1767, Carlos III of Spain ordered Jesuit expulsion from Spanish colonies in the Americas.

=== Educational centers ===
As for the rest of Spanish America, religious communities were fundamental in the field of education, which by order of the Crown took place in churches and convents. The first two universities are the deed of Dominican monks (1563 and 1573). In 1592 San Bartolomé seminar school was founded to provide higher education to Spanish children; Jesuits ruled the school, and in 1605 they founded the Maximum School located in one of the Major Plaza corners.

In 1580 Dominicans founded Pontificia Universidad of Santo Tomás de Aquino Arts and Philosophy school, and in 1621 Jesuits started San Francisco Javier or Javeriana University courses. In 1653 Fray Cristóbal de Torres founded Colegio Mayor de Nuestra Señora del Rosario. In 1783 the first educational community and the first school for woman education were founded in New Granada: La Enseñanza school ruled by the community of María. From that time school lessons for women started, a right up to then reserved to men.

=== Fine arts ===
During colonial centuries two trends were clear, which common source was formed by religious topics: culta, highly influenced by metropolitan 17th-century painting counted in the Santa Fe school with outstanding individuals, for instance Baltasar de Figueroa, the head of a painters dynasty, who created and maintained the school where Gregorio Vázquez de Arce y Ceballos (1638–1711), was formed, perhaps the most outstanding person of the time; and popular, formed by more ingenuous painters free from influences of the time, who did not belong to any school. They interpreted biblical scenes, the life of saints and Christ and the Virgin life episodes in carved wood or painted but in a more free style.

Wood carving is highly positioned within plastic production of the time and the maximum expression is found in retable adorning most Colombian churches, for instance San Francisco Church main altar retable, mostly carved by Ignacio García de Ascucha.

Pedro Laboria, Spaniard formed in Seville art schools who came to Bogotá, very young and lived here the rest of his life is one of the outstanding sculptors.

French influence dominating Spain during the 18th century when the Bourbon dynasty took the throne, also characterized American colonies artistic trends. By mid-century painting and decoration secularized in American colonies and French style marked government, high Creole burgess-ship and higher church hierarchy taste. Religious themes gave space to personal portraits. The best known painter of the time was Joaquín Gutiérrez, Viceroys portraitist.

=== Botanic expedition ===
The most important contribution of the time to scientific knowledge was the botanic expedition, with the objective of studying native flora. Started by order to Archbishop-Viceroy Caballero y Góngora under the direction of José Celestino Mutis and contributions from scientists as renowned as Francisco José de Caldas, Jorge Tadeo Lozano and Francisco Antonio Zea. Originally sited in Mariquita in 1791 and subsequently transferred to Santa Fe where it worked until 1816. Painters Francisco Javier Matiz and Pablo Antonio García who cooperated with the work left a series of carefully drawn precious illustrations in witness of research conducted. Famous naturalist Alexander von Humboldt has contributed to the knowledge of botany, geography and geology of Colombia and his name is celebrated in various locations throughout the country. Furthermore, the German scientist described the anthropology of the people, especially the remaining Muisca.

== Nineteenth century ==
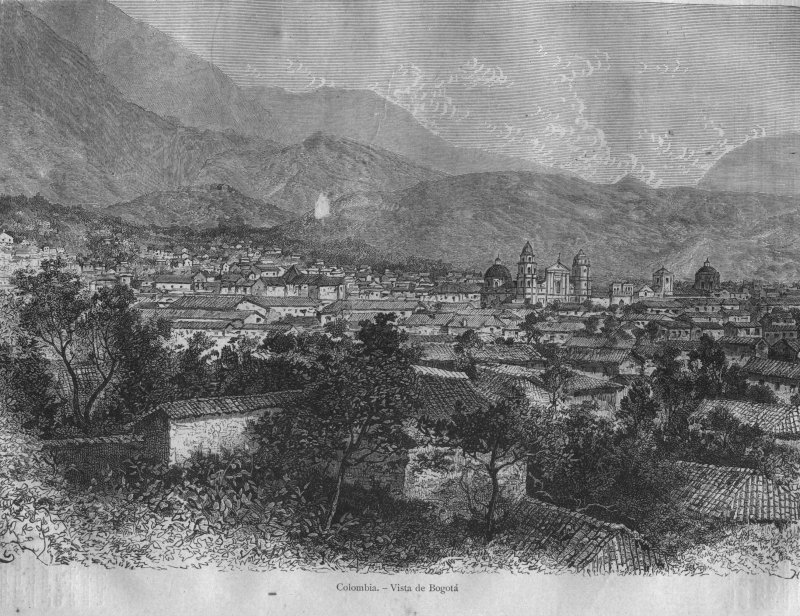
Illustration of Bogotá in 1887

=== Independence ===
Political uneasiness felt all over Spanish colonies in America was expressed in New Granada in many different ways accelerating the independence process. One of the most transcendent was the Revolution of Comuneros, a population riot started in Villa del Socorro —current Department of Santander—in March 1781. Spanish authorities refrained the riot and José Antonio Galán, the leader was executed. He however left an imprint followed in 1794 by Antonio Nariño, precursor of independence by translating and publishing in Santafé, the Rights or Men and the Citizen, and by July 20 movement leaders in 1810. Independence outcry originated in an apparently slight dispute between Creole and Spaniards over the loan of a flowerpot but became popular upraise.

The period comprised between 1810 and 1815 is known as “Patria Boba” (Silly Homeland), because during those years Creole fought among themselves seeking ideal government forms, initial ideological struggles began and the first two republican political parties—federalists and centralists—were formed.

=== Terror epoch and independence ===
In 1815 Pacifying Expedition commanded by Pablo Morillo arrived in New Granada, pretending to conquer the rebel colony. Repression times started then and extending until 1819. New Granada lived the Independence War period when egregious personalities lost their life but ended by triumphal liberator campaign commanded by Simón Bolívar and Francisco de Paula Santander who fought Battle of Vargas Swamp and Battle of Boyacá (1819) to seal independence.

=== Gran Colombia ===
In 1819, Simón Bolívar created Gran Colombia, a national state formed by Venezuela, Nueva Granada and Quito, dissolved later in 1830, the same year Bolívar died in Santa Marta.

=== Mid-century revolution ===
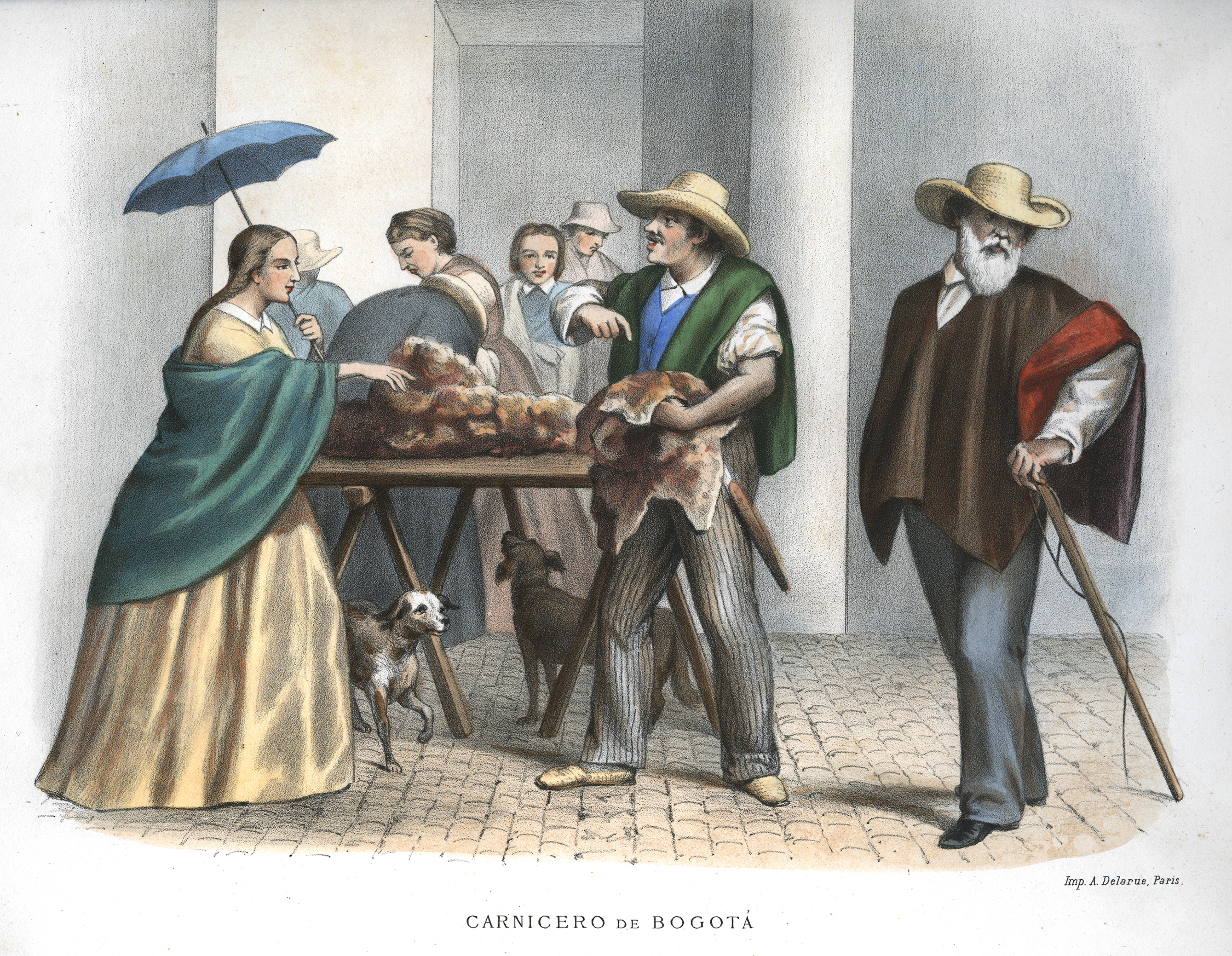
A butcher in Bogotá selling meat around 1860

Between 1819 and 1849 no fundamental structures inherited from the colonial phase change had been seen. It was by the mid 19th century when a series of fundamental reforms took place, some of the most important being slavery abolition and religious, teaching, print and speech industry and trade freedom, among other. During the decade of the 70s Radicalism accentuated reforms and State, society and institutions perception was substantially modified. However, during the second half of the century the country faced permanent «pronouncements», fights between States and fractions and civil wars: the last and bloodier was the One Thousand Days War from 1899 to 1902.

=== Educational system ===
Independence achieved Bogotá continued enjoying the privilege of being the main educational and cultural center of the new nation.

In 1823, a few years after Gran Colombia organization, the Public Library, now National Library extended and modernized with new volumes and better facilities. The National Museum was founded. Those institutions were of great importance to new republic cultural development. From half century education secularization and expansion widened formation possibilities. The Central University was the first State school, precursor of current National University. Founded in 1867 and domiciled in Bogotá.

=== Geographic commission ===
Between 1850 and 1859 the first effort to research different regions history, geography, cartography, economy, society and cultures in the country was made by the Geographic Commission directed by Italian Agustín Codazzi. Graphic and documentary experience achieved by the Commission was greatly transcendent and complemented Botanic Expedition work. Commission sketchers were miniaturists, portraitists and landscapers who traveled all over the country and portrayed human types, labors, working forms, technical resources, garments, uses and geographic aspects. Commission documents are kept at the General Archive of the Nation.

=== Travelers and customs painters ===
During the first half of the nineteenth century, the first republican travelers and other visitors fascinated by nature, people and uses left large aquarelle drawing collections witnessing works, garments, uses and costumes, transportation ways, festivities and forms of life observed around them. Around the same time, other travelers and literates illustrated the same topics under written text such as «Los bogas del río Magdalena» (Magdalena River paddlers) by Rufino Cuervo y Barreto in 1840, and many diaries and travel books.

Best known travelers were Walhous Mark (1817–1895) whose excellent aquarelles constitute valuable testimony of Colombia at that time, Alfredo J. Gustin, César Sighinolfi, León Gautier, Luis Ramelli and many other. Some remained in the country and founded schools and academies of art to communicate their technical and artistic knowledge. Mexican Santiago Felipe Gutiérrez was the foreign artist of greater influence at the time. In 1881 he founded Gutiérrez Academy which became National University School of Beaux Arts.

=== Illustrated newspapers ===
Alberto Urdaneta invited Spaniard Antonio Rodríguez to come to the country to manage the engraving school, which functioned from 1881 in Bogotá. Illustrated Newspaper (1881–1886) illustrators formed in that school. The newspaper was a publication founded and directed by Urdaneta. Work of Illustrated Newspaper cooperators is of great documentary value.

Although Bogotá did not enjoy substantial foreign immigrants flow, according to census taken during the nineteenth century the population grew quite steadily: in 1832 the census recorded 36,465 inhabitants; in 1881, 84,723 inhabitants and by the end of the century nearly 100,000. Population growth from 1850 was partially due to Mid Century reforms, which expanded work sources. Bogotá offered work possibilities in the trade sector or different functions. Increase derived in physical city expansion towards the north creating new neighborhoods up to Chapinero village, five kilometers away from the city.

=== Cultural life in the city ===
Bogotá was a city quite isolated, since communication media were scarce. Only by the end of the century did such isolation decline thanks to the railroad and to some roads linking the city and the Magdalena River and down the river up to the Caribbean coast.

During the decade of the 70s, writers of varied trends grouped around Mosaico magazine, founded and directed by José María Vergara y Vergara, to make one of the first efforts to record Colombian literature history and to consolidate the cultural identity of the country.

Cultural life in the city concentrated in literary gatherings, which during the nineteenth century allowed Bogotanians to share their literary and political concerns and to attend musical and drama presentations. Maldonado Theater featured theatrical and opera presentations and by the end of the nineteenth century Bogotá had two important theatres: the Theater of Cristóbal Colón, inaugurated in 1892, and the Municipal Theatre, inaugurated in 1895, which featured zarzuela (operetta) and musical shows. Also the scenario for important Colombian history events during the decades of the 30s and 40s.

During the nineteenth century, despite constant riots and civil wars altering normal new republic development, Bogotá preserved traditions and uses dating back to colonial times, combined with some European influence. At meetings and gatherings certain foods and beverages became mandatory: chocolate served at night accompanied of homemade cookies and candy, and “ajiaco” became the typical dish. During night reunions someone played in the piano local composers music and in larger parties people danced pasillo a form of rapid waltz so called for the short dancing steps.

=== Artistic production ===
In 1886, the National School of Fine Arts was founded and definitely drove artistic development in the city. Alberto Urdaneta was the first director. Painters Epifanio Garay and Ricardo Acevedo Bernal, School professors, were important portraitists, but the most outstanding person at that time was painter Andrés de Santamaría (1860–1945), greatly renowned painting in Colombia. He was Beaux Arts School director twice and his work, associated to impressionism, is the most important of that time. Landscaping trend most famous representatives were Roberto Páramo, Jesús María Zamora, Eugenio Peña, Luis Núñez Borda and Ricardo Gómez Campuzano, painters whose work is preserved in the permanent National Museum collection.

=== Literary production ===
Bogotá gave the Spanish-speaking world José Asunción Silva (1865–1896), Modernism pioneer. His poetic work in the novel De sobremesa position him in an outstanding American literature place. Rafael Pombo (1833–1912) was outstanding American romanticism poet who left a collection of fables essential part of children imagination and Colombian tradition.

=== Railroad ===
The railroad to join Bogotá and the Carare and Magdalena Rivers dates back to radicalism times, but only started shaping when the first railroad section to Girardot was built, under government contract with Francisco Javier Cisneros in 1881, the first section of which joined the Magdalena port and Tocaima. In 1898 the rails reached Anapoima and in 1908 the rails linked the city and Facatativá. From that time Bogotanians were able to mobilize down to the Magdalena River using the railroad. Bogotá-Chapinero-Puente del Común section was inaugurated in 1894, Cajicá in 1896 and Zipaquirá in 1898. Including Soacha and Sibaté rails by the end of the nineteenth century, Sabana de Bogotá counted on one hundred railroad kilometers.

=== Telephone ===
The first telephone line in Bogotá linked from September 21, 1881, the National Palace and city mail and telegraph offices, and on August 14, 1884, the municipality of Bogotá granted Cuban citizen José Raimundo Martínez the privilege to install public telephone services in the city. In December the same year the first telephone was installed in the offices of Messrs. González Benito Hermanos connecting to another telephone in Chapinero.

=== Tramway ===
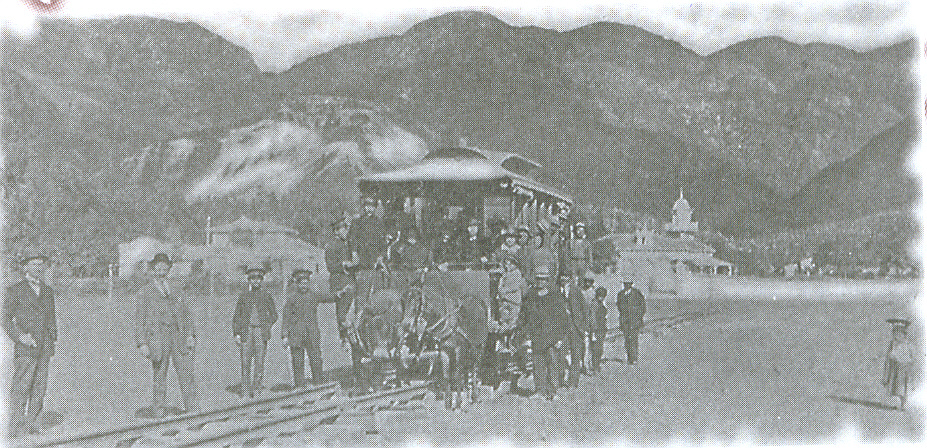
Tramway in Bogotá, 1884

On December 25, 1884, the first tramway pulled by mules was inaugurated, and covered the route from Plaza de Bolívar and Chapinero, and in 1892 the line linking Plaza de Bolívar and La Sabana Station started operating. At first, the tramway ran on wooden rails, but since it easily derailed, steel rails imported from England were installed. In 1894 a tramway car ran the Bogotá–Chapinero line every twenty minutes. The tramway provided services up to 1948, and was then replaced by buses.

=== Regeneration ===
President Rafael Núñez declared Federalism end, and in 1886 the country became a centralist Republic ruled by the Constitution in force – save some amendments – up to 1991. In the middle of political and administration avatars Bogotá continued as the capital and principal political center of the country.

== Twentieth century ==
Early in the new century, Colombia had to face devastating consequences from the One Thousand Days War, which lasted from 1899 to 1902, and the loss of Panama. Between 1904 and 1909 liberal party legality was reestablished and President Rafael Reyes endeavored to implement a national government. Peace and State reorganization generated economic activities increase. Bogotá started deep architectural and urban transformation with significant industrial and artisan production increase. In 1910 the Industrial Exposition of the Century took place at Park of Independence. Stands built evidenced industrial, artisan work, beaux arts electricity and machinery progress achieved. The period from 1910 to 1930 is designated conservative hegemony. Between 1924 and 1928 hard union struggle began with oil fields and banana zone workers strikes, leaving numerous people killed.

Bogotá had practically no industry. Production was basically artisan work grouped in specific places same as commercial sectors. Plaza de Bolívar and surroundings lodged hat stores, at Calle del Comercio –current Carrera Seventh– and Calle Florián –now Carrera Eight– luxurious stores selling imported products opened their doors; at Pasaje Hernández tailor's shops provided their services, and between 1870 and 1883 four main banks opened their doors: Bogotá, Colombia, Popular and Mortgage Credit banks.

Bavaria brewery, established in 1889, was one of the major industries. In 1923 the United States paid the Colombian government the first installment associated to agreed 25 million indemnification for their intervention in Panama separation, bringing bonanza reflected by exports increase, higher foreign investment and development infrastructure; roads were built, industry increased, public expense grew and urban economy expanded.

=== The liberal republic ===
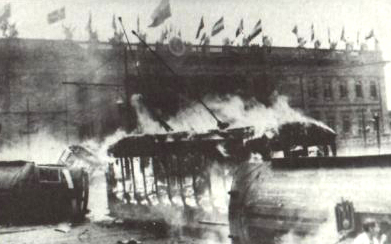
A tram is lit on fire in front of the National Capital in downtown Bogotá during the Bogotazo.

Following the Banana Masacre of 1928 and growing divisions within the Conservative Party, President Enrique Olaya Herrera took office in 1930. The Liberal Party reformed, during 16 years of the so-called Liberal Republic, agricultural, social, political, labor, educational, economic and administrative sectors. Unionism strengthened and education coverage expanded. In 1938, the fourth centenary of Bogotá's foundation which population had reached 333,312 inhabitants was celebrated.

The celebration produced a large number of infrastructure works, new construction and work sources. Following 1946 liberal party division, a conservative candidate took presidential office again in 1948. After the assassination of liberal leader Jorge Eliécer Gaitán in downtown Bogotá, the city was practically destroyed in the resulting civil unrest known as the Bogotazo.

=== City life in the 20th century ===
During those years Bogotá cultural life transformation accelerated, partially thanks to new communication media. Newspapers, domestic and foreign magazines, cinema, radio telegraph and telephone communications multiplied and aerial transportation linked Bogotá to the rest of the world. Waves of peasants and farmers fleeing violence and those coming to Bogotá in search for work and better opportunities tripled the population, which went from 700,000 in 1951 to 1,600,000 in 1964 and 2,500,000 inhabitants in 1973.

The city modernized, expanded work fields and industry, finances, construction economic offer and education. During General Rojas Pinilla (1953 to 1957) dictatorship, television arrived in Colombia and works such as El Dorado airport replacing ancient Techo airport were completed dynamizing along the Avenue joining the airport to the city, urban development and a large variety of western neighborhoods development. North Highway in turn expanded development to the north. Official Administrative Center project began and was subsequently completed to form the National Administrative Center.- CAN.

=== Bogotá, Special District and Capital District ===
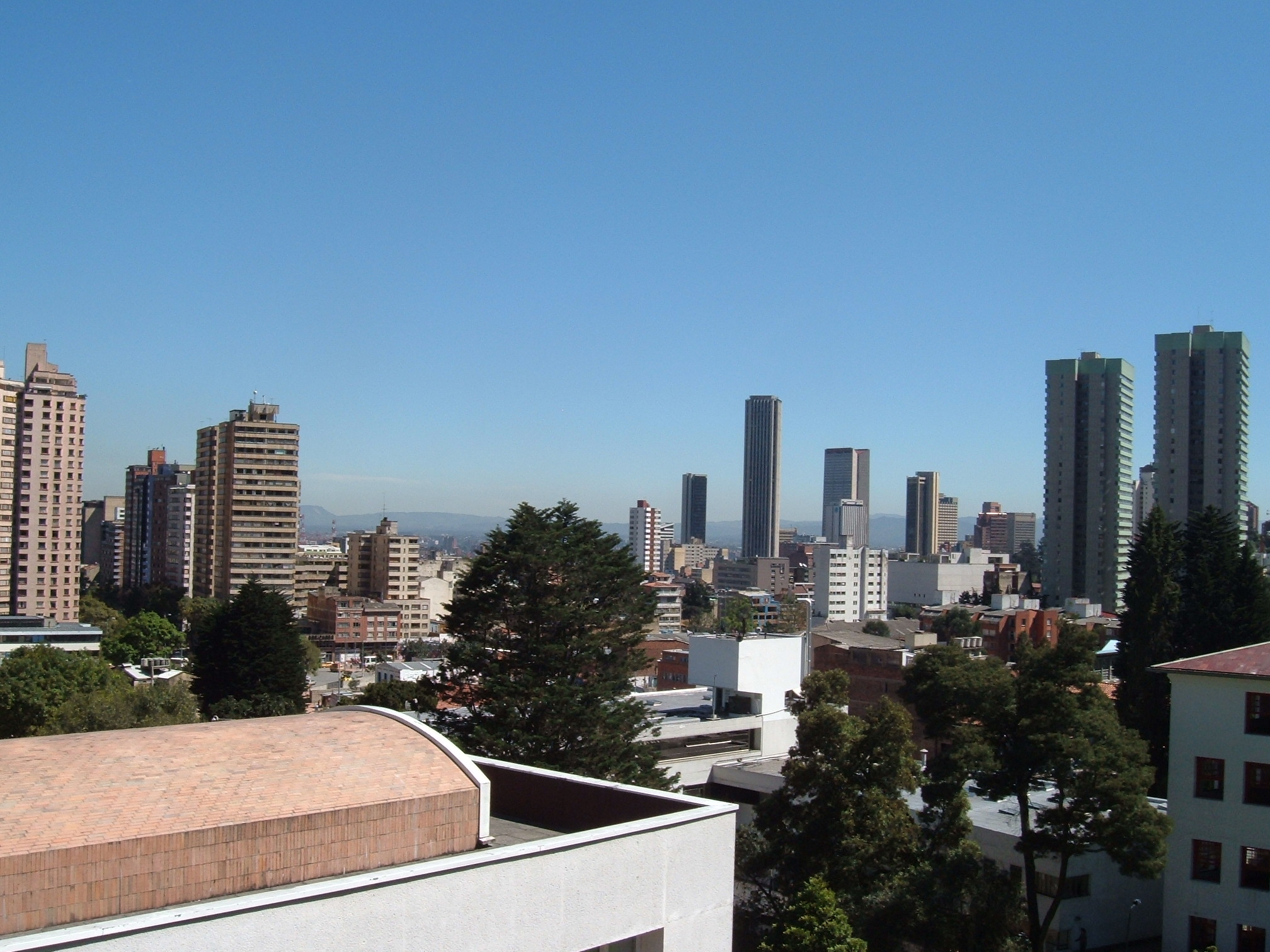
Bogotá

In 1954 municipalities of Usme, Bosa, Fontibón, Engativá, Suba and Usaquén were annexed by Bogotá and the Special District of Bogotá was created projected towards future growth, and the new city administration was organized. Under the Colombian Constitution of 1991, Bogotá became the Capital District (Distrito Capital, D.C.). According to the 1985 census, the population of the capital had increased to 4.1 million and by 1993, the population reached nearly 6 million.

=== Economic transformation ===
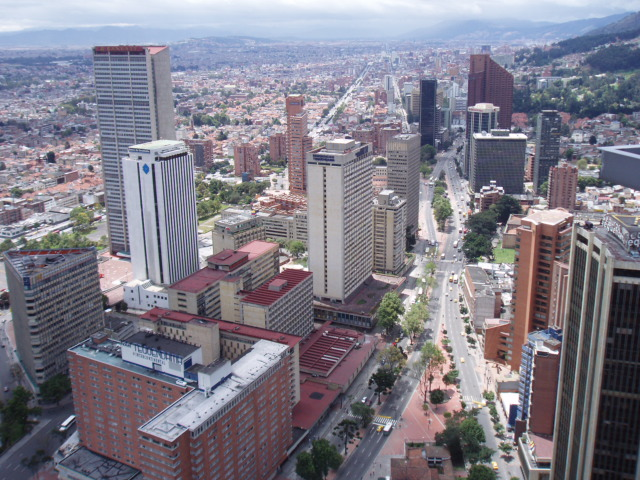
International center of Bogotá

City economy has greatly developed and diversified. Industrial production became substantial, requiring specialized industrial areas development. Artisan production became one of the most appreciated ornamental and utilitarian expression and a source of income to family business. Commercial activities increasingly grow and business, financial and banking centers position Bogotá as the economic axle of the country and a privileged Andean Zone, the United States and several European and Asian countries trade market place. The Bogotá savanna has become a flower production center exported to many countries, generating foreign currency and a work source absorbing a high number of labor. Informal economy and micro-enterprises cover a large sector of the population developing different activities.

=== Cultural life ===
From 1950 profound architectural, sculpture, painting, music, literature and education development began. Universities currently offer different artistic career studies and specialization. Faculties of Philosophy, Literature, History, Humanities and Social Sciences are forming professors, researchers, scientists, writers, musicians and filmmakers of international renown at pre-graduation, master and doctorate levels.

== Twenty-first century ==
The TransMilenio system of articulated buses opened its first phase in 2000 and has since grown to include 12 lines. As the city's population increased, the buses are often crowded, leading to the development of Bogotá Metro, construction on which began in 2021.

As of 2019, Bogotá reached a population of over seven million people.

== See also ==
- Timeline of Bogotá
