= Centro Andino =

Coordinates: 4.6668°N 74.0531°W

Andino Mall
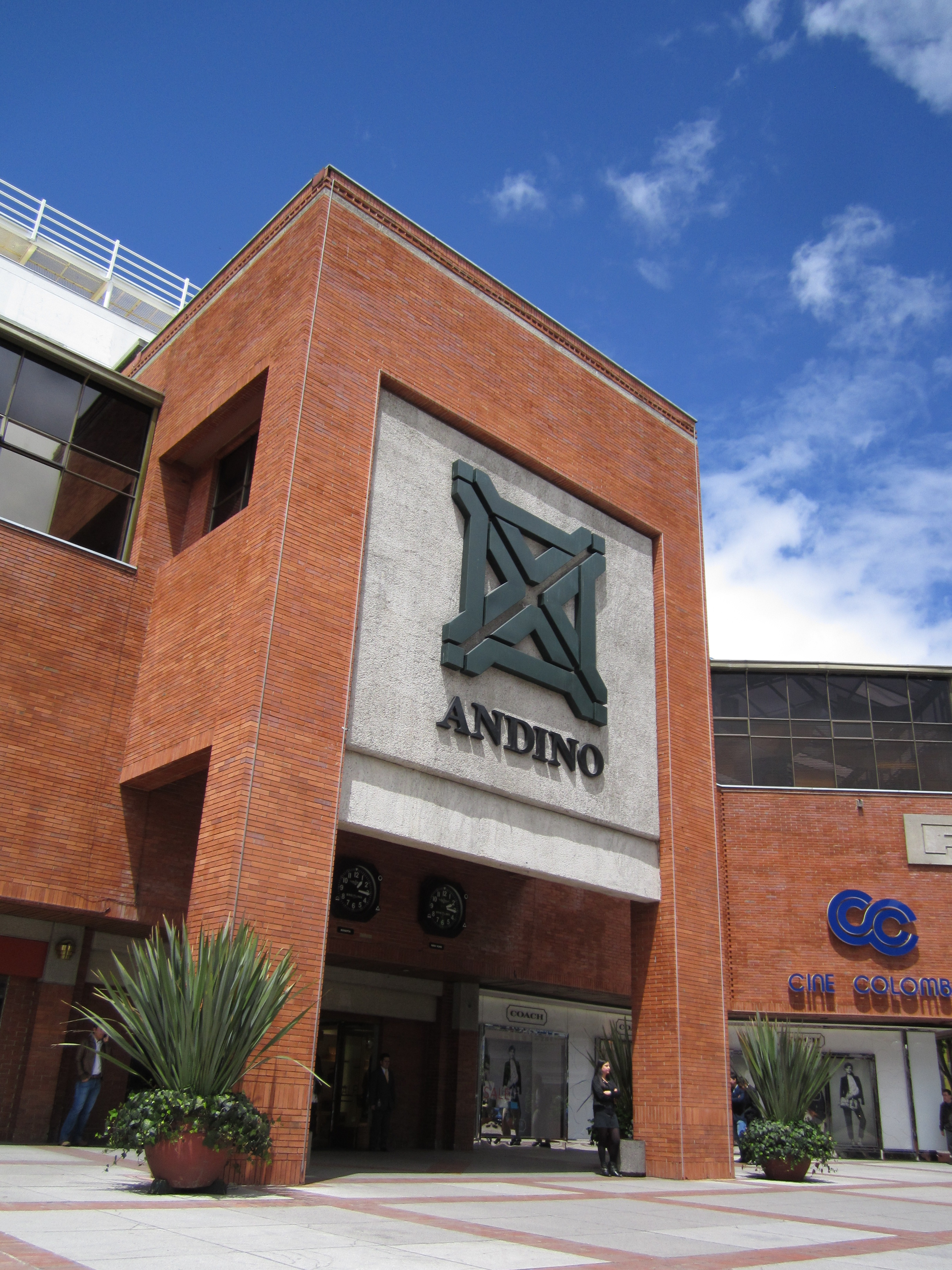
- Main gate
- Location: Bogotá, Colombia
- Address: Carrera 11 No. 82 - 71
- Opened: 1993
- Developer: Pedro Gomez & Cia
- Num. of stores: 205
- Floors: 4
- Parking: 719 + 104 (Valet Parking)
- Website: centroandino.com.co

The Centro Andino is a shopping mall located in the El Retiro neighborhood of Bogotá, Colombia. It is one of the largest shopping malls in Bogotá and Southern America. Centro Andino consists of both a business center and a shopping mall with a size of 19,486 m^{2} (209,750 sq ft) and 17,316 m^{2} (186,390 sq ft) respectively. It has 205 stores and is home to the only Louis Vuitton, Dolce & Gabbana, Longchamp and Tiffany & Co. stores in the country.

== History ==
The Andino Mall is built on the old school grounds of the "Colegio Andino - Deutsche Schule" (German high school), hence the name of the complex. The site was developed by the Pedro Gómez y Cia construction firm and supervised by architect Piedad Gómez.

The design took ten years, and construction began in 1992. It was completed in 1993, along with a business center annex.

Other projects have been developed in the surrounding area, including the El Retiro and Atlantis shopping malls. Together, the sites have transformed the area from a primarily residential and housing neighborhood to a commercial and urban space, including buildings up to 10 stories tall.

=== Renovations ===
In 2005, a food court, which included the largest structural dome in the country, was constructed. On March 3, 2012, there was an announcement that 22 stores distributed over four stories would be added.

=== Accidents ===
==== Fire ====
In February 2008, there was a fire on the third floor of the mall. The fire left three people injured: two suffered smoke inhalation and one sustained cuts on their hand. The most damage was caused by a roof collapse in the movie theater. It was later discovered that the fire was caused by a short circuit.

==== Bombing ====
On June 17, 2017, a bomb exploded in a second-floor bathroom of the mall, killing three women and injuring about nine others. One of the victims was a 23-year-old French woman who had spent six months volunteering in Colombia. The other two killed were Colombians. Eight people from a leftist urban guerilla group called the "People's Revolutionary Movement" were arrested.

== See also ==
- Centro Comercial Santafé
- Zona Rosa de Bogotá
