= Frisby (restaurant) =

Colombian fried chicken restaurant chain

Frisby S.A. BIC
- Trade name: Frisby
- Formerly: Pizzería Frisby
- Industry: Restaurants
- Genre: Fast food
- Founded: 12 June 1977; 49 years ago (as Pizzería Frisby); Pereira, Risaralda, Colombia
- Founder: Alfredo Hoyos Mazuera
- Headquarters: Dosquebradas, Risaralda, Colombia
- Number of locations: 270 (2025)
- Products: Fried chicken; Hamburger; Salad; Biscuits
- Website: frisby.com.co

Frisby is a Colombian fried chicken restaurant chain founded by Alfredo Hoyos Mazuera on 12 June 1977 in Pereira, Risaralda, Colombia. Originally opened as a pizzeria, its owners soon shifted focus on fried chicken.

It is credited with pioneering the fried chicken market in Colombia and popularizing the broaster style of cooking in the country. The owner has claimed that the company name, Frisby, came from the technique of spinning pizza dough in the air, which resembled a Frisbee disk. In 1978, the company began expanding across the Coffee Axis. It opened its first Bogotá location in 1987, with its first Medellín location opening in 1990. As of 2025, Frisby has more than 270 restaurants in 58 Colombian cities.

Today, Frisby is known for its fried chicken served with honey and is considered a symbol of Colombian gastronomy.

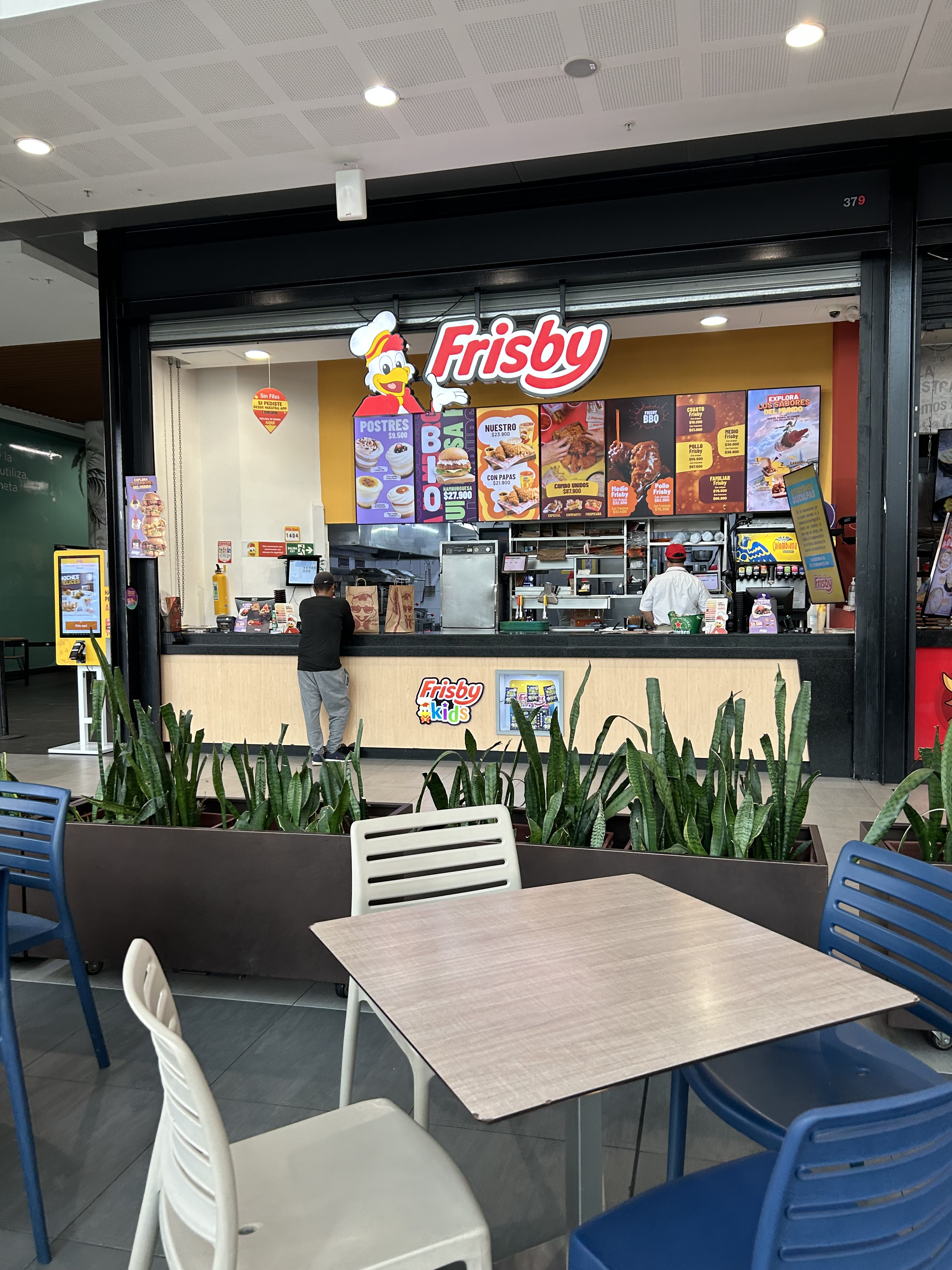
Frisby restaurant at Viva Envigado mall in Envigado, Antioquia.

== European Union controversy ==
A legal dispute arose in 2024 between Frisby S.A. BIC and Frisby España SL over the rights to the "Frisby" trademark in the European Union. Frisby S.A. BIC, which operates more than 270 restaurants in Colombia, registered its trademark with the EUIPO in 2005. In December 2024, the newly established Frisby España SL requested to have this registration nullified, citing that the Colombian company had not used the trademark within the EU during the five-year period required by European trademark law. The EUIPO ruled in Frisby España's favour and granted it exclusive use of the Frisby brand in the European Union.

Frisby España began posting on social media using the same logo, colours and mascot as the Colombian chain, announcing that they would soon be opening in Spain.

On 5 May 2025, Colombia-based Frisby S.A. BIC issued a public statement asserting that it had not authorized any expansion, marketing, or investment under the Frisby name in Spain or elsewhere in the European Union. The Spain-based Frisby España SL categorically rejected the statements by the Colombian company and accused it of undertaking strategic defamation and smear campaigns, warning that it reserves the right to initiate legal action for defamation, unfair competition and damage to its reputation.

Frisby S.A. announced in July 2025 that it had retained the law firm Garrigues to represent it in the ongoing legal battle against Frisby España over the use of the trademark in the EU.

As a result of the controversy, there has been an outpouring of support for Frisby S.A. BIC in Colombia, including from competitors.

== See also ==
- List of fast-food chicken restaurants
