= SACSA =

The South Australian Curriculum Standards and Accountability Framework, abbreviated to SACSA, was the curriculum framework used in all public schools in South Australia from Birth to Year 12 until 31 December 2012, when the National Australian Curriculum was introduced in South Australia.
