= Battle of Cartagena de Indias =

1741 naval battle of the War of Jenkins' Ear

- Part of the War of Jenkins' Ear and the War of the Austrian Succession
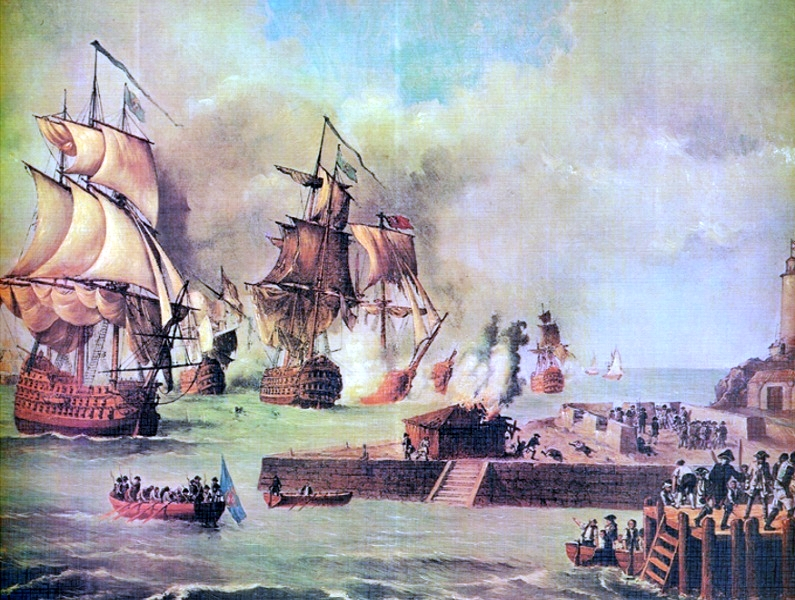
- British attack on Cartagena de Indias by Luis Fernández Gordillo. Oil on canvas, Naval Museum of Madrid
Date	13 March – 20 May 1741
Location	Cartagena de Indias, Viceroyalty of New Granada (current Colombia) 10°23′07″N 75°32′19″W
Result	Spanish victory
Territorial changes	Spain consolidates its control in South America

Belligerents
Great Britain; British America	Spain; (Spain) Viceroyalty of New Granada; (Spain) Province of Cartagena

Commanders and leaders
(Kingdom of Great Britain) Edward Vernon (Kingdom of Great Britain) Thomas Wentworth (Kingdom of Great Britain) John Grant † (Kingdom of Great Britain) Charles Knowles	(Spain) Sebastián de Eslava (Spain) Blas de Lezo (Spain) Jose Polanco Campuzano (Spain) Carlos Desnaux

Strength
27,400–30,000 military personnel: 12,000 regulars, marines, and militia; 15,398 Royal Navy sailors; 29 ships of the line 22 frigates 71 sloops-of-war 2 hospital ships 80 troop ships 50 merchant ships	3,000–4,000 military personnel: 2,700 regulars; 600 sailors and 300 militia; 600 Indian archers; 6 ships of the line and numerous shore-based guns

Casualties and losses
9,500–11,500 dead 7,500 wounded and sick 1,500 guns lost 6 Royal Navy ships lost 17 Royal Navy ships of the line heavily damaged 4 frigates and 27 transports lost	800 dead 1,200 wounded 6 ships lost 5 forts 3 batteries
- Location within Colombia

The Battle of Cartagena de Indias (Spanish: Sitio de Cartagena de Indias, lit. 'Siege of Cartagena de Indias') took place during the 1739 to 1748 War of Jenkins' Ear between Spain and Great Britain. The result of long-standing commercial tensions, the war was primarily fought in the Caribbean; the British tried to capture key Spanish ports in the region, including Porto Bello and Chagres in Panama, Havana, and Cartagena de Indias in present-day Colombia.

Two previous naval attacks in 1740 had failed and for the third attempt in March 1741, the British had opted for a combined naval and land campaign. The British were initially successful; destroying the chain barrier across the narrow channel of Boca Chica and capturing the Fort San Luis. However a night assault on Fort San Lazaro failed and the British were forced to retreat, having suffered over 9,500–11,500 fatalities, in great part to disease, and considerable material losses. Some units suffered death rates of 80 to 90 percent. The victory demonstrated Spain's ability to defend its position and largely ended military operations in this area. Both countries shifted their focus to the wider European War of the Austrian Succession and hostilities ended with the 1748 Treaty of Aix-la-Chapelle.

== Background ==
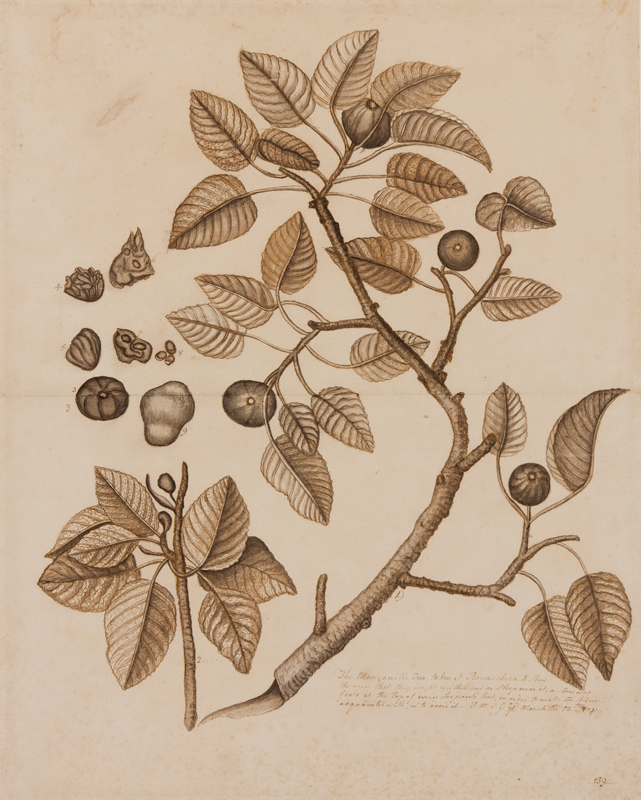
Botanical study, captioned "The Manzanilla Tree taken at Bocca chica to show / the men that they might neither cut not sleep near it, a bow was / pin'd at the top of every Sergeant's tent, in order to make the soldiers / acquainted with and to avoid it... F.M: J.G: (?) March the 12th 1741" – a reference to Vernon's invasion fleet, before the battle. Manzanilla (Hippomane mancinella) fruit are poisonous when eaten, and the sap causes blistering.

The 1713 Treaty of Utrecht, which ended the War of the Spanish Succession, gave British merchants access to Spanish colonies in the Americas, which had hitherto been closed off via mercantilist policies by Spain. This included the Asiento de Negros, a monopoly to supply 5,000 slaves a year to Spanish America, and the Navío de Permiso, permitting two ships a year to transport 500 tons of goods each for sale in Porto Bello or Veracruz. These concessions were assigned to the South Sea Company, which was taken over by the British government after becoming bankrupt in 1720. In the 18th century, European wars were often fought over trade privileges overseas, which the then dominant theory of mercantilism viewed as a finite resource. This meant if British trade increased, Spanish trade had to therefore diminish and so the role of a government was to restrict foreign competition.

As the French previously discovered, high costs meant the majority of the profits which could be gained from the concessions were in smuggling contraband goods, which evaded import duties and deprived the Spanish colonial authorities of much needed revenue. The Spanish Crown was also entitled to 25% of the profits made by the South Sea Company, which were rarely paid, despite their conviction it was immensely profitable. Between 1717 and 1733, only eight merchant ships were sent from Britain to the Americas and the asiento has been described as a "commercial illusion".

These tensions were increased by Spanish resentment at British control of Gibraltar and Menorca, which were confirmed by the Treaty of Utrecht. In the Anglo-Spanish War of 1727 to 1729, Spain laid siege to Gibraltar, while Britain blockaded Portobello; both attempts failed and the two countries made peace in the Treaty of Seville but the underlying issues for the conflict remained unresolved. British merchants wanted easier access to lucrative Spanish markets in the Caribbean Basin, where demand from colonists had created a large black market.

The Spanish were permitted to board British vessels trading with their colonies in the Americas; during a search for illegal goods in 1731, Welshman Robert Jenkins, captain of the Rebecca, claimed a Spanish coast guard officer had severed his ear. The legend this was later exhibited to the House of Commons has no basis in fact but proved useful in persuading the British public to support a war with Spain. Pressure from the British public for a declaration of war arose out of a combination of a political campaign to remove Robert Walpole, the long-serving Prime Minister, and a desire for greater commercial access in Spanish America. On 23 October 1739, Britain declared war on Spain.

=== Spanish Caribbean ===
The Spanish Caribbean trade had a network of four main ports: Vera Cruz; Cartagena; Porto Bello; and the main port through which all the trade of those three ports came, Havana. On 22 November 1739 the British captured Porto Bello in the Viceroyalty of New Granada. The British attack was part of an attempt to damage the Spanish economy. The poorly defended port was attacked by six British ships of the line under the command of Vice-Admiral Edward Vernon. The relative ease of this capture, although the city was abandoned immediately after the battle, caused jubilation in Britain.

Vernon was given command over one quarter of the Royal Navy, which formed part of a major combined arms amphibious expedition under the overall command of Lord Cathcart. The first goal of the expedition was to capture Havana, the most important of the Spanish ports because it had facilities where ships could be refitted and, by 1740, it had become Spain's largest and most active shipyard. Lord Cathcart died en route and it remained unclear who was in command overall. Cathcart's death resulted in dissension in the British command, preventing the coordination needed for this complex operation.

The despatch of the large fleet and troop contingent had been demanded by the British public led by merchant lobbyists, and the South Sea Company in particular, which refused to accept the compromise agreements made by the Spanish and British governments. The Duke of Newcastle advocated the public's demands before Parliament. Vice-admiral Vernon was an active and ardent supporter of war against Spain and advocated offensive actions both in Parliament and before the British Admiralty. The decision to mount a large expedition to the West Indies was reached in December 1739. Walpole, who opposed the war categorically, and Vernon, who favoured small squadron actions, were both dissatisfied with the situation. Vernon, despite his earlier failed raid on Cartagena, was not convinced that a large-scale attack on a heavily fortified city would prove to be as successful as his smaller Portobello assault had been. He feared in particular that a prolonged siege would lead to heavy attrition from disease, a typical situation given the medical knowledge of the time.

=== Objectives ===
Britain's objective was to capture and retain Spain's four ports in the Caribbean basin. By taking control of these ports, the British would effectively control the entry and exit routes to South America. The British would have bases from which to launch attacks into the interior, and Spain would have limited access to deep water ports on the eastern coast of their American colonies and therefore be unable to resupply their inland forces. Control of these ports would also provide the British a foothold to later attack the rest of the Spanish Empire in the Americas. However, Britain had no place to build and refit ships in the Caribbean, as Spain did with the dockyards at Havana, and without a dockyard no fleet could remain in the area for any length of time without breaking down. A quick capture of Havana and its dry dock was imperative and it was the favored objective of Newcastle and Sir Charles Wager, First Lord of the Admiralty, but Britain's divided ministry left the course of the campaign up to Vernon and others at a council of war held in Jamaica. They followed Vernon, who preferred Cartagena as their initial objective as it was a good port and to windward of Britain's existing Caribbean bases and Vernon thought Havana was too well defended to be the initial target.

=== City of Cartagena de Indias ===
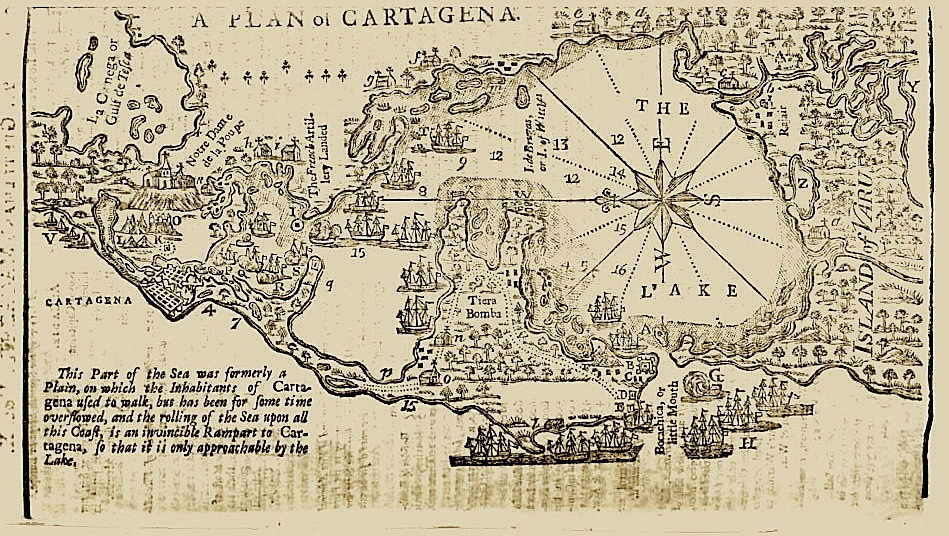
Map of Cartagena de Indias from Gentleman's Magazine 1740

Founded by Pedro de Heredia in 1533, Cartagena of the Indies in the 18th century was a large and rich city of over 10,000 people. It was the capital of the province of Cartagena and had significant fortifications that had been recently repaired, enlarged and improved with outlying forts, batteries and works. Its harbour, considered by some observers to be one of the finest in the world, served the galleons of the commercial fleet (Galeones a Tierra Firme y Perú) that annually assembled at Havana to convoy the immense revenues of gold and silver from New Granada and Peru to Spain.

The shallow coastal shelf extending out from the city walls prevented a direct attack from the sea, while a high water table hindered sapping and exposed unacclimatised troops to disease. After Cartagena's capture in 1585 by an English force under Sir Francis Drake, its fortifications were rebuilt by the Italian engineer Battista Antonelli. Neglect allowed the French privateer Baron de Pointis to sack the town in 1697 but Juan de Herrera y Sotomayor largely rebuilt Cartagena's defences before his death in 1732.

The city faces the Caribbean to the west; to the south its bay has two entrances: Boca Chica (Little Mouth) and Boca Grande (Big Mouth). Boca Chica historically was the deep water entrance and was so narrow it allowed the passage of only one ship at a time. This entrance was defended on one side by the Fort San Luis with a couple of small outworks on the peninsula of Tierra Bomba, and on the other side by the fascine battery Baradera. Beyond Boca Chica was the lagoon of the outer harbour with an entry channel into the inner harbour between two peninsulas, each defended by a fort. The walls of the city itself mounted some 160 cannon, while the suburbs had 140 guns. The city was surrounded by a moat and its gates were guarded by recently built bastions. The suburbs were also surrounded by a moat. On a hill about a quarter mile south of the city stood Fort San Lazaro, a square fifty feet on a side with three demi-bastions. The fort's position commanded the city itself and the plain around the hill. Another small hill nearby defended the fort, but there was no fresh water source available outside Cartagena and the fort. The road from the best landing point, the beach at Texar de Gracias, ran three miles to Fort Lazaro.

== Battle ==
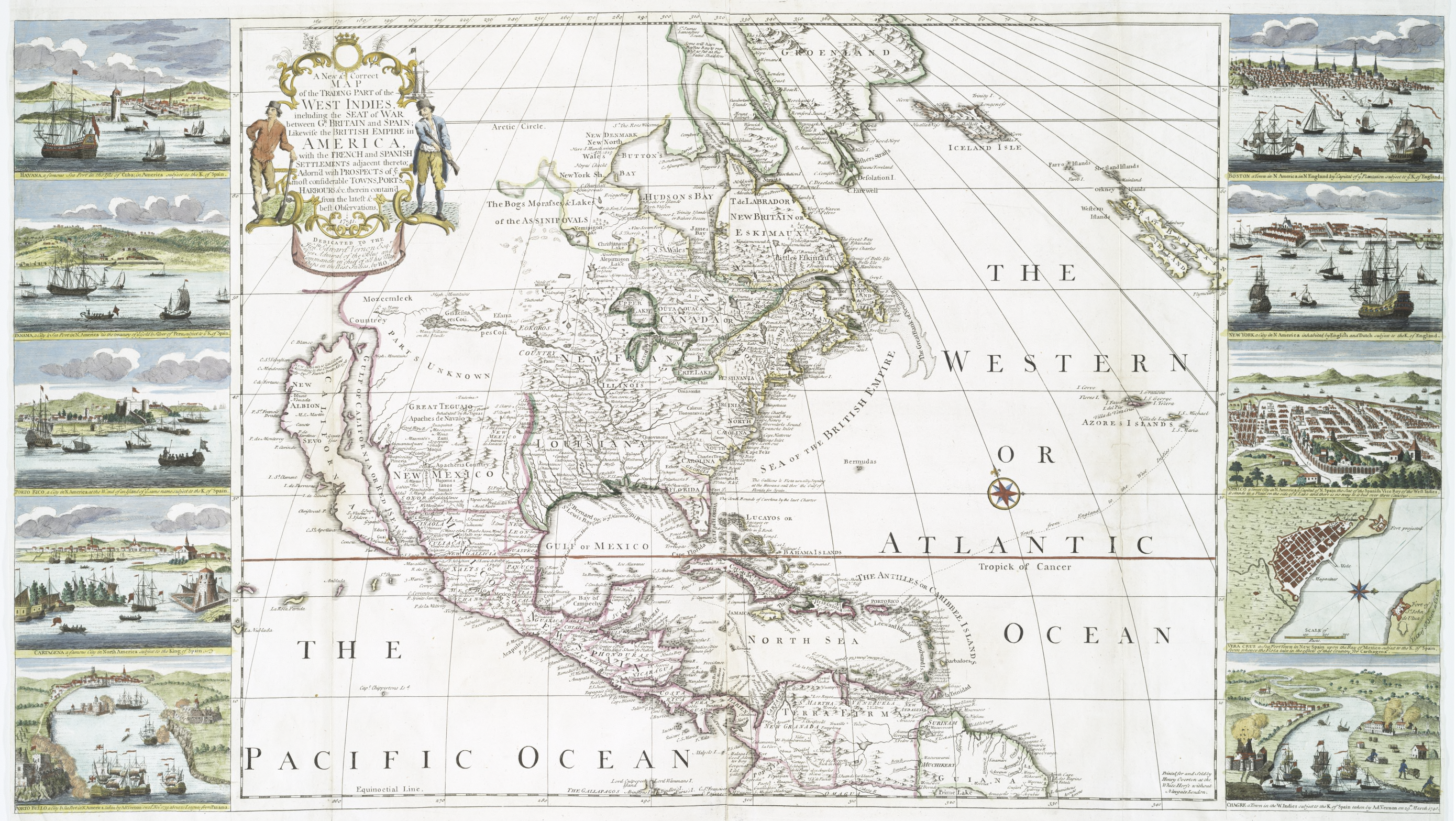
A map of the trading part of the West Indies created 1741 in honour of Admiral Vernon shows Boca Chica, Cartagena – 2nd from the bottom left

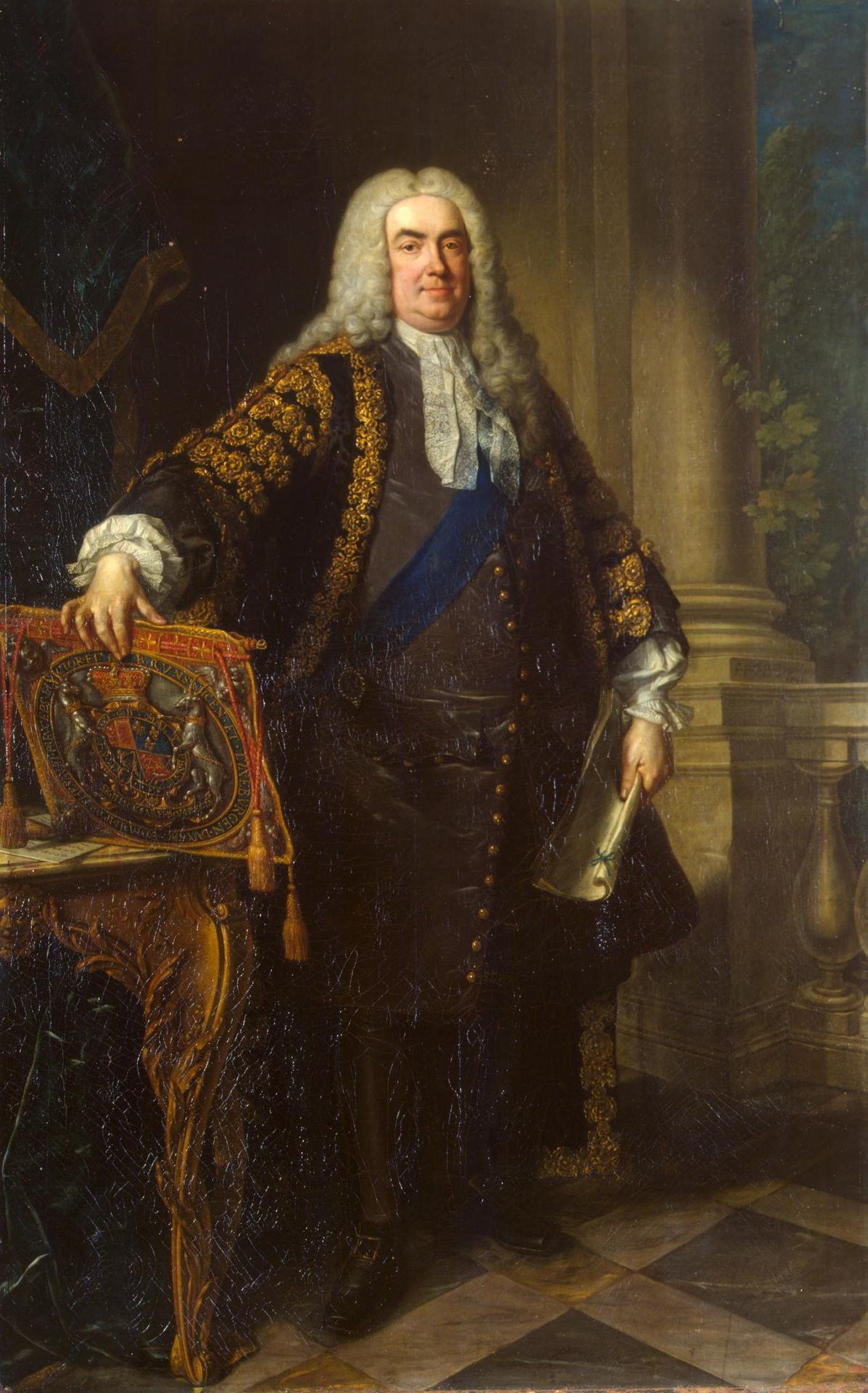
Sir Robert Walpole, Prime Minister of Great Britain, from the studio of Jean-Baptiste van Loo, 1740

The battle pitted a British invasion force of 124 ships including: 29 ships of the line, 22 frigates, and various fire ships and bomb ships armed with a total of some 2,000 cannon, in addition to 80 troop transports, 50 merchant ships, and two hospital ships. There were at least 27,400 military personnel, of which the land force totaled 12,000 including: two British regular infantry regiments, the 15th Foot and 24th Foot, 6,000 newly raised marines and some 3,600 American colonial troops, commanded by Colonel William Gooch (the Lieutenant Governor of Virginia), in four battalions designated as Gooch's American Regiment, arriving from the North American colonies on another 40 transports.

The Spanish force defending Cartagena was composed of 2,700 to 3,000 Spanish regulars from the regiments Aragon, España and that of Toledo, Lisboa and Navarra just arrived in October 1740, brought by Vice-admiral Torres; a colonial regiment from Cartagena; an unspecified number of sailors; five companies of militia and 600 Indian archers, perhaps 4,000 to 6,000 defenders, manning six ships of the line and strategic fortifications—under the command of the Governor General of Cartagena, Don Blas de Lezo and the Viceroy of New Granada, Sebastián de Eslava.

=== Preliminary manoeuvres ===
The expedition was very slow leaving Britain. Initially, contrary winds delayed the sailing until most of the shipboard provisions were consumed and a steep increase of sickness occurred among the ships' crews. Then, news of the sailing of the French squadrons and a Spanish squadron caused further delay while the British fleet was reinforced in response. The expedition suffered from manpower shortages in the navy, which required drafting two full infantry regiments, the 34th and 36th; to fill crew requirements Cathcart was ordered by the government to transfer 600 of his marines to provide marines for the men of war. These delays cost the British three months of valuable campaign time. The 3,600 Americans were transported to Jamaica from New York on 40 transports escorted by some British men of war and arrived much sooner on 3 December 1740. The Americans were originally under the command of General Spotswood, Governor of Virginia, who was to be second-in command under Cathcart – but Spotswood died and was replaced by Gooch as commander of the Americans. They found on their arrival that no arrangements had been made by the British government for their provisions. The lack of provisions and the climate immediately began to take a toll on the Americans, while the fleet from Britain was suffering from typhus, scurvy and dysentery; by January 1741 the land forces had already suffered 500 dead, including Lord Cathcart the commander in chief, and 1,500 sick. With both Cathcart and Spotswood dead, command of the land forces went to Thomas Wentworth, who had no previous combat command experience. In Jamaica, 300 enslaved Africans were added to the expedition as a work battalion. Additional delays before and after embarking from Jamaica cost more precious time, including a brief skirmish with a French squadron. Both the British and the Spanish were well aware that with the onset of the two-month rainy season in May, the so-called "sickly season", which would last from May to November, would also begin.

The Spanish had received reinforcements but were already suffering severely from diseases as well. Similar to the British, but not as disruptive to operations, there was dissension between Lezo and Eslava. In particular, Lezo favoured a very strong, all-out defense of Boca Chica channel; Eslava's opposition led to an under-manning of some of the forward defenses, allowing the British an easier initial landing.

=== Attack on Fort San Luis at Boca Chica ===
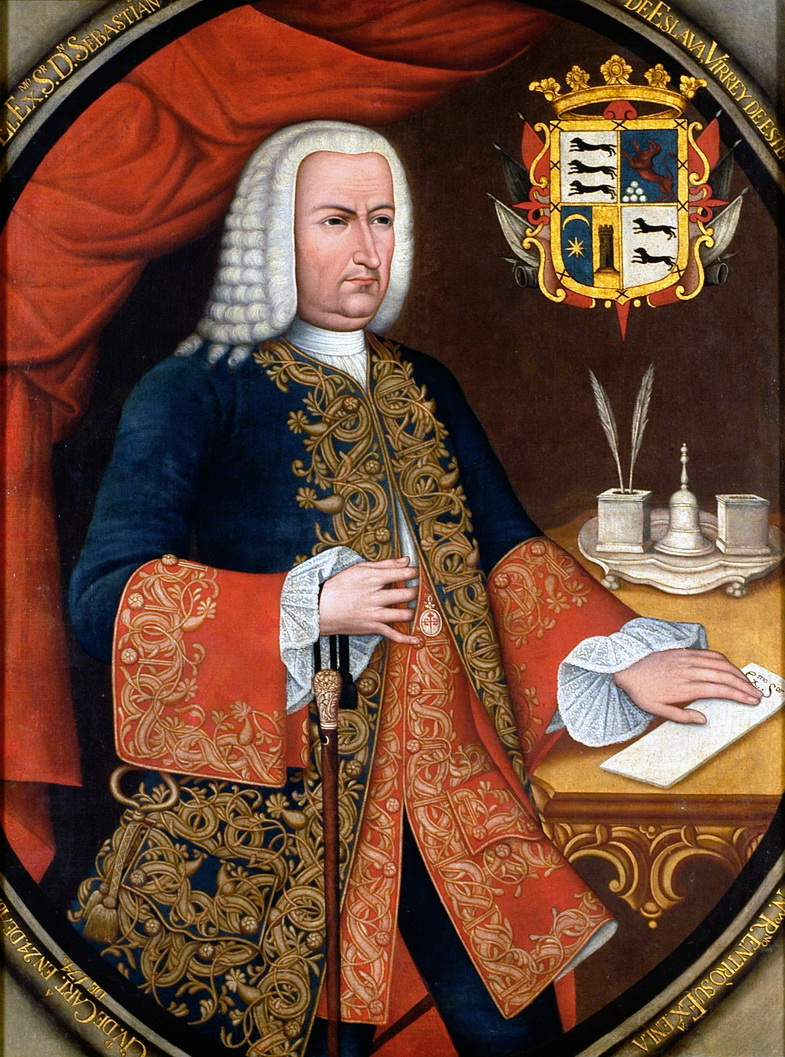
Sebastián de Eslava, Viceroy of New Granada from an 18th-century painting

The British expedition arrived off Cartagena on 13 March with no overall commander but with decisions being made by councils of war, with General Wentworth commanding the land forces and Vernon the sea forces. The navy had lost so many sailors by this time as a result of the epidemics that one third of the land forces were needed to fill out the crews. Although the city of Cartagena was fronted on one side by the ocean, the shore and surf were so rough as to preclude any attempt to approach it from sea. The other access channel, Boca Grande, was too shallow to allow the passage of ocean-going ships. The channel of Boca Chica was the only deep-draft passage into the harbour of Cartagena. It ran between two narrow peninsulas and was defended on one side by the fort of San Luis, Boca Chica Castle, with four bastions having some 49 cannon, three mortars and a garrison of 300 soldiers under the command of the chief engineer, Carlos Desnaux. A boom stretched from the island of La Bomba to the southern peninsula on which was Fort San Jose with 13 cannon and 150 soldiers. Also supporting the entrance were the six Spanish line ships.

Before settling to disembark, Vernon silenced the batteries of the fortresses of Chamba, San Felipe and Santiago defended by Lorenzo Alderete from Malaga. After attacking the fort of Punta Abanicos in the Barú Peninsula, defended by Jose Polanco Campuzano from Santo Domingo and a week of bombardment, the British planned to land near the smaller access channel, Boca Chica, with 300 grenadiers. The Spanish defenders of two small, nearby forts, San Iago and San Philip, were driven off by a division of three ships of the fleet under Chaloner Ogle which suffered some 120 casualties with the Shrewsbury alone losing 100 killed and wounded as well as taking serious damage from cannon fire from Fort San Luis. The grenadiers landed that evening and were followed on 22 March by the whole of the British land forces: the two regular regiments and the six regiments of marines. Of the American land forces, only 300 were allowed ashore as most of the American troops of the four battalions had been dispersed to serve aboard the ships of the line to replace Vernon's losses in sailors and were not available for amphibious operations. They were followed in a few days by the artillery. After the army made camp, the Americans and the Jamaicans constructed a battery in two weeks and its twenty 24 pounder guns began battering the fort. A squadron of five ships, consisting of the Boyne, Prince Frederick, Hampton Court, Tilbury, and Suffolk, led inshore by Commodore Richard Lestock, also attempted to batter the fort into submission for two days but had the worst of it, making no impression on the fort and having many men killed and three ships heavily damaged and disabled.

The British artillery on land, after three days of firing night and day, made a breach in the main fort while part of the fleet assisted. Another part of the fleet engaged the Spanish ships, two of which Lezo scuttled and another, the Galicia, he set on fire. The two scuttled Spanish ships partially blocked the channel and the Galicia was captured by the British before it could sink. The British attacked Fort San Luis by land and sea on 5 April. The infantry advanced on the breach; however, the Spanish had already retreated to fortifications in the inner harbour. Over the following week, the landing force re-embarked and entered the harbour. The operation against Boca Chica cost the British army 120 killed and wounded, additionally 250 died from the diseases of yellow fever and malaria, and 600 sick were hospitalized.

=== Attack on Fort San Lazaro ===
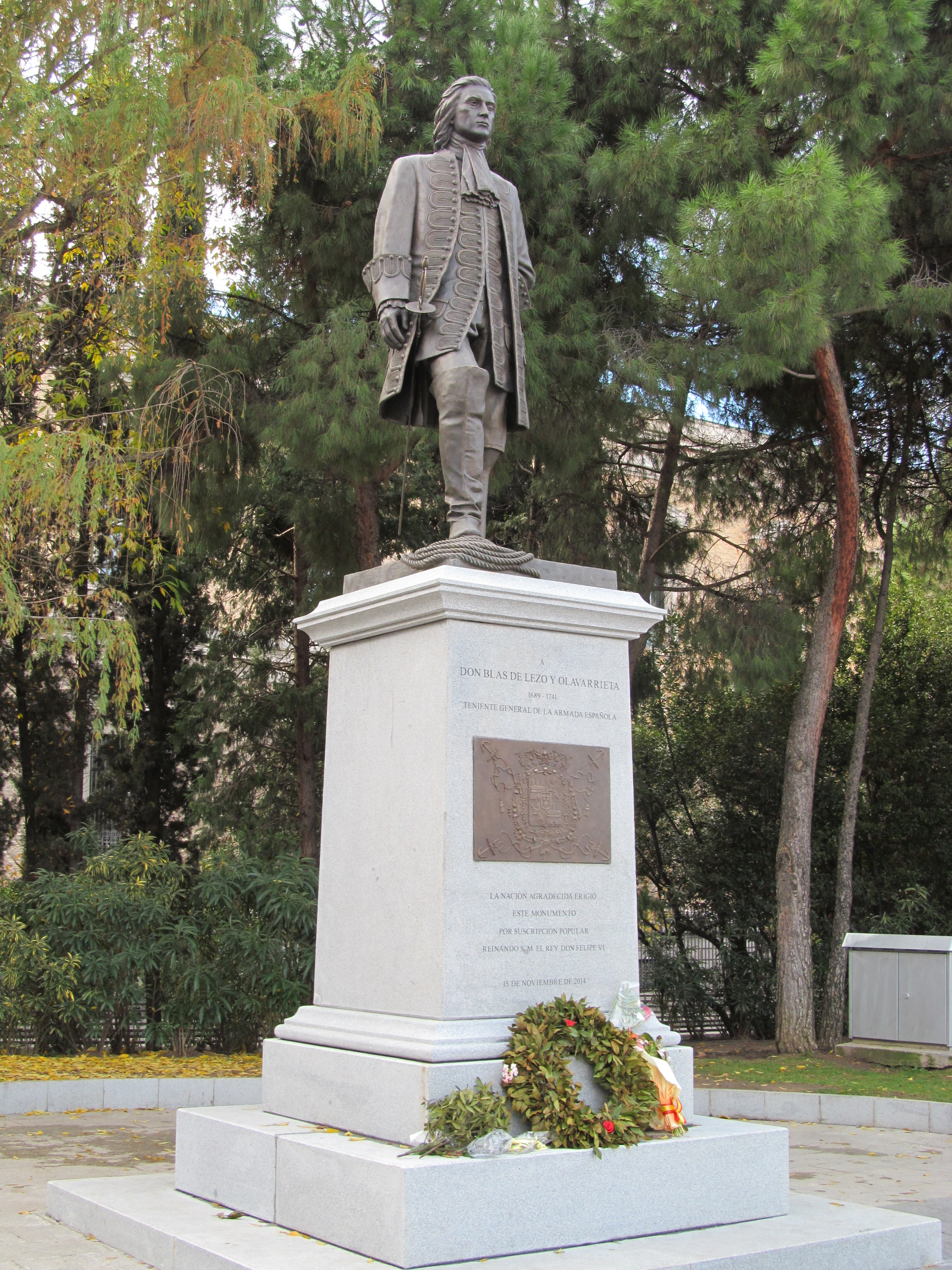
Monument in Plaza de Colón (Madrid) built to commemorate Spanish Admiral Blas de Lezo

The next council of war decided to attempt to isolate Cartagena from the land side by an assault of Fort San Lazaro, called in some accounts San Felipe de Barajas. With the capture of San Luis and other outlying defensive works, the fleet passed through the Boca Chica channel into the lagoon that made up the harbor of Cartagena. The Spanish withdrew to concentrate their forces at Fort San Lazaro and the city. Vernon goaded Wentworth into an ill-considered, badly planned assault on the fort, an outlying strong-point of Cartagena, which Vernon refused to support with the fleet making specious excuses about the depth of the harbor. The ships cleared the beach with cannon fire and Wentworth landed on 16 April at Texar de Gracias.

After the British gained the inner harbour and captured some outlying forts, de Lezo strengthened the last main bastion of Fort San Lazaro by digging a trench around it and clearing a field of fire on the approach. He had to hold the fort as it commanded the city and, in British hands, a bombardment would force Cartagena to surrender in a short time. Lezo defended the trench with some 650 soldiers and garrisoned the fort with another 300, while keeping a reserve of 200 marines and sailors. The British advanced from the beach and had to pass a narrow defile. There they met a Spanish force that briefly contested that passage before giving way.

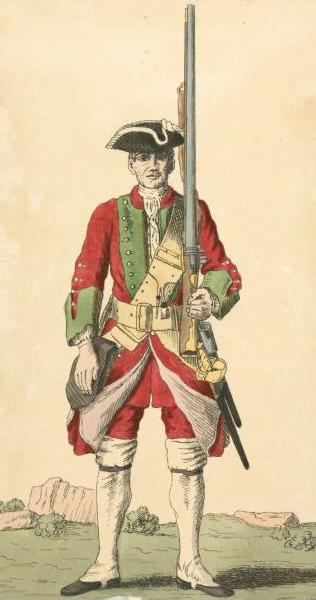
Gooch's marines, 43rd regiment of foot from the Cloathing Book of 1740

The only British engineer with the expedition had been killed at Fort San Luis; no one could construct a battery to breach the walls. The British decided to storm the fort outright in a coup de main, walls unbreached, during a night attack. The night attack would allow the assault of the northern side of the fort facing Cartagena because, in the dark, the guns of Cartagena would not be able to give supporting fire. The southern side had the lowest and most vulnerable walls and the grenadiers would attempt to quickly storm and carry the parapets. But the attack started late and the initial advance on Lazaro was made near dawn, at 4:00 am 20 April, by a forlorn hope of 50 picked men followed by 450 grenadiers commanded by Colonel Wynyard. The main body was 1,000 men of the 15th and 24th regiments commanded by Colonel Grant, then a mixed company from the 34th and 36th regiments and some unarmed Americans carrying scaling-ladders for the fort's high walls and wool packs to fill in the trench. Finally, there was a reserve of 500 marines under Colonel Wolfe.

The column was led by two Spanish deserters as guides who misled the British on the southern low walled side. Wynyard was led to a steep approach and, as the grenadiers scrambled up the slope, they were received with a deadly volley of musket fire at thirty yards/metres from the Spanish in the entrenchments. The grenadiers deployed into line and advanced, slowly trading fire. On the north face, Grant fell early and the leaderless troops exchanged fire with the Spanish. Most of the Americans dropped the ladders they carried and took cover. Those ladders brought forward were too short by 10 feet (3 m). After an hour, the sun rose, and as the guns of Cartagena opened fire on the British, casualties mounted. At 8:00 am, when a column of Spanish infantry coming from the gates of Cartagena threatened to cut the British off from their ships, Wentworth ordered a retreat. The assault failed, with a loss of 600 casualties from a force of approximately 2,000. Sickness and disease increased the casualties of the expedition. During the period surrounding the attack on Fort San Lazaro, Wentworth's land forces were reduced from 6,500 effectives to 3,200.

=== British withdrawal ===
Don Blas de Lezo's plan had been that, given the overwhelming force against him, he would attempt to conduct a fighting withdrawal and delay the British long enough until the start of the rainy season at the end of April. The tropical downpours would delay campaigning for another two months. Further, the longer the enemy had to remain mostly crowded on ships at sea and in the open on land, the more likely that insufficient supply, discomfort and especially disease would become his allies and the deadly enemies of the British. De Lezo was aided by the contempt that Vernon and Wentworth had for each other, which prevented their cooperation after the initial landing.

Another important factor in the defeat of the British force was that Cartagena's defensive fortifications had been repaired and improved over the past year. Although De Lezo was pressed to the limit, his plan worked and the Spanish prevailed. The rains came and the British had to board their ships, where close quarters made disease even more deadly. By 25 April, Vernon and the council decided to retreat to Jamaica, and by mid-May they were gone. By 7 May, only 1,700 men of the land forces were fit for service and no more than 1,000 in condition to land against the enemy; within a month of leaving Cartagena, another 1,100 died. British strength was reduced to 1,400 and American to 1,300.

The expedition and battle lasted for 67 days and ended with the British fleet withdrawing in defeat, with 18,000 dead or incapacitated, mostly by disease. The Spanish also suffered severely from disease including Blas de Lezo himself, who died a few weeks after falling ill from the plague from unburied bodies. In addition a total of 50 British ships were lost, badly damaged, disabled or abandoned for lack of crews. There were nineteen ships of the line damaged, four frigates and twenty-seven transports lost. Of the 3,600 American colonists, who had volunteered, lured by promises of land and mountains of gold, most died of yellow fever, dysentery, and outright starvation. Only 300 returned home, including Lawrence Washington, who renamed his Virginia plantation, Mount Vernon after Admiral Vernon.

During the early stage of the battle, when the Spanish forces had retreated from different defense points to regroup in the larger fortress of San Lazaro, feeling victory in his hands Vernon dispatched a messenger, Captain Laws, to Britain to inform King George of the British forces' entry to the inner bay on 17 May. The souvenir industry, in expectation of a triumph that never came, had been busily manufacturing commemorative medals for the occasion. They were mainly made by button-makers, who copied a few basic designs and are generally of very poor quality. The largest collections of these medals can be found in the United Kingdom and the United States. Commemorative china was also produced but its survival has been rarer. In one of the medals Admiral Vernon was shown looking down upon the "defeated" Spanish admiral Don Blas de Lezo who appeared kneeling down. A contemporary song was composed by a sailor from the Shrewsbury that prematurely celebrated the victory:

Vernon's Glory; or, The Spaniards Defeat.

Being an account of the taking of Carthagena by Vice-admiral Vernon...
"...and the town surrender[ed]

To Admiral Vernon, the scourge of Spain".

The main reasons for the British defeat were the failure of the British to find united leadership after the commander in chief, General Charles Cathcart, died of dysentery en route; the logistic inability to land siege artillery and ammunition near to Cartagena; the impediments made by Vernon that prevented involvement of his line ships to support the infantry forces; and the effective Spanish maneuvers carried out by the viceroy Sebastián de Eslava, Admiral Blas de Lezo and Colonel Carlos Suivillars.

There is no evidence for the claim made in recent years by works published in Spain that Admiral Vernon sent a letter to Blas de Lezo saying that "We have decided to retreat, but we will return to Cartagena after we take reinforcements in Jamaica", to which Blas de Lezo supposedly responded: "In order to come to Cartagena, the English King must build a better and larger fleet, because yours now is only suitable to transport coal from Ireland to London". Coal was not transported from Ireland to England, the reverse being the case.

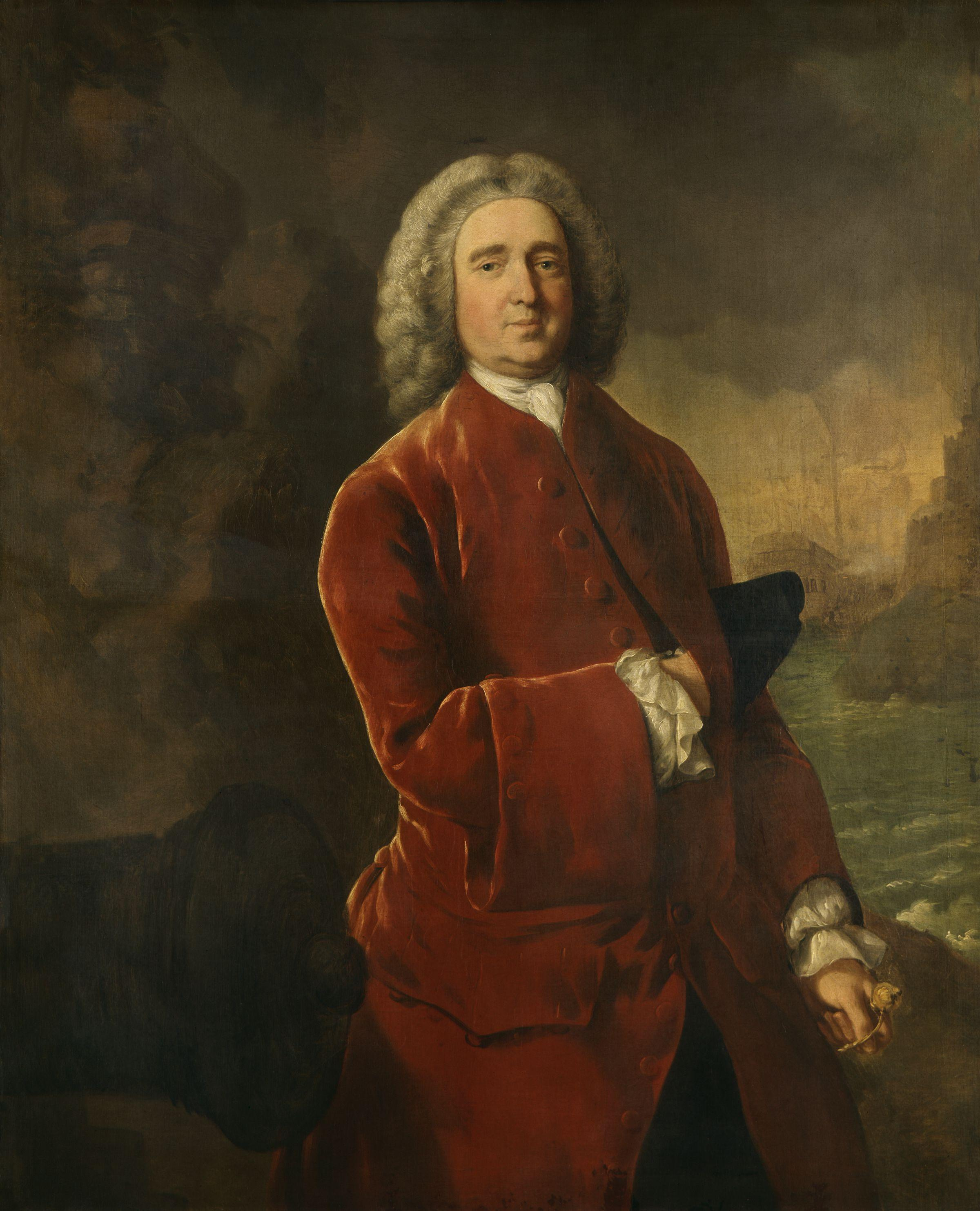
British admiral, Edward "Old Grog" Vernon

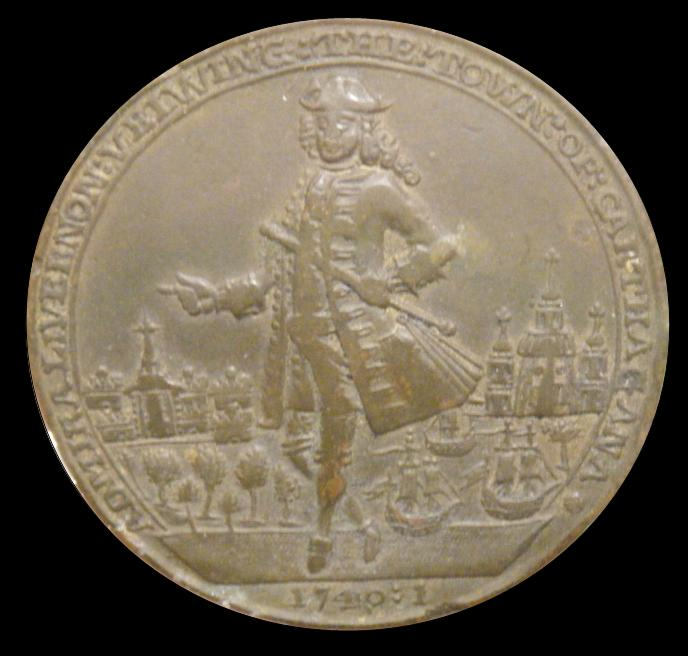
English medal commemorating the British destruction of the forts at Cartagena. Vernon is depicted pointing at the city. The medal says "Admiral Vernon veiwing the town of Carthagana" [sic]. The obverse has the inscription "The forts of Carthagena destroyd by Adm Vernon". Naval Museum of Madrid.

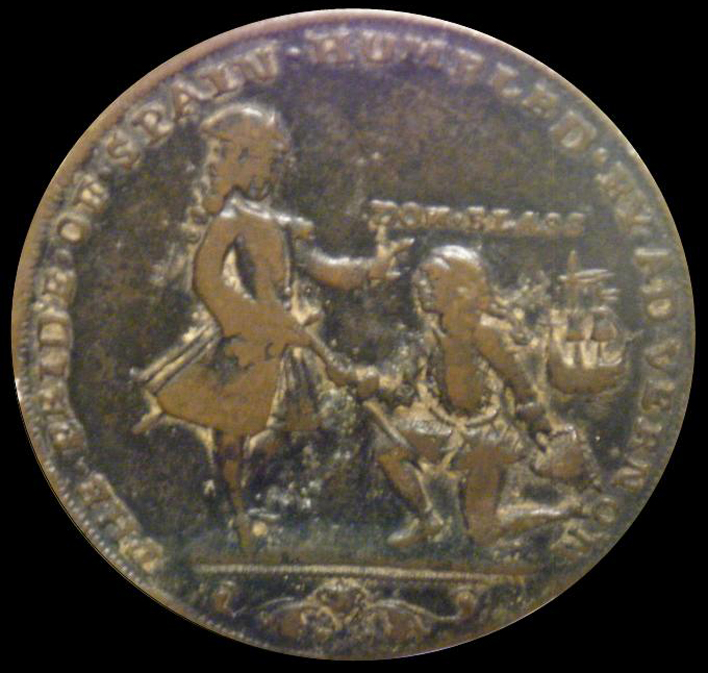
Commemorative British medal of the supposed "victory". It shows Vernon looking down upon the Spanish admiral Blas de Lezo (Don 'Blass'). The medal says "The pride of Spain humbled by ad. Vernon". Naval Museum of Madrid.

== Aftermath ==
Following the news of the disaster Robert Walpole's government soon collapsed. Spain retained control over its most strategically important colonies, including the vitally crucial port in the Caribbean that helped secure the defense of the Spanish Main and its trans-Atlantic trade with Spain.

News of Britain's defeat reached Europe at the end of June 1741 and had immense repercussions. It caused George II of Great Britain, who had been acting as mediator between Frederick the Great of Prussia and Maria Theresa supporting Austria over Prussian seizure of Silesia in December 1740, to withdraw Britain's guarantees of armed support for the Pragmatic Sanction. That encouraged France and Spain, the Bourbon allies, revealed to also be allied with Prussia, to move militarily against a now isolated Austria. A greater and wider war, the War of the Austrian Succession, now began.

The staggering losses suffered by the British compromised all the subsequent actions by Vernon and Wentworth in the Caribbean and most ended in acrimonious failure despite reinforcements of 1,000 troops from Jamaica and 3,000 regular infantry from Britain. Vernon and Wentworth were both recalled to Britain in September 1742, with Chaloner Ogle taking command of a very sickly fleet that had less than half its sailors fit for duty. By the time the Caribbean campaign ended in May 1742 ninety percent of the army had died from combat and sickness. Several other British attacks took place in the Caribbean with little consequence on the geopolitical situation in the Atlantic. The weakened British forces led by Charles Knowles made raids upon the Venezuelan coast, attacking La Guaira in February 1743 and Puerto Cabello in April, though neither operation was particularly successful.

The failure to take Cartagena caused what was left of the naval forces assigned to Vernon to remain in the Caribbean longer. This resulted in the weakened Mediterranean squadron being unable to prevent the Spanish from twice convoying troops totalling 25,000 to Italy in November and December 1741. It was not until Commodore Richard Lestock, commander of one of Vernon's divisions at Cartagena, returned to Europe with ships from the Caribbean fleet, that Britain reinforced its presence in the Mediterranean.

Historian Reed Browning describes the British Cartagena expedition as "stupidly disastrous" and quotes Horace Walpole, whose father was Vernon's bitter enemy, writing in 1744: "We have already lost seven millions of money and thirty thousand men in the Spanish war and all the fruit of all this blood and treasure is the glory of having Admiral Vernon's head on alehouse signs." The inscription on Vernon's marble memorial in Westminster Abbey reflects the bitter dispute between the naval and land forces at the siege of Cartagena: "He subdued Chagre, and at Carthagena conquered as far as naval forces could carry victory".

In 2014, whilst on his royal visit to Colombia, then Prince Charles in cooperation with the city authorities unveiled a plaque which commemorated the British casualties of the battle. After complaints from city residents that the Spanish defenders were not mentioned on the plaque and that it was placed near a statue of de Lezo, the city authorities decided to remove the plaque, that by the time had been already vandalised. Mayor Dionisio Velez stated that it had not been his intention to "stir this controversy, or hurt the feelings of people".

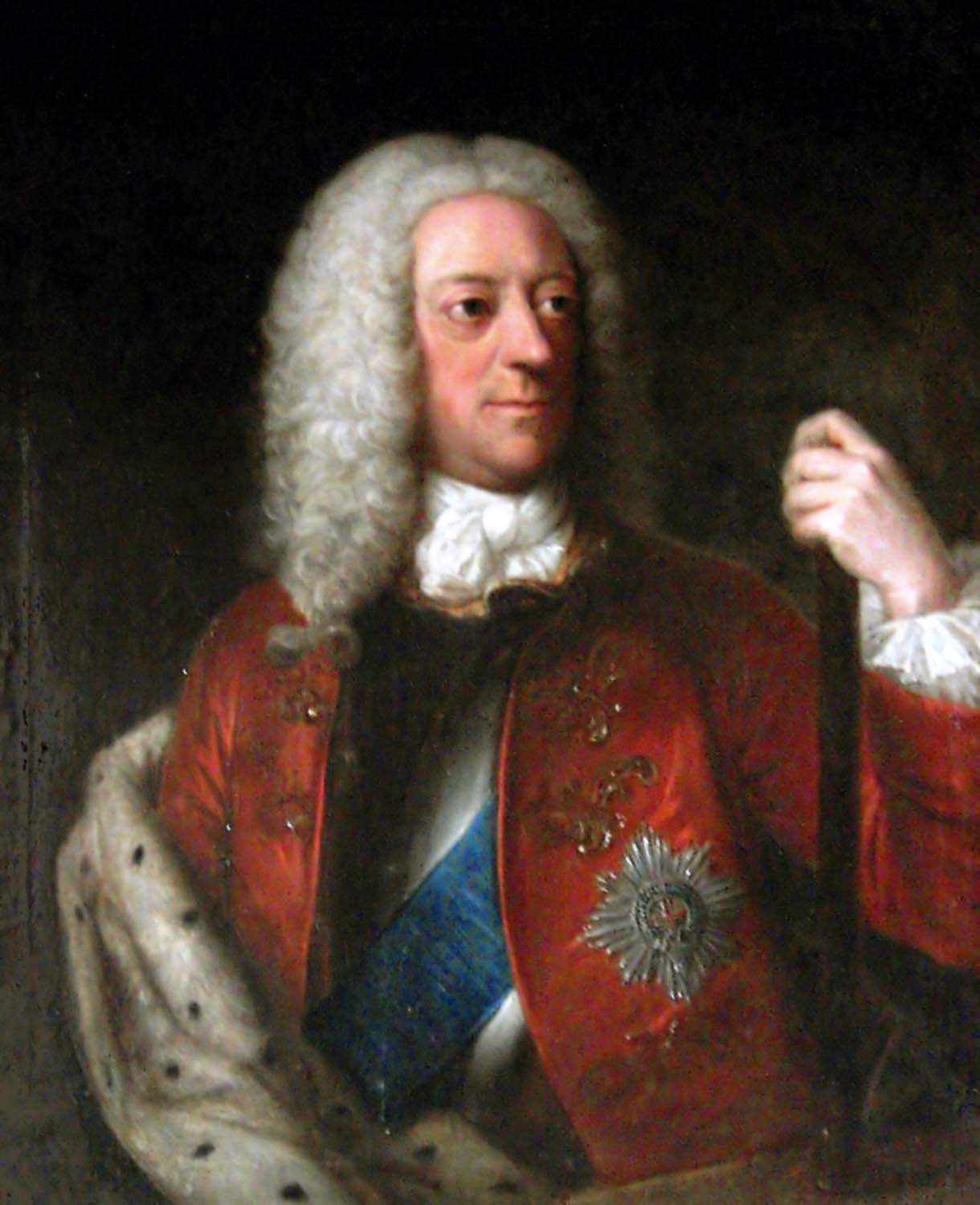
George II of Great Britain, 18th-century painting

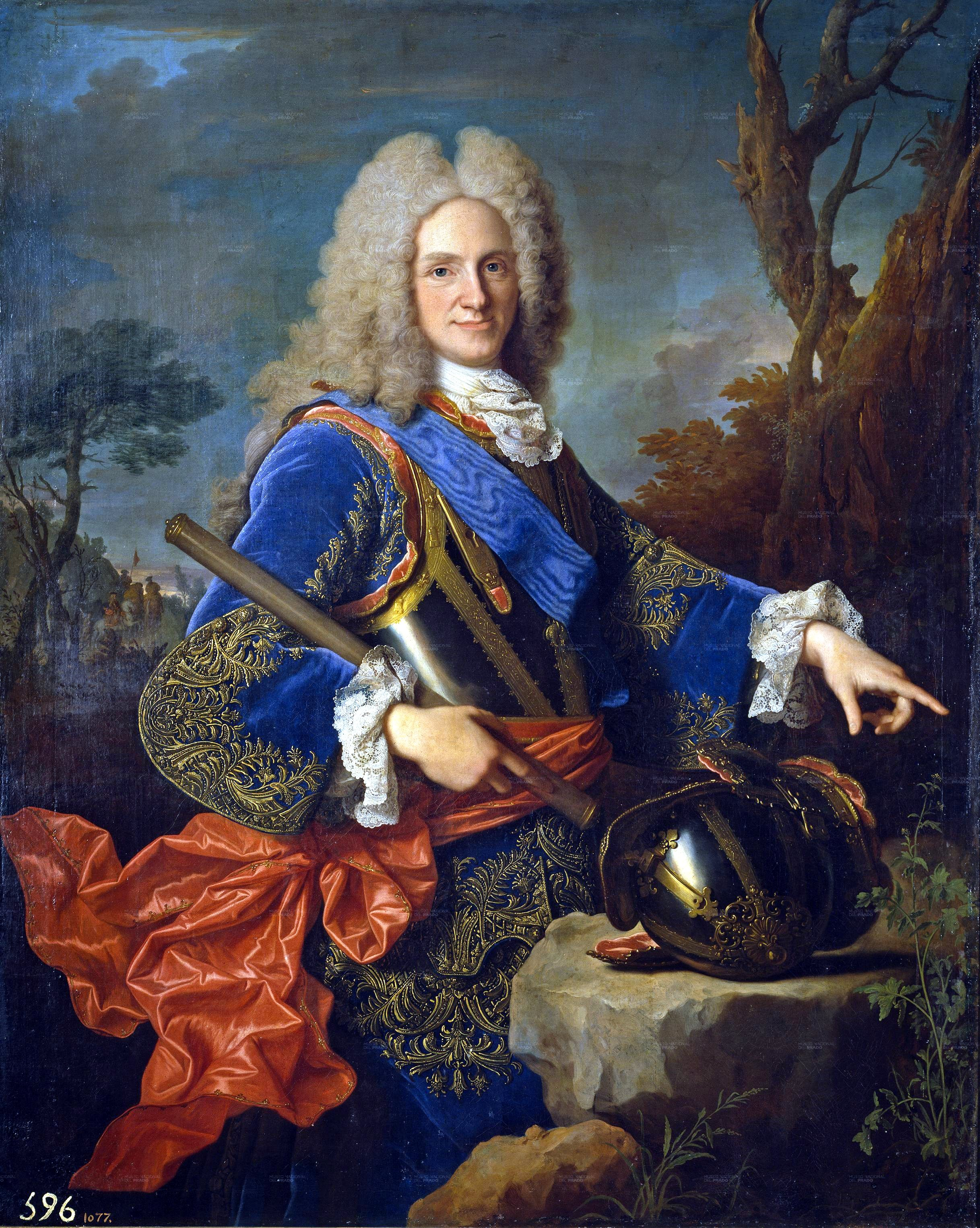
Philip V of Spain, 18th-century painting

== Popular culture ==
Scottish folk/pirate metal band Alestorm has a song entitled "1741 (The Battle of Cartagena)" on their 2014 album Sunset on the Golden Age, which chronicles the battle.

== Bibliography ==
- Anon (2008). "Don Blas de Lezo y Olavarrieta un Ejemplo Del Espíritu Militar Español" (PDF). Soldados Digital (in Spanish). Archived from the original (PDF) on 16 July 2011.
- Beatson, Robert (1804). Naval and Military Memoirs of Great Britain, from 1727 to 1783. (in six volumes). London: Longman, Hurst, Rees and Orme.
- Browning, Reed (1993). The War of the Austrian Succession. New York City: St. Martin's Press. ISBN 978-0312094836.
- Conway, Stephen (2006). War, state, and society in mid-eighteenth-century Britain and Ireland. Oxford Univ. Press. ISBN 978-0199253753.
- Coxe, William (1815). Memoirs of the kings of Spain of the House of Bourbon, from the Accession of Philip V to the Death of Charles III. Vol. 3. London: Longman, Hurst, Rees, Orme and Brown.
- Dull, Jonathan R. (2009). The Age of the Ship of the Line: The British and French Navies, 1650–1815. University of Nebraska Press. ISBN 978-0803219304.
- Eslava, Sebastián de. Diario de todo lo ocurrido en la expugnacion de los fuertes de Bocachica, y sitio de la ciudad de Cartagena de las Indias Madrid, 1741.
- Fernández Duro, Cesáreo (1902). Armada española desde la unión de los reinos de Castilla y de León (in Spanish). Vol. VI. Madrid: Est. tipográfico Sucesores de Rivadeneyra.
- Ford, Douglas (1907). Admiral Vernon and the Navy: A Memoir and Vindication. London: T. Fisher Unwin.
- Fortescue, John William (1899). A History of the British Army. Vol. II 1713–1763. London: MacMillan.
- Harbron, John D. (2004). Trafalgar and the Spanish navy. Naval Institute Press. ISBN 978-0870216954.
- Hart, Francis Russel (1922). Admirals of the Caribbean. Boston: Houghton Mifflin.
- Baugh, Daniel A. (2002). "The Eighteenth-Century Navy as a National Institution 1690–1815". In Hill, J.R.; Ranft, Bryan (eds.). The Oxford illustrated history of the Royal Navy. Oxford Univ. Press. ISBN 0198605277.
- Hume, David (1825). The History of England. London.
- Le Fevre, Peter; Harding, Richard, eds. (2000). Precursors of Nelson: British admirals of the eighteenth century. Stackpole Books. ISBN 978-0811729017.
- Letter from Governor Montiano, 6 July 1740, Collections of the Georgia Historical Society. (Vol. VII. – Part I) Published by Georgia Historical Society, Savannah, Ga.
- The London Gazette, Published by Authority, Number 8015, May 1741.
- Lowrie, Ernest B (2016). Lord Chief Justice Mansfield: Dark Horse of the American Revolution. Archway Publishing. ISBN 978-1480828537.
- Marks, Christian Mathew (1999). British Force Projection in the West Indies, 1739–1800 (PhD). Ohio State University.
- Marshall, Peter James; Low, Alaine (2001). The Oxford history of the British Empire: The eighteenth century. Oxford Univ. Press. ISBN 978-0199246779.
- Offen, Lee G. (2009). Gooch's Regiment 1740–1742, America's First Marines. Veterans Publishing Systems. ISBN 978-0977788415.
- Pares, Richard (1963). War and Trade in the West Indies 1739–1763. Frank Cass & Co. ISBN 0714619434.
- Pearce, Edward. The Great Man: Sir Robert Walpole, London, 2007, ISBN 978-1844134052.
- Pritchard, James (1995). Anatomy of a Naval Disaster: The 1746 French Expedition to North America. McGill-Queen's University Press. ISBN 978-0773513259.
- Quintero Saravia, Gonzalo M. (2002) Don Blas de Lezo: defensor de Cartagena de Indias Editorial Planeta Colombiana, Bogotá, Colombia, ISBN 9584203266, in Spanish.
- Régniez, Philippe (2012). Blas de Lezo (in French). Editions de La Reconquête.
- Richmond, Herbert William (1920). The navy in the war of 1739–48. The Cambridge Naval and Military Series. Vol. 1. Cambridge University Press. ISBN 978-1107611641.
- Rivas Ibañez, Ignacio (2008). Mobilizing Resources for war: the intelligence systems during the War of Jenkins' Ear (PhD thesis). University College London.
- Rodger, Nicholas Andrew Martin (2005). The Command of the Ocean: A Naval History of Britain, 1649–1815. W.W. Norton. ISBN 978-0393060508.
- Samuel, Arthur Michael (1923). The Mancroft Essays. Jonathan Cape.
- Smollett, Tobias; Roscoe, Thomas (1844). The miscellaneous works of Tobias Smollett. London: Henry G. Bohn. Contains Smollett's long version of "Expedition to Carthagena", pp. 603–611
- Smollett, Tobias George; Hume, David (1848). History of England. Vol. II. London.
- Smollett, Tobias. Authentic papers related to the expedition against Carthagena, by Jorge Orlando Melo in Reportaje de la historia de Colombia, Bogotá: Planeta, 1989.
- Urban, Sylvanus, Gent., editor. The Gentleman's Magazine, and Historical Chronicle, London, Vol. XI, 1741.
