= Castillo San Felipe de Barajas =

Fortress in Cartagena, Colombia

- Cartagena, Colombia
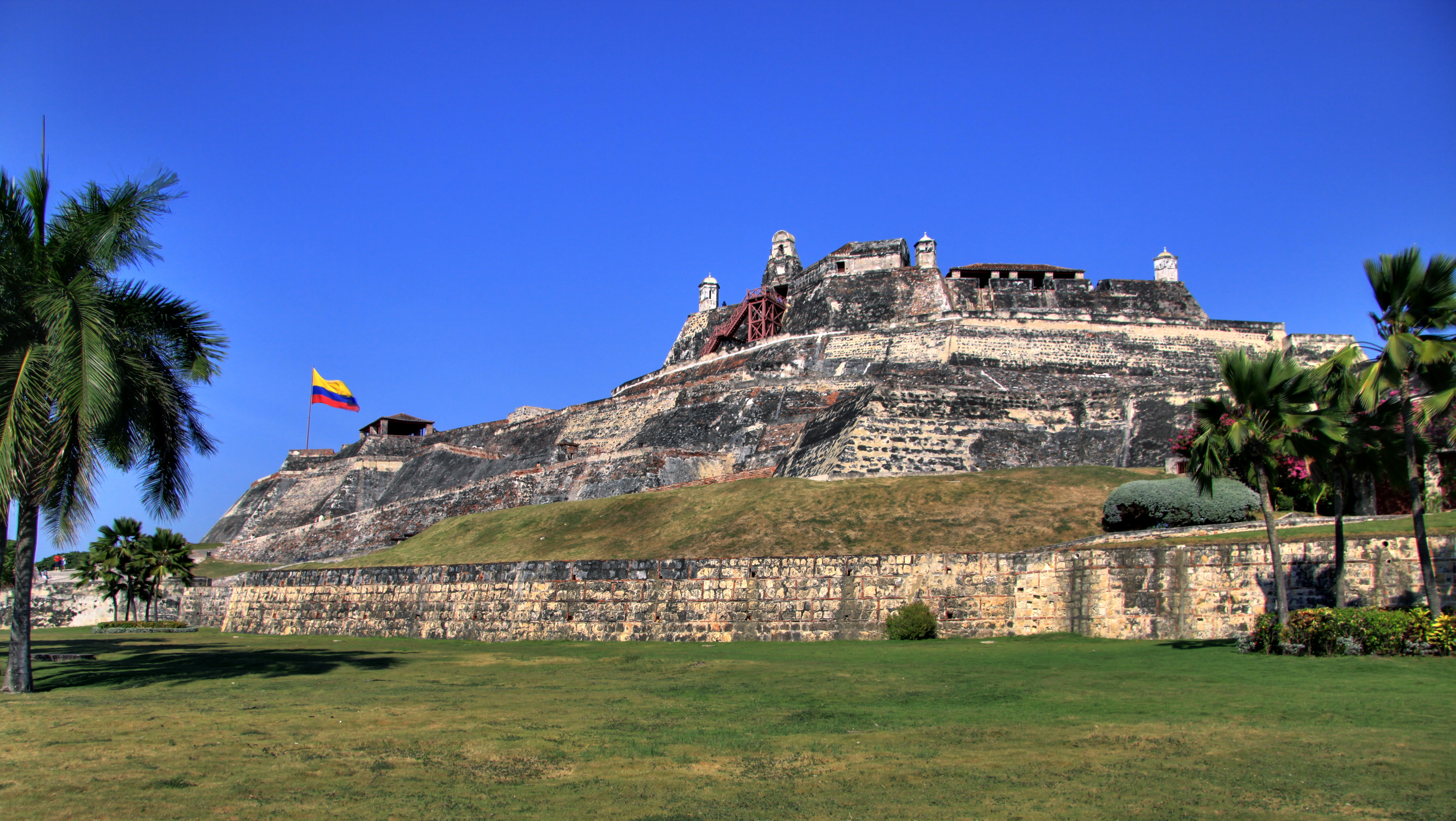
- Castillo San Felipe de Barajas

Site information
- Type: Bastion, Fortress
- Owner: Colombia
- Controlled by: Colombia
- Open to the public: Yes

Location
- Location of the Castillo San Felipe de Barajas within Colombia
- Location within Colombia
- Coordinates: 10.4225°N 75.5392°W

Site history
- Built: 1639–1767
- Built by: Antonio de Arévalo
- In use: 1639–present
- Materials: Stone
- Battles/wars: Raid on Cartagena (1697); Battle of Cartagena de Indias (1741)

Garrison information
- Past commanders: José de Herrera y Sotomayor (1739–41)

The Castillo San Felipe de Barajas (San Felipe de Barajas Castle) is a fortress in the city of Cartagena, Colombia. Constructed in 1639, it is located on Cerro San Lázaro in a location that overlooks approaches to the city by land or sea. It was originally known as the Castillo de San Lázaro. It was built by African slave labor under Spanish supervision during the colonial era. The fortress was involved in several battles between the late 17th to early 19th centuries between European powers.

== History ==
Construction on the fortress was finalised by 1536 and expanded between 1639 and 1657. It was built in a triangular shape on top of a hill, with eight batteries and a garrison of 200 soldiers and four gunners. Its name was given in honour of Philip IV of Spain.

In the 1697 raid on Cartagena, during the War of the Grand Alliance, the castle fell to the French privateer Baron de Pointis. The castle was repaired by José de Herrera y Sotomayor in 1739, British Admiral Edward Vernon attacked the fortress in the 1741, Battle of Cartagena de Indias, an important conflict of the War of Jenkins' Ear. Vernon's forces were repelled by the Spanish admiral Blas de Lezo. Another expansion was made to the fortress in 1763 by Antonio de Arévalo.

During the Spanish American wars of independence, by 1815 a large Spanish expeditionary force under Pablo Morillo had arrived in New Granada. Cartagena fell in December, and by May 1816, the royalists had control of all of New Granada.

== The castle ==
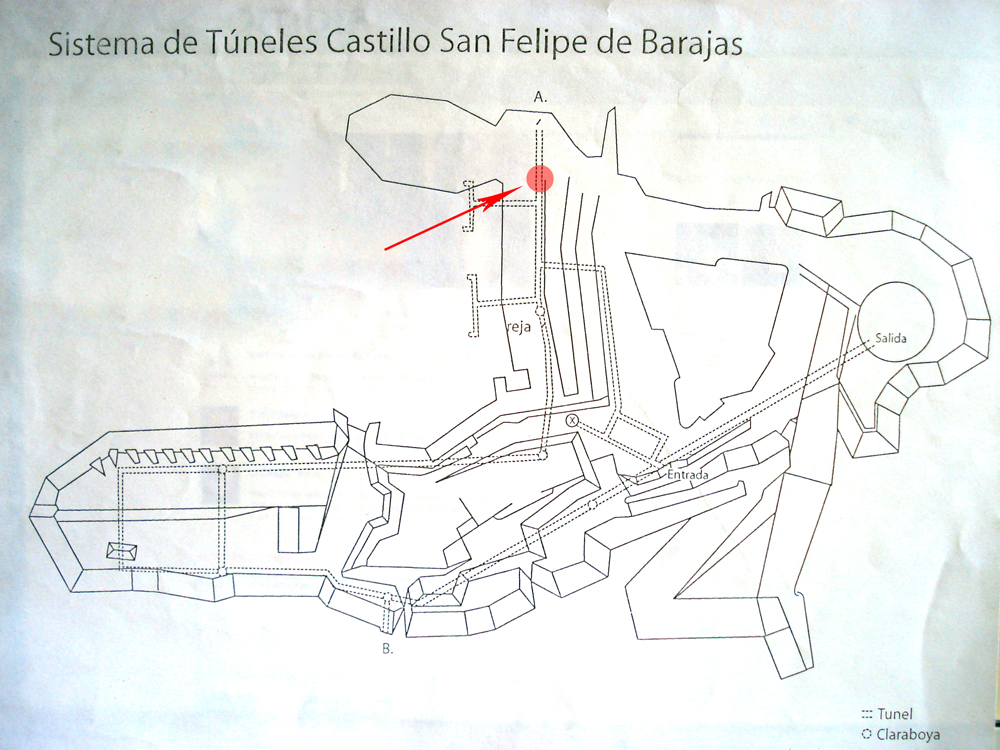
Map of the tunnels

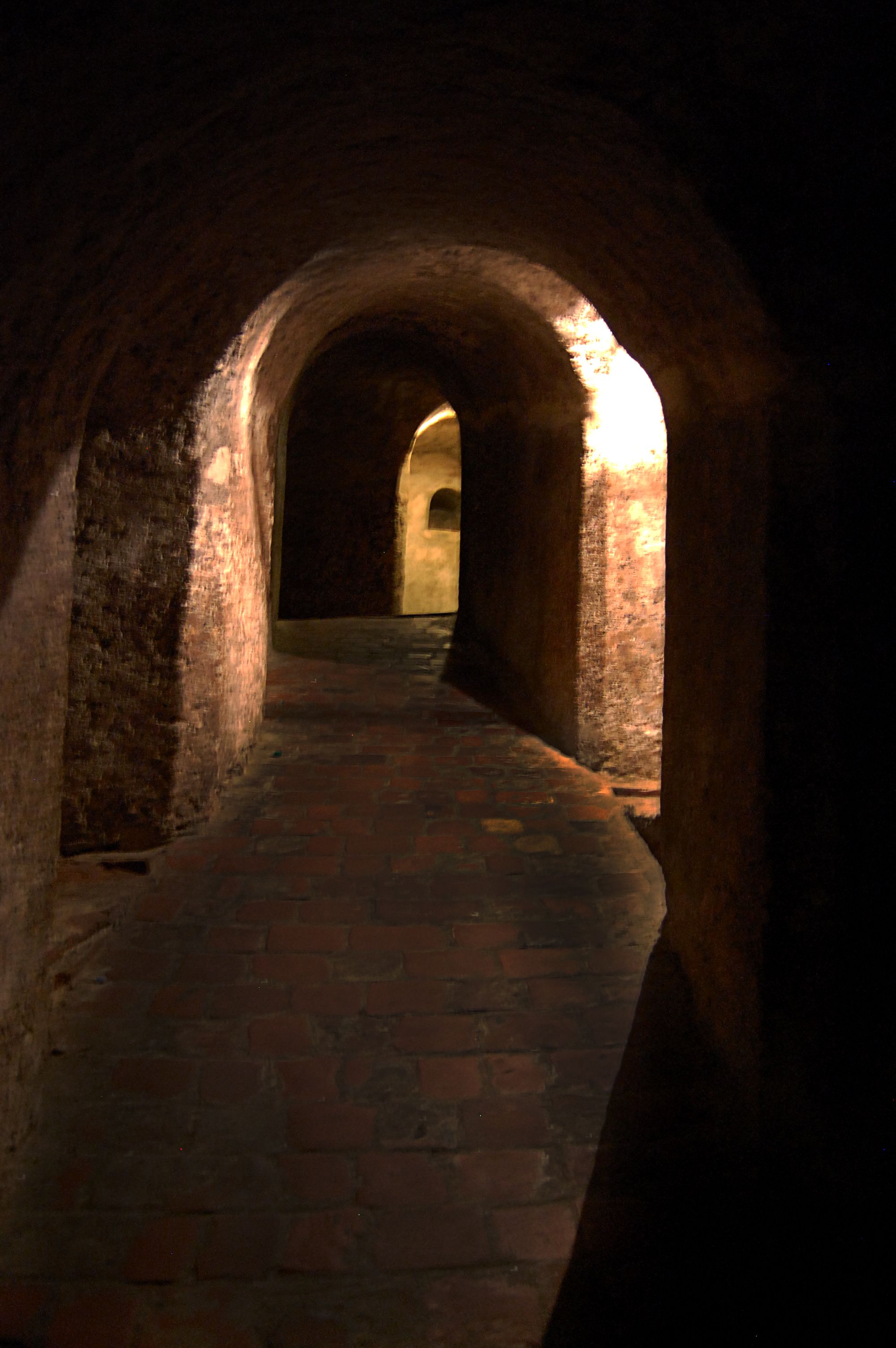
Internal corridors of the castle.

The fortification consists of a series of walls, wide at the base and narrow toward the parapet, forming a pattern of bunkers. The batteries and parapets protect one another. The castle is striking for its grand entrance and its maze of tunnels. It is the most formidable defensive complex of Spanish military architecture. It is 41 meters (135 ft.) above sea level.

Key features include the triangular Castillo de San Felipe de Barajas, surrounded by the batteries de Santa Barbara, de San Carlos y Los Apostles, Del Hornabeque, de la Cruz, de la Redencion, and de San Lazaro. The combined 68 guns faced away from the city. Joining the Media Luna causeway was a caponniere. The San Lazaro battery's terreplein included aljibes, while channels and breakwaters dealt with rainwater. The main underground gallery runs along the perimeter of the complex at sea level. Chambers within it could be exploded preventing the advance of overhead attackers.

== Status and conservation ==
For many decades, the castle was not well preserved. When it ceased to be used for military purposes, tropical vegetation covered the battlements and walls, and soil accumulated in the tunnels and trenches. In 1984, UNESCO listed the castle, along with the historic centre of the city of Cartagena, as a World Heritage Site.

Since 1990, the castle has served as a location for social and cultural events offered by the Colombian government in honour of foreign delegations at presidential summits, ministerial meetings, the Summit of the Non-Aligned Movement (1995) and the Summit of the Rio Group (2000), among others. The castle is open to visitors, but only some of the tunnels are open to viewing.

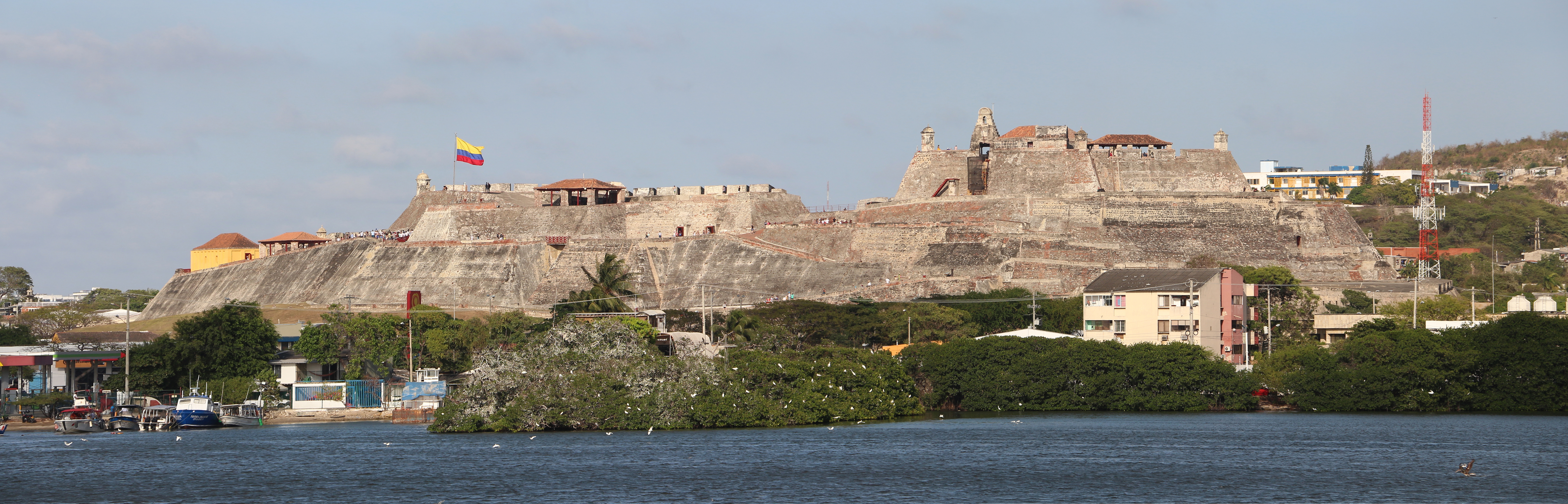
Panoramic of the Castillo San Felipe de Barajas.

== See also ==
- Spanish fortifications in America
