= Sancho Jimeno de Orozco =

Spanish military officer (1640–1707)

Sancho Jimeno de Orozco y Urnieta

Governor of Cartagena
- In office 1693–1695
- Monarch: Charles II
- Preceded by: Diego de los Rios

Personal details
- Born: 1640 Hondarribia, Spain
- Died: 1707 (aged 66–67) Cartagena, Colombia

Military service
- Allegiance: Spain
- Branch/service: Spanish Army

Don Sancho Jimeno de Orozco y Urnieta (1640–1707) was a Spanish military officer, nobleman, landowner and colonial administrator who served as the governor of Cartagena from 1693 to 1695. He was lord of the Castle of San Luis on the island of Tierra Bomba, a fort that he defended against French attackers during the raid on Cartagena de Indias in 1697. After the incumbent governor of Cartegena, Don Diego de los Rios, handed over the city to the French during the raid, Urnieta was called to govern Cartagena between 1698 and 1699.

== Life ==
Don Sancho was a Spanish nobleman of an impoverished family from the Basque Country. He served as a page of John of Austria the Younger, and fought in wars under the Spanish Netherlands. Later he traveled to Cartagena in the Americas in 1670. He married Maria Ines Blanco de Salcedo y Fernandez Calvo and had one child, Maria Teresa Jimeno Orozco y Blanco de Salcedo who married with Juan Fernandez de Miranda Gandarillas whose descendants formed part of the most important families of the Colombia until today.

Don Sancho owned farms near Cartagena, where he had cattle and slaves. He is recognized to have fought the runaway slaves in the surrounding area of Cartagena, when the slaves attempted to liberate other slaves and steal from travelers.

Under the government of Cartagena between 1693 and 1695, he was designated as the Lord of the Castle of San Luis de Bocachica in 1695. When the castle was attacked by French forces along with several pirates under the command of the Baron of Pointis and the freebooter Ducasse in April 1697.

== Defense of San Luis de Bocachica Castle ==
On 13 April 1697, 29 ships of Pointis' fleet were seen from Bocachica. They landed troops in the coast of Tierra Bomba island and laid sieged to the Castle of San Luis, preventing the arrival of reinforcements. Although the Spanish knew about the incoming French attack, as spies had discovered the departure of the French fleet from the port of Brest in January of that year. The city of Cartagena and its forts were poorly prepared when the pirates arrived. In the castle, there were only 139 men, some Spanish soldiers (most of which were slaves), with enough weapons and gunpowder, but with few foodstuffs. The food supply only arrived when the pirates surrounded the castle in two small ships. On 15 April 1697, the fort was bombarded by French warships each one with 80 cannons. The slaves rose up, asking to accept the defeat when the pirates reached the drawbridge. Don Sancho refused to surrender the castle despite the rebellion, so the French had to capture him inside the fortress while he was alone. When he was captured, he denied to surrender the castle of San Luis de Bocachica, an action that was considered admirable by Pointis. According to the popular legend, Don Sancho, as a sign to not accept defeat, broke his sword as Lord of the Castle.

On honor on Jimeno's bravery, Pointis gave him his own sword. Captured by the French, Pointis granted to Don Sancho a prison in his own farm in Isla Baru. He was held as a prisoner until the French left Cartagena in June 1697. Don Sancho was later re-designated as governor of Cartagena in 1698, after the escape of the former governor Don Diego de Los Rios, who handed over the city to the French in May 1697 without a fight.

At the beginning of the 18th century, Don Sancho was judged by the Spanish tribunals, on suspect that the Spanish public servants were corrupted by French spies before the attack. However, the story of the sword of Pointis was declared as an evidence against Don Sancho. After many years through the penal process, he was declared innocent.

== Legacy ==
The ability of Don Sancho to defend the fort with a small force convinced the Spanish to increase the defenses on Cartagena Bay during the following years, and other European powers were convinced that in later attacks they will need more forces and strong artillery.

Two writers stand out by their work on the legend of Don Sancho. The recognized Colombian writer of the 19th century Soledad Acosta de Samper, who wrote an emotive love story of Don Sancho to his wife during the Raid of Cartagena; and the poet Alvaro Miranda, who in 1982 wrote the poem Indiada, los escritos de Don Sancho Jimeno.

In Cartagena, there exists a street called calle de Don Sancho, that is usually visited by tourists.

The Colombian Navy had a ship called ARC Sancho Jimeno that served between 1953 and 1974.
