= Spanish fortifications in America =

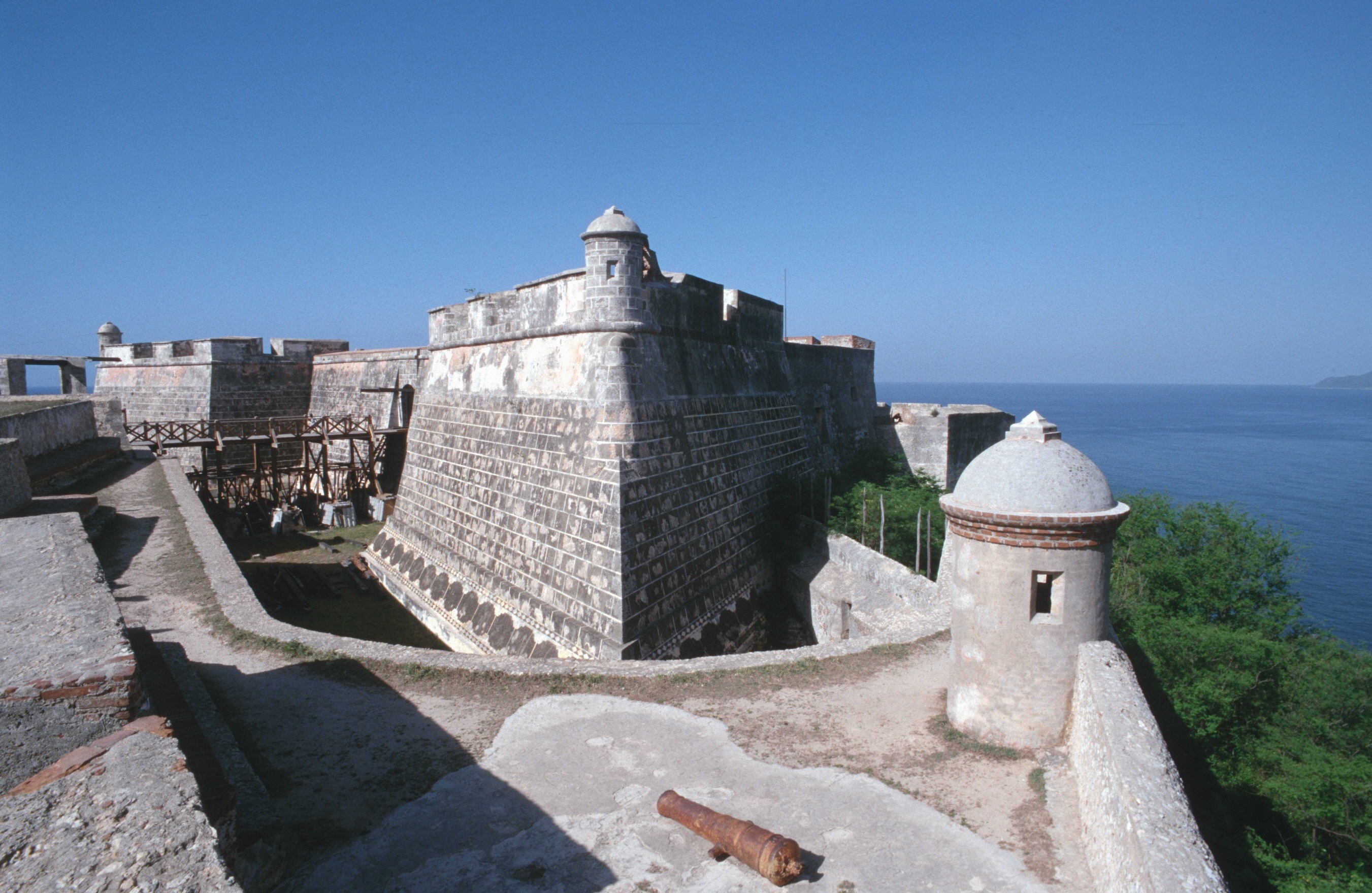
Castle of San Pedro de la Roca. Santiago de Cuba, Cuba.

The coastal 'fortifications' of Spain in America are the works of military engineering that bear witness to the four hundred years of Spanish presence in America. They were built from northern California to Tierra del Fuego. Their purpose was the defense of port towns against the attack of the fleets of the English, French and Dutch armies, as well as corsairs and pirates.

== History ==
Defense fortifications were present from the beginning of the conquest of America, military actions and diplomatic efforts that resulted in Spain's control of a vast territory. In addition to walling the populations, castles were built in the highest part, which allowed the control of the territory and allowed an effective defense.

From the reign of Felipe II onwards, notable efforts were made to build new fortifications or expand existing ones in the face of the annexationist threat from other European nations.

By 1550 certain strategic ports had become fortified enclaves: Santo Domingo, Hispaniola, and San Juan, Puerto Rico (centers of Spanish power in the Caribbean islands); Cartagena (guardian of northern South America and incursions through the Isthmus of Panama area); Nombre de Dios and later Portobelo on the isthmus; San Juan de Ulúa in Veracruz (key point and entrance to Mexico); and Havana (strategic center and meeting point for groups of ships to undertake their return voyage to Spain). Other secondary fortifications were also built in Yucatán, Florida, Central America, Venezuela and the islands to discourage attackers and foreign settlers. The first defenses were simple earthen forts armed with a few culverins and small-caliber cannons. But the capture of Havana by French attackers in 1555 highlighted the need for larger and more resistant fortifications and forts. By the end of the 16th century and during the 17th century, beginning with Sir Francis Drake's circumnavigation in (1577–1580), English, French, Dutch and buccaneer raiders ravaged Spanish trade and ports along the Pacific coasts and forced the Spanish to fortify El Callao, Panama, Acapulco, and other settlements and ports.

In the Caribbean and the Gulf of Mexico, the construction of colossal constructions designed by Spanish and Italian military engineers incorporated revolutionary architectural changes derived from advances in Europe. In 1563 the engineer Francisco Calona began redesigning Havana's fortifications to incorporate modern bastions, cannon platforms, thick-walled vaults, and a dry moat. These improvements provided the defenders with a very good firing range against attackers while providing protection against cannon attacks by the assaulting forces. The capture of the fortress of San Juan de Ulúa and the city of Veracruz (1568) by John Hawkins, and Drake's series of attacks through the Caribbean between 1585 and 1586, during which he captured Santo Domingo and Cartagena, prompted Philip II to send the renowned Italian engineer Battista Antonelli to design modern fortifications at San Juan de Ulúa and evaluate the Caribbean defenses. Antonelli's proposals led to the construction of a costly but quite effective system of fortifications that in the case of Havana resisted attempts to capture it for almost 200 years until 1762. Indeed, further attacks by Drake and Hawkins in 1595 against the improved fortifications failed at San Juan, Puerto Rico, and at Cartagena, yellow fever, malaria and dysentery, and other tropical diseases forced the attacking troops to desist in their attempts. Drake attacked and razed Nombre de Dios on the isthmus, after which the town was abandoned and activity was concentrated in Portobelo.

After the signing of the Treaty of London in 1604, European competitors occupied the vacant territories in America, which became excellent stalking points from which to launch more planned and larger attacks. Simultaneously small forces of buccaneers, often supported by European allies, plundered and ravaged the ports. They massacred the Portobelo barracks in 1668 and managed to capture numerous Spanish coastal towns and fortifications. On several occasions, buccaneers forces crossed the isthmus, capturing Spanish ships, and captured weakly fortified Pacific ports in Central America, Mexico, and Peru. While the great fortresses of the Caribbean should have been impregnable against such attacks, problems with the availability of troops in barracks and difficulties in maintaining large-scale works, artillery, and stores provided opportunities for surprise lightning attacks.

As revenues declined during the 17th century, poorly recruited and trained Spanish troops in the Americas lacked the determination to defend the fortifications against buccaneer attack. Campeche fell in 1672, and in 1683 a buccaneer force stormed the Fortress of San Juan de Ulúa and captured Veracruz. They sacked the town, killed 300 of its 6,000 inhabitants, and even threatened to massacre the entire population if a ransom was not paid. With the arrival of the annual Spanish fleet, Mexican military forces from Puebla, Orizaba, Jalapa, and Cordoba reoccupied the town and found destroyed buildings and the bodies of people and animals rotting in the streets. As a consequence of this disaster, Mexican authorities organized special tribunals to investigate and punish military personnel who had not defended the fortifications effectively.

During the wars against Great Britain in the late 18th and early 19th centuries, Spanish forces and fortifications helped resist and repel British attacks on Cartagena de Indias (1741), La Guaira [1743], Puerto Cabello (1743), San Juan de Puerto Rico (1797), and discourage plans to invade Mexico in the period 1805 to 1807. Although the fortress of San Juan de Ulúa was the last bastion of Spanish power in Mexico until 1825, it did not serve the Spaniards to reconquer the viceroyalty. Throughout the 19th century, many of the fortifications were converted into prisons and penitentiaries, rather than serving as sentries to protect strategic ports against foreign advances.

== List of Remaining Fortifications ==
=== Chile ===
Fort	Location	Image	Notes
Valdivian Fort System	Valdivia, Chile		

=== Colombia ===
Fort	Location	Image	Notes
Bastion of San Ignacio	Cartagena, Colombia		
Bastion of Santo Domingo	Cartagena, Colombia		
Castillo San Felipe de Barajas	Cartagena, Colombia		
Castle of San Luis de Bocachica	Cartagena, Colombia		
San Sebastián del Pastelillo Fort	Cartagena, Colombia		

=== Cuba ===
Fort	Location	Image	Notes
Castillo de Atarés	Havana, Cuba		
Castillo de Jagua	Cienfuegos, Cuba		
Castillo de los Tres Reyes Del Morro	Havana, Cuba		
Castillo de San Pedro de la Roca	Santiago de Cuba, Cuba		
Castillo San Salvador de la Punta	Havana, Cuba		
La Cabaña	Havana, Cuba		

=== Dominican Republic ===
Fort	Location	Image	Notes
Fortaleza Ozama	Santo Domingo, Dominican Republic		
Fortaleza San Felipe	Puerto Plata, Dominican Republic		

=== Guatemala ===
Fort	Location	Image	Notes
Castle of San Felipe de Lara	San Felipe, Guatemala		

=== Honduras ===
Fort	Location	Image	Notes
Fortaleza de San Fernando	Omoa, Honduras		

=== Mexico ===
Fort	Location	Image	Notes
Fort of San Diego	Acapulco, Mexico		
Fort of San Miguel	Campeche, Mexico		
San Carlos Fortress	Perote, Mexico		
San Juan de Ulúa	Veracruz, Mexico		

=== Nicaragua ===
Fort	Location	Image	Notes
Fortress of the Immaculate Conception	El Castillo, Nicaragua		

=== Panama ===
Fort	Location	Image	Notes
Chagres and Fort San Lorenzo	Colon, Panama		

=== Peru ===
Fort	Location	Image	Notes
Real Felipe Fortress	Callao Bay, Peru		

=== Puerto Rico ===
Fort	Location	Image	Notes
Castillo San Crisóbal	San Juan, Puerto Rico		
Castillo San Felipe del Morro	San Juan, Puerto Rico		
Walls of Old San Juan	San Juan, Puerto Rico		

=== United States ===
Fort	Location	Image	Notes
Castillo de San Marcos	St. Augustine, Florida		Built by the Spanish from 1672-1695 to protect the settlement of Saint Augustine on the western shore of Matanzas Bay. It was renamed Fort St. Mark when the British gained control over Florida after the Treaty of Paris. The Spanish regained the fort and Florida after the Peace of Paris (1783) and restored the fort's original name. It then became Fort Marion after Florida was ceded to the United States in 1821. It remained Fort Marion until its original name was restored in 1942.
Fort Barrancas	Warrington, Florida		
Fort Matanzas	St. Johns County, Florida		
Presidio La Bahía	Goliad, Texas		
Presidio San Luis de las Amarillas	Menard, Texas		
Presidio San Antonio de Béxar	San Antonio, Texas		
Presidio San Agustín del Tucsón	Tucson, Arizona		
Presidio of Santa Barbara	Santa Barbara, California		

=== Uruguay ===
Fort	Location	Image	Notes
Fortaleza del Cerro	Montevideo, Uruguay		
Fortaleza de Santa Teresa	Departamento de Rocha, Uruguay		

=== Venezuela ===
Fort	Location	Image	Notes
Araya Castle	Araya, Venezuela		
Fortín Solano	Puerto Cabello, Venezuela		

== Bibliography ==
- Paul E. Hoffman, The Spanish Crown and the Defense of the Caribbean, 1535–1585: Precedent, Patrimonialism, and Royal Parsimony (1980).
- John H. Parry, The Spanish Seaborne Empire (1966)
- Arthur P. Newton, The European Nations in the West Indies, 1493–1688 (1933).
- Peter T. Bradley, The Lure of Peru: Maritime Intrusion into the South Sea, 1598–1701 (1989).
- Clarence H. Haring, The Buccaneers in the West Indies in the Seventeenth Century (1910).
- Juan Juárez Moreno, Corsarios y piratas en Veracruz y Campeche (1972).
- Richard Pares, War and Trade in the West Indies, 1739–1763 (1936);
- David Syrett, The Siege and Capture of Havana, 1762 (1970);
- Richard Harding, Amphibious Warfare in the Eighteenth Century: The British Expedition to the West Indies, 1740–1742 (1991).
- Antonio Calderón Quijano, Historia de las fortificaciones en Nueva España (1953),
- Guillermo Lohmann Villena, Las defensas militares de Lima y Callao (1964).
- Blanes Martín, Tamara. Fortificaciones del Caribe. La Habana, Cuba: Letras cubanas, 2001.
- Marchena Fernández, Juan. Ejército y milicias en el mundo colonial americano. Madrid: Editorial MAPFRE, 1992.
- Serrano Alvarez, José Manuel. Fortificaciones y tropas: El gasto militar en tierra firme, 1700–1788. Sevilla: Diputación de Sevilla, 2004.
