= Castle of San Luis de Bocachica =

Military fortress in Colombia

Coordinates: 10.319313°N 75.581205°W

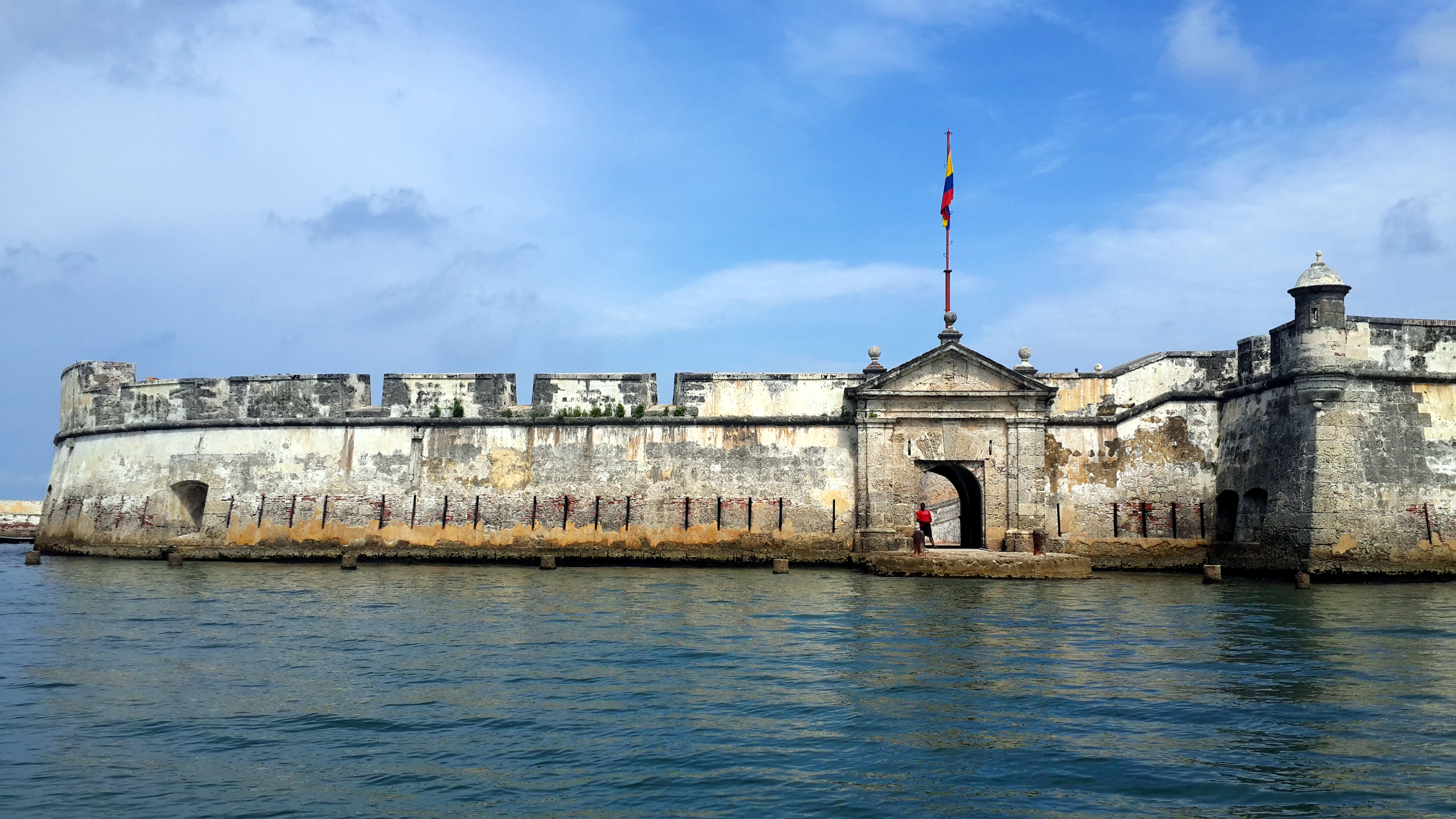
Castle of San Fernando de Bocachica, built over the ruins of the old castle

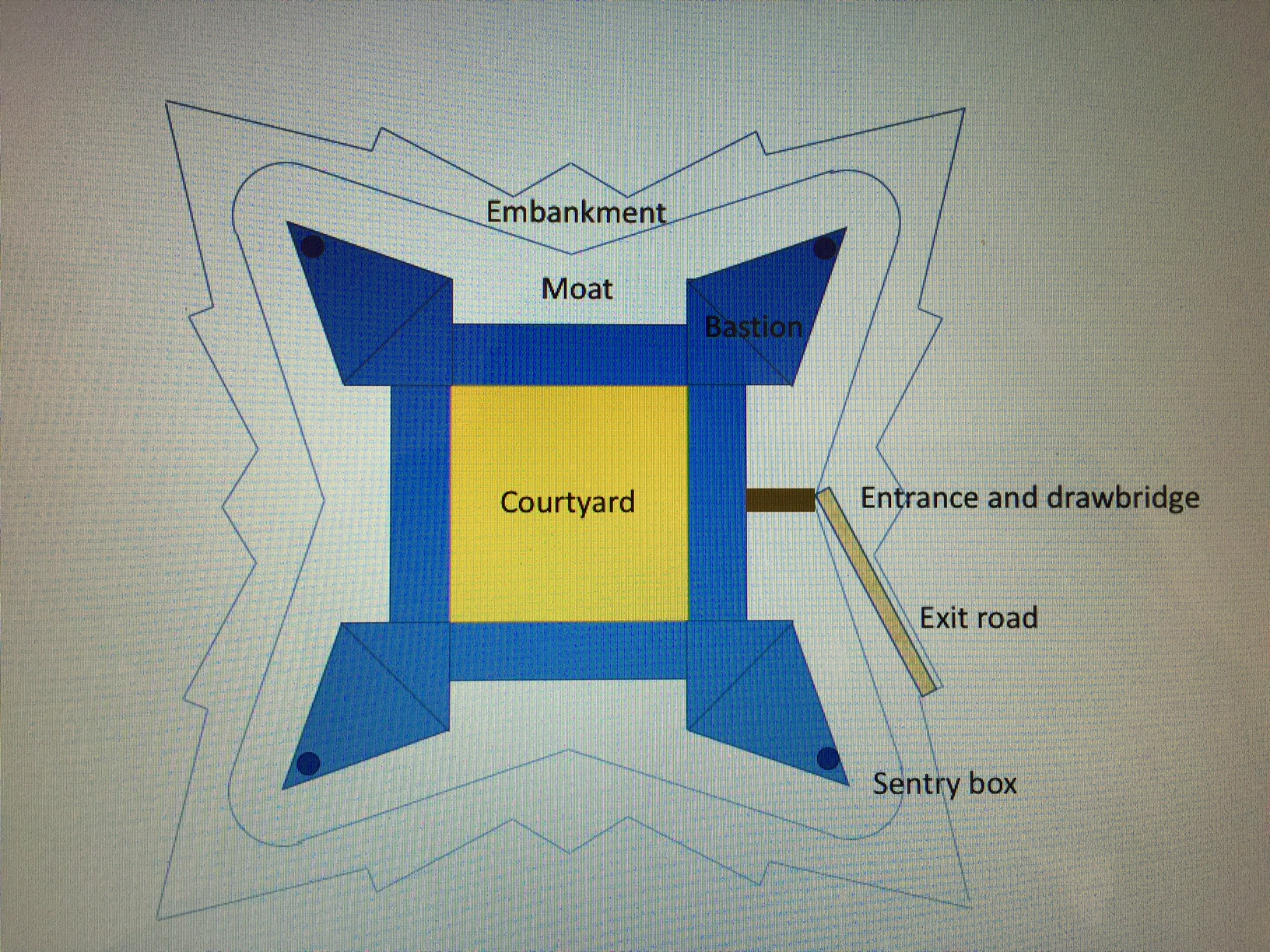
Blueprint of the first Castle, the San Luis de Bocachica in Cartagena de Indias

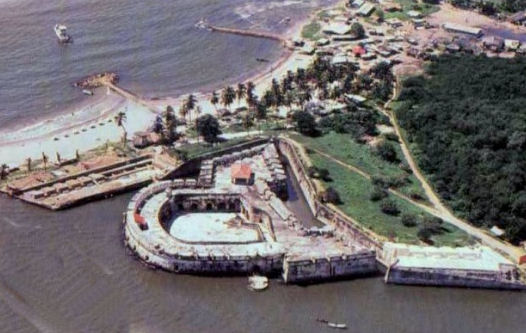
Aerial view of the castle

The Castle of San Luis de Bocachica, also called Fort St. Louis, was a military fortress that defended Cartagena, Colombia. The Spanish built it in the 17th century. After it suffered war damage in the 18th century, they erected a new coastal fortification, the Castle of San Fernando on the same site.

The site on the Island of Tierra Bomba controlled deep-water access to Cartagena's harbour by the channel of Bocachica (or "small entrance" as opposed to Bocagrande, the "big entrance").

== History ==
Work on the fort started in 1646 by the engineer Juan de Somovilla and its name was related with the governor Luis Fernandez de Cordoba.

The Castle was attacked several times with the most famous being the French Raid on Cartagena in 1697 and the British Attack on Cartagena in 1741.

=== 1697 attack ===
During the War of the League of Augsburg, French troops and pirates, attacked the castle on 13 April 1697 and took it on 15 April 1697, but the castle was not destroyed because of the heroic defense of Don Sancho Jimeno and because of the strategic position.

=== 1741 attack ===
During the War of Jenkins' Ear, Cartagena was sieged by English troops. On 13 March 1741 the British navy captured and severely damaged the castle, and then put it on fire, destroying it completely, during the retreat.

In 1753, the building of a new fortress started, the Castle of San Fernando de Bocachica, by the engineer Antonio de Arévalo, over the ruins of the old castle. The fortress was completed in 1759. It continues today as an important tourist attraction.

== Bibliography ==
- Viceroy Sebastián de Eslava (1741). Diary of everything that happened in the attack on the forts of Boca Chica, and the siege of the city of Cartagena de las Indias: made up of the documents sent to His Majesty... by the Viceroy of Santa Fè Don S. de E. (in Spanish).
