= Admiral Neville =

Admiral Neville may refer to:

- John Neville, 3rd Baron Neville (c. 1337–1388), English admiral
- Richard Neville, 16th Earl of Warwick (1428–1471), English Lord High Admiral
- William Neville, 1st Earl of Kent (c. 1405–1463), English Lord Admiral

== See also ==
- John Nevell (died 1697), British Royal Navy rear admiral
