= Bastion of San Ignacio =

Bastion in Cartagena de Indias, Colombia

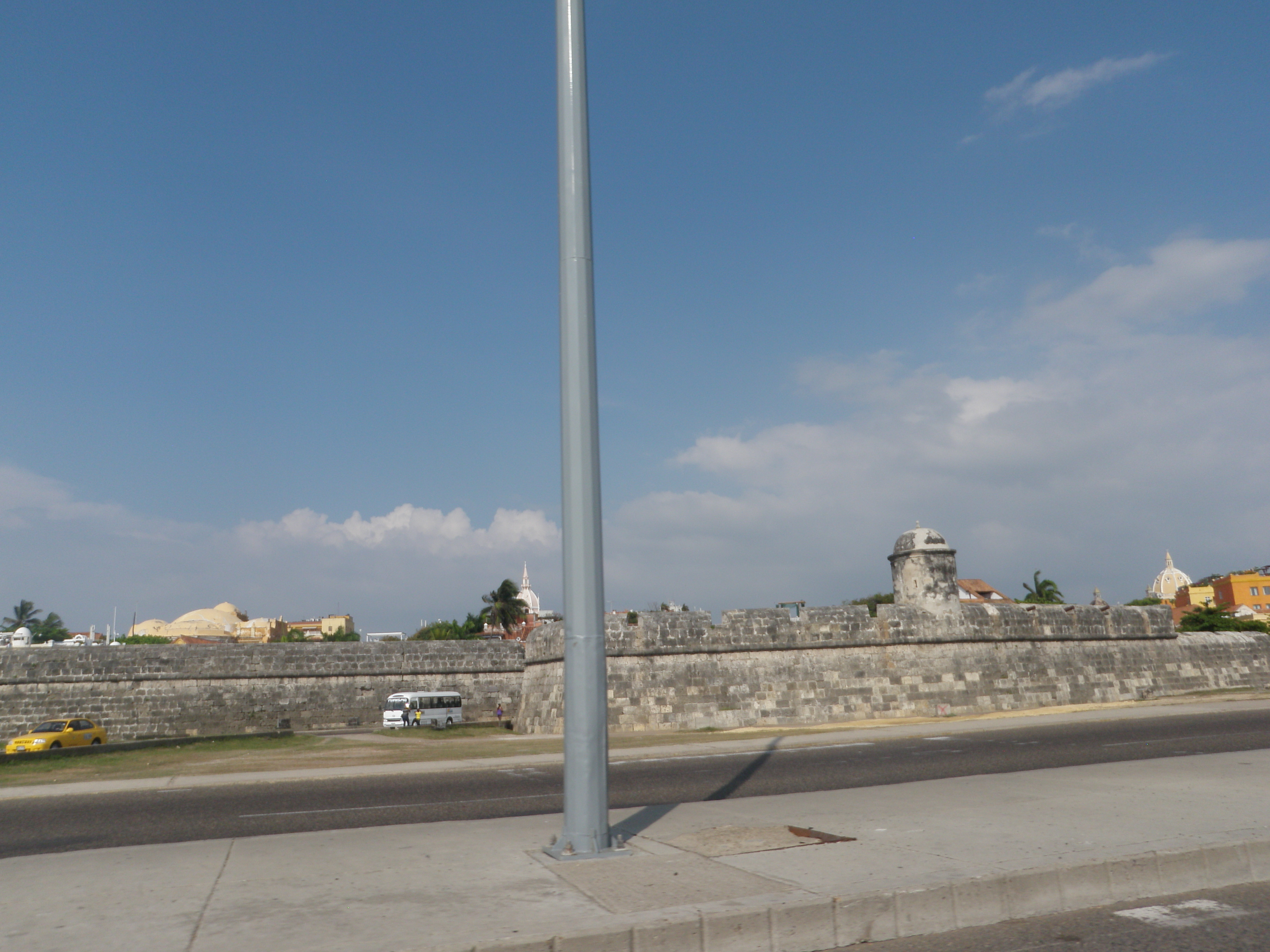
Bastion of San Ignacio

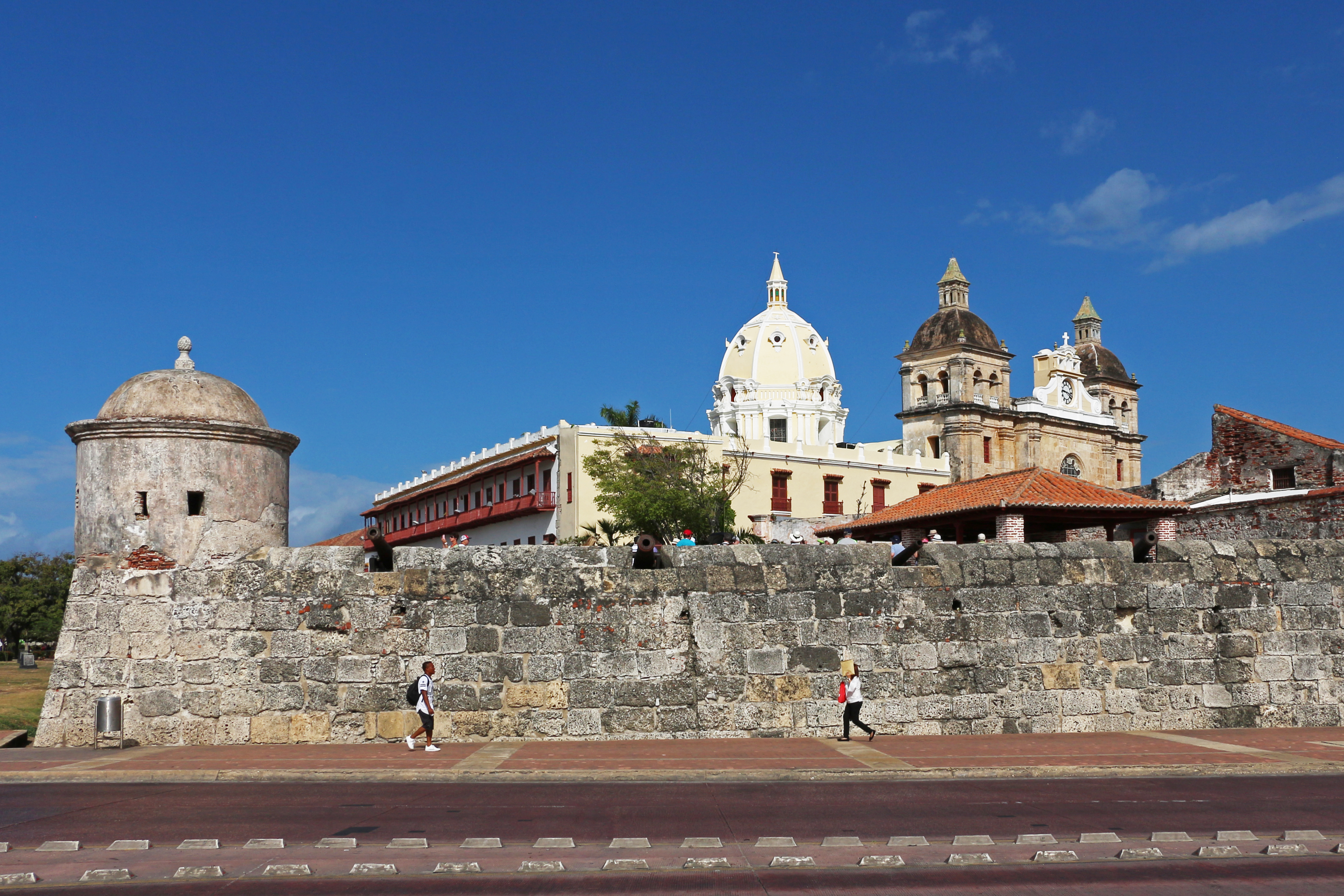
Bastion of San Ignacio

The Baluarte de San Ignacio is a bastion located in Cartagena de Indias, in Colombia. This bastion, originally called the Bastión de los Moros, is located on the side of the House of the Jesuits and is the work of Cristóbal de Roda. It is part of the extensive fortifications built by the Spanish to defend Cartagena de Indias.

When it was completed by 1630 by Cristóbal de Roda, commissioned by governor Francisco de Murga, the cannons of San Ignacio pointed towards the Bay of Las Ánimas, the same one that today receives the traffic of cabotage, and that then it extended by all the beach. Therefore, its mission was to discourage any attempt against the pier or against the banks and to contribute to the covering of Bocagrande (another entrance to the Bay of Cartagena).

However, this purpose was threatened when the Society of Jesus built its college in the contiguous curtain. In fact, the neighborhood between a religious building and a military building generated all sorts of disputes, which were finally settled by the Spanish Crown, by order to build, on behalf of the Jesuits, a curtain of new wall a few meters ahead, leaving between the new and the old one a step of round, or way to watch from the fortification.

The curtains are those straight and steep stretches of a "square front" that connects two bastions, in this case between those of San Ignacio and San Francisco Javier.

Once the curtain was built it became necessary to move the bastion to the vicinity of the church of San Ignacio, from where it took its current name. Later, in 1730, the engineer Juan de Herrera y Sotomayor gave the bastion of San Ignacio its present dimension and annexed a Baroque garita, while it rescues its access ramp.

From the house-college of the Jesuits (now the Naval Museum) it can see this bastion in all its splendor.

== See also ==
- List of colonial buildings in Cartagena, Colombia
- Spanish fortifications in America
