= John Nevell =

Royal Navy admiral

Vice-Admiral John Nevell
- Died: 17 August 1697
- Burial place: Elizabeth City, Virginia
- Military career
- Allegiance: Kingdom of England
- Branch: Royal Navy
- Service years: 1673–1697
- Rank: Vice-Admiral
- Commands: Ann (yacht); Bristol; Rupert; Garland; Crown; Elizabeth; Henrietta; Royal Sovereign; Kent; Britannia; Mediterranean Fleet
- Conflicts: Third Anglo-Dutch War; Nine Years' War: Battle of Beachy Head; Battle of Barfleur

Vice-Admiral John Nevell (or Neville, Nevill or Nevil; died 17 August 1697) was an officer in the Royal Navy. He is best known for the failed attempt to intercept the treasure-laden fleet of Pointis after the raid on Cartagena in 1697. He died later that year in Virginia from yellow fever.

== Origins and early career ==
Nevell was descended from a junior branch of the Nevilles of Abergavenny, being the great grandson of Henry Nevill, 6th Baron Bergavenny. He served as a volunteer during the early part of the Third Anglo-Dutch War, and promoted to lieutenant aboard the captured French vessel Ruby in 1673. He was appointed to the Sapphire on 29 June 1675, part of the Mediterranean squadron commanded by Sir John Narborough. The Sapphire's captain, Thomas Harman, was killed in battle with an Algerine corsair on 9 September 1677 and replaced by Cloudesley Shovell, who became Nevell's lifelong friend. In November 1679 he led eighteen sailors in battle against a Moorish attack on Tangier.

On 23 December 1680 Arthur Herbert, commander of the Mediterranean squadron, appointed Nevell second lieutenant aboard his flagship, the Bristol. On 23 February 1681 the admiral gave him command of the Ann yacht "in justice to Mr Nevills merit whose behaviour on many occasions has struck envy itself dumb." However, a dispute over Herbert's authority to make such an appointment led to Nevell's return to the Bristol as first lieutenant on 10 June.

Herbert returned to England in 1682 after successful treaty negotiations with Algiers in which Nevell played an important part. Nevell was left behind as consul, though Herbert wrote he was "much fitter to serve the king as a sea captain than in the post he now is, for I am afraid his head is not very well turned that way." He was also left with a blank captain's commission to command the Bristol, and when his wife petitioned Charles II for his return to England the following year, he was able to sail home in that vessel.

== Captain ==
In 1685 he was made captain of the Rupert and ordered to prepare it as a flagship for Herbert to contest the Monmouth Rebellion. The rebellion was quashed before the ship was ready, and Nevell was transferred to the Garland, a guard ship in Portsmouth harbour. He was given command of the Crown on 1 August 1686, and sailed to the Mediterranean under Sir Roger Strickland. He conveyed Sir William Trumbull, the new Ambassador at Constantinaple to Turkey in the summer of 1687 and returned home the following year. Despite his close connection to Herbert, who had carried the Invitation to William to the Prince of Orange that summer and was now preparing a Dutch invasion, Nevell was given command of the Elizabeth on 25 September 1688.

Following the Glorious Revolution he remained aboard the Elizabeth, where he served as Sir John Berry's flag captain in February 1689. In March, he was given command of the Henrietta until it was wrecked in Plymouth Sound on 25 December 1689. He was made captain of the Royal Sovereign in February 1690, and reunited with Herbert (now Lord Torrington) when he made that ship his flagship in the Battle of Beachy Head. In September of that year he took command of the Kent, and was present at Marlborough's Siege of Cork in October, marching with the grenadiers under Lord Colchester in the final assault. In December, the Kent was the venue of Torrington's court-martial on his conduct at Beachy Head, at which Nevell gave evidence. He was still in command of this vessel on 19 May 1692, when it formed part of Cloudesley Shovell's red squadron at the Battle of Barfleur. In January 1693 he was given command of the Britannia, which carried the flags of the joint commanders-in-chief: Admirals Henry Killegrew, Ralph Delaval and Cloudesley Shovell.

== Admiral ==
On 7 July 1693 he was promoted to the rank of Rear Admiral, and with his flag aboard the Neptune cruised the waters off Dunkirk with a small squadron. In December he headed south aboard the Royal Oak to join the Mediterranean Fleet under Sir Francis Wheler. Nevell survived the storm in the Strait of Gibraltar which led to the loss of Wheler and much of the squadron on 19 February 1694, collected the remnants and led them back to Cádiz. Nevell had wanted to continue into the Mediterranean, but was overruled by Dutch admiral Callenburgh who had taken command on Wheler's death. He spent the next two years as second in command in the Mediterranean, first under Edward Russell, then under George Rooke.

In October 1696 he was promoted to vice admiral and given command of the Mediterranean Fleet, sailing for Cádiz on 3 November in the Cambridge with a fleet of fifteen men-of-war and many merchantmen. In December, news reached London of what John Charnock describes as "a project more piratical than national" on the part of the French. A fleet was being assembled under Bernard Desjean, Baron de Pointis to attack the Spanish West Indian trade. This would adversely affect British commercial interests too, so plans were put in place to stop it.

On arrival at Cádiz, Nevell was ordered to sail for Madeira where he would rendezvous with a squadron under second-in-command George Mees before heading for the West Indies to intercept de Pointis. The junction was made, and the combined fleet arrived in Barbados on 17 April before pushing on to reach Antigua on 3 May. Here, a council of war determined that their next destination should be Puerto Rico, but soon after news arrived that de Pointis had left Hispaniola with a fleet of 26 ships. Consequently, Nevell headed for Jamaica, both to take on fresh water and to defend it from possible attack. It was while off the eastern end of this island on 15 May that Nevell first heard of de Pointis' attack on Cartagena.

Adverse winds slowed his advance to Cartagena, and he was only halfway there when the homeward bound French fleet was sighted on 27 May. Nevell immediately gave chase, but had difficulty closing with his opponents, who had nothing to gain from a naval encounter. The pursuit continued for five days, but failed to bring the French to battle, the only real success being when a Spanish prize was cut off and captured by Princess Ann and Hollandia. It was conveyed to Jamaica and found to contain plate, gunpowder and slaves worth a total of £200,000 (equivalent to £31,726,000 in 2025). On another occasion the Warwick got close enough to capture a flyboat. Unfortunately, the captured vessel was serving as a hospital ship, carrying yellow fever which was already ravaging the French fleet and began to spread through the Anglo-Dutch.

Nevell abandoned the chase and returned to Cartagena on 1 June to find that de Pointis' buccaneer allies had returned to the city and sacked it again. Nevell had difficulty persuading the inhabitants to leave the woods in which they had hidden and return to their homes. From there the fleet went to Havana, intending to escort the Spanish treasure fleet back to Europe. On the way, Mees was detached to attack Petit-Goâve on Haiti. The raid took place on 23 June, and resulted in the firing of the town. The fleet reunited a few days later, but Mees fell ill with fever and died on 20 July.

The fleet arrived in Havana on 23 July, fever-wracked and in need of water and repairs, but the governor refused them entry to the port. The "general of the galleons" commanding the treasure fleet declined Nevell's offer of an escort, saying that he had no orders that would warrant him accepting such protection. Disappointed, and falling prey to illness himself, Nevell headed for Florida and then Virginia, where he died whilst anchored in the James River on 17 August 1697. He was buried in the Elizabeth City county church on the same day. He left a wife, Mary Nevell, and two daughters, Mary and Elizabeth. The fever had claimed the lives of the admiral, six Royal Navy captains and 1300 sailors, in the Dutch part of the fleet all but one of the captains died. It fell to one of the surviving British captains, Thomas Dilkes to lead the fleet home.

John Charnock describes Nevell as "a man of approved courage, ability, and integrity, against whom the only charge the bitterest of his enemies could with propriety make, was, that he was unfortunate".
