= Bastion of Santo Domingo, Cartagena =

Coordinates: 10.42446°N 75.55405°W

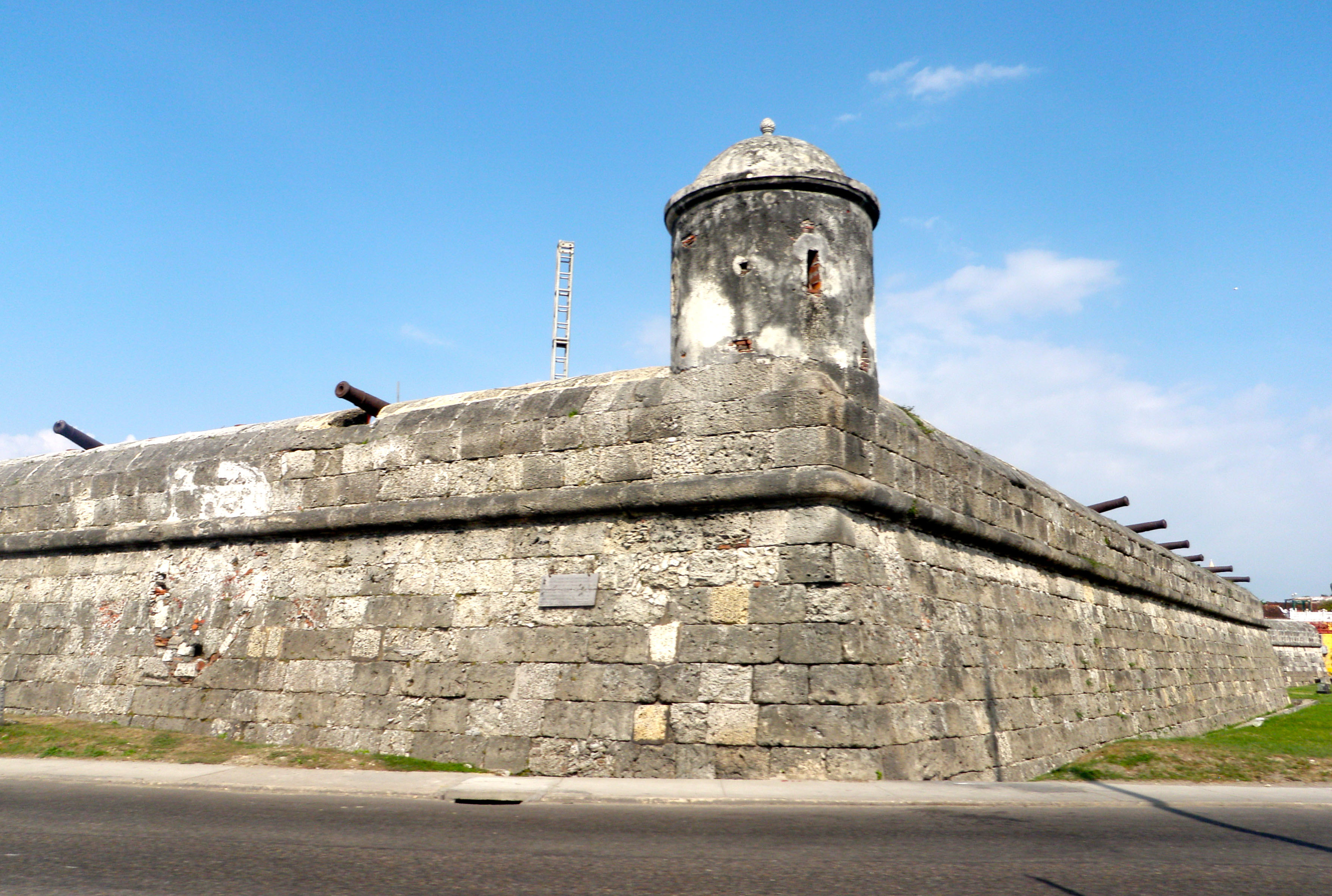
Watchtower of the Bastion of Santo Domingo

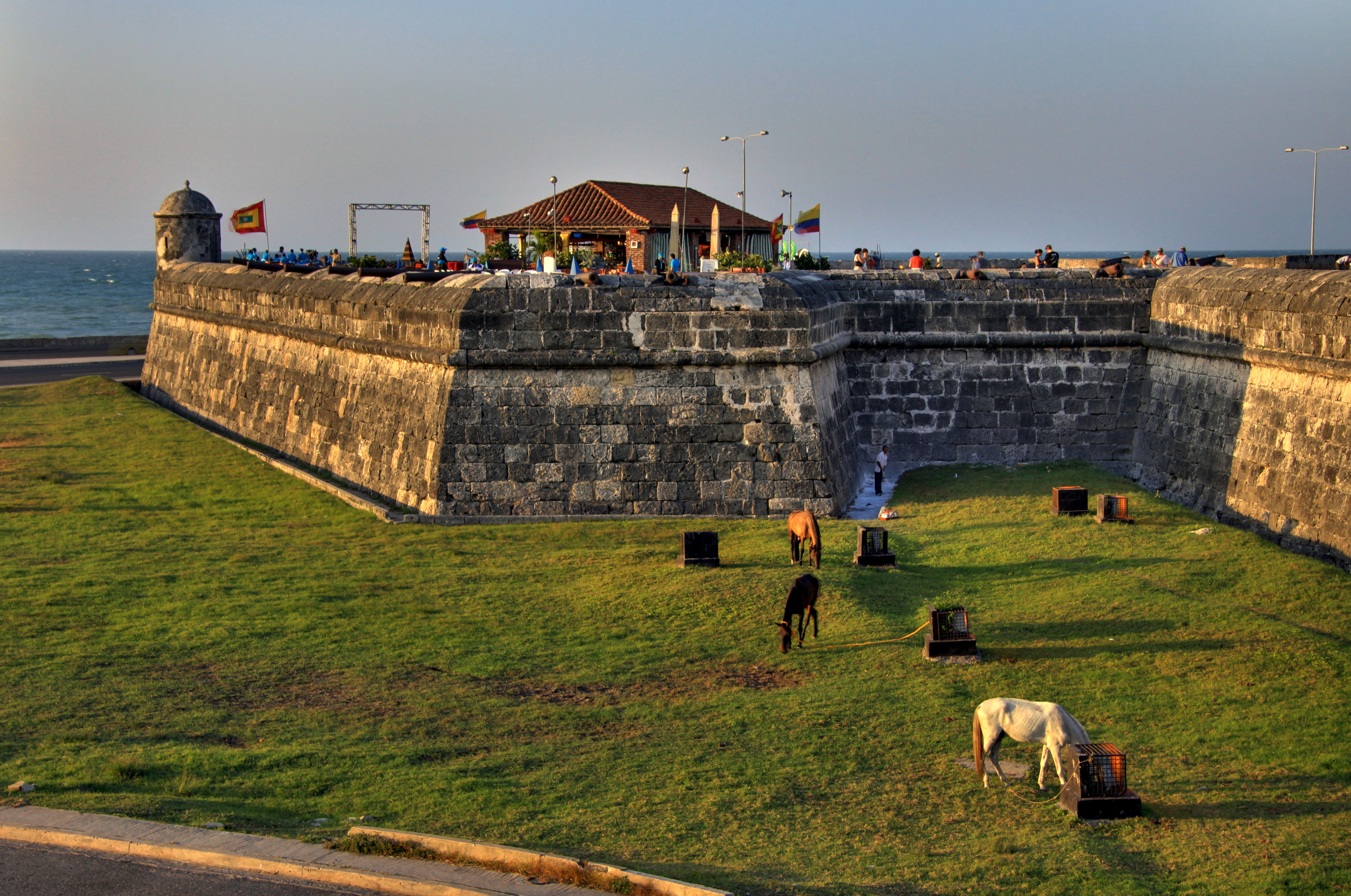
Bastion of Santo Domingo

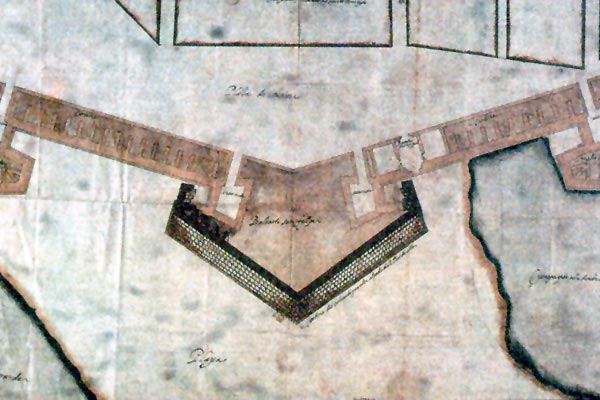
Plan of the Bastion of Santo Domingo of the early 17th century, where the construction of the Walls of Cartagena began.

The Baluarte de Santo Domingo is a bastion located in Cartagena de Indias, in Colombia. The bastion of Santo Domingo has a particular importance, since it is the origin of the construction of the city walls of Cartagena de Indias in the early 17th century. This work of fortification was conceived around 1602 by the engineer Battista Antonelli and his nephew Cristóbal de Roda, also engineer, who decided to build it on the avenue through which the pirate Francis Drake had penetrated, in 1586.

The city did not have stone barracks, and its few defenders, placed in an improvised trench in the strait of the isthmus that separated Bocagrande from the city, just where Avenida Santander is nowadays, could not face the invader. From this episode is a curious document written in Latin and signed by Drake, where he acknowledged receipt of the formidable rescue that the authorities were forced to pay, and a few years later, the decision to close the avenue of Bocagrande with the bastion of Santo Domingo .

Therefore, the bastion protected the access to the city from the peninsula of Bocagrande, constituting itself in the first one of the great bastions of the walls of Cartagena.

This bastion is model of the proportions regulated by the Italian school of fortification. In its collar the low squares are opened, that is to say, the lower parts of the esplanade of the bastion, where in the 16th and 17th centuries it was customary to locate the cannons. At the beginning of the 18th century, during the considerable reforms of Juan de Herrera y Sotomayor, the lower squares disappeared, but the vaults that served as access remained on both sides of the ramp.

From that same period they must date the canals, which carry the waters from the most hidden cracks of the bastion to the public cistern. Herrera also added the large watchtower, which crowns the main angle of the bastion and which points to the sea.

Don Juan de Herrera also moved the gate puerta de San Felipe from the left side to the opposite flank of the bastion, where it can still walk quietly.

This bastion was also known by the name of San Felipe and Santa María, but it was the name of the gate puerta de Santo Domingo, also contiguous to the bastion, which gave it the name it carries until today.

== See also ==
- List of colonial buildings in Cartagena, Colombia
- Spanish fortifications in America
