= HMS Tilbury (1733) =

Ship of the line of the Royal Navy

History

Great Britain
- Name: HMS Tilbury
- Ordered: 15 December 1726
- Builder: Chatham Dockyard
- Launched: 2 June 1733
- Fate: Burnt, 1742

General characteristics
- Class & type: 1719 Establishment 60-gun fourth-rate ship of the line
- Tons burthen: 962
- Length: 144 ft (43.9 m) (gundeck)
- Beam: 39 ft (11.9 m)
- Depth of hold: 16 ft 5 in (5.0 m)
- Propulsion: Sails
- Sail plan: Full-rigged ship
- Armament: 60 guns: Gundeck: 24 × 24-pdrs; Upper gundeck: 26 × 9-pdrs; Quarterdeck: 8 × 6-pdrs; Forecastle: 2 × 6-pdrs

HMS Tilbury was a 60-gun fourth-rate ship of the line of the Royal Navy, built at Chatham Dockyard to the dimensions of the 1719 Establishment, and launched on 2 June 1733.

The Tilbury was part of Vice-Admiral Edward Vernon's fleet and took part in the expedition to Cartagena de Indias during the War of Jenkins' Ear.

Tilbury was accidentally burnt in 1742.
