= 24 pounder =

A 24-pounder is a gun firing a shot of 24 pounds weight, a mass of 11 kg.

Examples include:

- 24-pounder long gun, including various designs of artillery used during the Age of Sail
- M1841 24-pounder howitzer, used by the United States Army from 1841 to 1865
- A size of Dahlgren gun used during the American Civil War
