= Tierra Bomba Island =

Island in Colombia

Tierra Bomba
Native name: Isla Tierra Bomba
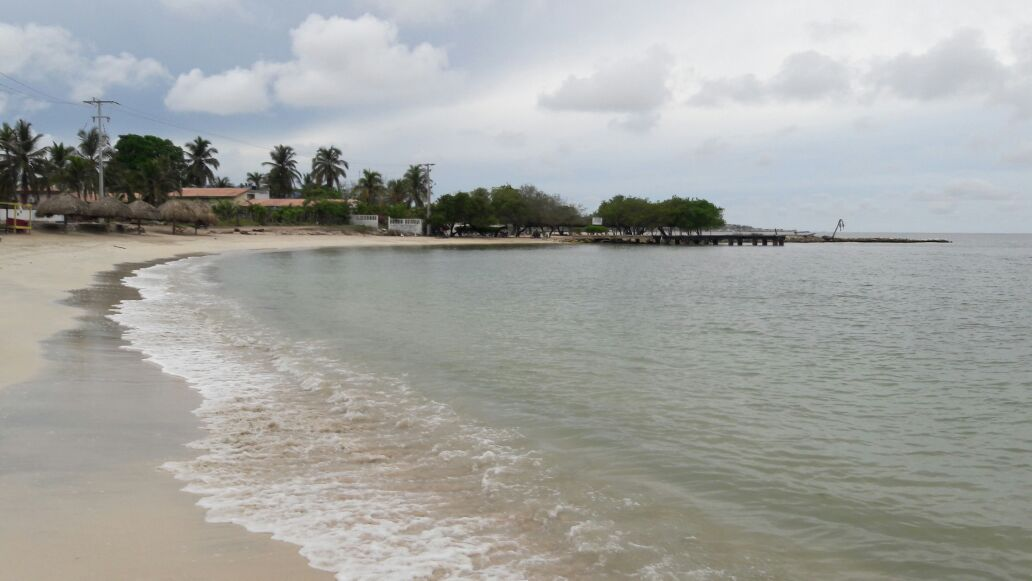

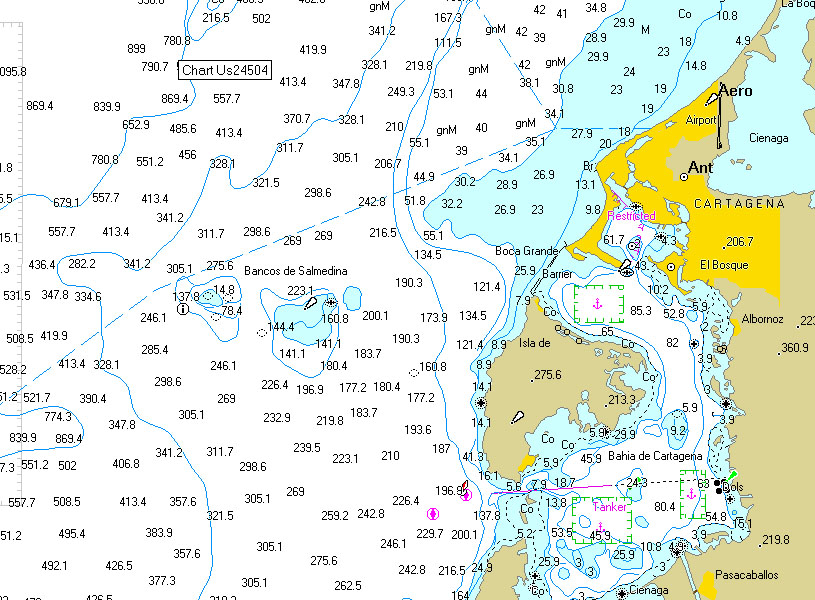

Geography
- Location: Caribbean Sea
- Coordinates: 10°21′N 75°34′W
- Area: 19.84 km^{2} (7.66 sq mi)
- Highest elevation: 20 m (70 ft)

Administration
- Colombia
- Department: Bolívar

Demographics
- Population: ~9,000 (2011)

Additional information
- Time zone: UTC−05:00

Tierra Bomba is a Colombian island off the coast of Cartagena de Indias. The island is within the legal administration of the municipality of Cartagena (City) in Bolívar Department, and covers a surface area of 19.84 km^{2} (1984.99 hectares) that house an estimated population of 9,000 people.

== Naval Base ==
In January 2014, it was announced that Tierra Bomba Island would house a new Caribbean Naval Base of the Colombian Navy. The naval base would be within the locality of Bocagrande and be 33.4 hectares in size.

== See also ==
- Caribbean region of Colombia
