= Raid on Cartagena de Indias (1697) =

French attack during the War of the Grand Alliance

Coordinates: 10.4114°N 75.5350°W

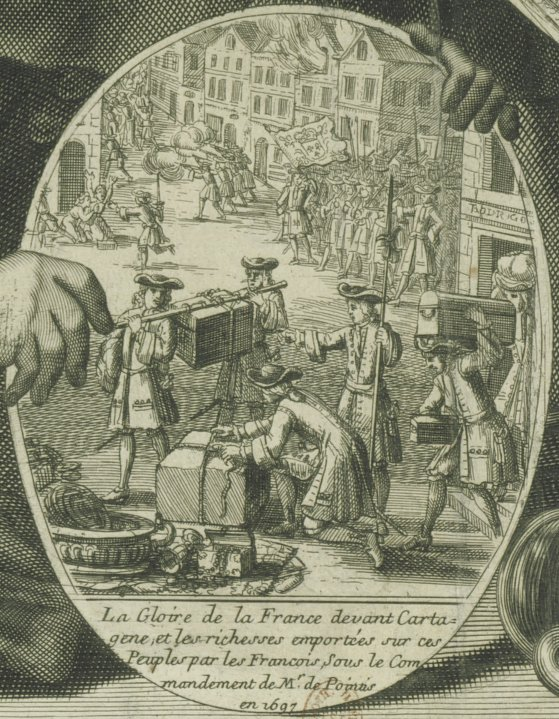
Illustration of Pointis' 1697 raid on Cartagena de Indias by Pierre Landry.

The raid on Cartagena de Indias was a successful attack by the French on the fortified city of Cartagena de Indias, on 6 May 1697, as part of the War of the Grand Alliance.

== Background ==
By 1695, the French Navy had declined to the point that it could no longer face the English and Dutch in an open sea battle and therefore had switched to privateering – guerre de course. Bernard Desjean, Baron de Pointis, active in the Caribbean from the beginning of the war, was able to convince King Louis XIV of France to let him try a daring attack on the richest city of the region, Cartagena, in present-day Colombia.

== Raid ==
He received command of a fleet of seven capital ships, three frigates, and some smaller vessels. The squadron left from Brest, France, on 7 January 1697, and arrived at Saint-Domingue in the West Indies on 3 March. Pointis requested assistance from governor Jean du Casse, who gave his support only reluctantly, as he preferred an attack on Portobelo. One month later, a fleet with 1,200 soldiers and 650 buccaneers appeared before Cartagena.

The renowned Spanish defences were not what they had once been, and Pointis captured both fortresses which defended Cartagena relatively easily, losing only sixty men. Between 6 May and 24 May 1697 the French plundered the city, accumulating loot valued at ten to twenty million livres.

Pointis then set sail directly for France, cheating his buccaneer allies of their promised share of the loot. Outraged, the buccaneers returned and plundered the city once more, this time not tempered by Pointis, committing rape, extortion and murder.

== Aftermath ==
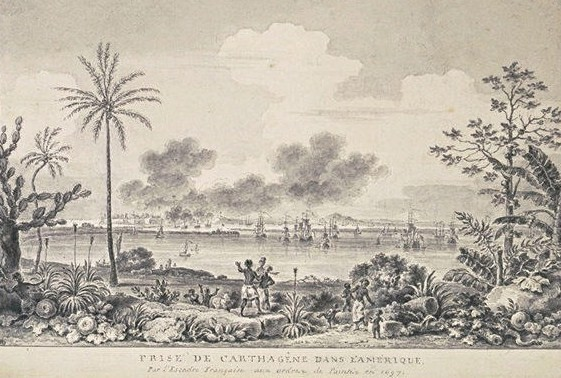
Cartagena under the control of the French; illustration by Nicolas Ozanne

On his return voyage to France, Pointis managed to avoid the English admiral John Nevell, whose squadron had been diverted from Cádiz, Spain, to pursue the French privateer. After a three-day chase, Nevell had captured only one ship. Unfortunately for him, this was a hospital ship infested with yellow fever, which now spread through the English and Dutch fleets. The disease killed 1,300 English sailors, six captains, and Admiral Nevell himself; only one captain in the Dutch squadron survived.

The French did not escape unscathed, as yellow fever spread through their fleet, too, killing hundreds of sailors. However, Pointis made it back to France and gave Louis XIV his share of two million livres. The rest of the loot made Pointis an immensely rich man.

He published Relation de l'expédition de Carthagène faite par les François en 1697 in Amsterdam the next year.

== See also ==
- Sancho Jimeno de Orozco
