= Bernard Desjean, Baron de Pointis =

French Navy officer (1645–1707)

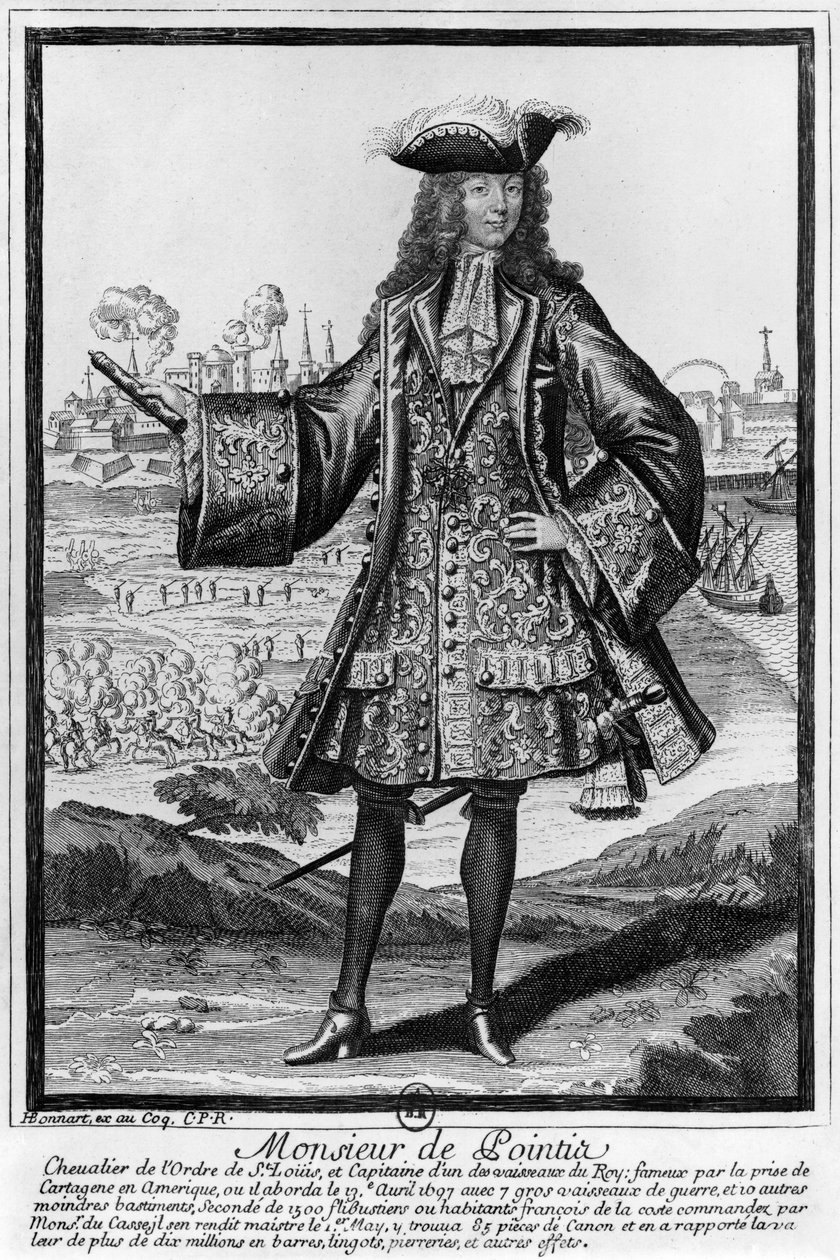
Engraved portrait of de Pointis

Bernard Desjean, Baron de Pointis (7 October 1645 – 24 April 1707) was a French Navy officer.

== Life ==
Pointis was born in Brittany. He took part in naval operations in the 1680s under Duquesne, such as the bombardment of Algiers and the punitive action against Genoa. In the 1690s, he fought under Tourville among others in the Battle of Beachy Head (1690). In 1693, he became chef d'escadre. In 1697, he undertook the Raid on Cartagena. This raid was so successful that it made him immensely rich and much appreciated by King Louis XIV.

In 1689, he was Lieutenant-General of the artillery at the siege of Derry. In 1702, following the death of Jean Bart, he was appointed head of the Dunkirkers, but was soon replaced by Marc-Antoine de Saint-Pol Hécourt due to his lack of initiative. In 1705, he attempted an attack on Gibraltar by sea during the Twelfth Siege of Gibraltar, but was defeated by John Leake in the Battle of Cabrita Point. After this battle, Pointis retired from active service. He published Relation de l'expédition de Carthègene faite par les François en 1697. He died in Paris in 1707.
