= Justly Watson =

British military engineer (d. 1757)

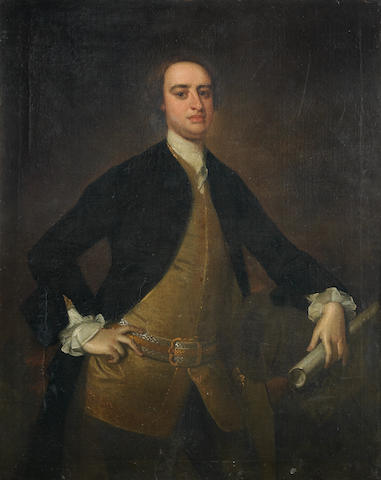
- Portrait from the Circle of Dandridge
- Born: c. 1710
- Died: 1757 (aged c. 47)
- Military career
- Allegiance: Great Britain
- Service: British Army; Royal Engineers
- Service years: 1726–1757
- Rank: Lieutenant-colonel
- Conflicts: Anglo-Spanish War; Siege of Gibraltar; War of Jenkins' Ear; Battle of Carthagena; Invasion of Cuba; War of the Austrian Succession; Siege of L'Orient

Justly Watson (c. 1710–1757) was an English army officer and military engineer in the British Army, rising to the rank of lieutenant-colonel in the Royal Engineers. He served beside his father Jonas Watson, an officer in the Royal Artillery, at the Siege of Gibraltar in 1727. He joined the Royal Engineers in 1732, served at Carthagena, and in the futile attempt on Cuba, in 1741, and the attack on Panama in 1742. He was stationed at Jamaica from 1742 to 1744, surveyed Darien and Florida in 1743, and served in the descent on Brittany in 1746. He was appointed chief engineer in the Medway Division in 1748, and reported on the West African stations from 1755 to 1756. He was stationed in Nova Scotia and Newfoundland in 1757, and died there, probably from coffee poisoned by a black female domestic.

== Origins ==
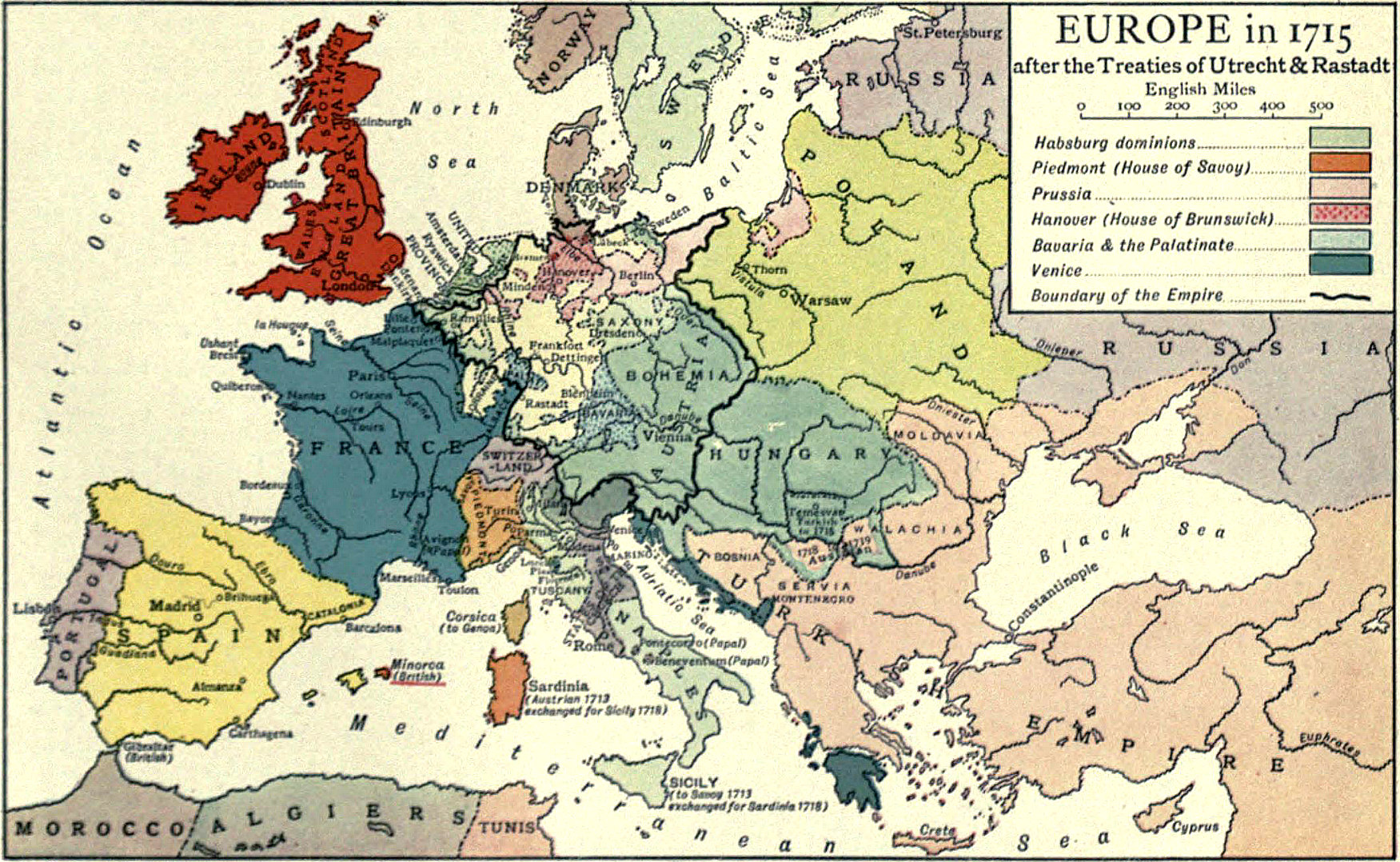
Europe in 1715

Justly Watson was the son of Colonel Jonas Watson, by his wife Miriam (bapt. 1686, died 1754), daughter of John and Anne West. Jonas Watson (1663–1741), served over fifty years in the Royal Artillery, and after distinguishing himself, first in the campaigns of William III in Ireland and in Flanders, and then in those of Marlborough, succeeded to the command of the artillery of the train. He was promoted lieutenant-colonel on 17 March 1727, and commanded the artillery at the Siege of Gibraltar in that year. He was employed in the command of the artillery on several expeditions until he was killed at the Siege of Carthagena on 30 March 1741. He bequeathed his books, maps, and "instruments relating to the affairs of artillery" to his son. He left a widow, Miriam, and a family of children. His widow was granted a pension of 40l. per annum in acknowledgment of her husband's services.

== Life ==
Justly Watson was born about 1710. He entered the ordnance train as a cadet gunner about 1726, and served during the Siege of Gibraltar in 1727 under his father, who commanded the ordnance train there. On 13 June 1732 he received a warrant as practitioner-engineer, and was promoted to be sub-engineer on 1 November 1734. He received a commission as ensign in Harrison's Foot on 3 February 1740, and in June was appointed to the ordnance train of the conjoint expedition, under Lord Cathcart and Sir Chaloner Ogle, to join Vice-admiral Vernon in the West Indies. He spent some months in the Isle of Wight in instructing the men of the train. He sailed on 26 October and arrived at Jamaica on 9 January 1741.

=== Carthagena ===
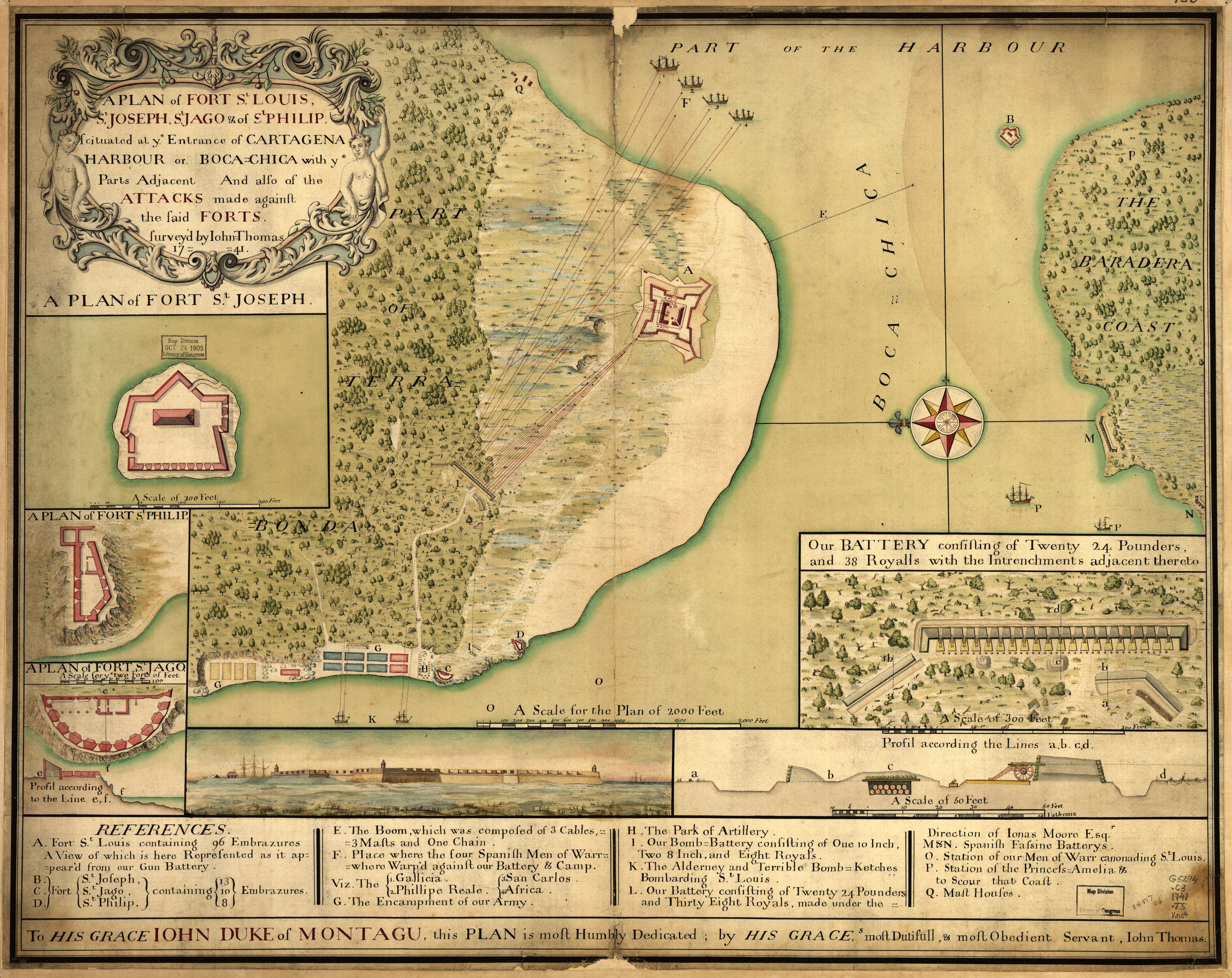
Forts in Carthagena Harbour, 1741

Watson accompanied the expedition under General Wentworth, who had succeeded to the command on Cathcart's death, to Carthagena in South America, Jonas Moore being chief engineer. He took part in the operations from 9 March to 16 April 1741. At the siege and assault on 25 March of Fort St. Louis, he accompanied the successful storming column. Once the troops had fairly occupied the fort, orders were given to destroy the boom across the mouth of Boca-Chica harbour, the end of which had been covered by the work; then the British fleet was able to enter the port. Watson was also present at the attack on other works in the harbour, and at the assault of Fort Lazar, the citadel of the town, where on the morning of 9 April a column of twelve hundred men led by General Guise found themselves opposite the very strongest front of the fort, with ladders too short to attempt the escalade. The attempt was a complete failure, and after a loss of 600 men killed and wounded, they were forced to retire. Watson, who at the time held only an ensign's commission in the army, so greatly distinguished himself in the siege that the General gave him a lieutenant's commission as a reward for his gallantry. This was recorded under date, "Head-quarters, La Quinta, April 10th, 1741", and named him "Lieutenant in Major-General Harrison's Regiment of Foot".

=== Jamaica, Cuba, Florida ===
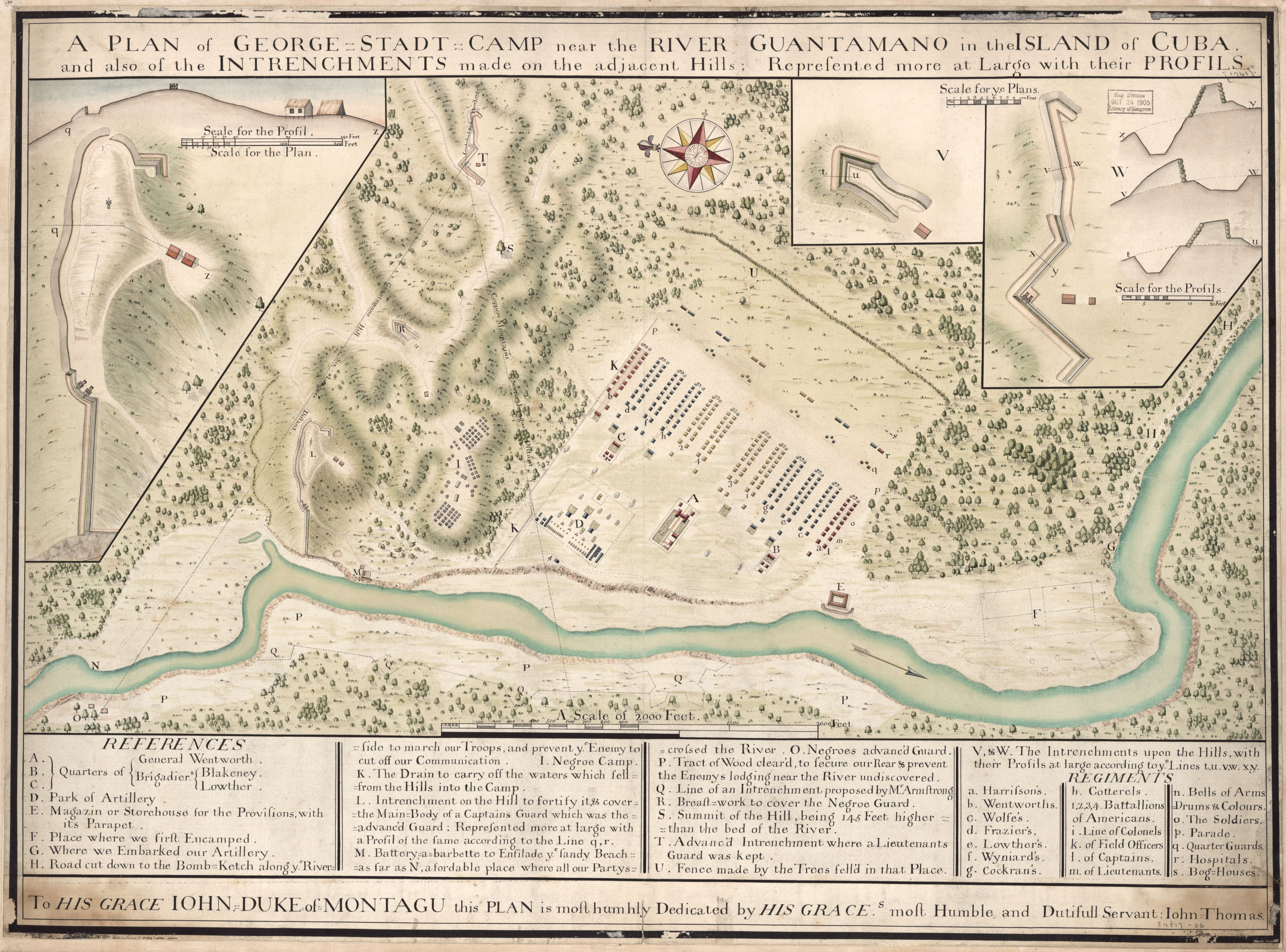
The British in Cuba, 1741

Watson returned to Jamaica on 19 May 1741. He was promoted to be engineer-extraordinary on 11 August, when he was serving in the expedition to Cuba. He returned to Jamaica in November. In March 1742 he sailed from Jamaica in the abortive expedition, under Vernon and Wentworth, to attack Panama, landing at Portobello. Watson made a plan of the town, harbour, and fortifications of Portobello, which is in the King's Library in the British Museum. On his return to Jamaica, and the recall of the expedition to England in September, he took charge of the works at Jamaica as chief engineer there, and his plans of Charles Fort and the Port Royal peninsula are in the archives of the war office.

In 1743 he visited Darien and Florida, under special orders, and made surveys and reports as to their defence. His plan of the harbour of Darien and adjacent country on the Isthmus, where Paterson's Scottish company settled in 1698, and his survey in two sheets of the coast from Fort William, near St. Juan River, to Mosquito River, with a plan of the town of St. Augustine, are in the British Museum. Watson returned to Jamaica, and was promoted to be engineer in ordinary on 8 March 1744. He sent to the board of ordnance a plan of Port Royal with its fortifications. He went back to England in the autumn of 1744, and was promoted to be captain-lieutenant in Harrison's Foot on 24 December 1745.

=== L'Orient ===
On 30 April 1746 Watson joined the conjoint expedition under Admiral Richard Lestock and Lieutenant-general St. Clair for North America. This was intended to be an expeditionary force, which on its arrival in America should be joined by colonial troops, to be raised for the purpose, but the mobilisation was delayed, and it was decided that the season was too late for the operation to be undertaken during that year. So that the extensive preparations should not be wasted, it was determined to make a descent on the coast of Brittany instead, and attack L'Orient, the port where all the ships and stores of the French East India Company were assembled.

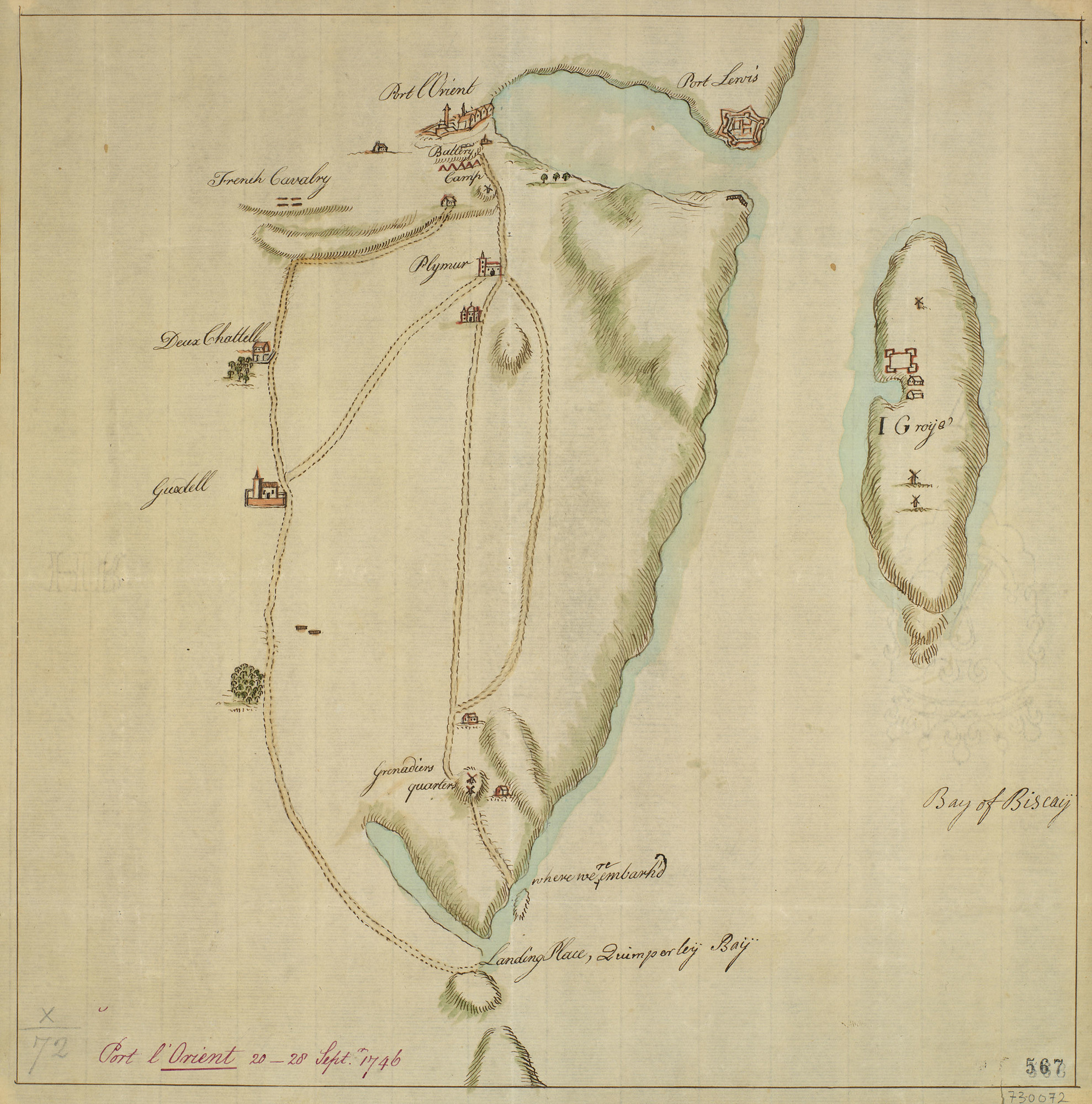
L'Orient, 20–28 September 1746

The fleet left Plymouth on 14 September 1746, and five days later the troops disembarked at Quimperley Bay, 10 mi (16 km) from L'Orient, and were marched in two columns to the point of attack. St. Clair sent Thomas Armstrong and Justly Watson to reconnoitre the town, and they reported that the place was only defended by a thin loopholed wall without any ditch. They added that they had chosen a site for a battery, from whence they could either make a breach or burn the town in twenty-four hours. In the early morning of the 22nd, St. Clair made his own reconnaissance, accompanied by Armstrong and Watson, who repeated their earlier views. A council of war was held on board the Princessa, the flagship of Admiral Lestock, at which the two engineers and Captain Chalmers, of the artillery, were present. These three officers being of one mind, it was decided to make the attempt, and the orders were given. The result proved that they were in error in their views. Without a proper strength of artillery, and with insufficient ammunition and stores, they fired away almost all their shot without causing any real damage to the works. Several councils were held, and after much disputation it was ultimately decided that the engineers had made a wrong calculation, that the men were greatly fatigued, and that the prospects of success were not good enough to continue. The siege was therefore abandoned on 27 September, and on the next day the men were re-embarked.

According to Whitworth Porter, "There is no doubt that the failure of this attack reflected much discredit on both Armstrong and Watson, who seem to have considerably underrated the strength of the place and its powers of resistance." Watson was also present at the attack on Quiberon and the capture of forts Houat and Heydie, and returned to England with the expedition.

=== England ===
Watson was promoted on 2 January 1748 to be sub-director of engineers, and appointed chief engineer in the Medway Division, which included Gravesend and Tilbury, Sheerness, Harwich, and Landguard forts. There is a plan in the War Office drawn by Watson, dated 1752, showing the cliff and town of Harwich and the encroachments of the sea since 1709; and another, dated 1754, of a proposed breakwater at Harwich Cliff; also a plan of Sheerness and its surrounds, indicating the boundaries of public lands.

=== North America, West Africa ===
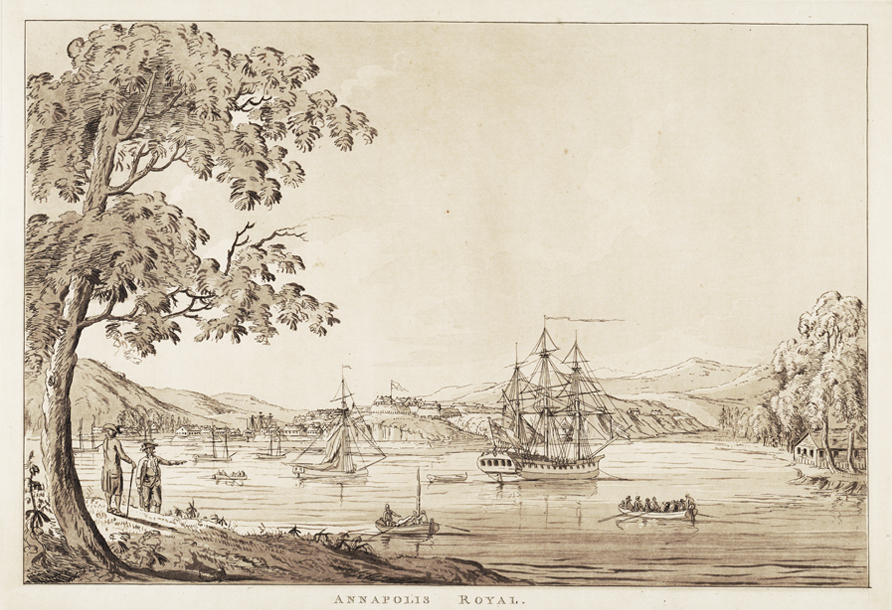
Annapolis Royal, 1781

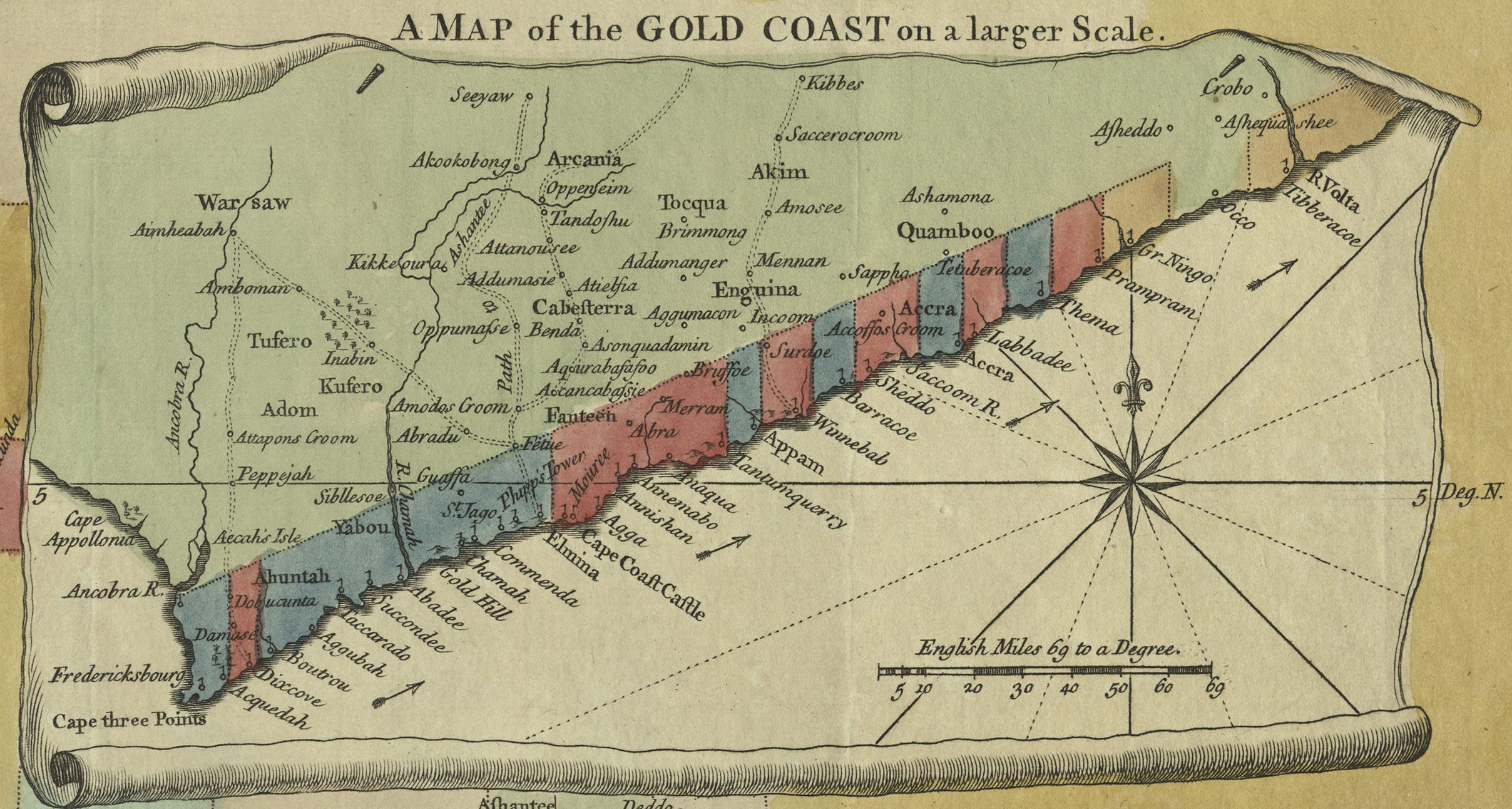
The Gold Coast, 1750

On 17 December 1754 he was promoted to be director of engineers, and was sent to Annapolis Royal as chief engineer of Nova Scotia and of the settlements in Newfoundland. His did not stay long in North America, as he was specially selected for service on the west coast of Africa, where he arrived before December 1755.

Justly Watson, James Bramham and John Apperly were the first Royal Engineers ever sent into that part of the world. An address to the King had been carried in the House of Commons on the defenceless state of the British possessions on the west coast of Africa, and the three engineers had been directed, by resolution of the House of Commons passed on 22 April 1755, to inspect the fort at Annamaboe and the other British stations on the coast. Watson visited the military stations along the Gold Coast at Whydah, James's Island, Accra, Prampram, Tantumquerry, Winnebah, Annamaboe, Secondee, Dixcove, and Cape Coast Castle. The two senior officers (Watson and Bramham) returned to England in the summer of 1756, but Apperly stayed on the Coast for some years superintending the construction of new works at Annamaboe. Watson's reports and plans were approved and the House of Commons voted money to carry out his proposals.

In October and November 1756 Watson examined Rye Harbour and reported on the measures necessary to improve it. At the end of 1756 he was sent to Annapolis Royal to resume his appointment and duties as chief engineer in Nova Scotia and Newfoundland. On 14 May 1757 he was commissioned, on the reorganisation of the engineers, as lieutenant-colonel of Royal Engineers. He died suddenly at St. John's, Newfoundland, in the summer of 1757 from the effects of poison administered in his coffee, it was believed, by a black female servant.

== Personal life ==
Watson married, on 15 November 1733, Susan Curtis, at Pagham, Sussex. His will was proved by her, and as his widow she was granted a pension of 40l. a year from 1 January 1758 in consideration of her husband's services. His daughter Miriam (died 1782) married Watson's sometime assistant Sir William Green.

== Gallery ==
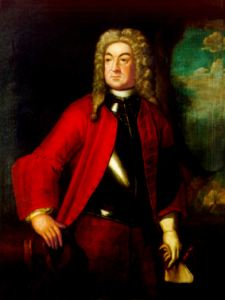
Possibly the portrait of Jonas Watson in half-armour, c. 1730.

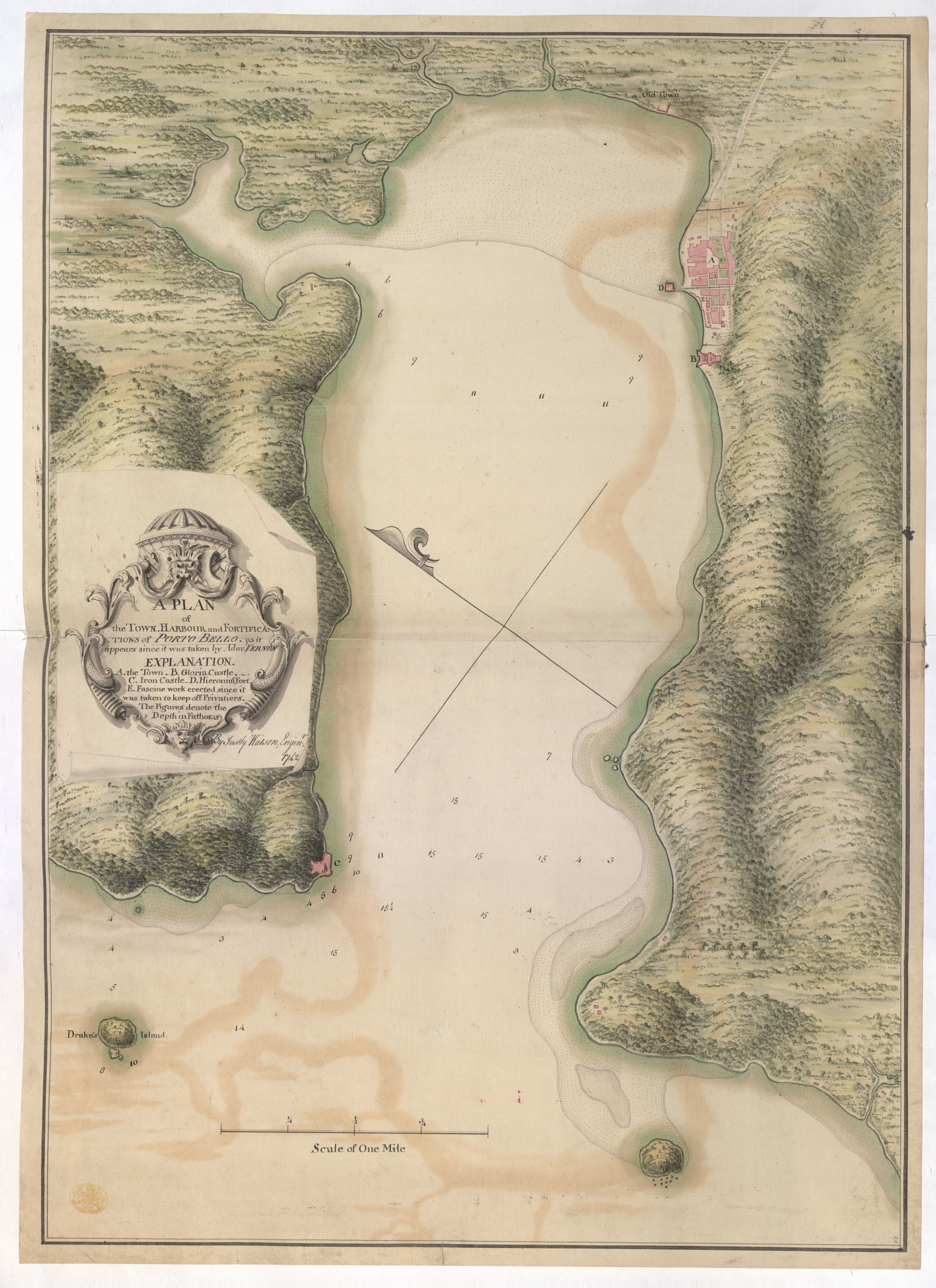
A Plan of the Town, Harbour and Fortifications of Porto Bello, 1742.

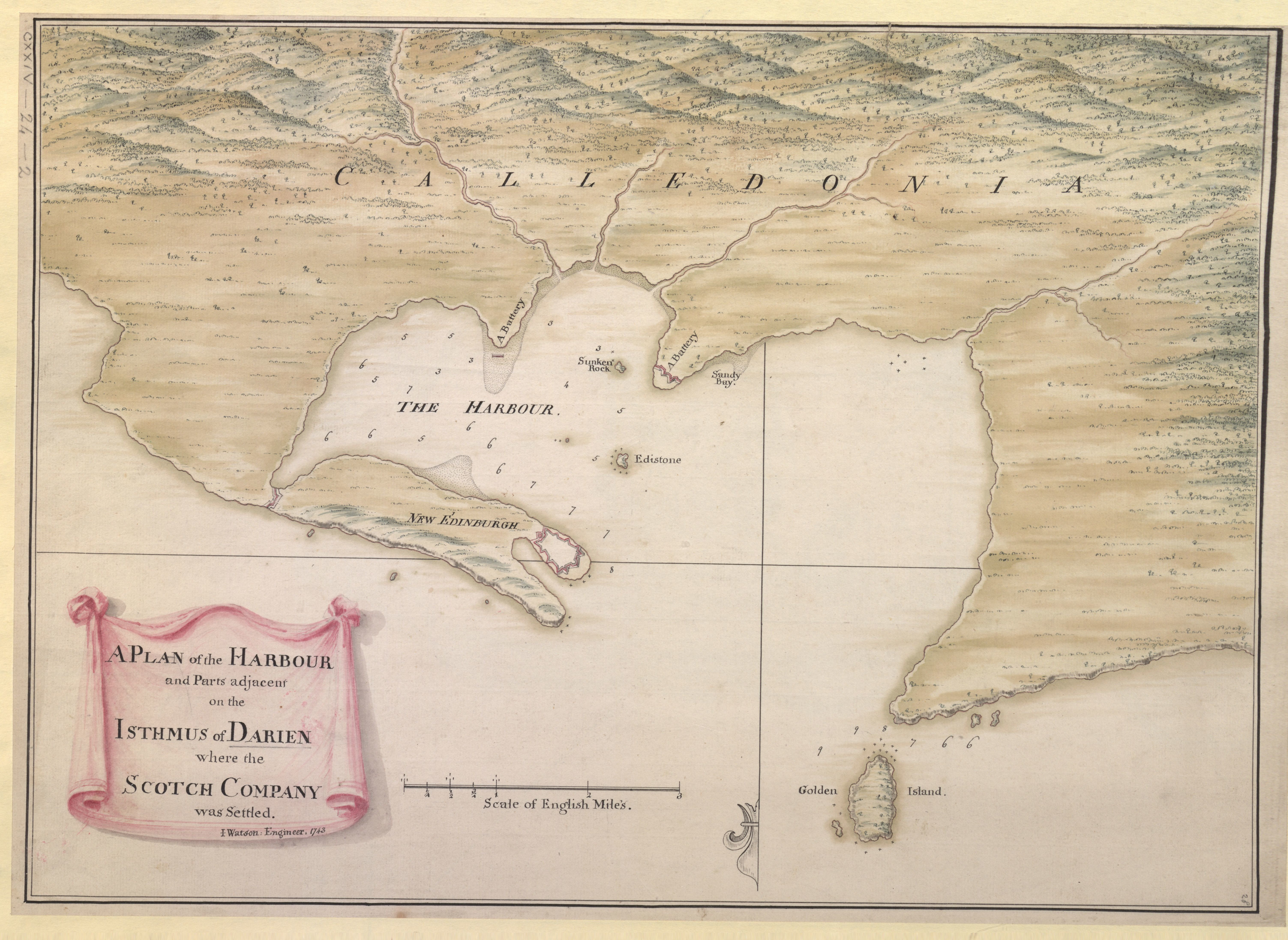
A Plan of the Harbour and Parts adjacent on the Isthmus of Darien where the Scotch Company was settled, 1743.

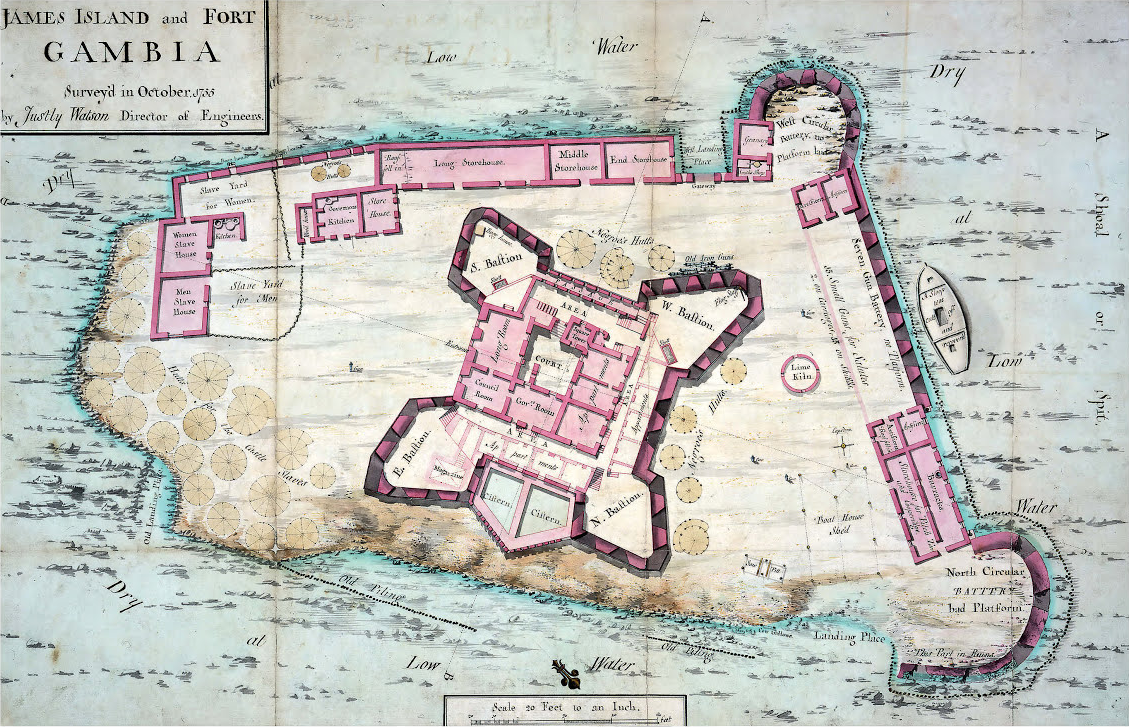
James Island and Fort Gambia, 1755.

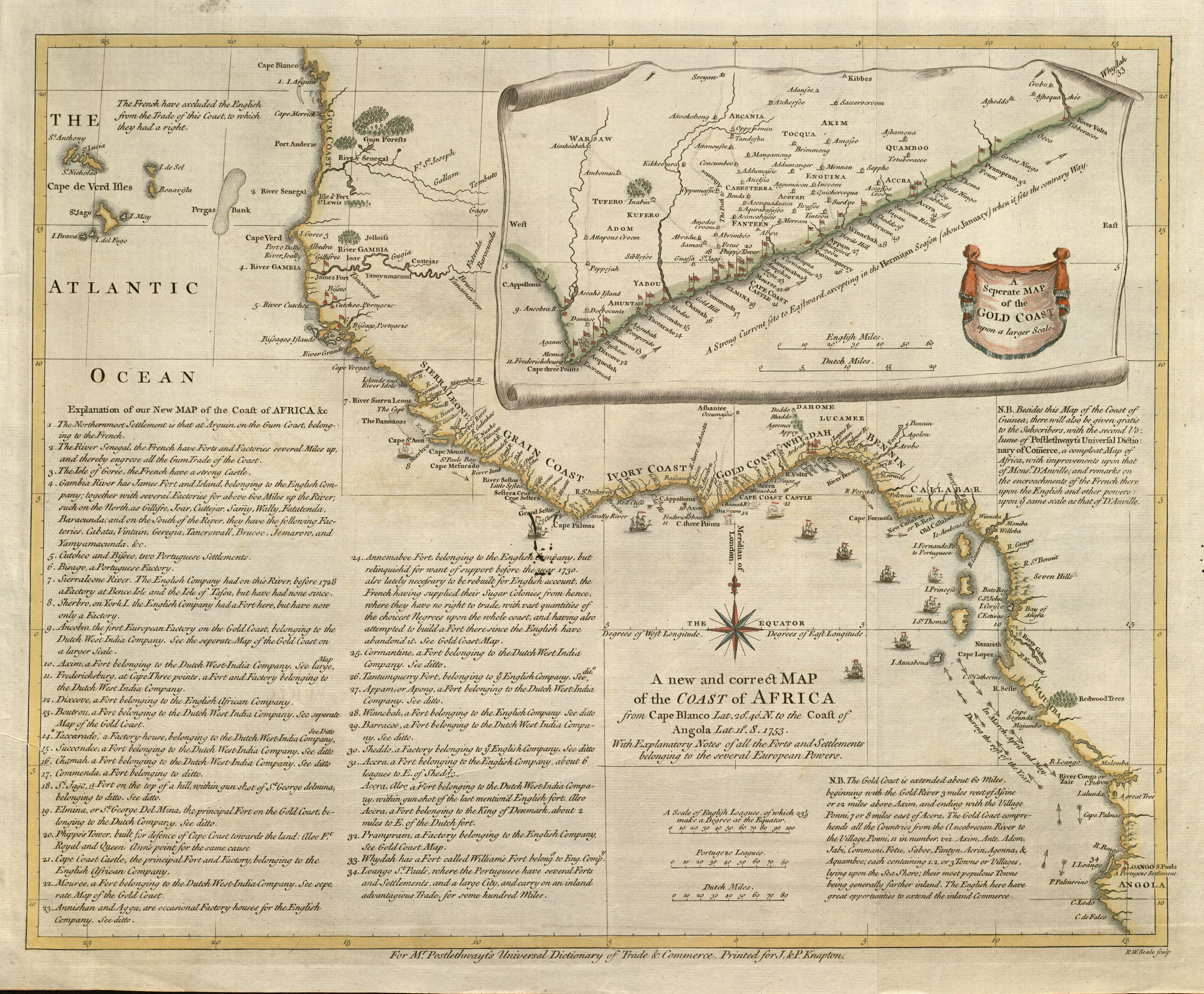
Map of the Coast of Africa from Cape Blanco to the Coast of Angola, 1753

== See also ==
- Royal African Company
- African Company of Merchants

== Sources ==
- Connolly, T. W. J.; Edwards, R. F., eds. (1898). Roll of Officers of the Corps of Royal Engineers from 1660 to 1898. Chatham: W. & J. Mackay & Co., Limited. pp. 3, 6.
- Cust, Edward (1862). Annals of the Wars of the Eighteenth Century. Vol. 2. London: John Murray. p. 112.
- Kane, J.; Askwith, W. H., eds. (1900). List of Officers of the Royal Regiment of Artillery from the Year 1716 to the Year 1899. 4th ed. London: William Clowes and Sons, Limited. pp. 219, 227.
- Porter, Whitworth (1889). History of the Corps of Royal Engineers. Vol. 1. London: Longmans, Green, and Co. pp. 73, 151–154, 156, 161, 174, 180.
- Vetch, R. H.; Handley, Stuart (2008). "Watson, Justly (c. 1710–1757), military engineer". Oxford Dictionary of National Biography (online ed.). Oxford University Press. doi:10.1093/ref:odnb/28852. (Subscription, Wikipedia Library access or UK public library membership required.)

Attribution:

- This article incorporates text from a publication now in the public domain: Vetch, Robert Hamilton (1899). "Watson, Justly". In Lee, Sidney (ed.). Dictionary of National Biography. Vol. 60. London: Smith, Elder & Co. pp. 19–20.
