= Jonas Moore (disambiguation) =

Sir Jonas Moore (1617–1679) was an English mathematician and engineer. Other notable men of that name include:

- Jonas Moore (died 1682), an English surveyor; son of Sir Jonas Moore
- Jonas Moore (officer) (c. 1691–1741), an English military engineer; possible grandson of Sir Jonas Moore
