= Jonas Moore (officer) =

English military engineer (c. 1691–1741)

- Born: c. 1691
- Died: 1741 (aged ~50)
- Military career
- Allegiance: Great Britain
- Service: British Army: Royal Engineers
- Service years: 1709–1741
- Rank: Captain
- Conflicts: Anglo-Spanish War; Siege of Gibraltar (WIA); War of Jenkins' Ear; Siege of Fort St. Louis (DOW)

Jonas Moore (c. 1691–1741) was an English army officer and military engineer in the British Army. Commissioned as probationer engineer in 1709, he was appointed sub-engineer at Gibraltar in 1711, chief engineer and commander-in-chief of the train of artillery at Gibraltar in 1720, and sub-director of engineers in 1722. He was distinguished at the Siege of Gibraltar in 1727. He was appointed chief engineer of the British expedition to Spanish America in 1740, and was mortally wounded in the attack on Carthagena.

== Life ==
Jonas Moore, probably grandson of Sir Jonas Moore the mathematician, received his commission as probationer engineer in October 1709. On 1 January 1711 he was appointed sub-engineer at Gibraltar and attached to David Colyear, 1st Earl of Portmore, the governor, for special service. According to Vetch, he was later sent to Port Mahon, Minorca, where he remained for some years, only returning to Gibraltar in August 1720. However, Paul Latcham thinks this is a mistake probably resulting from confusion with one James Moore, who was engineer on Minorca from around 1715.

On 18 November 1720 Moore was appointed chief engineer and commissioned as commander-in-chief of the train of artillery at Gibraltar. He was warranted sub-director of engineers at the end of 1722. He received several letters from the board of ordnance conveying their good opinion of his ability and economy, and in one, dated 22 January 1727, he was informed that his care not to exceed the estimates has been noticed by the master-general and board, and "gains much their esteem".

Moore was chief engineer at Gibraltar during the siege by the Spaniards in 1727. The trenches were opened on 11 February, and the siege was not raised until 23 June. At some point during the siege Moore was injured. The Spaniards lost many men, but owing to the excellent cover provided by Moore, who went over to Morocco and visited Tetuan to secure supplies of fascines and brushwood, the British loss was comparatively small. On 19 March 1728 he was given the local rank of director of engineers. He remained at Gibraltar until 1740, and in October of that year was appointed chief engineer with the joint expedition which sailed from Spithead under Rear-admiral Sir Chaloner Ogle and General Lord Cathcart for Spanish America. On arrival at Dominica Lord Cathcart died, and was succeeded in command by General Wentworth, whom Vetch calls an incompetent officer. Ogle proceeded to Jamaica, where he joined Vice-admiral Vernon. After many conflicting schemes it was resolved to attack Carthagena, a strongly fortified place, well garrisoned and ably commanded.

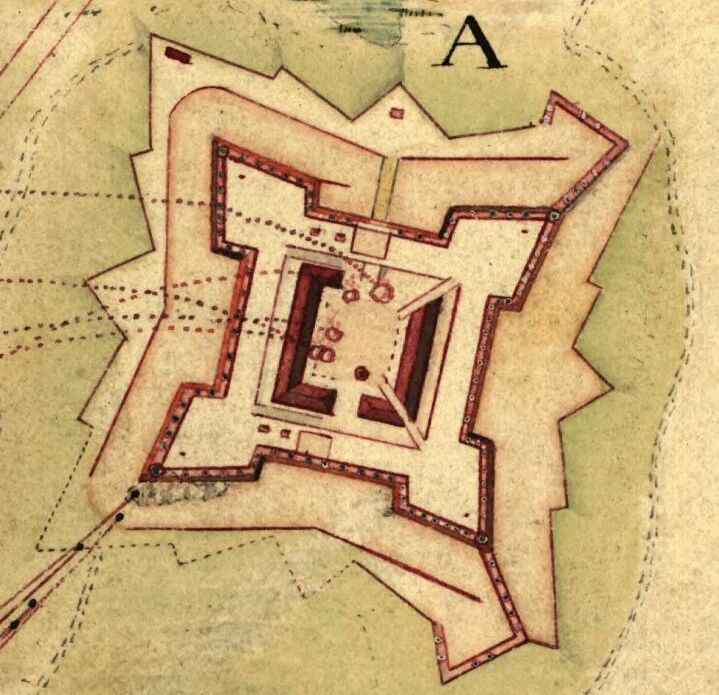
Plan of Fort St. Louis (crop)

Moore erected his batteries on the shore on 9 March 1741, and soon made a breach in Fort St. Louis, a work which mounted eighty-two guns and defended the mouth of the harbour. Moore was, however, struck on the 22nd by a fragment of a shell, and died the following day. His death was a serious blow to the enterprise. According to Vetch, the incompetence of the general led to disaster which might have been avoided had the chief engineer survived. As it was, the land forces were re-embarked, and the expedition sailed back to Jamaica. Moore carried a dormant commission by order of the Duke of Montagu, dated 24 July 1740, to command the artillery in the event of the death of the two senior officers of that corps. He never married and seems to have died intestate.

== Legacy ==
In 1894 there were, apparently, in the War Office twenty plans and sections of Gibraltar and various works of defence in that fortress skilfully drawn by Moore. These have not been located since, and nor have upwards of twenty cartographical works by Moore listed in the ordnance office map room catalogue. Two of Moore's plans are now in the British Library.

== Gallery ==
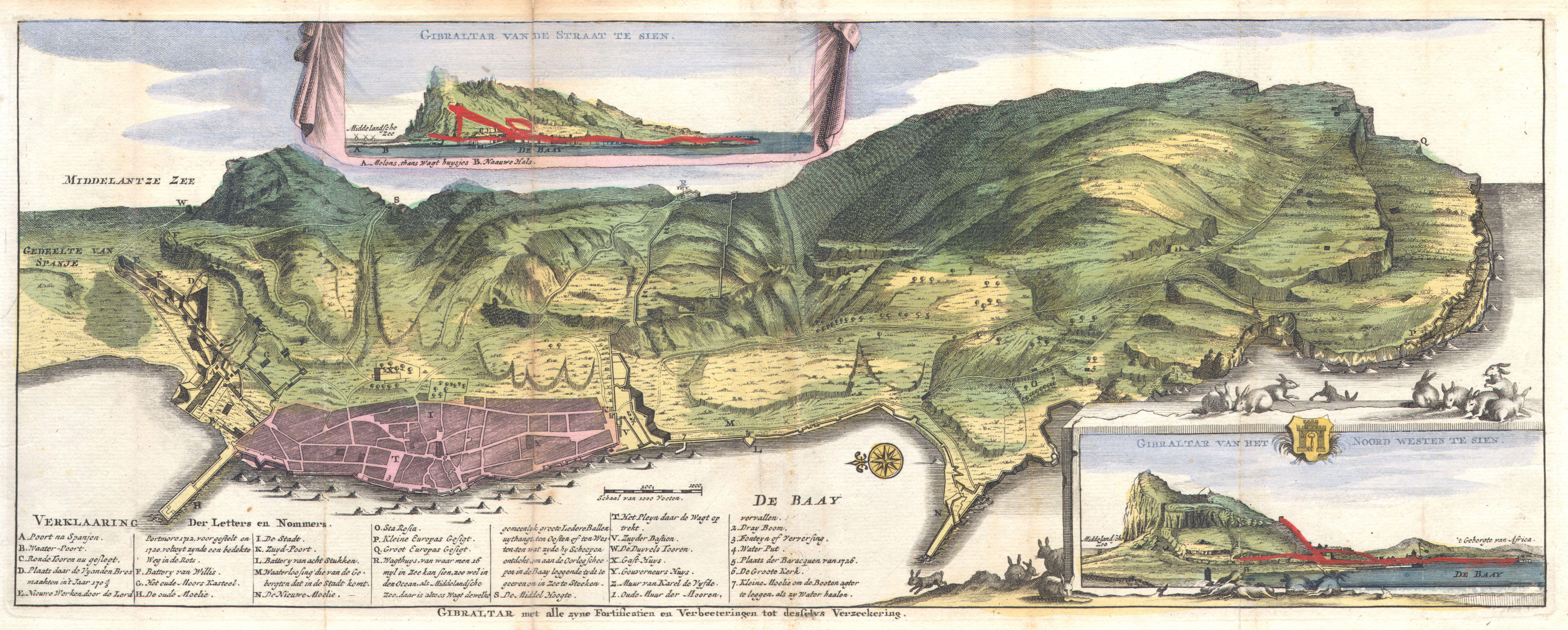
French Map of Gibraltar, 1720

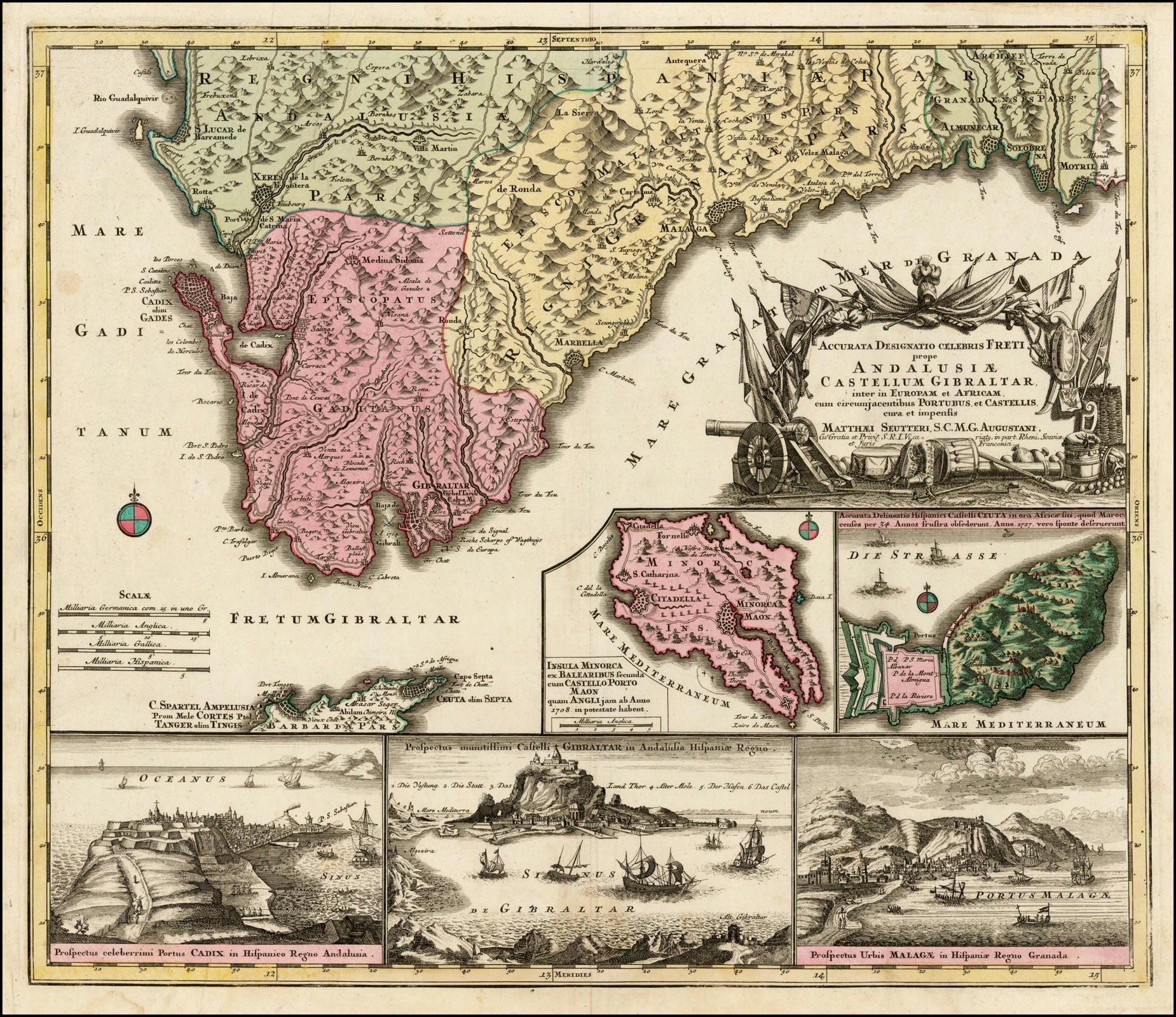
Map of Andalusia and Gibraltar, 1730

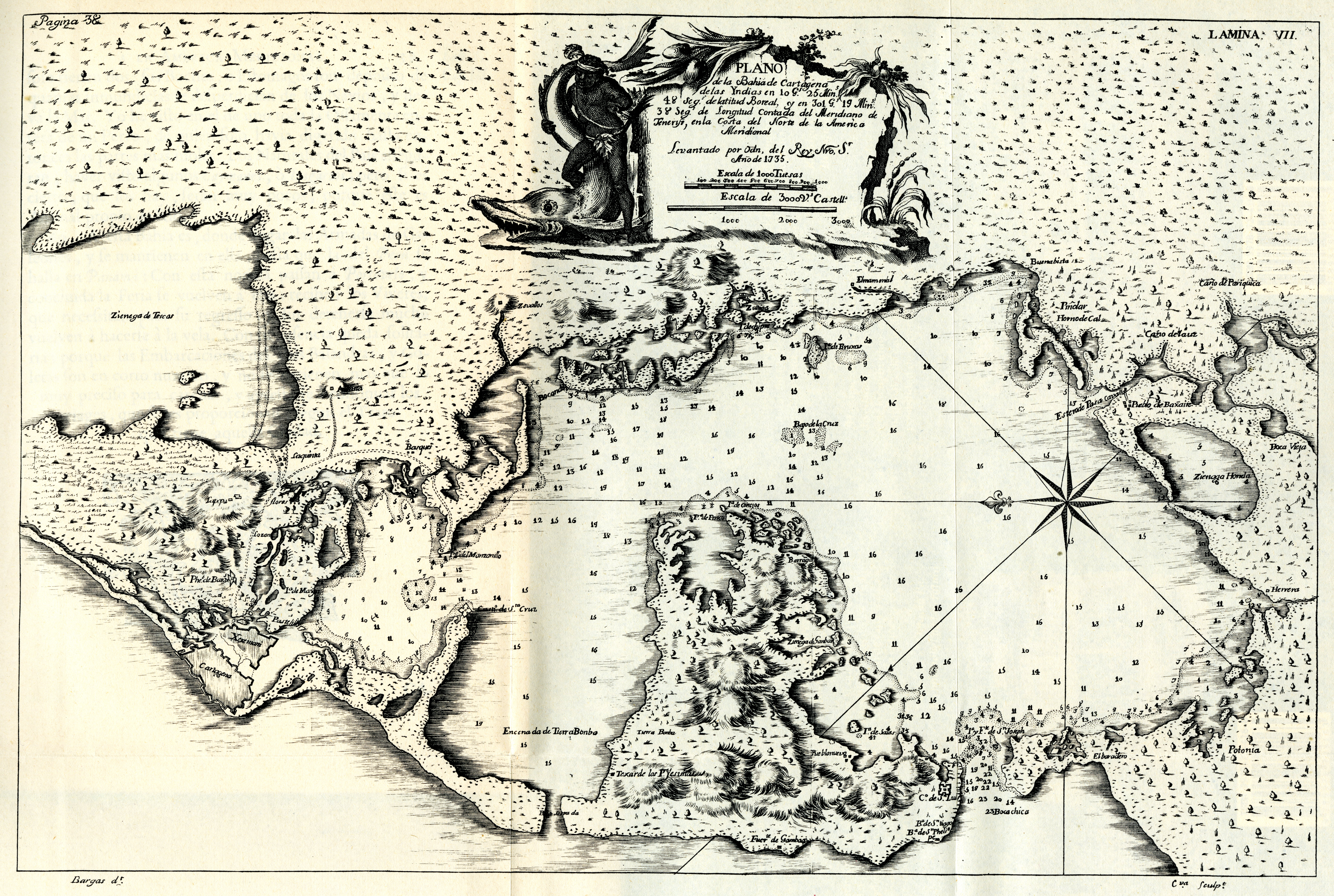
Spanish Plan of Cartagena, 1735

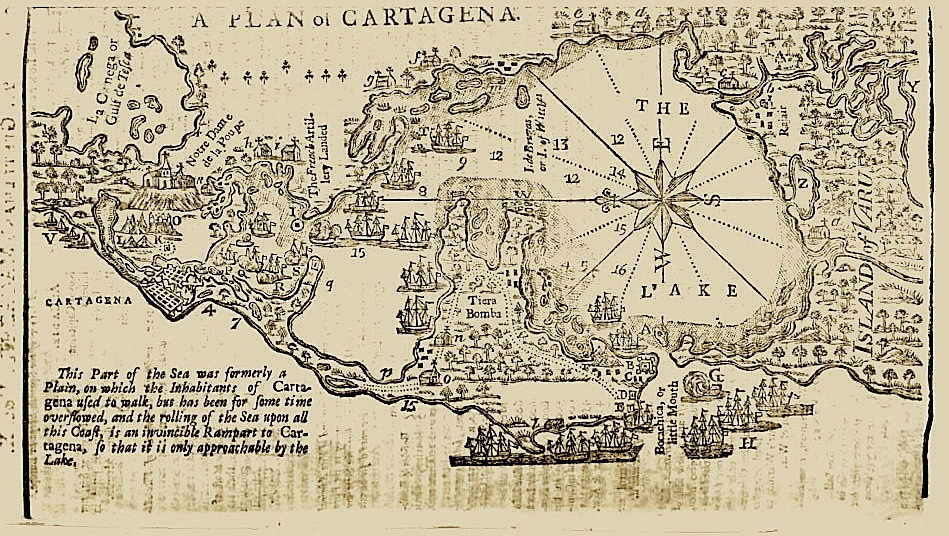
English Plan of Cartagena, 1740

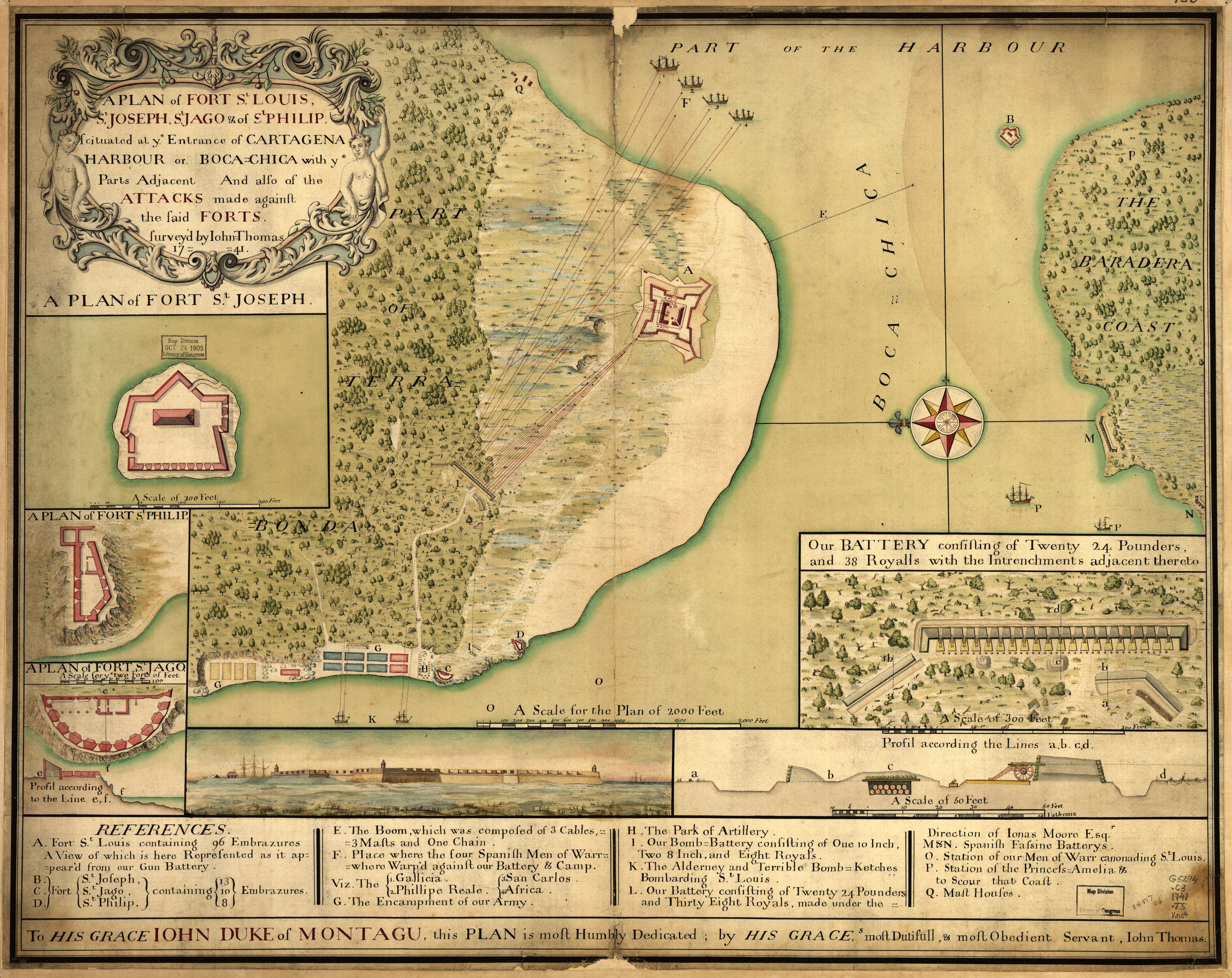
Plan of Forts in the Entrance of Cartagena Harbour, 1741

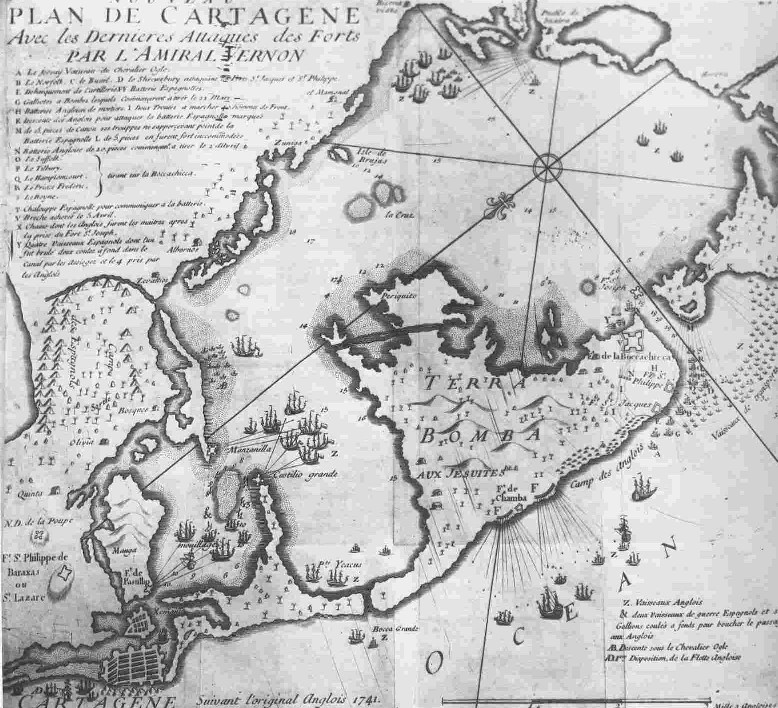
Plan of Cartagena with the Attacks on the Forts by Admiral Vernon, 1741

== Sources ==
- Latcham, Paul (2016). "Moore, Jonas (d. 1741), military engineer". Oxford Dictionary of National Biography (online ed.). Oxford University Press. doi:10.1093/ref:odnb/19138. (Subscription, Wikipedia Library access or UK public library membership required.)

Attribution:

- This article incorporates text from a publication now in the public domain: Vetch, Robert Hamilton (1894). "Moore, Jonas (1691?-1741)". In Lee, Sidney (ed.). Dictionary of National Biography. Vol. 38. London: Smith, Elder & Co. pp. 374–375.
