= Polycarpus Taylor =

British Royal Navy officer

Rear-Admiral Polycarpus Taylor
- Born: 1706 or 1707
- Died: 23 January 1781 (aged 73-75); Norton, County Durham
- Burial place: St Mary the Virgin, Norton
- Military career
- Allegiance: Kingdom of Great Britain
- Branch: Royal Navy
- Service years: c.1733–1762
- Rank: Rear-Admiral
- Commands: HMS Basilisk; HMS Fowey; HMS Fowey; HMS Warwick; HMS Elizabeth; HMS Cornwall; HMS Rippon; Jamaica Station; HMS Culloden; HMS Deptford
- Conflicts: War of the Austrian Succession; War of Jenkins' Ear; Battle of Cartagena de Indias; Invasion of Cuba; Vernon's Expedition on Panama; Battle of Saint-Louis-du-Sud; Battle of Santiago de Cuba; Battle of Havana; King George's War; Seven Years' War

Rear-Admiral Polycarpus Taylor (born 1706 or 1707; died 23 January 1781) was a Royal Navy officer of the eighteenth century, most notable for his service commanding ships in the West Indies during the War of the Austrian Succession. Having joined the Royal Navy some time before 1733, Taylor then served at the Battle of Cartagena de Indias and Invasion of Cuba before being promoted to commander in 1742. After commanding several vessels and being promoted to post-captain, in August 1744 Taylor took command of HMS Fowey; serving in the English Channel he ran ashore and destroyed the French privateer Griffon in 1745.

Taylor joined the Jamaica Station in 1747, and at the start of 1748 was appointed to command HMS Elizabeth. In this ship he led the successful attack at the Battle of Saint-Louis-du-Sud and was also present at the Battle of Santiago de Cuba, after which he was translated into Rear-Admiral Charles Knowles' flagship HMS Cornwall. Taylor commanded Cornwall at the controversial Battle of Havana, and when Knowles returned home to be court martialled Taylor was left as senior officer in Jamaica, commanding HMS Rippon. Recalled to England in 1749, Taylor received his next commands, HMS Culloden and HMS Deptford, in 1756. After serving in them in the Mediterranean Fleet he left Deptford in early 1758 and had no further active service. He was made a superannuated rear-admiral in 1762, retiring to live in Norton, County Durham.

== Naval career ==
=== Initial service ===
Polycarpus (Note: Also spelt "Policarpus".) Taylor was born in 1706 or 1707; nothing else is recorded about his family or upbringing. Having at some point joined the Royal Navy, Taylor became lieutenant of the 8-gun sloop HMS Wolf on 4 May 1733. Wolf was serving on the Jamaica Station, based at Port Royal. The ship had been heavily hit by fevers, and routinely cycled through commanding officers; in September 1735 Taylor had to apply directly to the Admiralty for his wages because his most recent captain had died before being able to sign off on them.

Taylor continued in Wolf, including when she was paid off in August 1735. He finally left the ship on 10 April 1738 as she was being recommissioned. After around a year without a position, Taylor was appointed to serve as second lieutenant of the 60-gun ship of the line HMS Augusta on 21 June 1739. (Note: Syrett and DiNardo record this as the date of Taylor's promotion to commander.) From 11 July Augusta served off Cape St Vincent, forming part of Rear-Admiral Nicholas Haddock's Mediterranean Fleet. The ship was under the command of Captain Chaloner Ogle, who was promoted to rear-admiral but continued with Augusta as his flagship.

In the summer of 1740 Augusta moved to serve in Admiral Sir John Norris' Channel Fleet. On 10 September Ogle was sent with a large squadron to escort an expeditionary force to the West Indies, sent there to reinforce Vice-Admiral Edward Vernon on the Jamaica Station. Taylor moved from Augusta to the 80-gun ship of the line HMS Russell, part of the same squadron, as her first lieutenant on 3 October. They reached the West Indies Station on 23 October, with Russell serving as Ogle's new flagship.

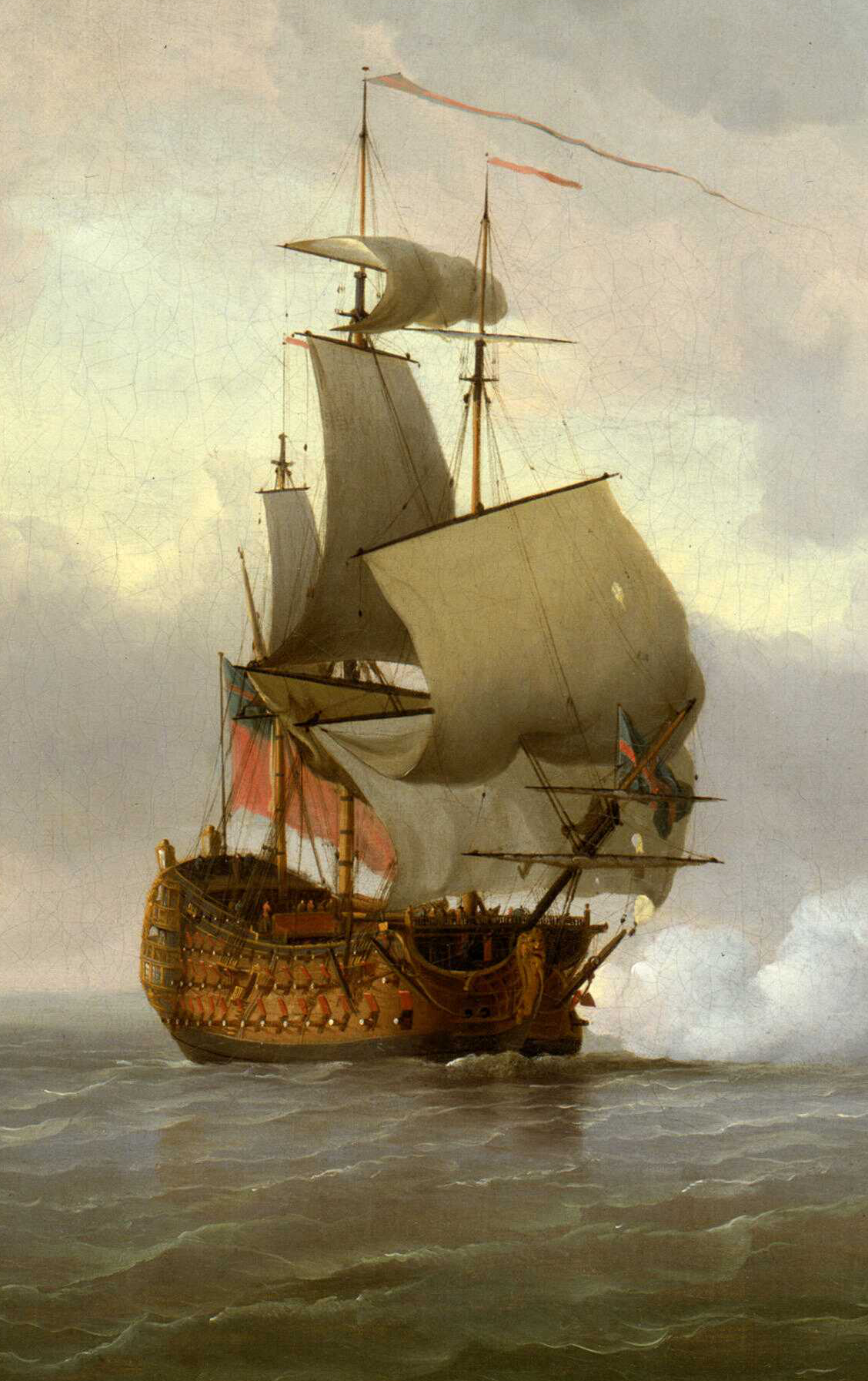
HMS Russell, in which Taylor fought at the Battle of Cartagena de Indias

As part of Russell's crew, Taylor participated in the unsuccessful attack on Cartagena at the Battle of Cartagena de Indias between March and April the following year. Then on 19 June Vernon moved Taylor to serve on board his flagship, the 80-gun ship of the line HMS Boyne, as her fourth lieutenant.

=== First commands ===
Boyne participated in the unsuccessful Invasion of Cuba between July and October. Taylor became her third lieutenant on 6 October, and first lieutenant on 6 February 1742. The ship was present during operations at Porto Bello in March, but after this further offensives were halted because the British fleet had been considerably weakened. Taylor was promoted to commander in around August of the same year, and was given command of the 8-gun bomb vessel HMS Basilisk. He commanded the bomb until 2 May 1743 when he was promoted to post-captain and appointed to command the 44-gun frigate HMS Fowey.

Taylor sailed home in Fowey in June 1744, escorting a convoy. It was expected at the time that news of war with France would soon reach the West Indies, and to ensure that the convoy was not reported to French authorities and attacked, the French Martinique-based merchant ship Mentor was forced to sail with the convoy. Part way through the journey the British privateer Thurloe, which knew that war had been declared, came up with the convoy and declared that she had captured Mentor. An argument then ensued over whether Thurloe had legitimately captured the ship or if Fowey had already taken her into custody. Taylor appealed Thurloe's capture of behalf of his crew at a prize court in 1750.

The Admiralty had previously ordered that a new ship be built in the place of Fowey, and accordingly Taylor paid her off upon reaching England with his convoy. Taylor transferred to the new ship, also a 44-gun frigate named HMS Fowey, in August 1744. In 1745 the new Fowey was sent to cruise in the English Channel. On 12 June Taylor was sailing off Cape Antifer when the French 24-gun Saint Malo privateer Griffon attempted to chase him, being ignorant of Fowey's greater strength. When Griffon discovered her mistake, the ship ran from Fowey to the nearby Feschampe Bay. Taylor followed Griffon into the bay, forcing the French ship to take cover under a 4-gun shore battery.

Griffon and the battery fired at Fowey, and the French ship then made sail to reach a nearby pier. Both of her pilots had however been incapacitated by Fowey's return fire, and after an hour Taylor forced Griffon to run ashore without reaching her goal. The majority of the crew drowned, with Fowey rescuing around forty survivors. The French ship had lost her foremast and was bilged, with the guns spiked. Taylor sent boats in to burn Griffon, but 150 Frenchmen had garrisoned the wreck and they were unable to board it. Fowey took the French survivors to Spithead. In November Taylor's ship escorted a troop convoy to Louisbourg and was subsequently kept on station there under the governor, Commodore Charles Knowles. For 1746 Fowey spent the summer months patrolling off Virginia, and in the winter did similar work at Jamaica.

=== Jamaica Station ===
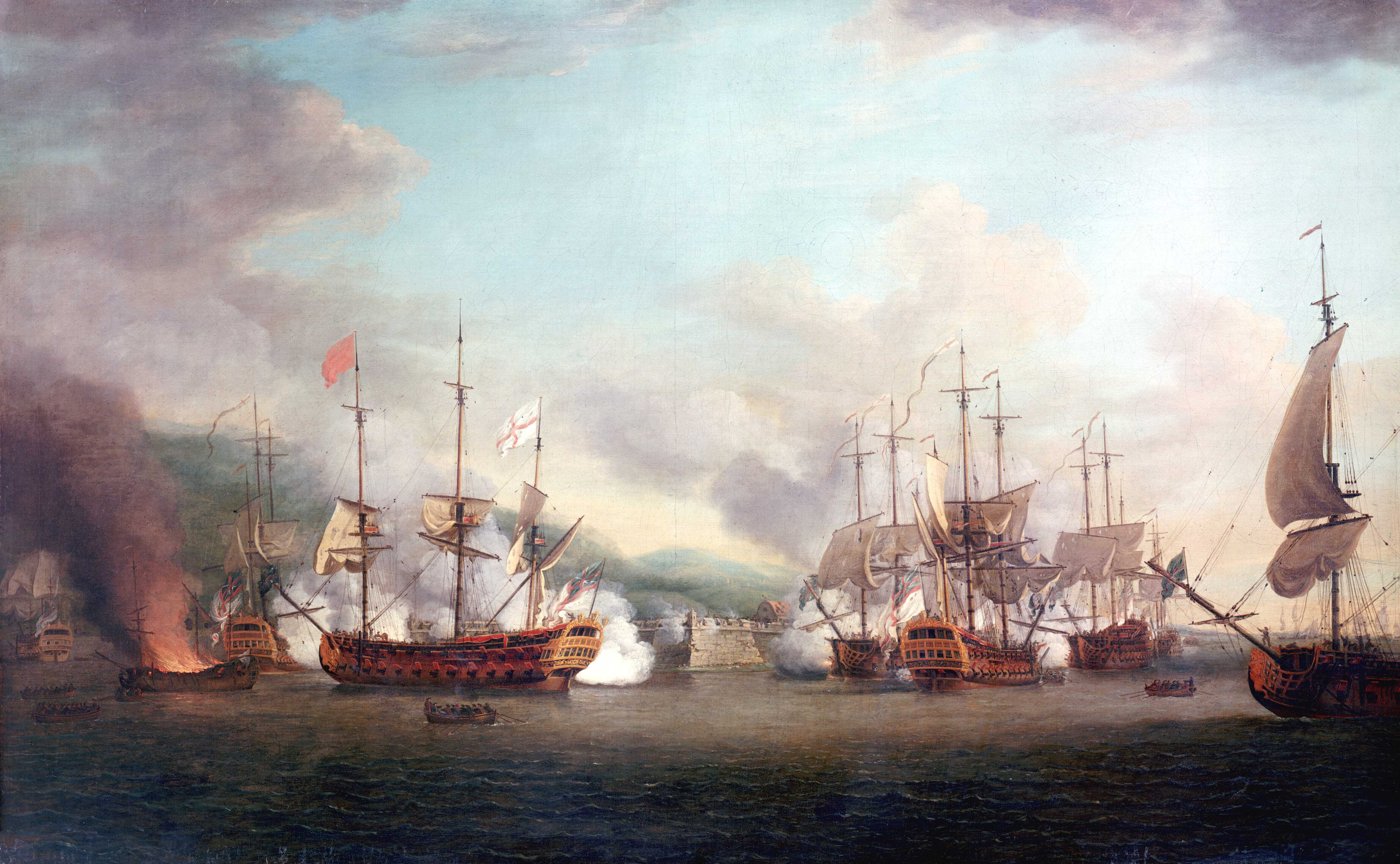
The Battle of Saint-Louis-du-Sud, in which Taylor commanded HMS Elizabeth

In January 1747 Fowey sailed with Knowles to formally join the Jamaica Station, with the latter being appointed commander-in-chief. On 1 February Taylor was part of a court martial board that dismissed Captain John Crookshanks from his command of the 44-gun frigate HMS Lark and cashiered him. Taylor left Fowey on 3 November, moving into the 60-gun ship of the line HMS Warwick which was on the same station. This was a brief appointment for Taylor, as the now Rear-Admiral Knowles translated him into the 64-gun ship of the line HMS Elizabeth on 29 January 1748.

Knowles' squadron sailed to the south coast of Cuba on 13 February, but contrary winds meant they instead first went to attack Port Louis, Hispaniola, at the Battle of Saint-Louis-du-Sud on 22 March. Led into the harbour by Elizabeth, the squadron cannonaded the Spanish 76-gun island castle protecting the area, which in response sent a fireship to attack Elizabeth and Knowles' flagship, the 80-gun ship of the line HMS Cornwall. Boats from the squadron towed the fireship away before it could inflict any damage, but Elizabeth pre-emptively cut her cables and warped out of danger. The other ships continued to bombard the castle, and the Spanish governor surrendered soon afterwards. With the winds back in their favour, in April the squadron moved to attack Santiago, but on 9 April the Battle of Santiago de Cuba ended in failure when the leading British ship was unable to breach a defensive boom spread across the entrance to the harbour. The squadron afterwards returned to Jamaica, and in June Knowles appointed Taylor to command Cornwall.

After a refit the squadron went to sail off Havana to intercept the Spanish treasure fleet in August. On 12 October Knowles encountered a squadron of Spanish warships, beginning the Battle of Havana. While the Spanish immediately formed line of battle, Knowles' force took longer to do so, and the battle only commenced at 2.30 p.m. after a chase of several hours, when the two fastest British ships came into range of the Spaniards. Cornwall reached the engagement at 4 p.m. and at pistol-range attacked the 70-gun ship of the line Africa, Vice-Admiral Andrés Reggio's flagship. Taylor's ship was heavily damaged in the exchange, losing her maintopmast. This forced Cornwall to leave the line of battle to begin repairs, but while these were being completed the Spanish 64-gun ship of the line Conquistador neared her having also fallen out of the line. Cornwall attacked Conquistador and set her on fire three times with coehorns, forcing the Spaniard to surrender. The rest of the Spanish squadron escaped. Africa had been heavily damaged in the fight, and anchored in a bay to make repairs before she could reach a friendly port; Knowles' squadron found her on 15 October, and the Spaniards burned the flagship to avoid capture.

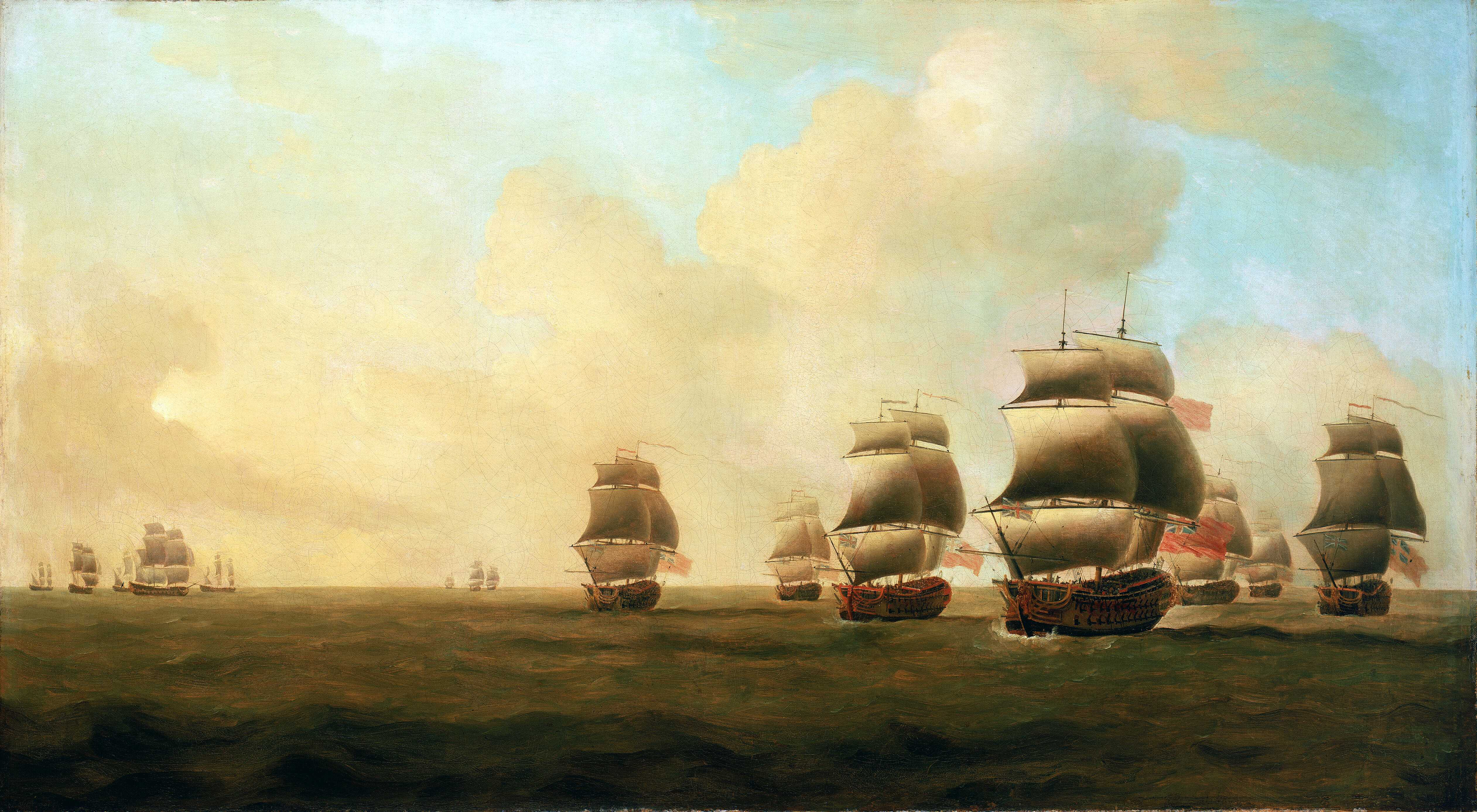
HMS Cornwall, commanded by Taylor, leads the British squadron at the beginning of the Battle of Havana

The squadron afterwards continued to patrol off Havana in the hope of discovering the treasure fleet, but on 16 October Knowles was informed that Britain and Spain were entering peace preliminaries to end the War of the Austrian Succession and War of Jenkins' Ear. After the battle Knowles reported the "bashfulness" of several of his captains to Admiral Lord Anson, but listed Taylor among those he thought were good seamen. Taylor had spent much of the battle in a small boat rowing the length of the British line of battle, ordering and threatening the captains of the other ships. On 29 October Knowles moved him to command the 60-gun ship of the line HMS Rippon. In the meantime Knowles' captains had sent their own complaints to Anson, arguing that he had stayed in Taylor's Cornwall when he could have moved into a faster ship, and had been slow to form line of battle.

With the war over, Knowles and most of the squadron returned to England towards the end of the year, where the admiral and four of his captains were court martialled. (Note: Taylor supported Knowles against the other captains, but did admit that the line of battle was "far from firm". The court martial reprimanded Knowles.) Rippon, however, stayed in the West Indies, and with Knowles' departure Taylor became the senior officer on the Jamaica Station. His period in command was brief, and he was recalled to England at the end of 1749.

=== Later service and retirement ===
Taylor reached Spithead in Rippon and paid the ship off on 12 December. He did not receive a new command until 7 June 1756, when he was appointed to the 74-gun ship of the line HMS Culloden at the start of the Seven Years' War. (Note: While John Knox Laughton records that Taylor took command of HMS Marlborough briefly before going to Culloden, Rif Winfield records that it was actually Captain Witteronge Taylor who went to Marlborough; Witteronge and Polycarpus are often confused in service histories because of their unusual names and because they both served under Knowles in the West Indies.) Culloden was part of the Mediterranean Fleet and based at Gibraltar, and to join her Taylor sailed out with Vice-Admiral Sir Edward Hawke, who had been one of Taylor's captains in Wolf and was assuming command of the fleet.

Having arrived at Gibraltar on 2 July, Hawke took the fleet to Minorca. This was to attempt to reverse the result of the Battle of Minorca where the island had been lost to the French, but Hawke was unable to facilitate this. Taylor relinquished his command of Culloden in favour of Captain Smith Callis in August, instead joining the 50-gun ship of the line HMS Deptford on 3 October. Deptford was also part of the Mediterranean Fleet, and Taylor continued with it until his ship returned home to undergo a refit at Chatham Dockyard from December 1757. On 25 January 1758, just before this was completed, Taylor left the ship.

This was Taylor's last active service in the Royal Navy. On 6 December 1762 he was made a superannuated rear-admiral, and in his retirement he continued to live at his home in Norton, County Durham. He died there on 23 January 1781, aged 74, and was buried at St Mary the Virgin, Norton.

== Personal life ==
While details on most of Taylor's family are unavailable, he had at least two children. A daughter, Mary, was born in around 1740 and went on to marry the naval officer Captain Robert Gregory, and was Taylor's eventual heir. On 20 July 1753 a son of his, also named Polycarpus, was baptized in Norton. Taylor then married Alice Gregory, also of Norton, on 13 December the same year at St. George's Chapel, Hyde Park Corner. In 1762 he had a large house built in Norton which went on to be known as "Admirals House" and is still extant.
