= Battle of Saint-Louis-du-Sud =

1748 battle of the War of the Austrian Succession

- Part of the War of the Austrian Succession
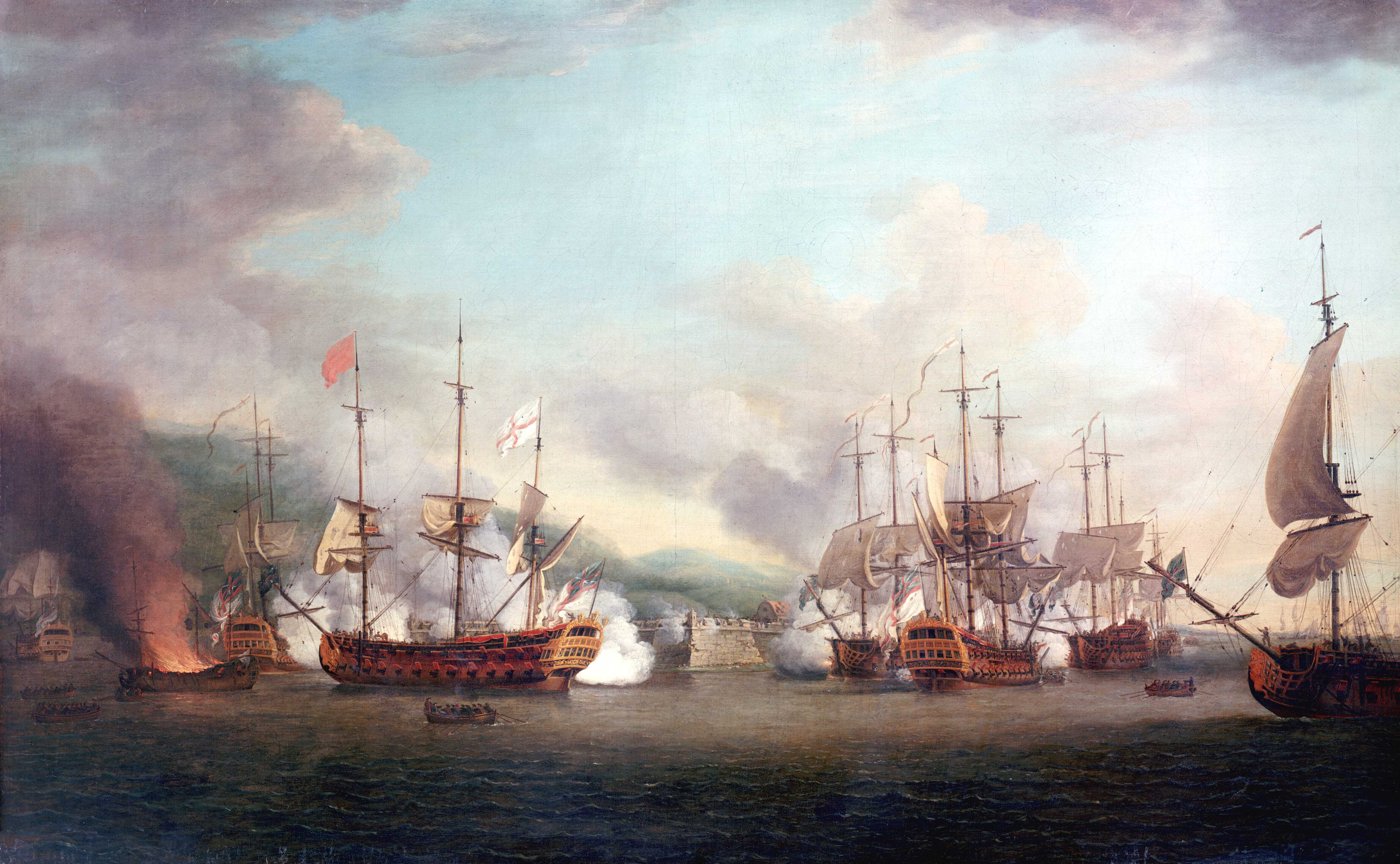
- Painting of the battle by Richard Paton
Date	22 March 1748
Location	Saint-Louis-du-Sud, Saint-Domingue
Result	British victory

Belligerents
Great Britain	France

Commanders and leaders
Charles Knowles	Étienne Cochard de Chastenoye

Strength
9 ships of the line 2 sloops	310 soldiers

Casualties and losses
20 killed 50 wounded	160 killed or wounded 150 captured 4 ships captured

The Battle of Saint-Louis-du-Sud (also known as the Battle of Port Louis) was fought on 22 March 1748 in the French colony of Saint-Domingue during the War of the Austrian Succession. A British Royal Navy squadron under the command of Admiral Charles Knowles attacked and destroyed a large French fort in Saint-Louis-du-Sud (English: Port Louis), then under the command of the interim Governor of Saint-Domingue, Étienne Cochard de Chastenoye.

== Battle ==
=== Background ===
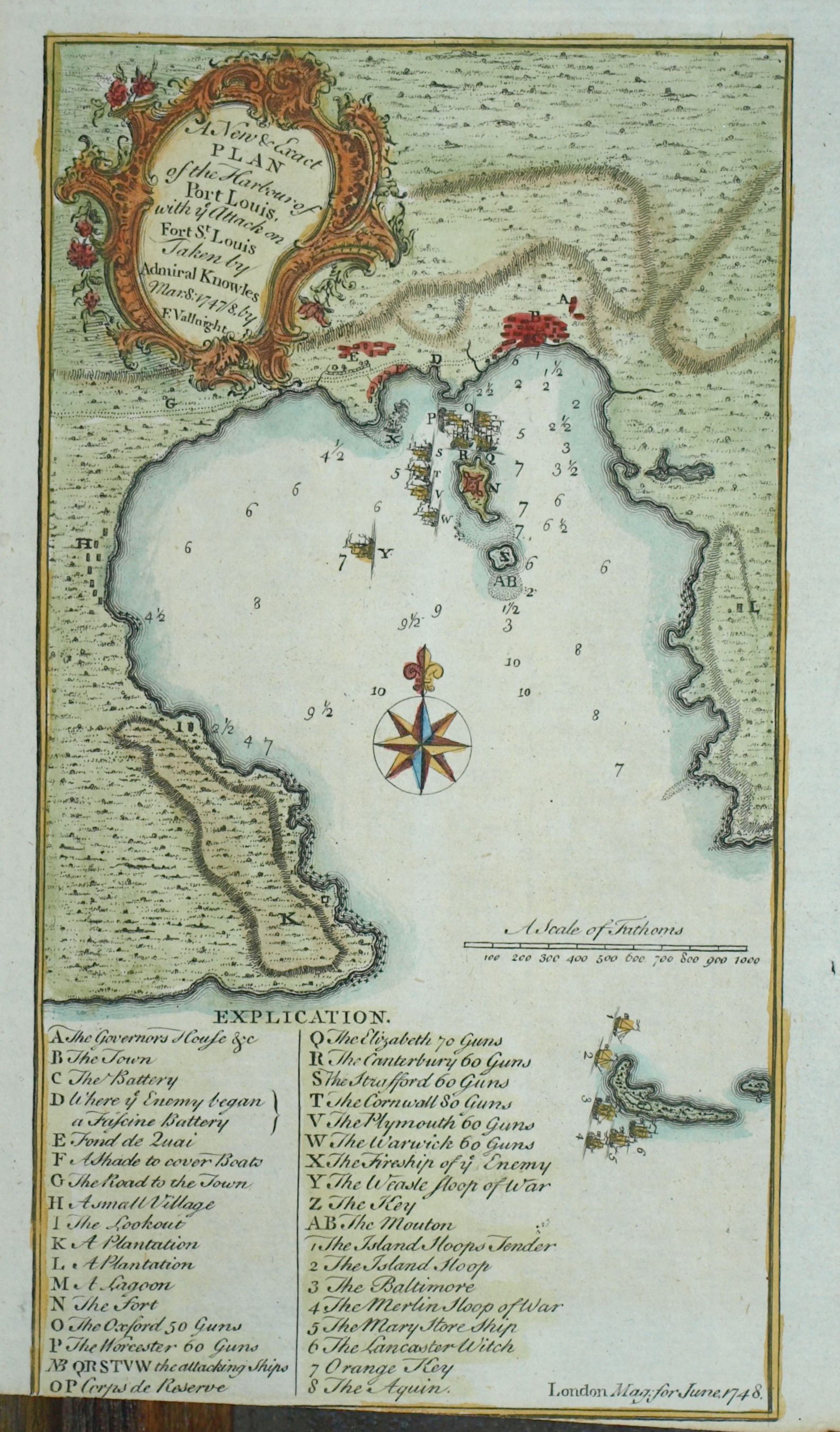
A plan of St. Louis de Sud 1748

Britain had been attacking the Spanish colonies in the War of Jenkins' Ear since 1739 but with only limited success. The War of Austrian Succession had spread to the Caribbean and French colonies soon became a target also and islands such as Guadeloupe, Martinique and Saint Domingue were under a close blockade by the Royal Navy. After Knowles finished his stint as governor of Louisbourg he was promoted to rear-admiral of the white on 15 July 1747, and appointed as commander in chief on the Jamaica station.

Knowles had initially intended to take his squadron and attack the Spanish at Santiago de Cuba, but contrary winds led to him deciding instead to attack the French Fort Saint Louis de Sud at Saint Domingue. Shortly before midday on 22 March 1748 in HMS Elizabeth Knowles's led his squadron into the harbor of Port Saint Louis, completely surprising its defenders. An imposing seventy eight gun island castle guarded the road stead, manned by 310 troops and a company of black gunners under Governor Étienne Cochard de Chastenoye behind a twenty four foot-high stone walls.

=== Action ===
The first French guns opened fire at 12:05 pm but Knowles's ships remained silent until all of them had anchored beneath the ramparts. As soon as this strategy was coming to form Knowles ordered his ships to open fire in a volley of broadsides at point blank range. A heated exchange ensued for the next three hours; the British ships pounding the French fort. The desperate defenders sent a fire-ship down from the inner roads, which compelled Elizabeth to cut her cable and warp out of danger.

The remaining Royal Navy ships however maintained a fierce pressure, so much so that the fort was starting to crumble and French counter fire was becoming slacker. Many guns and gun crews had been knocked out by British cannon fire and French casualties were heavy. Seeing the destruction that lay before him and British cannon fire not letting up, Chastenoye had no choice but to send out an officer out at 3:00 pm to suggest terms. Knowles made a counteroffer, and half an hour later the French commander accepted. The terms for the French were to surrender and that the fort would be occupied by the British without molestation.

=== Aftermath ===
The garrison had suffered 160 casualties in all, compared to nineteen killed and fifty wounded among the British warships. The French garrison under the terms surrendered, but were soon released and marched away to the safety of the nearest settlement but keeping their firearms and not to fight against any of the British forces for a year and a day.

British sailors and marines then occupied the fort and set about dismantling it. The British also seized four ships. Over the course of the week the castle was set for demolition and destroyed. Knowles stood away on 30 March and knowing with victory complete, then headed off again hoping to assault Santiago de Cuba. This time however he was repelled by the Spanish.

== Ships involved ==
Ship	Guns	Men	Commander	Notes	Ref.
HMS Cornwall	80	600	Rear-Admiral Charles Knowles; Captain Richard Chadwick		
HMS Plymouth	60	400	Captain Digby Dent		
HMS Elizabeth	70	480	Captain Polycarpus Taylor		
HMS Canterbury	60	400	Captain David Brodie		
HMS Strafford	60	400	Captain James Rentone		
HMS Warwick	60	400	Captain Thomas Innes		
HMS Worcester	60	400	Captain Thomas Andrews		
HMS Oxford	50	300	Captain Edmond Toll		
HMS Weazel	6	102	Commander Samuel Barrington		
HMS Merlin	6	100	Commander Thomas Foley		
