= David Brodie (Royal Navy officer) =

Captain David Brodie
- Born: c. 1709
- Died: 1787
- Military career
- Allegiance: Great Britain
- Branch: Royal Navy
- Service years: c.1734–1753
- Rank: Captain
- Commands: HMS Terror; HMS Merlin; HMS Canterbury; HMS Strafford
- Conflicts: War of the Austrian Succession; Battle of Porto Bello; Battle of Cartagena de Indias; Battle of Saint-Louis-du-Sud; Battle of Santiago de Cuba; Battle of Havana

Arms of Captain David Brodie

David Brodie (1709?–1787) was a captain in the Royal Navy. He commanded HMS Canterbury and HMS Strafford, and fought at the Battle of Porto Bello (1739), Battle of Santiago de Cuba (1748), and the Battle of Havana (1748).

== Early career ==
Brodie was one of a collateral branch of the Brodies of Brodie, after serving for many years, both in the navy and mercantile marine, was promoted to the rank of lieutenant on 5 October 1736. In 1739 he served under Vernon at Porto Bello, and in 1741 at Cartagena. On 3 May 1743 he was made commander, and appointed to the sloop Merlin in the West Indies, and for about four years was repeatedly engaged with French and Spanish cruisers and privateers, several of which he captured and brought in. In one of these encounters he lost his right arm. Early in 1747 Rear-Admiral Knowles appointed him acting captain of HMS Canterbury; but he was not confirmed in that rank until 9 March 1747–8, when, after the capture of Port Louis, he was appointed to HMS Strafford.

In this ship he was present at the unsuccessful attempt on Santiago, and had a distinguished share in the battle of Havana on 1 October 1748, when the one prize of victory, Conquistador, struck to Strafford. In the courts-martial which followed, Brodie's evidence told strongly against the admiral's accusers; he maintained that the admiral had done his duty throughout.

== Later career ==
In 1750 Brodie was compelled to memorialise the admiralty, representing himself as incapacitated from further service, and praying for some mark of the royal favour. In 1753 he presented another and stronger memorial to the same effect, consequent on which a pension was granted to him. Nevertheless, in 1762, on the declaration of war with Spain, he applied to the admiralty for a command. His application was not accepted, and accordingly when, in 1778, his seniority seemed to entitle him to flag rank, he was passed over as not having served "during the last war".' This was then the standing rule, and was in no way exceptional to Brodie, although in his case, as in many others, it fell harshly on old officers of good service. On 5 March 1787 Brodie's claims were brought up in the House of Commons, and he was represented as a much-injured man, deprived of the promotion to which he was justly entitled. The house negatived the motion made in Brodie's favour. The case, however, led to a modification of the rule, and from that time captains who were not eligible for promotion when their turn arrived were distinctly placed on a superannuated list. Brodie died in 1787, and was buried at the Abbey Church in Bath.
