= Battle of Santiago de Cuba (1748) =

1748 battle

- Part of the War of Jenkins' Ear
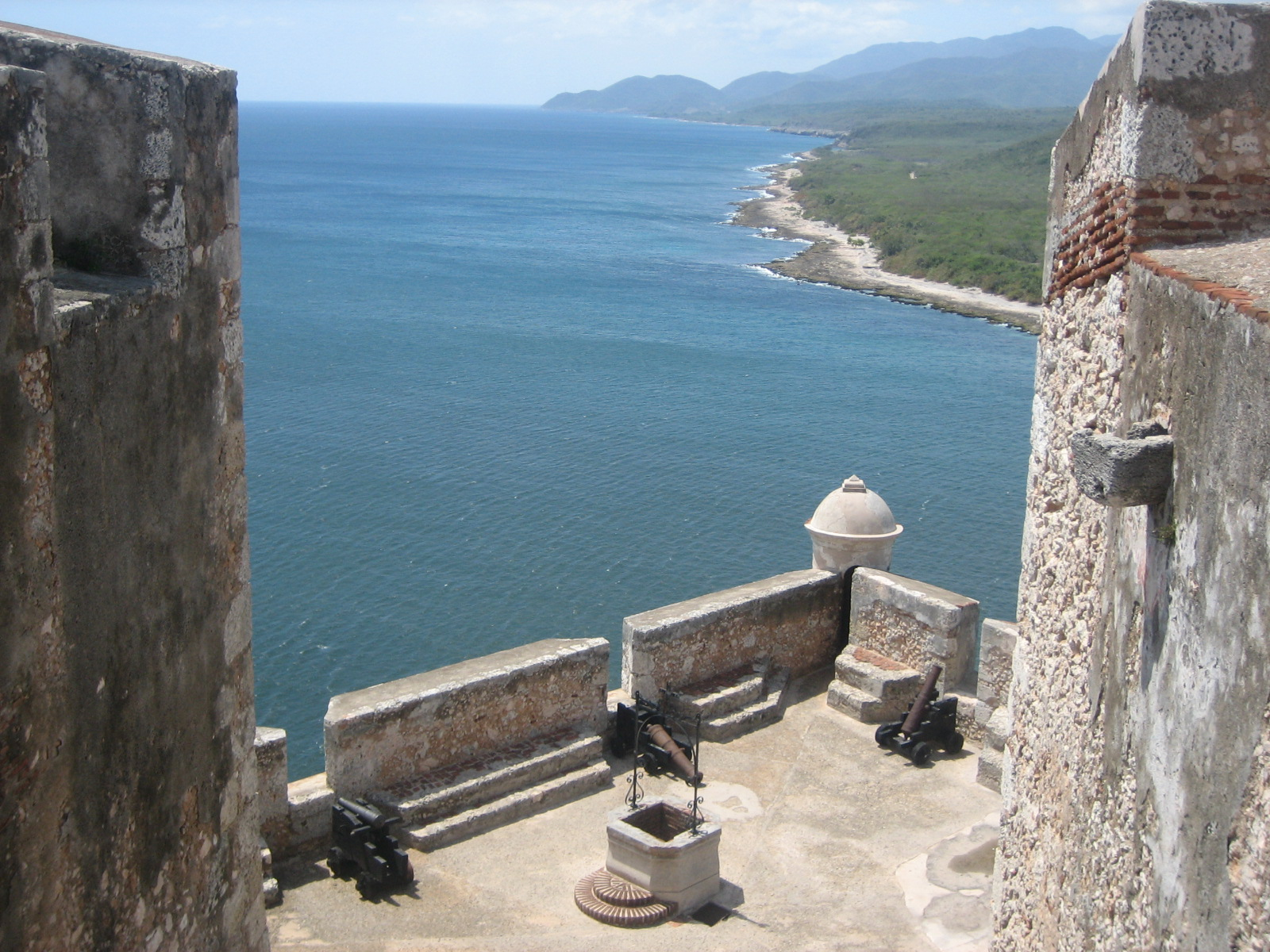
- View from Castillo del Morro to the Caribbean Sea.
Date	9 April 1748
Location	Santiago de Cuba, Cuba
Result	Spanish victory

Belligerents
Great Britain	Spain

Commanders and leaders
Charles Knowles	(Spain) Arcos Moreno

Strength
8 ships of the line 2 frigates 2 sloops 1 tender	500 regulars

Casualties and losses
100 killed ~200 wounded	Unknown

The battle of Santiago de Cuba, which took place on 9 April 1748, was a failed attempt by elements of the British Royal Navy under Rear-Admiral Charles Knowles to force the entrance of the port of Santiago de Cuba with the aim of striking a blow to the Spanish trade and privateering, since Santiago was a major base of the Spanish privateers in the Caribbean. Two British ships of line were put out of action by the batteries of Morro Castle and had to be towed to open sea. The remaining British warships retreated soon after.

== Background ==
Sir Charles Knowles, who had been promoted to rear-admiral of the white on 15 July 1747, and appointed as commander in chief on the Jamaica station, prepared in 1748 an expedition with the aim of recover from the setbacks suffered during the previous stages of the war by attacking the Spanish trade and protecting their own. On 17 February he departed Port Royal with 240 of Governor Trelawney's Jamaican troops aboard his 80-gun flagship HMS Cornwall, 60-gun HMS Plymouth, 70-gun HMS Elizabeth, 58-gun HMS Canterbury, 60-gun HMS Strafford, 60-gun HMS Warwick, 60-gun HMS Worcester, 50-gun HMS Oxford, and the 16-gun, 100-man sloops Merlin and Weazel. He had initially intended to take his squadron and attack Santiago de Cuba, but contrary winds led to him deciding instead to attack Fort Saint Louis de Sud. He arrived on 8 March 1748, and after subjecting the fort to a heavy bombardment forced its surrender. Attacks on Petit-Goâve and Cap-Français, however, had to be postponed due to lack of troops. It was therefore decided to proceed with the attack upon Santiago.

== Battle ==
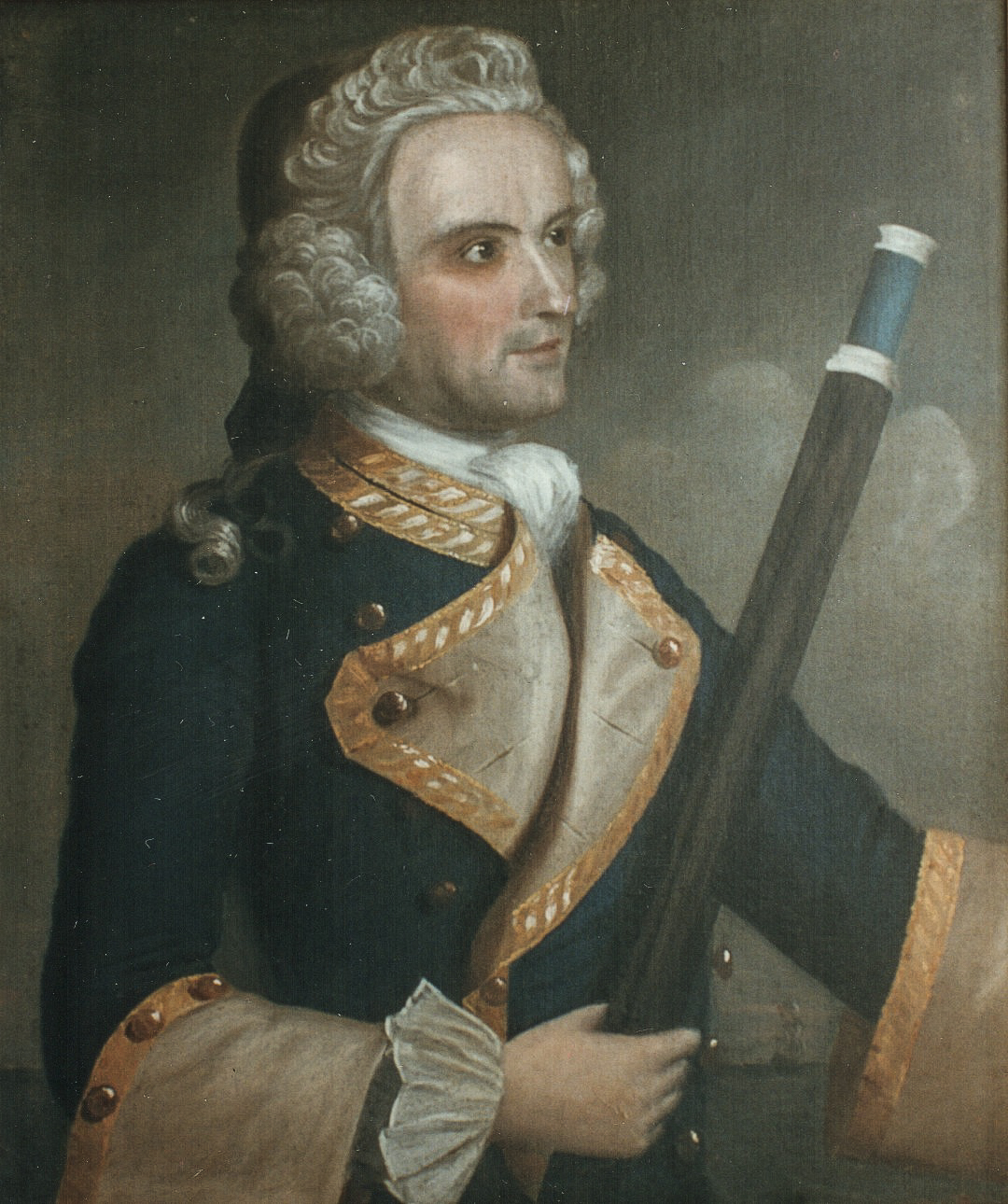
Charles Knowles, who commanded the British forces at the battle

The afternoon of 28 March, having been joined by HMS Lenox and the frigates Vainqueur, Vulture, and the tender Sharp, the British squadron arrived in sight of the Cuban coast. Its battle line was as follow: Plymouth, Cornwall, Canterbury (flagship), Elizabeth, Strafford, Warwick, Worcester, Lenox, Vainqueur in the van, Vulture abreast the flagship, and Sharp abreast the rear. Captain Dent's Plymouth, who had been detached to reconnoiter Santiago's entrance, noticed that it was not difficult. Faint winds, however, prevented Knowles to attack, forcing the squadron to lay off for the night within view of the Spaniards. The governor, Brig. Gen. Arcos Moreno, immediately ordered a ship of about 200 tons warped out of the inner bay to support a 10-inch hawser stretched from shore to shore, partially blocking the entrance. The probability of meeting with obstructions in the mouth has been taken into consideration, and a Spanish pilot had been brought aboard the British fleet to help to carry the British ships into the harbour. Dent, whose Plymouth has been selected to lead the attack, was ordered to shoot the pilot or throw him overboard if he raised any objections.

Canterbury was decided to be anchored off the end of the Apostle's battery to help the leading ships by shelling the Spanish fortifications with a 10-inch mortar taken at Fort Louis and mounted upon her quarterdeck. The flag was then hoisted aboard the Worcester, and when the sea breeze came in, was given the order to attack. The squadron stood in a breeze at S.E., giving it about four knots. Canterbury opened fire on the Mora as soon as he came within range. Plymouth, meanwhile, found a defensive chain across the harbour. Captain Dent sent the long boats and barges to clear the obstacle. His ship, however, came under fire from the Spanish batteries and was promptly disabled, losing her rudder, her mainmast and her bowsprit. Cornwall also endured heavy gunfire, losing some of her stern. Both ships had to be towed to open sea, having lost about 100 men killed and more than 200 wounded. Next day, after discuss how the obstacle could be removed, Knowles led his squadron back to Jamaica.

== Aftermath ==
After having his ships refitted Knowles sailed on a cruise, hoping to intercept the Spanish treasure fleet off Cuba. On 30 September he fell in with HMS Lenox, under Captain Charles Holmes, who reported that he had encountered a Spanish fleet some days earlier. The fleet was sighted the next morning but confusion over signals and a struggle to keep the weather gauge meant that the British fleet failed to attack in an organised manner. Though the Battle of Havana ended with the capture of one Spanish ship and another being badly damaged, it was not the major British victory hoped for. Knowles was accused of badly mismanaging the action and faced a court martial in December 1749. The result was a reprimand for the poor tactics he employed, while several of the other captains involved were also reprimanded. There was considerable bad feeling between Knowles and his subordinates, and several challenges to duel were issued. In once instance Knowles exchanged shots with Holmes, and in another two of his captains, Innes and Clarke, duelled, which resulted in Innes being mortally wounded. King George II eventually intervened to forbid any more duels over the matter.
