= HMS Fowey (1744) =

Frigate of the Royal Navy

Coordinates: 25°28′58.8″N 80°07′54.6″W

History

Great Britain
- Name: HMS Fowey
- Builder: Blaydes, Kingston upon Hull
- Launched: 14 August 1744
- Fate: Wrecked, 26 June 1748 off the coast of Florida

General characteristics
- Class & type: Fifth-rate warship
- Tons burthen: 709 tons
- Length: 127 ft (39 m)
- Beam: 36 ft (11 m)
- Propulsion: Sails
- Armament: 20 guns, rearmed to 44 guns in 1745

HMS Fowey was a fifth-rate warship of the Royal Navy, launched on 14 August 1744 in Hull, England. She spent only four years in commission before she struck a reef and sank in what is known today as Legare Anchorage in Biscayne National Park, off the coast of Florida. She was armed with six, nine, and eighteen pounder guns and crewed by more than 200 men.

== History ==
She was initially built to carry 20 guns, and was commanded from her commissioning until 1747 by Captain Policarpus Taylor, who would later rise to the rank of rear admiral. Fowey was first active in the English Channel and the waters off Gibraltar. In 1745, she was rearmed to carry 44 guns, and later that year engaged the French ship Griffon, which was wrecked in the ensuing battle.

Later, in 1746 Fowey escorted troop transports to the recently captured Fortress of Louisbourg on Cape Breton in Nova Scotia. For most of her career Fowey was assigned to a split duty station cruising the coast of North America from South Carolina to Boston during the summer and operating out of Port Antonio, Jamaica and the Caribbean in the winter. On 2 November 1747 Policarpus Taylor was reassigned to HMS Warwick, and was replaced by Captain Francis William Drake.

In June 1748, Fowey captured a Spanish ship, the St. Juan y Tadicos. While escorting this prize and two British colonial merchant vessels to her summer duty station off Virginia, Fowey ran onto a reef off of Hawk Channel and sank on 26 June. The English crew crowded onto the merchant vessels and navigated the hostile waters of Spanish Florida to Charleston. The crew of the St. Juan were given their parole and sailed for Havana.

== Discovery and Litigation ==
Two hundred and twenty-seven years would pass before the remains of the Fowey would be identified in 1975 by archaeologist George Fischer of the National Park Service. For many years, those searching for the wreck site had been distracted by the named obstacle, Fowey Rocks, which lie some distance to the north. However, from work commenced in the United Kingdom, by Major Paul Payne, who held an artefact from the original crew, navigational data became available, from which Mr Fischer narrowed the search. Four years later in 1979 a sport diver from Miami requested title in Admiralty Court to a "wrecked and abandoned sailing vessel with Legare Anchorage in Biscayne National Park." At this time the Abandoned Shipwreck Act was a decade in the future. The United States intervened in the lawsuit as the defendant seeking title, arguing that the shipwreck was public property in a National Park and, as such should be preserved as a part of the Nation's patrimony. In 1983, the United States won the case. The court decision constituted a landmark in United States historic shipwreck preservation case law. It stated that the remains of HMS Fowey were an archaeological site, not a ship in terms of Admiralty salvage; that the site was in no peril and did not need rescuing by the salvor; and that the site is public property and a part of the United States' heritage which ought to be managed in the best interests of the public rather than privately salvaged and sold for profit.

== Study ==
In the twenty five years since the wreck was identified, HMS Fowey has been broadly studied in the surviving documentary records of the United States, Canada, and Great Britain and has been the subject of three National Park Service field projects. The largest and best documented of these was conducted in 1983. Evidence of the wreck's function as a Royal Naval vessel include iron ballast blocks and guns, and copper gunpowder barrel hoops marked with the Broad Arrow denoting ownership by the crown. Its cultural affiliation is further denoted by the presence of English-made pewter, glass, and ceramic tablewares.
