= Wittewronge Taylor =

Captain in the Royal Navy

Wittewronge Taylor (1719?–1760), was a captain in the Royal Navy.

== Life ==
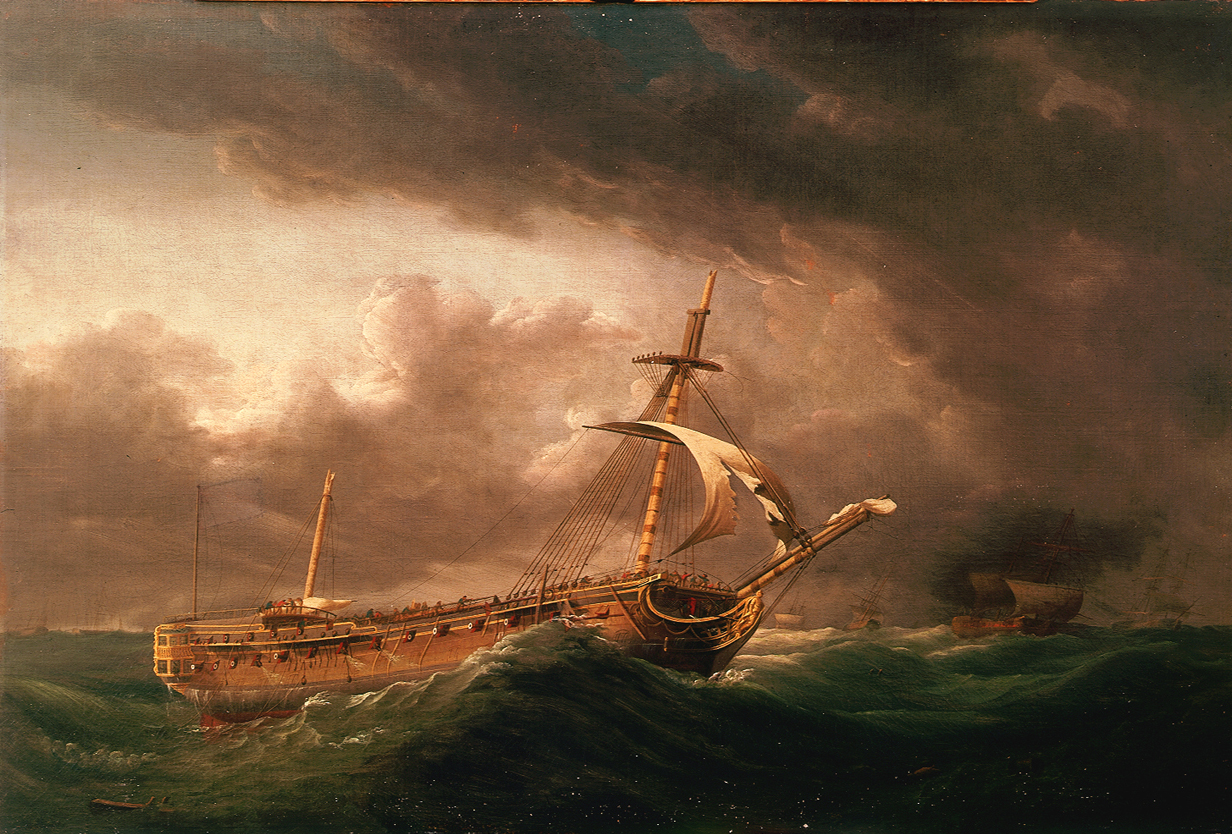
Loss of the Ramillies

Taylor was born about 1719, entered the navy as a volunteer-per-order or king's letter-boy, on board HMS Kingston about 1727, but the fact that he belonged in the next seventeen months to no fewer than seven ships seems to show that he was borne for time only without bodily presence. In 1734 he was borne on the books of HMS Blenheim, a harbour-ship, and his first seagoing experience would seem to have been in 1736 on board Windsor. In her and afterwards in HMS Ipswich and HMS Anglesea — in which last he was present at the abortive attack on Cartagena in April 1741—he served for about five years. He passed his examination on 3 September 1741, being then, according to his certificate, more than twenty-two, and having been more than ten years at sea. Four days afterwards he was promoted to be lieutenant of the Duke on the home station. In 1743–4 he was a lieutenant of HMS St. George, from which he was taken by Vice-Admiral Davers in October 1744 to go with him to the West Indies in HMS Cornwall, in the rating of midshipman extra. In August 1745 Davers gave him a commission as fifth lieutenant of HMS Cornwall (though the ship was only allowed four), and in November appointed him to command the Vainqueur tender. Eighteen months afterwards he was recalled to HMS Cornwall, in which he was present in the action off Havana on 1 October 1748 (see Sir Charles Knowles), and was afterwards promoted by Knowles to command the Weasel sloop and sent home. He paid her off in May 1749. In March 1755 he commanded HMS Seaford and afterwards HMS Raven in the English Channel, and with the western squadron till posted, on 2 December, to HMS Monarch. During the next two years Taylor held several temporary commands - HMS Magnanime, HMS Neptune, HMS Magnanime again, HMS Royal William — and early in 1758 was appointed to HMS Ramillies, the flagship of Sir Edward (afterwards Lord) Hawke, with whom he continued through 1758 and the blockade of Brest in 1759, while Hawke was teaching the navy what the blockade of Brest meant. After the many months at sea the Ramillies was in need of refitting, and when preparing to leave Torbay on 14 November Hawke struck his flag in the Ramillies and went on board HMS Royal George. Taylor remained in the Ramillies, and took her round to Plymouth to be repaired. The following February (1760) she sailed, one of a squadron of three-deckers under the command of Admiral Boscawen. A violent westerly gale drove them back; the ships were separated; the weather was thick and hazy, and the Ramillies was suddenly found in dangerous proximity to the Bolt Head. She let go her anchors, which brought her up for the moment; but the storm was at its height, the cables parted, and the ship was hurled on the rocks. Out of the crew of 734, twenty-five only and one midshipman, improbably said to have been William Falconer (1732–1769), author of The Shipwreck – whose name does not appear in the ship's paybook – were saved. (Note: The memoir in Charnock's Biography. Nav. vi. 151, is very meagre) (Note: further details are to be looked for in the logs, pay-books, and captain's letters in the Public Record Office.)
