= Invasion of Cuba (1741) =

English invasion during the War of Jenkins' Ear

Coordinates: 19.966°N 75.139°W

- Part of the War of Jenkins' Ear
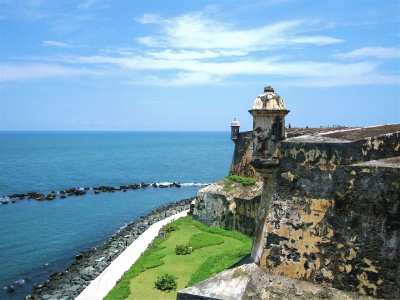
- Castle of El Morro on Santiago de Cuba
| Date | 4 August – 9 December 1741 |
| Location | Guantánamo Bay, Santiago de Cuba |
| Result | Spanish Victory |

Belligerents
| Great Britain | Spain |

Commanders and leaders
| (Kingdom of Great Britain) Edward Vernon | (Spain) Francisco de la Vega |

Strength
| 4,000 regulars & militia 9 ships of the line 12 frigates & other ships 40 transports & store-ships | 950 regulars and militia unknown naval forces |

Casualties and losses
| 3,445 killed, wounded or missing | 400 killed or wounded 3 warships captured |

The invasion of Cuba took place between 4–5 August and 9 December 1741 during the War of Jenkins' Ear. A combined army and naval force under the command of Admiral Edward Vernon and Major-General Thomas Wentworth arrived off Cuba and fortified positions around their landing site at Cumberland Bay. Despite facing no serious opposition, neither commander felt prepared to advance on the Spanish settlement at Santiago de Cuba. Harassed by Spanish raids and with a mounting sick list, the British finally evacuated the island after several months of inactivity.

== Background ==
Vernon had made an unsuccessful attempt to capture Cartagena in 1741, and after his repulse he directed the fragments of his sickly and dispirited followers against the island of Cuba. The south and east of Cuba were so little populated, and so far from the capital, Havana, that they might have made a permanent establishment there.

== Vernon's expedition ==
The land forces consisted of the remnants of the troops from Cartagena, some 3,000 British and American troops augmented by 1,000 Jamaican soldiers.

Vernon left Port Royal to capture Santiago de Cuba with the following ships:

- HMS Boyne 80 guns (Flagship)
- HMS Cumberland 80 guns
- HMS Grafton 70 guns
- HMS Kent 70 guns
- HMS Montague 60 guns
- HMS Tilbury 60 guns
- HMS Worcester 60 guns
- HMS Chester 50 guns
- HMS Tiger 50 guns
- HMS Experiment 20 guns
- HMS Sheerness 20 guns
- HMS Shoreham 20 guns
- HMS Alderney (Bomb vessel)
- HMS Phaeton (Fireship)
- HMS Strombolo (Fireship)
- HMS Vesuvius (Fireship)
- HMS Bonetta (Sloop)
- HMS Tryton (Sloop)
- HMS Princess Royal (Hospital ship)
- HMS Scarborough (Hospital ship)
- HMS Pompey (Tender)
- 40 Transports carrying 4,000 troops under Major-General Thomas Wentworth

== Battle ==
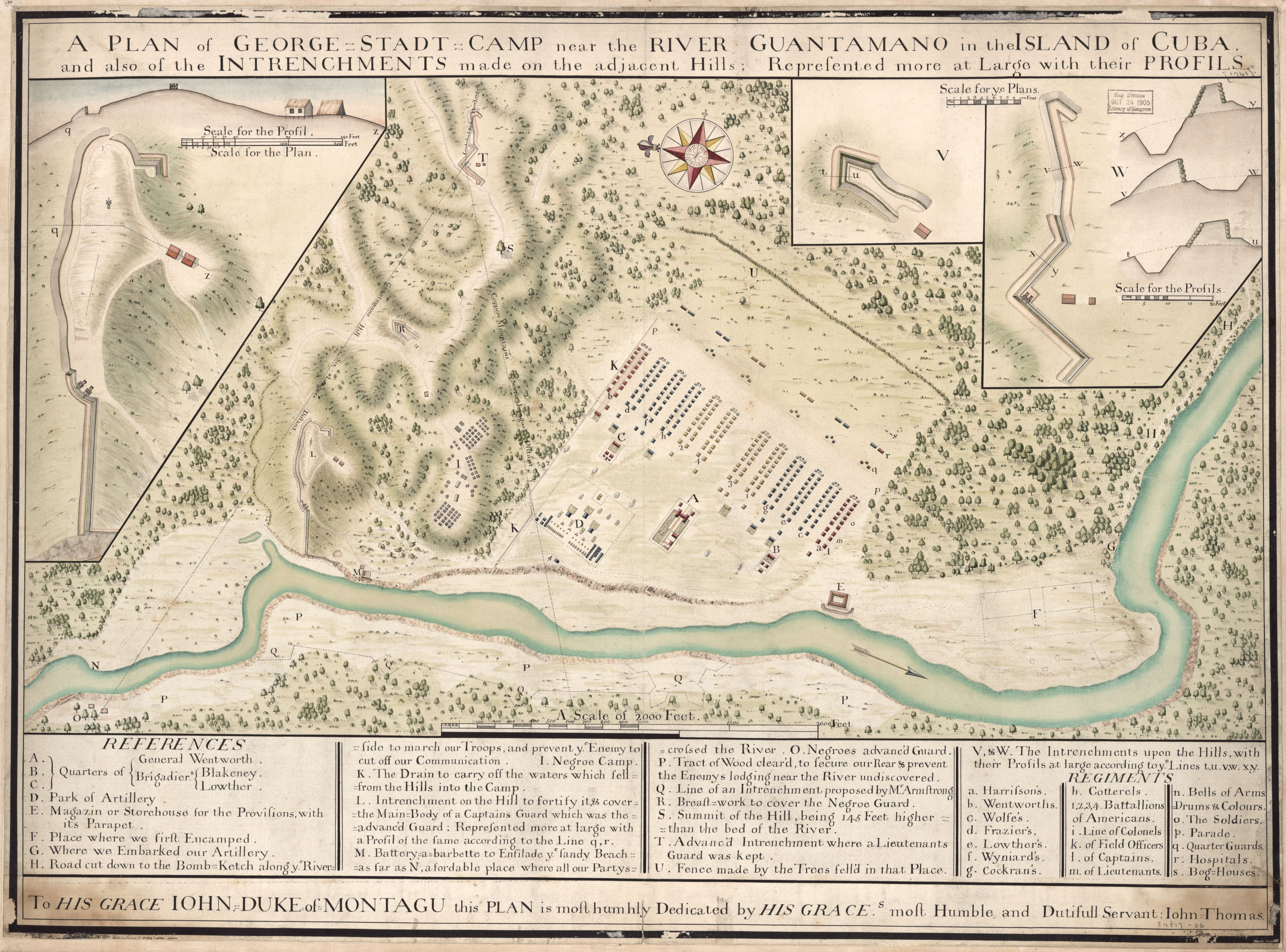
George Stadt Camp near the River Guantamano and the intrenchments made on the adjacent hills, 1741

On the night of 4–5 August, the British force, bolstered by 1,000 reinforcements from Jamaica landed in three different beaches of the Guantanamo Bay. Without opposition, they marched against the village of La Catalina. However, the British, 105 kilometres (65 mi) short of their objective, slowed down three days later because of the growing concerns of their commander, Major-General Thomas Wentworth.

Santiago's Governor Francisco Caxigal de la Vega, garrison commander Carlos Riva Agüero, and local militia Captain Pedro Guerrero had only 350 regulars and 600 militia to hand and so retreated from the British. Nevertheless, Wentworth's army became paralyzed by fatigue and disease, spending the next four months encamped, being sporadically raided by Spanish forces. Vernon, disgusted at his colleague's inactivity, but unwilling to risk any part of the fleet against the town, sent warships to cruise independently until Wentworth's sick list grew so long—2,260 soldiers being struck with fever by 5 December—that the expedition was re-embarked, setting sail at dawn on 9 December and returning to Port Royal ten days later.

== Aftermath ==
Admiral Vernon's enterprise accomplished nothing but the loss of many of his soldiers and his own disgrace. Vernon was forced to return to Britain in 1742.

== Bibliography ==
- Pares, Richard. War and Trade in the West Indies, Oxford university press, 1936 ISBN 0-7146-1943-4
- Richmond, H.W.. The Navy In the War of 1739-48, Vo; 1. Cambridge University Press, 1920.
- David E. Marley, Wars of the Americas; A Chronology of Armed Conflict in the New World, 1492 to the Present ABC-Clio Inc, 1998 ISBN 0-87436-837-5
- Beatson, Robert. Naval and Military memoirs of Great Britain from 1727 to 1783, London, Vol.I and Vol.III, 1801.
- Coke, Thomas. A History of the West Indies: Containing the Natural, Civil and Ecclesiastical History of Each Island London, 1810. OCLC 3865212
