= HMS Rippon (1712) =

Ship of the line of the Royal Navy

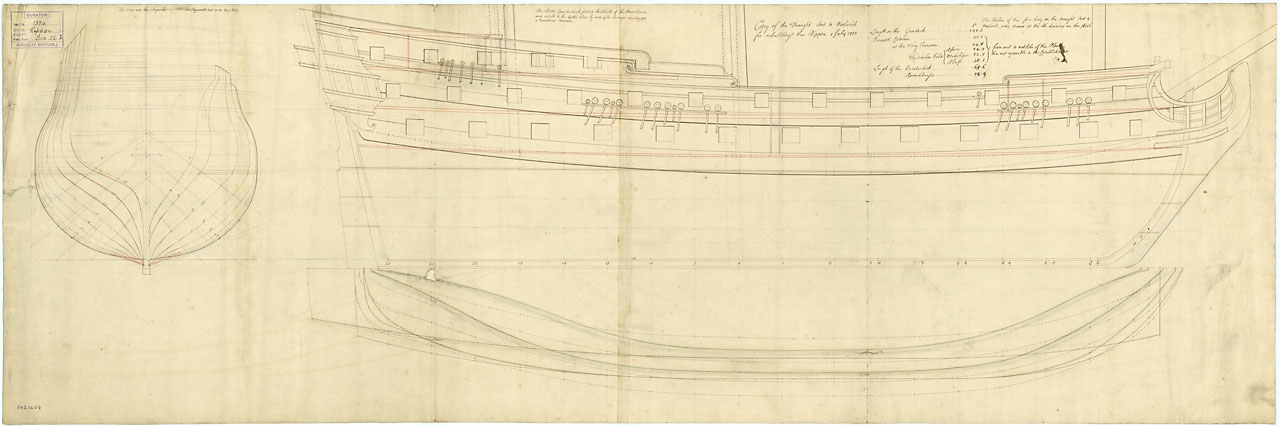
- Rippon 1735 rebuild

History

Great Britain
- Name: HMS Rippon
- Builder: Allin, Deptford Dockyard
- Launched: 23 August 1712
- Fate: Broken up, 1751

General characteristics as built
- Class & type: 1706 Establishment 60-gun fourth rate ship of the line
- Tons burthen: 924 tons BM
- Length: 144 ft (43.9 m) (gundeck)
- Beam: 38 ft (11.6 m)
- Depth of hold: 15 ft 8 in (4.8 m)
- Propulsion: Sails
- Sail plan: Full-rigged ship
- Armament: 60 guns: Gundeck: 24 × 24-pdrs; Upper gundeck: 26 × 9-pdrs; Quarterdeck: 8 × 6-pdrs; Forecastle: 2 × 6-pdrs

General characteristics after 1735 rebuild
- Class & type: 60-gun fourth rate ship of the line
- Tons burthen: 1,021 bm
- Length: 145 ft (44.2 m) (gundeck)
- Beam: 40 ft (12.2 m)
- Depth of hold: 16 ft 5 in (5.0 m)
- Propulsion: Sails
- Sail plan: Full-rigged ship
- Armament: 60 guns of various weights of shot

HMS Rippon was a 60-gun fourth rate ship of the line of the Royal Navy, built by Joseph Allin the elder at Deptford Dockyard and launched on 23 August 1712.

Orders were issued on 23 June 1730 directing that Rippon be taken to pieces and rebuilt at Woolwich. Unlike almost every other ship of the line rebuild of the time, Rippon was not reconstructed to the dimensions laid out in the naval establishments, though the differences were not pronounced. As an experiment into increasing the sizes of the Royal Navy's ships in response to the growth of foreign vessels Rippon had one foot added to the gundeck and keel lengths, and the breadth. In addition Centurion, a new-built ship, had previously been built with one foot great breadth over the standard dimensions of the 1719 Establishment. She was relaunched on 29 March 1735.

Rippon served until 1751, when she was broken up.
