= HMS Chester (1708) =

Ship of the line of the Royal Navy

History

Great Britain
- Name: HMS Chester
- Builder: Rosewell, Chatham Dockyard
- Launched: 18 October 1708
- Fate: Broken up, 1749

General characteristics
- Class & type: 1706 Establishment 50-gun fourth rate ship of the line
- Tons burthen: 704 bm
- Length: 130 ft (39.6 m) (gundeck)
- Beam: 35 ft (10.7 m)
- Depth of hold: 14 ft (4.3 m)
- Propulsion: Sails
- Sail plan: Full-rigged ship
- Armament: 50 guns: Gundeck: 22 × 18-pdrs; Upper gundeck: 22 × 9-pdrs; Quarterdeck: 4 × 6-pdrs; Forecastle: 2 × 6-pdrs

HMS Chester was a 50-gun fourth rate ship of the line of the Royal Navy, built at Chatham Dockyard to the 1706 Establishment of dimensions, and launched on 18 October 1708. Chester was placed on harbour service in 1743 and was broken up in 1749.

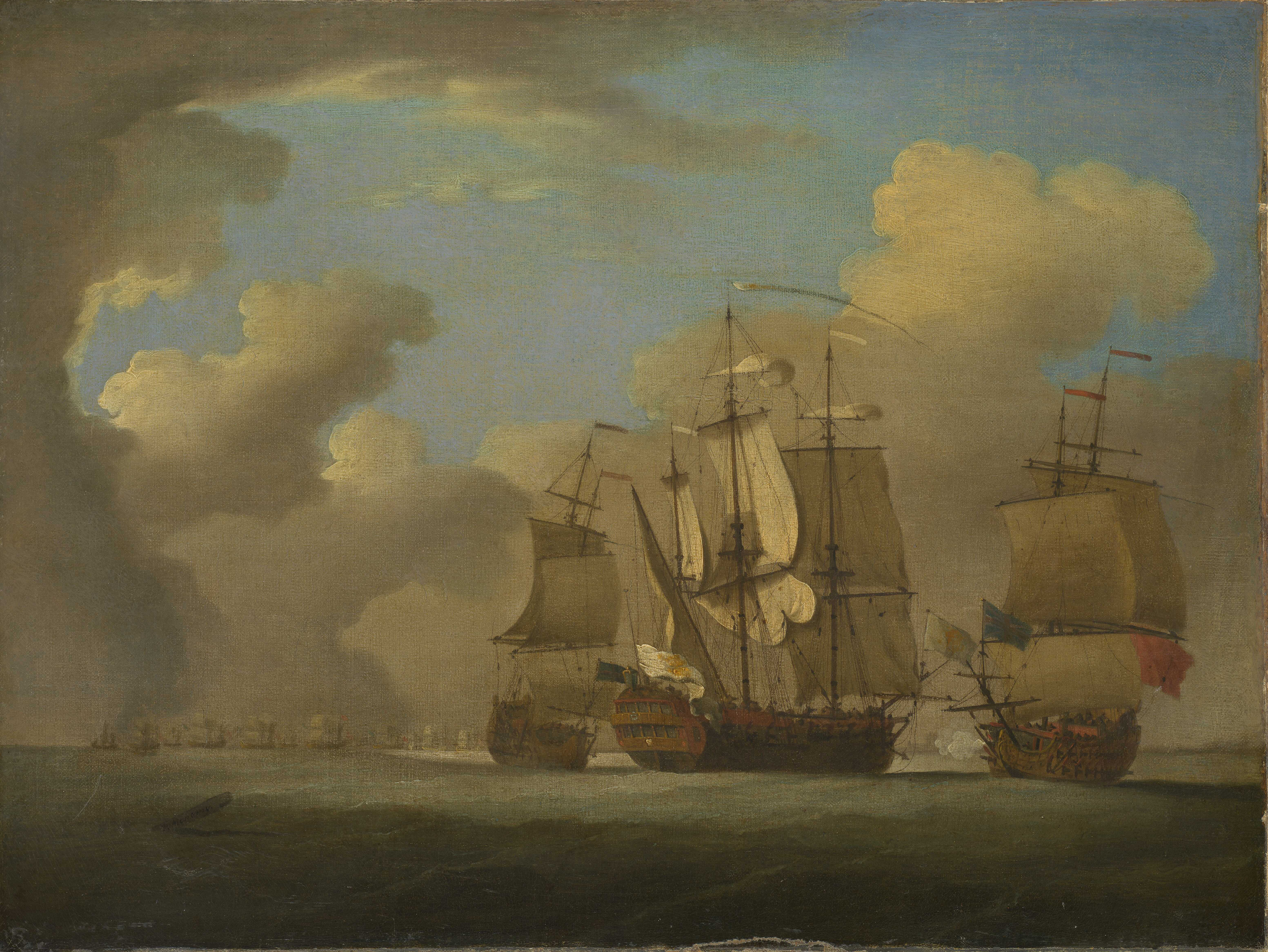
The Capture of the Spanish galleon St Joseph, 23 September 1739, Chester (left, and Canterbury (right side)

Chester along with HMS Canterbury, during the War of Jenkins' Ear captured the Spanish Caracca St Joseph on 23 September 1739. The St Joseph was probably the most valuable single prize of the war.
