= HMS Merlin (1744) =

Sloop of the Royal Navy

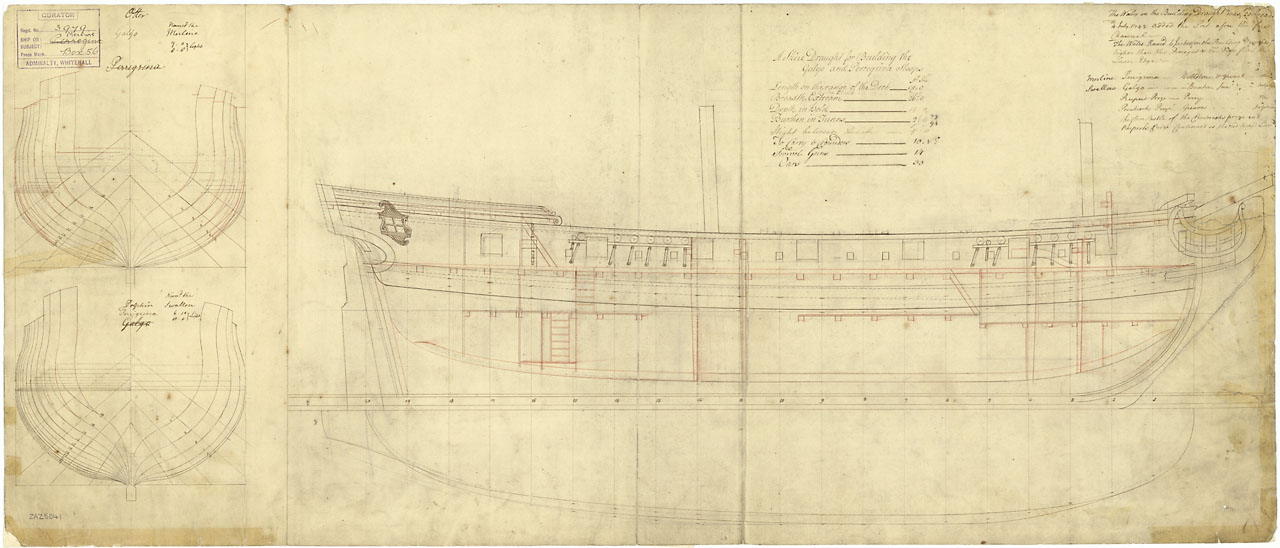
- Drawing of the Merlin, 1743

History

Great Britain
- Name: HMS Merlin
- Ordered: 7 July 1743
- Builder: Greville & Whetstone, Limehouse
- Laid down: 1 August 1743
- Launched: 20 March 1744
- Completed: 30 March 1744 at Deptford Dockyard
- Commissioned: February 1744
- Decommissioned: July 1748
- In service: 1744–1748
- Honours and awards: Battle of Saint-Louis-du-Sud, 1748
- Fate: Sold at Plymouth Dockyard, 16 November 1748

General characteristics
- Class & type: 10-gun Merlin-class sloop-of-war
- Tons burthen: 271 42/94 bm
- Length: 91 ft 0 in (27.7 m) (gun deck); 74 ft 9 in (22.8 m) (keel)
- Beam: 26 ft 0 in (7.9 m)
- Depth of hold: 6 ft 10 in (2.08 m)
- Sail plan: Two-masted snow rigging
- Complement: 110
- Armament: 10 × 6-pounder guns; 12 × ½-pdr swivel guns

HMS Merlin was a 10-gun snow-rigged sloop-of-war, the first of 21 Royal Navy vessels in the Merlin class. Launched in 1744, she was the first Royal Navy sloop to carry the new 6-pounder cannons, in place of the 3-pounder guns on predecessor craft. As a fast and comparatively heavily armed vessel, she saw active service against French privateers during the War of the Austrian Succession, capturing five enemy vessels during her four years at sea. She was also present for the Battle of Saint-Louis-du-Sud in 1748 but was too small to play a truly active role in bombarding the fort.

The sloop was decommissioned at the end of the War, and declared surplus to Admiralty needs in July 1748. She was sold out of Navy service at Plymouth Dockyard on 16 November 1748.

== Bibliography ==
- Winfield, Rif (2007). British Warships of the Age of Sail 1714–1792: Design, Construction, Careers and Fates. Barnsley, United Kingdom: Seaforth. ISBN 9781844157006.
