= Andrés Reggio =

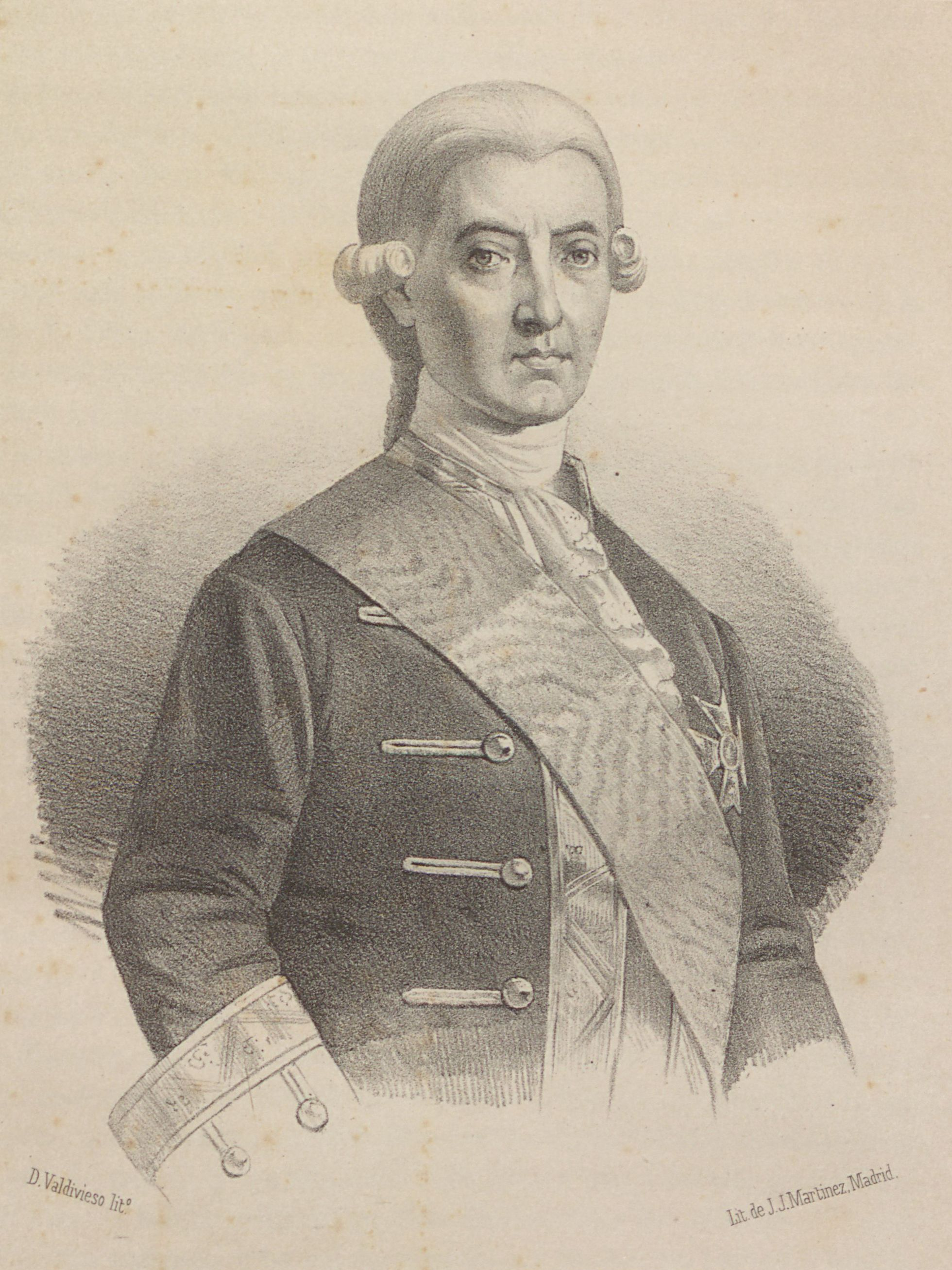
Portrait of Reggio

Captain general of the Navy Andrés Reggio y Brachiforte (11 February 1692 – 10 February 1780) was a Spanish Navy officer.

== Life ==
He was born in the Spanish-controlled Sicilian city of Palermo in 1692. He joined the navy as a young man and served throughout the War of the Quadruple Alliance serving in the invasion of Sardinia and at the Battle of Cape Passaro. In 1720, he took part in the relief expedition to besieged Ceuta and then moved to America, into the fleet of galleons in charge of bringing the money to the port of Cádiz. He returned to the Mediterranean in 1730, where he took part in operations including the reconquest of Oran in 1732 and Naples in 1733. For the next few years, he commanded the Spanish fleet in Ferrol.

In 1739, at the outbreak of the War of Jenkins' Ear he was appointed to command in the Caribbean. He oversaw major construction work to Havana in preparation of a future British attack. In 1748, he lost the Battle of Havana to the British Admiral Charles Knowles, but Knowles was unable to capitalise: the bullion-laden convoy passed unmolested. Reggio was court-martialled, but was then pardoned and commended by the King for his actions.

In 1749, he returned to Spain, and was appointed Captain-General of the navy, holding this position, he had a meeting on March 1, 1770, 4 days before the Boston Massacre, with a man with whom he had already met in the Antilles and who will have a key role in world history: the governor Luis de Unzaga and Amézaga 'le Conciliateur' to whom he will transfer various things of his own for his new position as governor of Louisiana and also a matter of maximum discretion and security such as the spy network that Unzaga will expand to help create the United States. He held the rank of Captain general of the Navy until his death in 1780, thirty-one years later.
