= HMS Cornwall (1692) =

Ship of the line of the Royal Navy

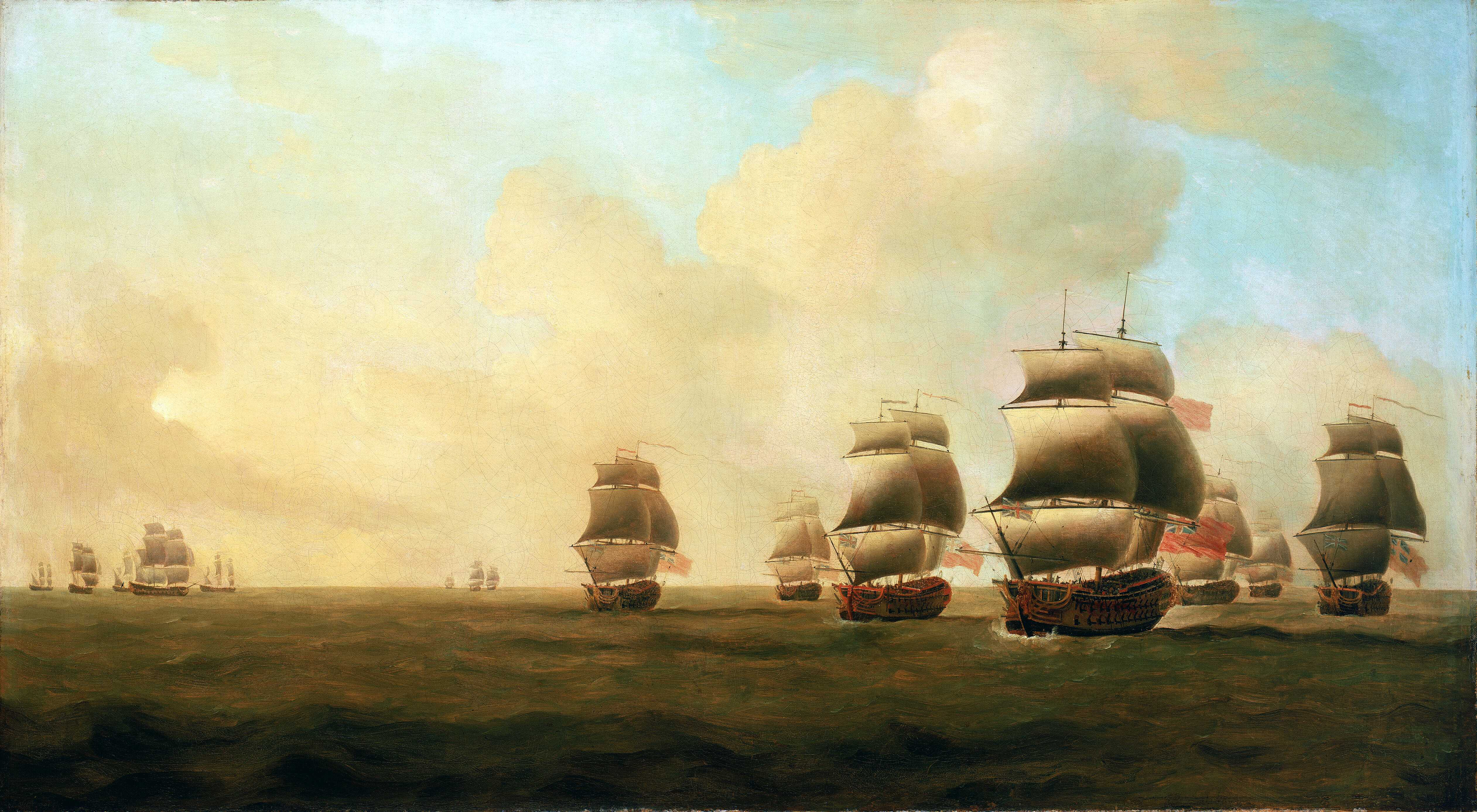
- Cornwall (fourth from right) at the Battle of Havana

History

Great Britain
- Name: HMS Cornwall
- Namesake: Cornwall
- Ordered: 12 March 1691
- Builder: Winter, Southampton
- Launched: 23 April 1692
- Commissioned: 1692
- Fate: Broken up, 1761
- Notes: Participated in: Battles of Barfleur and La Hougue

General characteristics (as built)
- Class & type: 80-gun, third rate ship of the line
- Tons burthen: 1,18631/94 (bm)
- Length: 156 ft 4 in (47.7 m) (gundeck)
- Beam: 41 ft 5 in (12.6 m)
- Depth of hold: 17 ft 3 in (5.3 m)
- Sail plan: Full-rigged ship
- Complement: 476–520
- Armament: 80 guns of various weights of shot

General characteristics (after 1706 rebuild)
- Class & type: 80-gun third rate ship of the line
- Tons burthen: 1,24121/94 (bm)
- Length: 156 ft 7.5 in (47.7 m) (gundeck)
- Beam: 42 ft 8.25 in (13.0 m)
- Depth of hold: 17 ft 7 in (5.4 m)
- Sail plan: Full-rigged ship
- Armament: 80 guns of various weights of shot

General characteristics (after 1726 rebuild)
- Class & type: 1719 Establishment 80-gun third rate ship of the line
- Tons burthen: 1,350 (bm)
- Length: 158 ft (48.2 m) (gundeck)
- Beam: 44 ft 6 in (13.6 m)
- Depth of hold: 18 ft 2 in (5.5 m)
- Sail plan: Full-rigged ship
- Armament: 80 guns: Gundeck: 26 × 32 pdrs; Middle gundeck: 26 × 12 pdrs; Upper gundeck: 24 × 6 pdrs; Quarterdeck: 4 × 6 pdrs

HMS Cornwall was an 80-gun third-rate ship of the line of the Royal Navy. Launched in 1692, she served in the Nine Years' War, and in her first year took part in the Battles of Barfleur and La Hougue.

== Description ==
Cornwall had a length at the gundeck of 156 feet 4 inches (47.7 m) and 129 feet 6 inches (39.5 m) at the keel. She had a beam of 41 feet 6 inches (12.6 m), and a depth of hold of 17 feet 3 inches (5.3 m). The ship's tonnage was 1,186 31/94 tons burthen. As built, the lower gundeck carried 24 broadside demi-cannon and a pair of chase culverins and the upper deck mounted 26 more culverins on the broadside and another pair as chase guns. On the quarterdeck were 16 six-pounder guns with 6 more on the forecastle. Above the quarterdeck, the poop deck carried 4 three-pounder guns. In 1703, Cornwall's armament was nominally revised to twenty-six 24-pounder guns on the lower gundeck and twenty-eight 12-pounder guns on the upper deck. The lighter guns were not changed, but it is uncertain if any changes were actually made to the ship's armament. The ship had a crew of 476–520 officers and ratings.

== Construction and career ==
Cornwall was the first ship in the Royal Navy to be named after the eponymous county. Part of the 1691 Naval Programme, the ship was ordered on 12 March 1691 and contracted out to John Winter in Southampton. She was launched at Southampton on 28 April 1692. She was rebuilt at Rotherhithe from 1705 to 1706. After this, she served in the Mediterranean where in the War of the Spanish Succession she was involved in the capture of a French convoy off Catalonia in May 1708.

On 16 January 1722 Cornwall was ordered to be taken to pieces and rebuilt at Deptford according to the 1719 Establishment. Remaining an 80-gun third rate, she was relaunched on 17 October 1726. After this, she served during peacetime in the Baltic and Mediterranean. She was not recommissioned until 1742, even though the War of the Austrian Succession had led to fighting between Great Britain and Spain in 1739. Cornwall initially served off Spain, but was later deployed to the West Indies where, in March 1748, she took part in the Battle of Saint-Louis-du-Sud in the French colony of Saint-Domingue. In October 1749, Cornwall captured a 64-gun Spanish warship during the defence of a convoy off Havana. She became a prison ship in 1755, ended her career in 1760 and was broken up in 1761.
