= HMS Warwick (1733) =

Former ship of the Royal Navy (1734–1756)

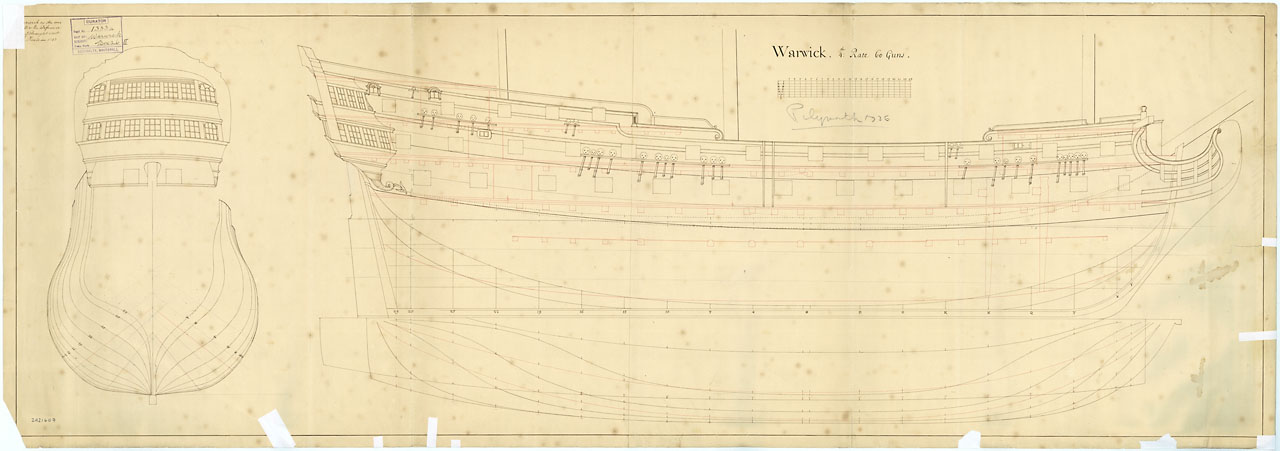
- Drawing showing the body plan, stern board outline, sheer lines with inboard detail, and longitudinal half-breadth for Warwick

History

Great Britain
- Name: HMS Warwick
- Ordered: 14 March 1727
- Builder: Peirson Lock, Plymouth Dockyard
- Laid down: 1 April 1730
- Launched: 25 October 1733
- Completed: 24 August 1734
- Commissioned: 1734
- In service: 1734–1736; 1739–1744; 1747–1749; 1755–1756
- Captured: by the French Navy, 11 March 1756

France
- Name: Warwick
- Acquired: by capture, 11 March 1756
- In service: 1756–1761
- Captured: by the Royal Navy, 24 January 1761
- Fate: Broken up, 1761

General characteristics
- Class & type: 1719 Establishment 60-gun fourth-rate ship of the line
- Tons burthen: 951 27/94 (bm)
- Length: 144 ft 0 in (43.9 m) (gundeck); 117 ft 0 in (35.7 m) (keel)
- Beam: 39 ft 0 in (11.9 m)
- Depth of hold: 16 ft 5 in (5.0 m)
- Sail plan: Full-rigged ship
- Complement: 400
- Armament: 60 guns: Gundeck: 24 × 24-pdrs; Upper gundeck: 26 × 9-pdrs; Quarterdeck: 8 × 6-pdrs; Forecastle: 2 × 6-pdrs

HMS Warwick was a 60-gun fourth-rate ship of the line of the Royal Navy, built to the 1719 Establishment at Plymouth by Peirson Lock. The keel was laid down on 1 April 1730, and the ship was launched on 25 October 1733, and completed on 24 August 1734.

== Service history ==
Warwick was commissioned under the command of Captain Edmund Brooke. She proved to be an inferior design; top-heavy and with a tendency to heel over in strong winds. In 1735 she was with the fleet of Admiral John Norris in the Tagus. In October 1736 she returned to England and was paid off.

She was recommissioned in June 1739 under the command of Captain John Toller, and served with Admiral Nicholas Haddock's fleet in the Mediterranean. Command had passed to Captain Temple West by 1743, under whom she was present at the Battle of Toulon on 11 February 1744.

She was recommissioned in January 1746 under the command of Captain Robert Erskine. On 14 July 1747, Warwick was off the Azores in company with the 40-gun Lark, Captain John Crookshanks, when she encountered the Spanish 74 Glorioso, sailing from the Spanish Main with 3 million dollars in treasure. Warwick attacked but, left unsupported, was beaten to a standstill, and the Glorioso escaped. Crookshanks, who was the senior officer, was cashiered.

In 1748, under the command of Captain Thomas Innes, Warwick was part of the squadron under Sir Charles Knowles in the Caribbean, and took part on the attacks on Fort Saint Louis de Sud and Santiago de Cuba in March and April, and in the Battle of Havana on 12 October 1748.

=== Capture by France ===
She was recommissioned in March 1755 under the command of Captain Molyneux Shuldham and sailed for the Leeward Islands. On 21 December 1755 Warwick was detached by Commodore Thomas Frankland to cruise in the neighbourhood of Martinique. At daybreak on 11 March 1756, three French ships were sighted, and Warwick attempted to escape. The ships were the 74-gun Prudent, under Aubigny, and the frigates Atalante, under Duchaffault, and Zéphyr. In the heavy seas Warwick was unable to bring her lower deck guns into action, and also her crew had been depleted by illness, with less than 300 from her crew of 400 fit. Atalante (34), Captain Du Chaffault, came up on her quarter, and kept up a steady fire, cutting up her rigging. Prudent then also drew in close and opened fire. Shuldham ordered his guns to fire on the larger ship, firing at Atalante with small-arms only. After half an hour, in a hopeless position, Warwick surrendered. Shuldham was held as a prisoner of war for two years. On his return to England he was court-martialled for the loss of his ship, but found to have "done his duty."

=== Recapture by Great Britain ===
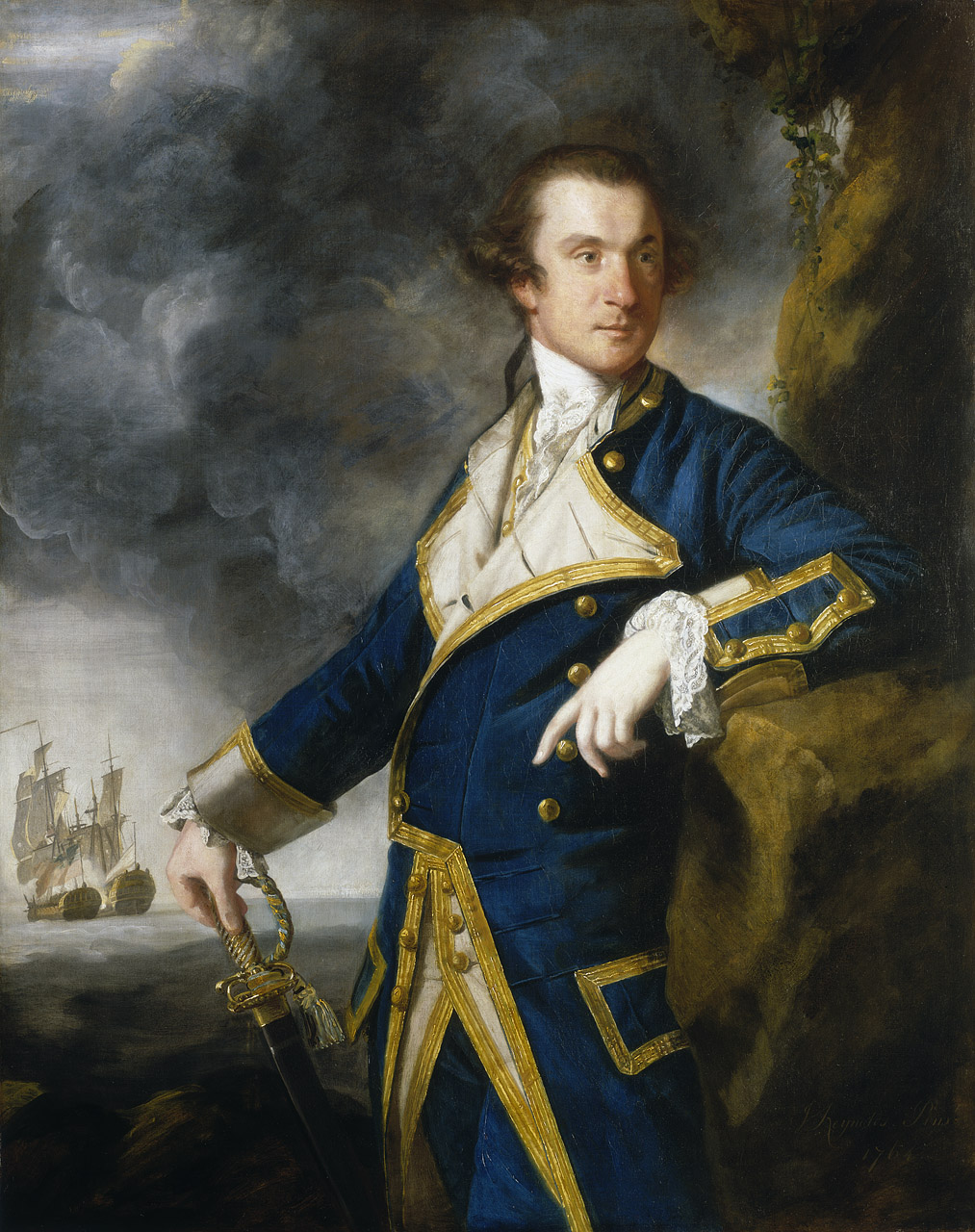
Portrait of Alexander Hood by Sir Joshua Reynolds, 1763. Minerva is shown in the background recapturing Warwick.

On 20 January 1761 Warwick sailed from Rochefort, mounting only 34 guns, and loaded with provisions, ammunition, stores, and a detachment of troops bound for the Isle de France (now Mauritius). On the 24th she was recaptured by HMS Minerva, under the command of Captain Alexander Hood, in the Bay of Biscay. She proved unfit for further service and was broken up later that year.

== See also ==
- List of ships captured in the 18th century
