= HMS Oxford (1674) =

Ship of the line of the Royal Navy

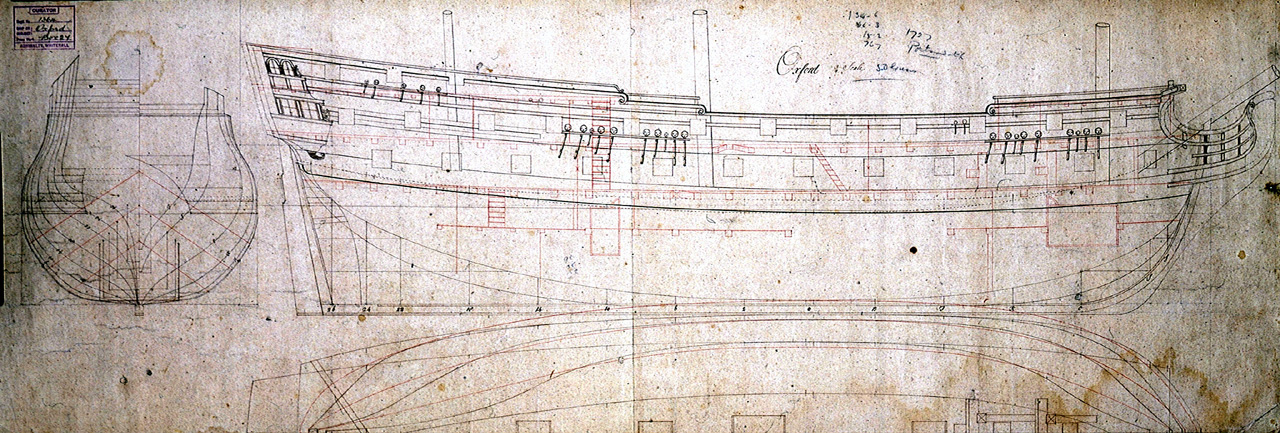
- Oxford, plan of her 1727 rebuild

History

Great Britain
- Name: HMS Oxford
- Ordered: 11 September 1672
- Builder: Baylie, Bristol
- Launched: June 1674
- Fate: Broken up, 1758

General characteristics as built
- Class & type: 54-gun fourth-rate ship of the line
- Tons burthen: 670.2 tons
- Length: 109 ft (33 m) (keel)
- Beam: 34 ft (10 m)
- Depth of hold: 15 ft 6 in (4.72 m)
- Propulsion: Sails
- Sail plan: Full-rigged ship
- Armament: 54 guns of various weights of shot

General characteristics after 1727 rebuild
- Class & type: 1719 Establishment 50-gun fourth rate ship of the line
- Tons burthen: 767 tons
- Length: 134 ft (41 m) (gundeck)
- Beam: 36 ft (11 m)
- Depth of hold: 15 ft 2 in (4.62 m)
- Propulsion: Sails
- Sail plan: Full-rigged ship
- Armament: 50 guns: Gundeck: 22 × 18-pdrs; Upper gundeck: 22 × 9-pdrs; Quarterdeck: 4 × 6-pdrs; Forecastle: 2 × 6-pdrs

HMS Oxford was a 54-gun fourth-rate ship of the line of the Royal Navy, built by Francis Baylie in Bristol and launched in June 1674. Her guns comprised twenty-two 24-pounders on the lower deck, with twenty-two large sakers (8-pounders) on the upper deck and ten smaller sakers (5-pounders) on the quarterdeck.

On 23 February 1684, Captain John Tyrrell was appointed to command the ship. In 1692 she was at the Battle of Barfleur under the command of Captain James Wishart. From 1701 to 1702 Oxford underwent a Great Repair amounting to rebuilding at Deptford.

On 29 June 1723 she was ordered to be taken to pieces at Portsmouth Dockyard, and rebuilt by Joseph Allin the younger to the lines of a 50-gun fourth rate of the 1719 Establishment. She relaunched on 10 July 1727.

Towards the end of the Seven Years' War the ship was commanded by Mariot Arbuthnot.

Oxford was broken up in 1758.
