= HMS Strafford (1735) =

Ship of the line of the Royal Navy

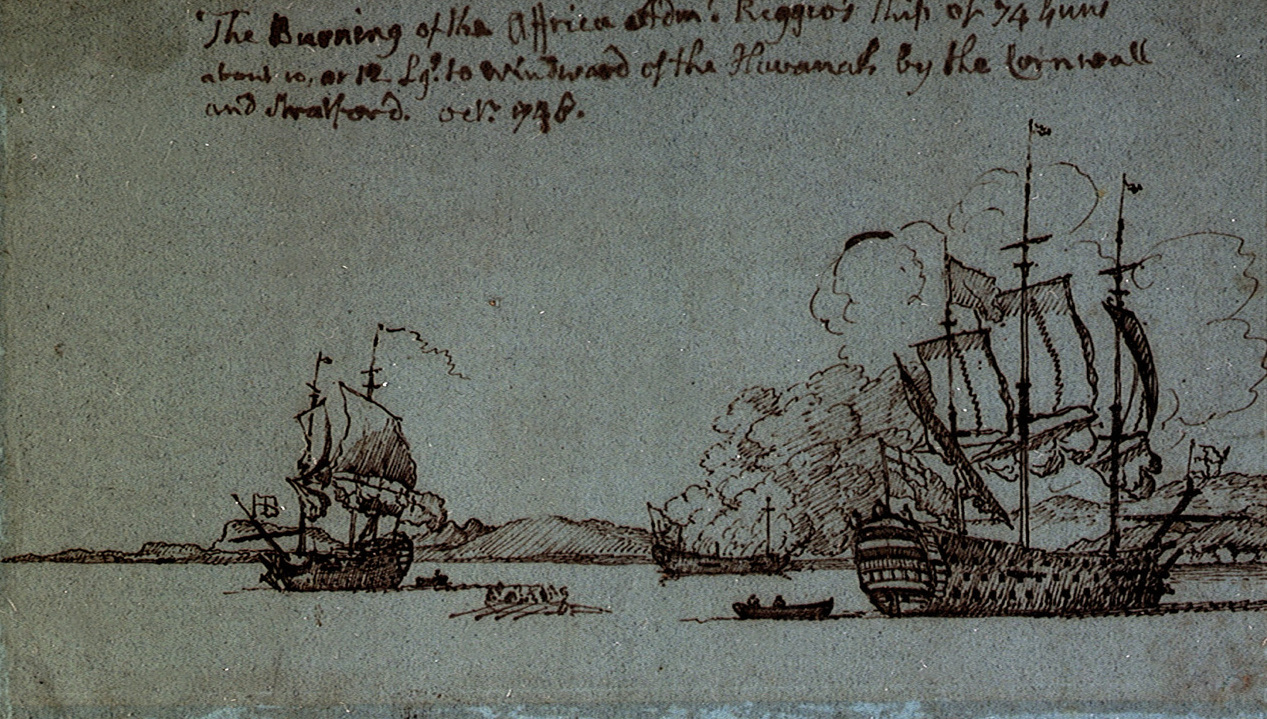
- Strafford (first from right) at the Battle of Havana

History

Great Britain
- Name: HMS Strafford
- Ordered: 4 September 1733
- Builder: Chatham Dockyard
- Launched: 24 July 1735
- Fate: Sunk as a breakwater, 1756

General characteristics
- Class & type: 1733 proposals fourth-rate
- Tons burthen: 1067
- Length: 144 ft (43.9 m) (gundeck)
- Beam: 41 ft 5 in (12.6 m)
- Depth of hold: 16 ft 11 in (5.2 m)
- Propulsion: Sails
- Sail plan: Full-rigged ship
- Armament: 60 guns: Gundeck: 24 × 24-pdrs; Upper gundeck: 26 × 9-pdrs; Quarterdeck: 8 × 6-pdrs; Forecastle: 2 × 6-pdrs

HMS Strafford was a 60-gun fourth-rate ship of the line of the Royal Navy. Built to the 1733 proposals of the 1719 Establishment of dimensions at Chatham Dockyard, she was launched on 24 July 1735.

== Engagements ==
HMS Strafford took part in the capture of Fort San Lorenzo in Panama in March 1740 as part of a squadron commanded by Vice-admiral Edward Vernon during the War of Jenkins' Ear. At 3 pm on 22 March 1740, the British squadron, composed of the ships Strafford, Norwich, Falmouth and Princess Louisa, the frigate Diamond, the bomb vessels Alderney, Terrible and Cumberland, the fireships Success and Eleanor, and transports Goodly and Pompey, under Vernon's command, began to bombard the Spanish fortress. Given the overwhelming superiority of the British forces, Captain Juan Carlos Gutiérrez Cevallos surrendered the fort on 24 March after resisting for two days. She fought at the Battle of Havana in 1748. Strafford served until 1756, when she was sunk as part of a breakwater.
