= HMS Elizabeth (1706) =

Ship of the line of the Royal Navy

- Elizabeth

History

Great Britain
- Name: HMS Elizabeth
- Builder: Stacey, Woolwich Dockyard
- Launched: 1 August 1706
- Fate: Broken up, 1766

General characteristics as built
- Class & type: 70-gun third rate ship of the line
- Tons burthen: 1110 tons BM
- Length: 150 ft 6 in (45.9 m) (gundeck)
- Beam: 40 ft 11.75 in (12.5 m)
- Depth of hold: 17 ft 4 in (5.3 m)
- Propulsion: Sails
- Sail plan: Full-rigged ship
- Armament: 70 guns of various weights of shot

General characteristics after 1737 rebuild
- Class & type: 1733 proposals 70-gun third rate ship of the line
- Tons burthen: 1224 tons BM
- Length: 151 ft (46.0 m) (gundeck)
- Beam: 43 ft 5 in (13.2 m)
- Depth of hold: 17 ft 9 in (5.4 m)
- Propulsion: Sails
- Sail plan: Full-rigged ship
- Armament: 70 guns: Gundeck: 26 × 24-pdrs; Upper gundeck: 26 × 12-pdrs; Quarterdeck: 14 × 6-pdrs; Forecastle: 4 × 6-pdrs

Plan of 1937 rebuild

HMS Elizabeth was a 70-gun third rate ship of the line of the Royal Navy, built at Woolwich Dockyard and launched on 1 August 1706.

On 4 September 1733 orders were issued directing Elizabeth to be taken to pieces and rebuilt according to the 1733 proposals of the 1719 Establishment at Chatham, from where she was relaunched on 29 November 1737.

From beginning 1758 to the latter end of 1764, william Nichelson, was her captain commisissioned to sail to and from India, for the purpose of charting or adding to charts navigation detail. The results of which appeared in several books, not least William Nichelson's Voyage to the East Indies, in His Majesty's Ship Elizabeth, Published in the Year 1765, and A new directory for the East-Indies, published in book form 1791. In 1763 Nichelson (who also served as the Superintendent of the Royal Navy in Bombay) also extensively charted Bombay Harbour.

Elizabeth continued to serve until 1766, when she was broken up.
