= HMS Canterbury (1693) =

Ship of the line of the Royal Navy

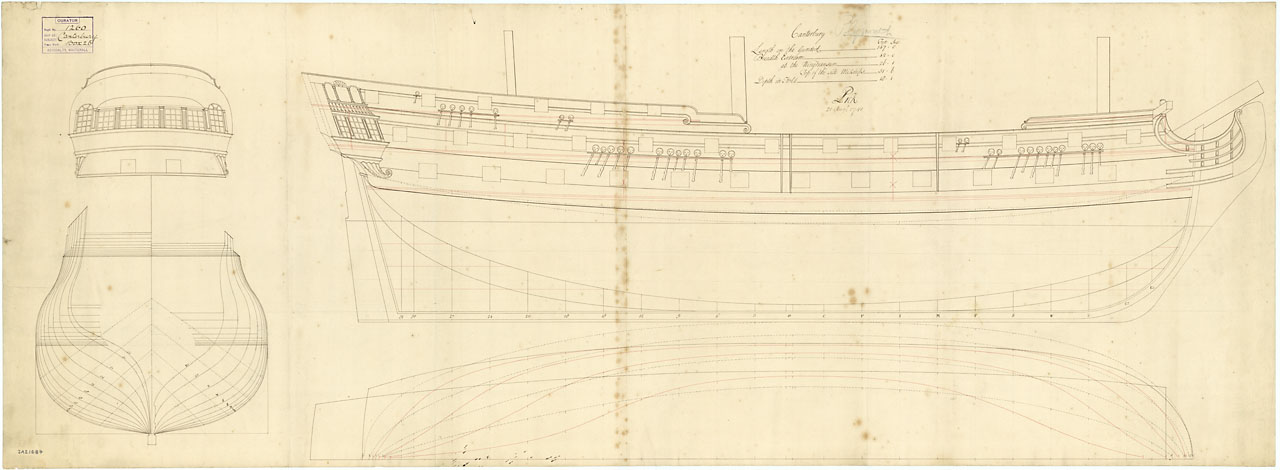
- Plan of the 1744 rebuild of Canterbury

History

Great Britain
- Name: HMS Canterbury
- Builder: Snelgrove, Deptford
- Launched: 18 December 1693
- Fate: Broken up, 1770

General characteristics as built
- Class & type: 60-gun fourth-rate ship of the line
- Tons burthen: 903 bm
- Length: 144 ft 9 in (44.1 m) (gundeck)
- Beam: 38 ft 1.5 in (11.6 m)
- Depth of hold: 15 ft 7 in (4.7 m)
- Propulsion: Sails
- Sail plan: Full-rigged ship
- Armament: 60 guns of various weights of shot

General characteristics after 1722 rebuild
- Class & type: 1719 Establishment 60-gun fourth-rate ship of the line
- Tons burthen: 964 bm
- Length: 144 ft (43.9 m) (gundeck)
- Beam: 39 ft (11.9 m)
- Depth of hold: 16 ft 5 in (5.0 m)
- Propulsion: Sails
- Sail plan: Full-rigged ship
- Armament: 60 guns: Gundeck: 24 × 24 pdrs; Upper gundeck: 26 × 9 pdrs; Quarterdeck: 8 × 6 pdrs; Forecastle: 2 × 6 pdrs

General characteristics after 1744 rebuild
- Class & type: 1741 proposals 58-gun fourth-rate ship of the line
- Tons burthen: 1117 bm
- Length: 147 ft (44.8 m) (gundeck)
- Beam: 42 ft (12.8 m)
- Depth of hold: 18 ft 1 in (5.5 m)
- Propulsion: Sails
- Sail plan: Full-rigged ship
- Armament: 58 guns: Gundeck: 24 × 24 pdrs; Upper gundeck: 24 × 12 pdrs; Quarterdeck: 8 × 6 pdrs; Forecastle: 2 × 6 pdrs

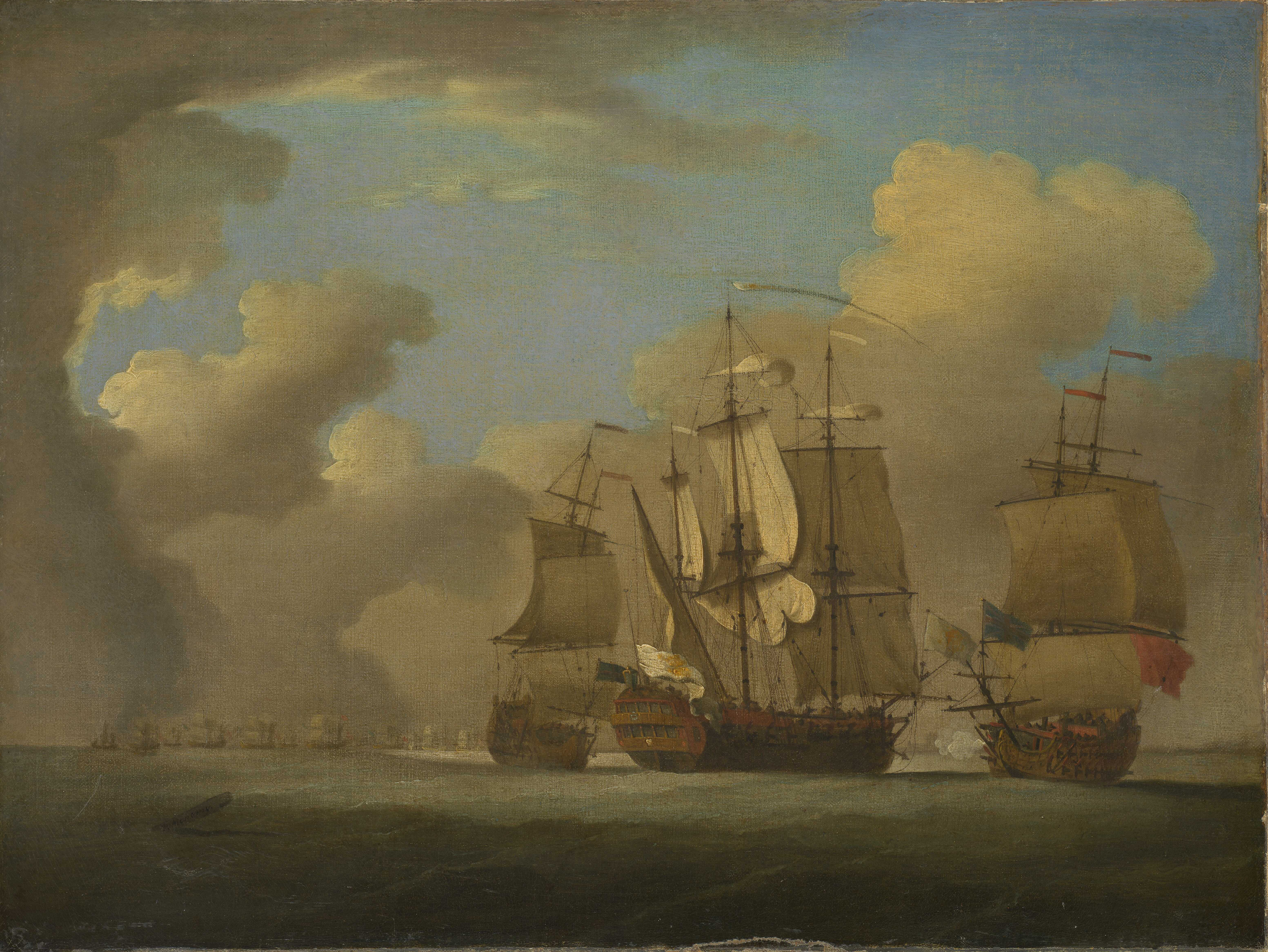
Canterbury (first from right) at the capture of the Spanish galleon San Josef on 23 September 1739

HMS Canterbury was a 60-gun fourth-rate ship of the line of the Royal Navy, launched at Deptford on 18 December 1693.

She was rebuilt at Portsmouth according to the 1719 Establishment, and was relaunched on 15 September 1722.

Canterbury along with HMS Chester, during the War of Jenkins' Ear captured the Spanish Caracca St Joseph on 23 September 1739. The St Joseph was probably the most valuable single prize of the war.

On 25 April 1741, she was ordered to be taken to pieces and rebuilt at Plymouth Dockyard as a 58-gun fourth rate according to the 1741 proposals of the 1719 Establishment. She was relaunched on 5 February 1744.

Canterbury was placed on harbour service in 1761, and was broken up in 1770.
