= 1719 Establishment =

Formalised set of dimensions for Royal Navy vessels

Class overview
- Operators: Royal Navy
- Preceded by: 1706 Establishment
- Succeeded by: 1745 Establishment
- Built: 1720–1750

The 1719 Establishment was a set of mandatory requirements governing the construction of all Royal Navy warships capable of carrying more than 20 naval long guns. It was designed to bring economies of scale through uniform vessel design and ensure a degree of certainty about vessel capability once at sea, and was applied to all vessels from the first-rate to the fifth-rate. Once in effect, it superseded the 1706 Establishment, which had specified major dimensions for ships of the second-rate, third-rate and fourth-rate only.

The new Establishment in 1719 was not simply limited to specifying the overall dimensions of each type of warship, but now set out in great detail other factors used in constructing the ship, down to the thickness of timbers ("scantlings") used in construction and planking.

The Establishment adopted in 1719 was subject to substantial revisions in both 1733 and 1741, although on neither occasion was the 1719 Establishment replaced. A new Establishment was finally adopted in 1745.

Before the 1745 centralised all design work in the office of the Surveyor of the Navy, the design of every vessel was the responsibility of the Master Shipwright in the dockyard in which that vessel was built; thus ships built to one Establishment has to conform to the dimensions and other measurements specified by that Establishment, but were to varying designs and therefore did not constitute a "class" in the modern use of the term. The exception to this was when ships were built under contract by commercial shipbuilders, for which a common design was prepared by the Surveyor and copies sent to the shipbuilder for execution; this only applied to some of the two-decker ships and smaller vessels (all three-deckers were built or rebuilt in the Royal Dockyards), and was almost exclusively a wartime occurrence.

== Background ==
When the 1706 Establishment had been introduced, British naval architecture had entered a period of highly conservative stagnation. The Establishments were intended to create standardisation throughout the fleet, in part to reduce the cost of maintaining Britain's large navy. The side effect was to almost eliminate any design innovation until the abolition of the Establishments in the early 1750s.

When King George I ascended the throne in 1714, thus beginning the Hanoverian dynasty in Great Britain, the main institutions of the Royal Navy – the Board of Admiralty and the Navy Board – underwent the typical reorganisations associated with a change of régime. While the Admiralty became a much more political body, the Navy Board became populated by men who had learnt their trade during the formative years of the Establishment system. A very significant factor in the formation of the 1719 Establishment and its subsequent longevity is that the period of 1714–1739 was the most peaceful of the 18th century.

A further contributory factor was the introduction of a new Establishment of Guns in 1716. Previously, gun establishments had catered for each ship, as there were often differences between ships of the same nominal size that would affect the armament they could carry. The 1716 gun establishment was intended to overturn that situation, so that all ships of a particular type (for example, 70 gun ships) would carry the same armament. The Navy Board highlighted the fact that there were still several ships in service that were physically incapable of carrying the prescribed armament, either due to the number and disposition of gunports, or to the sturdiness of build. Essentially, however, the Navy Board resolved to undertake the task of having all ships rebuilt to common designs to facilitate the new gun establishment.

== 1719 arrangements ==
The new Establishment of dimensions, finalised in December 1719, was significantly more detailed than its predecessor. Admiralty instructions to the Navy Board were for comprehensive plans outlining in what manner all ships "may most properly be built (or rebuilt), to prove good sailors as well as ships of force." The 1706 Establishment had sought to constrain only the basic dimensions (gundeck length, keel length, breadth, and depth in the hold), whereas the 1719 Establishment detailed everything from the keel length to the thickness of planks on each deck. The new Establishment was also expanded in scope to include first rates, the dimensions for which were to be based upon HMS Royal Sovereign. In the other direction, the new Establishment expanded down to include the sixth rates and the smaller (30-gun) fifth rates, so that all ships with 20 guns or more were covered. The dimensions for other ship types were adjusted according to experience with ships built to the 1706 Establishment.

Work on the 1719 Establishment was centralised at Deptford Dockyard with input from other yards. Plans were drawn up over 22 weeks from June to mid-November 1719. The largest component of this work was the development of an Establishment for first-rates which had not been covered by any earlier standardised plans. The final first-rate Establishment drew heavily on the structure and dimensions of Royal Sovereign, which was laid up for repairs at Chatham Dockyard. Final plans for all rates of vessels were presented to the Admiralty on 13 November and approved five days later for implementation in all new ships and those undergoing major repair.

== 1733 proposals and revisions ==
Over time, as British shipbuilding remained stagnant, Britain's foreign maritime rivals, most notably France, continued developing their own ships so that eventually the Navy Board was forced to take note. British ships, by comparison with their foreign counterparts, were usually significantly smaller – a practice that had come about through a combination of various factors differentiating the role of the Royal Navy from that of the continental navies, but a major factor was the need for a sizeable fleet, and the associated requirement to keep costs as low as practicable. However, by 1729 concerns were being expressed that the ships being built to the 1719 Establishment may be too small, and so a new ship, HMS Centurion, and HMS Rippon which was due for rebuilding, were built with slightly altered dimensions.

In 1732 the Admiralty decided to ask the Master Shipwrights in each of the Royal dockyards to report to them on how best they thought the ships could be improved. The responses, when they finally arrived, were conservative, offering only minor adjustments to certain dimensions. There was little agreement between the changes proposed, and no further progress was made until May 1733 when Sir Jacob Ackworth of the Navy Board – the Surveyor of the Navy at the time – proposed to the Admiralty some changes to the dimensions of the 50-gun and 60-gun ships, most notably an increase in breadth. The Admiralty accepted these proposals, and the ones that followed in later months for the other types, and these new dimensions became the effective new Establishment, though they never technically superseded the 1719 dimensions; there was no 1733 Establishment. Indications are that the Admiralty desired more far-reaching reforms than what was actually implemented, but due in part to the absence of anyone with practical shipbuilding knowledge on the Board, the Board of Admiralty lacked the ability to realise them.

== 1741 proposals and revisions ==
The true state of British ship design became apparent with the start of the War of Jenkins' Ear. The capture of the Spanish 70-gun ship Princessa in April 1740 by three British 70-gun ships (HMS Kent, HMS Lennox and HMS Orford) took six hours of fighting despite one of Princessa's topmasts being missing. Her greater size (much closer to that of a British 90-gun ship than a 70) gave her stability that the British ships lacked, and her build quality allowed her to withstand the pounding from the three British ships for a long time. By way of response to the now apparent individual inferiority of British ships over their opponents, a previously abandoned update to the gun establishment was called upon to increase the firepower of the ships. With heavier guns came the need for larger ships to carry them, and so Sir Jacob made a new set of proposals for increased dimensions—slightly less conservative this time around. Additionally, the new gun establishment made some changes to the types of ships that would be on the navy list in future. The 70-gun ships would become 64-gunners, albeit with heavier guns as compensation, and the 60-gun ships were to become 58-gun ships, again with heavier guns. No first rates were built to the dimensions of the 1741 proposals, but one ship of 74 guns and two of 66 were constructed.

An additional side effect of the war was the collapse of the system of rebuilding. Until the outbreak of the war, it had been the practice to rebuild ships periodically, to maintain the size of the fleet without alarming Parliament with requests for new ships. In reality, many of these rebuilds amounted to just that, with little or no timber from the original ship surviving into her rebuilt form. In some cases, ships would be dismantled years before they actually underwent the rebuilding process, but remained on the active list for the entire time. Rebuilding a ship was a lengthy process, more time-consuming and more expensive than building a completely new one. The pressures of the war meant that for drydocks to be taken up for long periods of time whilst a ship was surveyed to determine what timber was reusable in the new ship, and what could find a use elsewhere in the dockyard, disassembled and then rebuilt was counter-productive. Ships intended to be sent to the West Indies for service in the war required the use of drydocks to have their hulls appropriately sheathed to combat such problems as shipworm, and other uses of the drydocks for servicing the fleet meant that rebuilds were given a low priority. It was at this time that the British practice of converting old ships to hulks for expanded storage space in harbours began, as instead of wasting effort and dockyard space on breaking up an old vessel that was still perfectly capable of floating, they were converted to serve the dockyards in this new capacity. Few rebuilds were started after 1739, and none at all were begun after 1742, although any that had been started were allowed to complete.

== Individual ship types ==
A different set of Establishment dimensions was defined for each size of ship, other than the smallest (i.e. the unrated) vessels.

=== First rates of 100 guns ===
General characteristics for 100-gun first rates
- Type: 100-gun first-rate ship of the line
- Tons burthen: 1869 42/94 bm
- Length: 174 ft 0 in (53.0 m) (gundeck); 140 ft 7 in (42.8 m) (keel)
- Beam: 50 ft 0 in (15.2 m)
- Depth of hold: 20 ft 0 in (6.1 m)
- Complement: 850 officers and men
- Armament: 100 guns: Lower deck: 28 × 42 or 32-pounders; Middle deck: 28 × 24-pounders; Upper deck: 28 × 12-pounders; Quarter deck: 12 × 6-pounders; Forecastle: 4 × 6-pounders

The 1719 Establishment for first rates took as its model the highly successful Royal Sovereign as rebuilt in 1704 (the subsequent Royal William and Britannia rebuildings had been to the same design dimensions and set of scantlings when they were launched in 1719). Thus all three of these rebuildings should be taken as being "to the 1719 Establishment" even though they actually predated that standard.

While no other first rates were built or rebuilt during the years between 1719 and 1733, the Royal Sovereign underwent a further rebuilding between 1723 and 1729.

The 1733 revision made no changes to the tonnage, length or breadth of the first rate, and only increased the depth in hold by 6 inches. The 1741 revision substantively increased the dimensions to:

- Tons burthen: 1999 70/94 bm
- Length:
  - 178 ft 0 in (54.3 m) (gundeck)
  - 144 ft 6.5 in (44.1 m) (keel)
- Beam: 51 ft 0 in (15.5 m)
- Depth in hold: 21 ft 6 in (6.6 m)

Only one first rate was built to the 1733 dimensions. The Victory was nominally a rebuilding of its predecessor of 1695, but this was strictly a legal fiction, as the old ship had been completely taken to pieces in 1721, and the new ship was not commenced until 1733. Following this ship, no first rate at all was built to the 1741 dimensions.

=== Second rates of 90 guns ===
General characteristics for 90-gun second rates
- Type: 90-gun second-rate ship of the line
- Tons burthen: 1566 89/94 bm
- Length: 164 ft 0 in (50.0 m) (gundeck); 132 ft 5 in (40.4 m) (keel)
- Beam: 47 ft 2 in (14.4 m)
- Depth of hold: 18 ft 10 in (5.7 m)
- Complement: 750 officers and men
- Armament: 90 guns: Lower deck: 26 × 32-pounders; Middle deck: 26 × 18-pounders; Upper deck: 26 × 9-pounders (12-pounders from 1743); Quarter deck: 10 × 6-pounders; Forecastle: 2 × 6-pounders

The 1719 Establishment revised the dimensions of these ships from the 1706 Establishment dimensions to those shown in the adjacent table. Five Second Rates were rebuilt from existing ships to this Establishment specification – the Prince George in 1719–1723, the Union in 1718–1726, the Namur in 1723–1729, the Neptune in 1725–1730, and the Marlborough in 1725–1732. Two more were ordered to be rebuilt to this Establishment, but were actually completed to the revised 1733 dimensions.

The 1733 revision increased the dimensions as follows:

- Tons burthen: 1626 15/94 bm
- Length:
  - 166 ft 0 in (50.6 m) (gundeck)
  - 134 ft 1 in (40.9 m) (keel)
- Beam: 47 ft 9 in (14.6 m)
- Depth in hold: 19 ft 6 in (5.9 m)

Two second rates were rebuilt to the 1733 dimensions, although initially ordered to the original 1719 Establishment. The Vanguard was rebuilt in 1734–1739 and the Charles in 1739–1740. Again, two more were ordered to be rebuilt to these dimensions, but were actually completed to the revised 1741 dimensions.

The 1741 revision further increased the dimensions to:

- Tons burthen: 1678 92/94 bm
- Length:
  - 168 ft 0 in (51.2 m) (gundeck)
  - 137 ft 0 in (41.8 m) (keel)
- Beam: 48 ft 0 in (14.6 m)
- Depth in hold: 20 ft 2 in (6.1 m)

Two second rates were rebuilt to the 1741 dimensions, although initially ordered to the 1733 figures. The Ramillies was rebuilt in 1743–1749 and the Prince in 1743–1750.

=== Third rates of 80 guns ===
General characteristics for 80-gun third rates
- Type: 80-gun third-rate ship of the line
- Tons burthen: 1350 1/94 bm
- Length: 158 ft 0 in (48.2 m) (gundeck); 128 ft 2 in (39.1 m) (keel)
- Beam: 44 ft 6 in (13.6 m)
- Depth of hold: 18 ft 2 in (5.5 m)
- Complement: 520 officers and men (600 from 1733)
- Armament: 80 guns: (1743 armament in brackets); Lower deck: 26 × 32-pounders; Middle deck: 26 × 12-pounders (18-pounders from 1743); Upper deck: 24 × 6-pounders (9-pounders from 1743); Quarter deck: 4 × 6-pounders

The 1719 Establishment revised the dimensions of these ships (the smallest class of three-decker warships) as shown in the adjacent table. Seven 80-gun ships were rebuilt to this specification before 1733 – the Lancaster in 1719–1722, Norfolk in 1718–1728, Cornwall in 1723–1726, Ranelagh in 1724–1731, Humber in 1723–1726, Somerset in 1722(?)-1731 and Russell in 1729–1735. An eighth ship – the Cumberland – was completed to the 1733 dimensions. The Humber was renamed Princess Amelia in 1727 and was cut down a deck into a 66-gun ship in 1747–1748.

The 1733 revision increased the dimensions as follows:

- Tons burthen: 1400 67/94 bm
- Length:
  - 158 ft 0 in (48.2 m) (gundeck)
  - 127 ft 8 in (38.9 m) (keel)
- Beam: 45 ft 5 in (13.8 m)
- Depth in hold: 18 ft 7 in (5.7 m)

Two 80-gun ships were rebuilt to these dimensions – the Boyne in 1736–1739 and Cumberland in 1734–1739. The Cumberland was cut down a deck into a 66-gun ship in 1747–1748.

The 1741 revision further increased the dimensions to:

- Tons burthen: 1472 53/94 bm
- Length:
  - 161 ft 0 in (49.1 m) (gundeck)
  - 130 ft 10 in (39.9 m) (keel)
- Beam: 46 ft 0 in (14.0 m)
- Depth in hold: 19 ft 4 in (5.9 m)

One ship (Culloden) was built to the 1741 dimensions for 80-gun ships, but during construction was cut down a deck and completed in 1747 as a 74-gun two-decker ship with the following armament:

- Lower deck: 28 × 32-pounders
- Upper deck: 28 × 18-pounders
- Quarter deck: 14 × 9-pounders
- Forecastle: 4 × 9-pounders

Two ships (Devonshire and Lancaster) were built to the 1741 dimensions for 80-gun ships, but during construction were each cut down a deck and completed as 66-gun two-decker ships, each with the following armament:

- Lower deck: 26 × 32-pounders
- Upper deck: 26 × 18-pounders
- Quarter deck: 10 × 9-pounders
- Forecastle: 4 × 9-pounders

=== Third rates of 70 (later 64) guns ===
General characteristics for 70-gun third rates
- Type: 70-gun third-rate ship of the line
- Tons burthen: 1128 9/94 bm
- Length: 151 ft 0 in (46.0 m) (gundeck); 123 ft 2 in (37.5 m) (keel)
- Beam: 41 ft 6 in (12.6 m)
- Depth of hold: 17 ft 4 in (5.3 m)
- Complement: 440 officers and men (480 from 1733)
- Armament: 70 guns (64 guns from 1743): Lower deck: 26 × 24-pounders (32-pounders from 1743); Upper deck: 26 × 12-pounders (18-pounders from 1743); Quarter deck: 14 × 6-pounders (10 × 9-pounders from 1743); Forecastle: 4 × 6-pounders (2 × 9-pounders from 1743)

The 1719 Establishment revised the dimensions of these ships as shown in the adjacent table. Eight 70-gun ships were rebuilt in 1717–1730 to these specifications – the Edinburgh, Northumberland, Captain, Stirling Castle, Lenox, Kent, Grafton and Ipswich – while four more were newbuilt, all at Deptford Dockyard – Burford, Berwick, Buckingham, Prince of Orange (the last originally to have been named Bredah).

The 1733 revision increased the dimensions as follows:

- Tons burthen: 1223 23/94 bm
- Length:
  - 151 ft 0 in (46.0 m) (gundeck)
  - 122 ft 0 in (37.2 m) (keel)
- Beam: 43 ft 5 in (13.2 m)
- Depth in hold: 17 ft 9 in (5.4 m)

Another twelve 70-gun ships were built or rebuilt to the 1733 dimensions – the Elizabeth, Suffolk, Essex, Prince Frederick, Nassau, Bedford, Royal Oak, Revenge, Stirling Castle, Captain, Monmouth and Berwick.

The 1741 revision further increased the dimensions to:

- Tons burthen: 1291 49/94 bm
- Length: 154 ft 0 in (46.9 m) (gundeck)
  125 ft 5 in (38.2 m) (keel)
- Beam: 44 ft 0 in (13.4 m)
- Depth in hold: 18 ft 11 in (5.8 m)

The 1743 Establishment of Guns altered these ships from 70-gun to 64-gun, but with more powerful ordnance as set out in the table.

=== Fourth rates of 60 (later 58) guns ===
General characteristics for 60-gun fourth rates
- Type: 60-gun fourth-rate ship of the line
- Tons burthen: 951 27/94 bm
- Length: 144 ft 0 in (43.9 m) (gundeck); 117 ft 7 in (35.8 m) (keel)
- Beam: 39 ft 0 in (11.9 m) (1719); 41 ft 5 in (12.6 m) (1733)
- Depth of hold: 16 ft 5 in (5.0 m) (1719); 16 ft 11 in (5.2 m) (1733)
- Complement: 365 officers and men (400 from 1733, 420 from 1743)
- Armament: 60 guns: Lower deck: 24 × 24-pounders; Upper deck: 26 × 9-pounders; Quarter deck: 8 × 6-pounders; Forecastle: 2 × 6-pounders

The 1719 Establishment revised the dimensions of these ships as shown in the adjacent table. Three 60-gun ships were rebuilt to this specification during the early 1720s – the Plymouth, Canterbury and Windsor – while the Dreadnought underwent a major repair amounting to a rebuild and a fifth ship – the Sunderland – was replaced by new construction. In the late 1720s, six new 60-gun ships were rebuilt to replace obsolete 50-gun ships – the Deptford, Pembroke, Tilbury, Warwick, Swallow and Centurion (the last-named to a somewhat broader specification), while the 60-gun Dunkirk was likewise rebuilt. A slightly lengthened ship – the Rippon – was built in 1730–1735.

The 1733 revision increased the dimensions as follows:

- Tons burthen: 1061 49/94 bm
- Length:
  - 144 ft 0 in (43.9 m) (gundeck)
  - 116 ft 4 in (35.5 m) (keel)
- Beam: 41 ft 5 in (12.6 m)
- Depth in hold: 16 ft 11 in (5.2 m)

Eleven vessels were initially built to this specification, including six built as replacements for obsolete 50-gun ships. These were the Weymouth, Worcester, Strafford, Superb, Jersey, Augusta, Dragon, Lion, Kingston, Rupert and Princess Mary. After 1739 another four were built – the Nottingham and Exeter in the Royal Dockyards and the Medway and Dreadnought by contract.

The 1741 revision further increased the dimensions to:

- Tons burthen: 1123 57/94 bm
- Length:
  - 147 ft 0 in (44.8 m) (gundeck)
  - 119 ft 9 in (36.5 m) (keel)
- Beam: 42 ft 0 in (12.8 m)
- Depth in hold: 18 ft 1 in (5.5 m)

Six ships were ordered to this specification – the Canterbury, Sunderland, Tilbury, Princess Louisa, Defiance and Eagle. A seventh – Windsor – was built to a somewhat enlarged design.

The 1743 Establishment of Guns replaced the 26 9-pounder guns on the upper deck by 24 12-pounder guns, reducing the vessel to a 58-gun ship.

=== Fourth rates of 50 guns ===
General characteristics for 50-gun fourth rates
- Type: 50-gun fourth-rate ship of the line
- Tons burthen: 755 89/94 bm
- Length: 134 ft 0 in (40.8 m) (gundeck); 109 ft 8 in (33.4 m) (keel)
- Beam: 36 ft 0 in (11.0 m)
- Depth of hold: 15 ft 2 in (4.6 m)
- Complement: 280 officers and men (300 from 1733)
- Armament: 50 guns: Lower deck: 22 × 18-pounders (24-pounders from 1743); Upper deck: 22 × 9-pounders (12-pounders from 1743); Quarter deck: 4 × 6-pounders; Forecastle: 2 × 6-pounders

The 1716 Establishment of Guns for the smaller fourth rates had replaced the 12-pounder guns on their lower deck by 18-pounders, and the 6-pounders on their upper decks by 9-pounders; at the same time, it removed four of the smaller (6-pounder) guns from the quarterdeck, turning them from 54 to 50 guns. The 1719 Establishment revised the dimensions of these ships as shown in the adjacent table.

Fourteen vessels were rebuilt to this specification between 1718 and 1732 – the Falkland, Chatham, Colchester, Leopard, Portland, Lichfield, Argyll, Assistance, Romney, Oxford, Greenwich, Falmouth, Salisbury and Newcastle.

The 1733 revision increased the dimensions as follows:

- Tons burthen: 853 44/94 bm
- Length:
  - 134 ft 0 in (40.8 m) (gundeck)
- 108 ft 3 in (33.0 m) (keel)
- Beam: 38 ft 6 in (11.7 m)
- Depth in hold: 15 ft 9 in (4.8 m)

Eight ships were rebuilt to this specification in the Royal Dockyards – the Gloucester, Severn, Saint Albans, Woolwich, Dartmouth, Guernsey, Antelope and Preston. Subsequently, four further vessels were newbuilt by commercial contract – the Hampshire, Leopard, Sutherland and Nonsuch.

The 1741 revision further increased the dimensions to:

- Tons burthen: 968 8/94 bm
- Length:
  - 140 ft 0 in (42.7 m) (gundeck)
  - 113 ft 9 in (34.7 m) (keel)
- Beam: 40 ft 0 in (12.2 m)
- Depth in hold: 17 ft 2.5 in (5.2 m)

Fourteen vessels were newbuilt by contract to a common design by the Surveyor's Office – the Harwich, Colchester, Falkland, Chester, Winchester, Portland, Maidstone, Gloucester, Norwich, Ruby, Advice, Salisbury. Lichfield and a second Colchester (after the first was lost in 1744). A fifteenth vessel – Panther – was built to a local design at Plymouth Dockyard, and two others were also dockyard-built at Woolwich and Deptford to a lengthened design – the Bristol and Rochester.

=== Fifth rates of 40 guns ===
General characteristics for 40-gun fifth rates
- Type: 40-gun fifth-rate
- Tons burthen: 594 55/94 bm
- Length: 124 ft 0 in (37.8 m) (gundeck); 101 ft 8 in (31.0 m) (keel)
- Beam: 33 ft 2 in (10.1 m)
- Depth of hold: 14 ft 0 in (4.3 m)
- Complement: 190 officers and men (250 from 1733)
- Armament: 40 guns (44 guns from 1743): Lower deck: 20 × 12-pounders (18-pounders from 1743); Upper deck: 20 × 6-pounders (9-pounders from 1733); Quarter deck (from 1743): 4 × 6-pounders

The 1716 Establishment of Guns for the larger fifth rates had removed the four smaller guns from the quarterdeck and instead added a tenth pair of guns on the lower deck, turning them from 42 to 40 guns. However the lower deck guns were now 12-pounders instead of the former 9-pounders. Thirteen vessels were rebuilt to this specification – the Hector, Anglesea, Diamond, Mary Galley, Ludlow Castle, Pearl, Kinsale, Lark, Adventure, Roebuck, Torrington, Princess Louisa and Southsea Castle.

The 1733 revision made no change to the gundeck length of the 40-gun fifth rate, and actually reduced the keel length by 17 inches. It substantially increased the beam by 26 inches and the depth in hold by 6 inches as follows:

- Tons burthen: 678 33/94 bm
- Length:
  - 123 ft 0 in (37.5 m) (gundeck)
  - 100 ft 3 in (30.6 m) (keel)
- Beam: 35 ft 8 in (10.9 m)
- Depth in hold: 14 ft 6 in (4.4 m)

A prototype to this specification – the Eltham – was rebuilt in 1734–1736 at Deptford. Thirteen more ships were ordered from commercial contractors from 1739 onwards – the Dover, Folkestone, Faversham, Lynn, Gosport, Sapphire, Hastings, Liverpool, Kinsale, Adventure, Diamond, Launceston and Looe.

By the late 1730s it was evident to Admiralty that the 44-gun fifth rates were inferior vessels; too small to stand in the line of battle but too large and slow for general cruising. To address some these defects the 1741 revision further increased the standard dimensions, to:

- Tons burthen: 706 36/94 bm
- Length:
  - 126 ft 0 in (38.4 m) (gundeck)
  - 102 ft 6 in (31.2 m) (keel)
- Beam: 36 ft 0 in (11.0 m)
- Depth in hold: 15 ft 5.5 in (4.7 m)

Thirteen ships were built to these specifications, again all by contract – the Anglesea, Torrington, Hector, Rosebuck, Larke, Pearl, Mary Galley, Ludlow Castle, Fowey, Looe, Poole, Southsea Castle and Chesterfield. Three further ships followed a slightly amended design, with the depth in hold increased by a further 5 inches – the Prince Edward, another Anglesea and Thetis.

=== Fifth rates of 30 guns ===
The 1719 Establishment made provision for a 30-gun fifth rate with a gundeck length of 114 feet, carrying (under the provisions of the 1716 Establishment of Guns) an armament of eight 9-pounders on the lower deck, twenty 6-pounders on the upper deck, and two 4-pounders on the quarterdeck, but no 30-gun ships were built to this Establishment and this obsolete type was soon to disappear.

=== Sixth rates of 20 guns ===
General characteristics for 20-gun sixth rates
- Type: 20-gun sixth-rate
- Tons burthen: 374 49/94 bm
- Length: 106 ft 0 in (32.3 m) (gundeck); 87 ft 9 in (26.7 m) (keel)
- Beam: 28 ft 4 in (8.6 m)
- Depth of hold: 9 ft 2 in (2.8 m)
- Complement: 140 officers and men
- Armament: 20 guns: Upper deck: 20 × 6-pounders

The 1719 Establishment for sixth rates took as its model the highly successful Dursley Galley built in 1719. It revised the dimensions of these ships from the 1706 Establishment dimensions to those shown in the adjacent table. Three sixth rates were newbuilt – the Greyhound and Blandford as replacements in 1720 for lost vessels, and the Rye as replacement in 1727 for a discarded ship – and seventeen others were rebuilt from existing ships to this Establishment specification – the Lyme and Shoreham in 1720, Scarborough in 1722, Lowestoffe in 1723, Garland, Seaford and Rose in 1724, Deal Castle, Fox, Gibraltar, Bideford, Seahorse, Squirrel, Aldborough, Flamborough and Experiment in 1727, and Phoenix in 1728. Two further 20-gun ships were rebuilt at Deptford to a slightly enlarged specification in 1732 – the Sheerness and Dolphin – with the beam increased to 30 ft 5in.

The 1733 revision made no change to the gundeck length of the 20-gun sixth rate, and actually reduced the keel length by 9 inches. It substantially increased the beam by 26 inches from the 1719 dimensions and the depth in hold by 3 inches as follows:

- Tons burthen: 430 46/94 bm
- Length:
  - 106 ft 0 in (32.3 m) (gundeck)
  - 87 ft 0 in (26.5 m) (keel)
- Beam: 30 ft 6 in (9.3 m)
- Depth in hold: 9 ft 5 in (2.9 m)

Two 20-gun ships were rebuilt at Deptford to the 1733 dimensions – the Tartar in 1734 and the Kennington in 1736. In 1739–1740 another fourteen were ordered to be newbuilt by commercial contractors to a common design – the Fox, Winchelsea, Lyme, Rye, Experiment, Lively, Port Mahon, Scarborough, Success, Rose, Bideford, Bridgewater, Seaford and Solebay. Two further vessels to a slightly enlarged design – the Greyhound and Blandford – were also built by contract in 1741.

The 1741 revision further increased the dimensions to:

- Tons burthen: 498 36/94 bm
- Length:
  - 112 ft 0 in (34.1 m) (gundeck)
  - 91 ft 6 in (27.9 m) (keel)
- Beam: 32 ft 0 in (9.8 m)
- Depth in hold: 11 ft 0 in (3.4 m)

Fifteen ships were built, all by contract, to a common design and to these specifications – the Lowestoffe, Aldborough, Alderney, Phoenix, Sheerness, Wager, Shoreham, Bridgewater, Glasgow, Triton, Mercury, Surprise, Siren, Fox and Rye. Again, two further vessels – Centaur and Deal Castle – were built to a slightly different design (without lower deck gun ports) while still meeting the same 1741 Establishment criteria, while a single vessel – the Garland – was built in 1745–1748 at Sheerness Dockyard to a somewhat longer design.
