= Thomas Durell =

British naval officer (1685–1741)

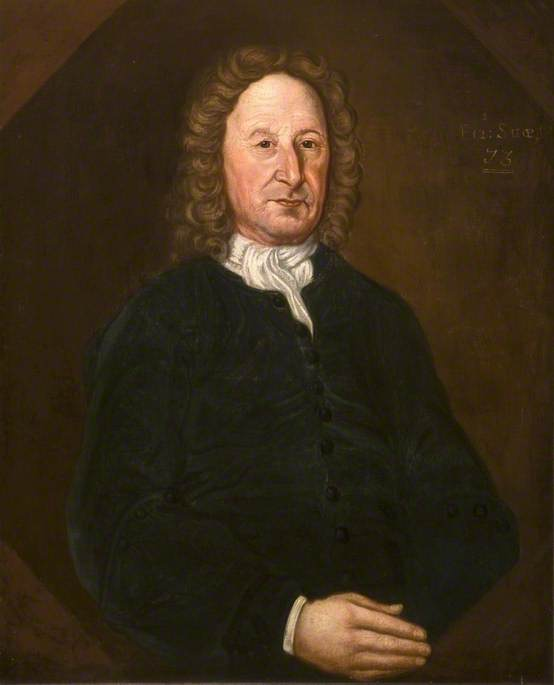
- Portrait of Durell
- Born: 1685; St Helier, Jersey
- Died: August 23, 1741 (aged 55–56); Off Spithead, English Channel
- Relatives: Vice-Admiral Philip Durell (nephew); Captain Philip Saumarez (nephew); Admiral Thomas Dumaresq (cousin); Elias Dumaresq, 3rd Seigneur of Augrès (grandfather)
- Military career
- Allegiance: England; Great Britain
- Branch: Royal Navy
- Service years: 1697–1741
- Rank: Captain
- Commands: HMS Speedwell; HMS Seahorse; HMS Kent; HMS Exeter; HMS Scarborough; HMS Strafford; HMS Sunderland; HMS Elizabeth
- Conflicts: War of the Spanish Succession; War of Jenkins' Ear; War of the Austrian Succession; Action of 8 April 1740

Captain Thomas Durell (1685 – 23 August 1741) was a Royal Navy officer most famous for his role in the capture of the Spanish ship Princesa at the action of 8 April 1740.

== Early life ==
Thomas Durell was born in 1685 to John Durell, who was the Lieutenant-Bailiff of Jersey and Ann Dumaresq, who was the daughter of Elias Dumaresq, 3rd Seigneur of Augrès.

== Early career ==
Durell joined the Royal Navy in 1697 and was promoted to lieutenant in 1705 after passing the lieutenant's examination. He was promoted to commander in 1716 and was later given command of the 42-gun HMS Speedwell. He was promoted to captain in 1720.

== Nova Scotia ==
After the Peace of Utrecht, which ended the War of the Spanish Succession, the British gained control of part of the Acadian lands in modern-day Nova Scotia.

Durell who was in command of HMS Seahorse under the orders of General Richard Philipps, who was the Governor of Nova Scotia, surveyed the coasts and harbours of the newly acquired colony. This service was vital to the British governors; Durell's surveys were later used to create maps of Nova Scotia and the greater area.

For Durell's services there is an island named in his honour near Canso, Nova Scotia named Durell's Island.

== Capture of Princesa ==
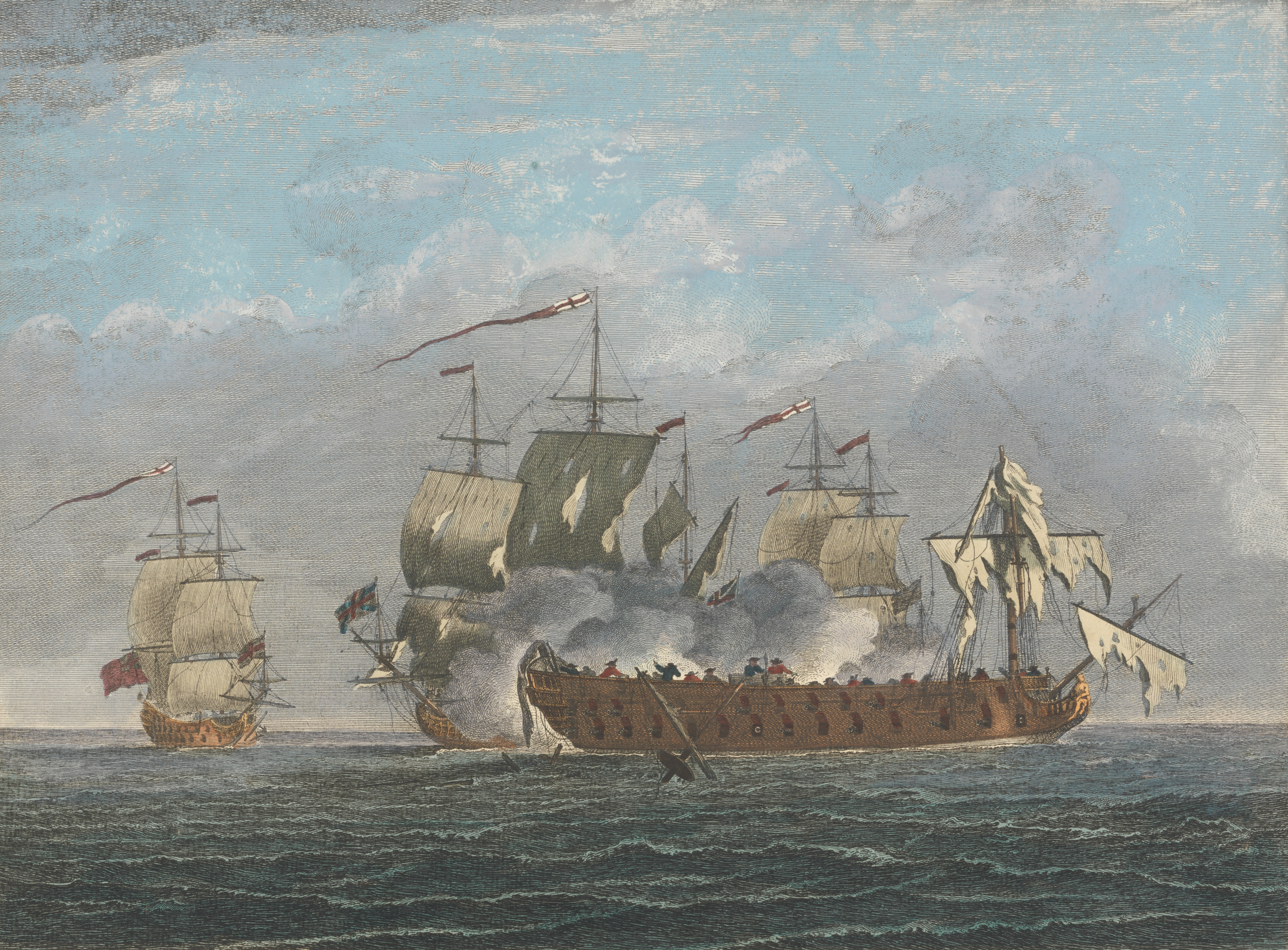
The action of 8 April 1740

During the War of Austrian Succession, Durell took part in the action of 8 April 1740. Durell, who commanded HMS Kent, fought alongside Captain Covill Mayne who commanded HMS Lenox and Captain Lord Augustus Fitzroy who commanded HMS Orford. Together the ships fought at close range with the Spanish man of war Princesa, which was captured and became HMS Princess. During the battle Durell injured his hand.
