= Gibraltar Group =

Class overview
- Name: Gibraltar Group
- Builders: Woolwich Dockyard
- Operators: Royal Navy
- Preceded by: Flamborough Group
- Succeeded by: 1719 Establishment Group
- Built: 1710–1716
- In service: 1706–1748
- Completed: 12
- Lost: 3
- Retired: 9

General characteristics
- Type: 24-gun sixth rate
- Tons burthen: 276 bm
- Length: 94 ft 0 in (28.7 m) gundeck; 76 ft 9 in (23.4 m) keel for tonnage
- Beam: 26 ft 0 in (7.9 m) for tonnage
- Depth of hold: 10 ft 8 in (3.3 m)
- Sail plan: ship-rigged
- Armament: 20 × 6-pdr 19 cwt guns on wooden trucks (UD); 4 × 4-pdr 12 cwt guns on wooden trucks (QD)

The Gibraltar Group of sixth rates were basically repeats of the Maidstone Group. Ten ships were ordered with one of a slightly different design (but basically the same) and another added in 1711, for a total of twelve vessels. Their armament was similar as were the dimensions of the vessels. They were constructed between 1710 and 1716.

== Design and specifications ==
The construction of the vessels was assigned to Royal dockyards. As with most vessels of this time period only order and launch dates are available. The dimensional data listed here is the specification data and the acceptable design creep will be listed on each individual vessel. The gundeck was 94 feet 0 inches (28.7 metres) with a keel length of 76 feet 9 inches (23.4 metres) for tonnage calculation. The breadth would be 26 feet 0 inches (7.9 metres) for tonnage with a depth of hold of 10 ft 8 in (3.3 m). The tonnage calculation would be 276 tons.

The gun armament as established in 1703 would be twenty 6-pounder 19 hundredweight (cwt) guns mounted on wooden trucks on the upper deck (UD) with four 4-pounder 12 cwt guns on the quarterdeck (QD). The 4-pounders would be removed in 1714.

== Ships of the Gibraltar Group ==
Name	Builder	Launch date	Remarks
Solebay (1711)	Portsmouth Dockyard	21 August 1711	sold 23 June 1748
Gibraltar (1711)	Deptford Dockyard	18 October 1711	dismantled at Deptford for rebuilding
Port Mahon (1711)	Deptford Dockyard	18 October 1711	Broken at Plymouth May 1740
Blandford (1711)	Woolwich Dockyard	29 October 1711	Foundered in North Sea with all hands 23 March 1719
Hind (1712)	Woolwich Dockyard	31 January 1712	Wrecked off Guernsey 7 December 1721
Seahorse (1712)	Portsmouth Dockyard	13 February 1712	dismantled at Deptford for rebuilding
Rose (1712)	Chatham Dockyard	24 April 1712	dismantled at Woolwich for rebuilding
Bideford (1712)	Deptford Dockyard	14 March 1712	dismantled at Deptford for rebuilding
Success (1712)	Portsmouth Dockyard	30 April 1712	Sold Plymouth 22 July 1743
Greyhound (1712)	Woolwich Dockyard	21 June 1712	Taken by Spanish 5 September 1718, retaken 16 September 1719 and burnt
Lively (1713)	Plymouth Dockyard	28 May 1713	Broken at Portsmouth completed in December 1738
Speedwell (1716)	Deptford Dockyard	23 March 1716	Wrecked on Dutch coast 21 November 1720
