= Lord Augustus FitzRoy =

Royal Navy officer (1716–1741)

Captain Lord Augustus FitzRoy
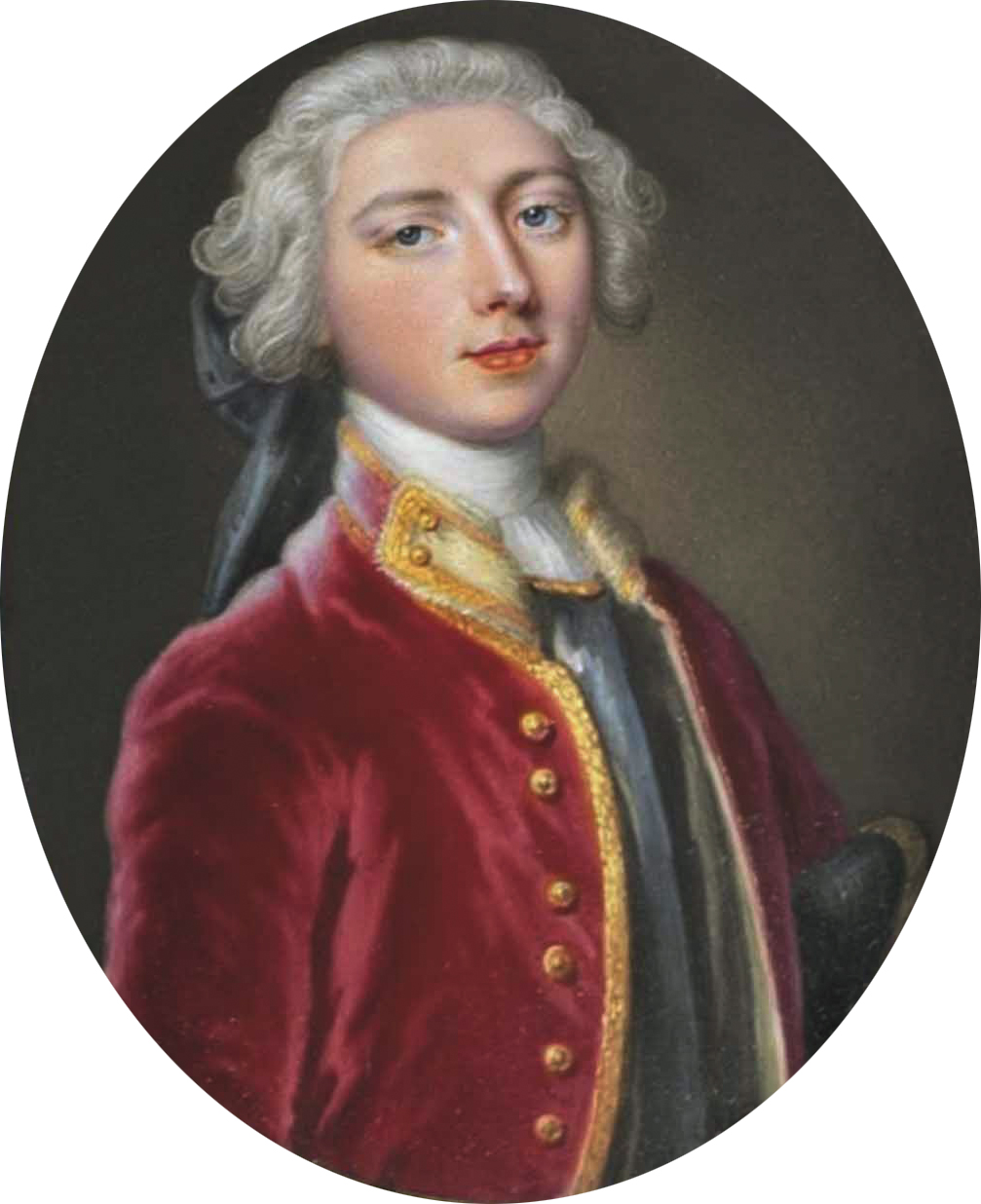
- Portrait of Fitzroy by Christian Friedrich Zincke
- Born: 16 October 1716; England
- Died: 24 May 1741 (aged 24); Jamaica
- Relatives: Charles FitzRoy, 2nd Duke of Grafton (father); Augustus FitzRoy, 3rd Duke of Grafton (son); Charles FitzRoy, 1st Baron Southampton (son)
- Military career
- Allegiance: Great Britain
- Branch: Royal Navy
- Service years: – 1741
- Rank: Captain
- Commands: HMS Eltham; HMS Orford
- Conflicts: War of the Austrian Succession; Battle of Cartagena de Indias

Captain Lord Augustus FitzRoy (16 October 1716 – 24 May 1741) was a Royal Navy officer. He served during the War of the Austrian Succession, and was involved in the capture of the Spanish ship of the line, Princesa, a major prize in the war. He was also the father of Augustus FitzRoy, 3rd Duke of Grafton, who became Prime Minister of Great Britain.

== Early life ==
Lord Augustus FitzRoy was born in England, the third son of Charles FitzRoy, 2nd Duke of Grafton and Henrietta Somerset. His grandfather, Henry FitzRoy, 1st Duke of Grafton, was the natural son of King Charles II. Lord Augustus was educated at Eton College in 1728.

== Early naval service and love life ==
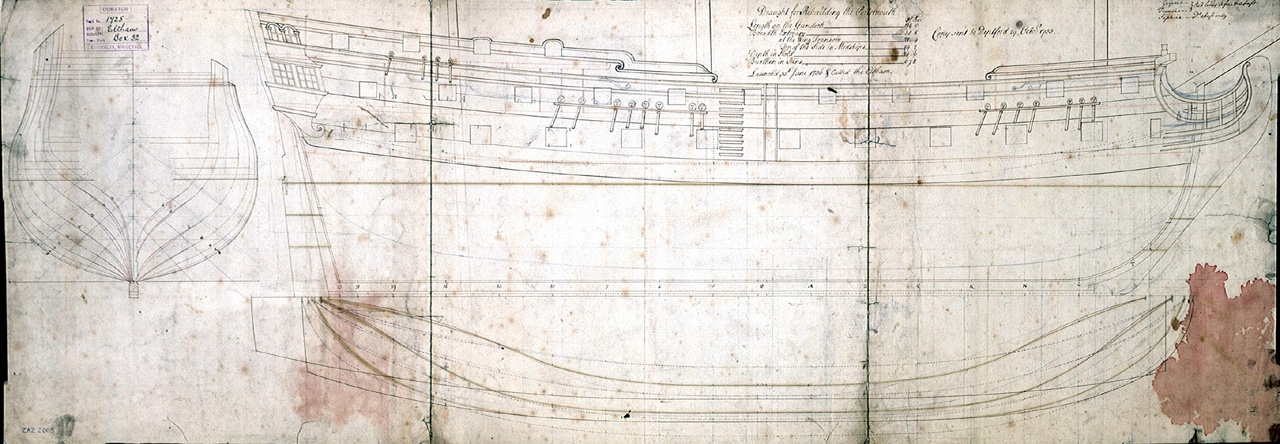
HMS Eltham

FitzRoy served in the Royal Navy and had risen to the rank of lieutenant by 1734. He was commissioned as a captain in 1736. In 1733 he was stationed in the North Atlantic, and in a visit to New York City, by virtue of his high birth, he was welcomed by the Governor of New York, William Cosby. He also met the Governor's daughter, Elizabeth, who married Lord Augustus in March 1734. Despite being married, he was still apparently of a "very amorous disposition", as his biographer, John Charnock wrote. He had earlier contracted a marriage at the age of 17, which his father, the Duke, had refused to recognize. Acknowledging him as a "brave and gallant young man", Charnock nonetheless admitted that FitzRoy had apparently told his wife "the night before he left her to go to sea that he had received with much transport a letter" from Sir William Morice's wife "that she would lie with him the following night and go to sea with him". This the couple apparently did, as they were discovered in flagrante delicto at an inn on the road to the harbour where FitzRoy's ship was anchored. Lady Morice was apprehended but escaped to France, while Sir William sued FitzRoy, obtaining £5,000 in damages and a divorce. FitzRoy's father, the Duke, shocked by his son's actions, promised his daughter-in-law "that he would be kind to her and never let her want while he lived."

FitzRoy's first command was the 40-gun fifth-rate HMS Eltham. He was appointed captain of the Eltham on 2 November 1736, and held this command until November 1739. Eltham was a part of George Clinton's squadron in the Mediterranean as part of the buildup of forces during the War of Jenkins' Ear. Due to increased hostilities, Nicholas Haddock was appointed Commander-in-Chief of the Mediterranean squadron, reinforcing it with more ships. Lord Augustus FitzRoy was, in September 1739, sent by Haddock to

reconnoitre Carthagena and Barcelona the latter being the port at which any troops destined for the enterprise would collect as they had on previous occasions with orders to bring back a report as to the possibility of executing an attack upon either the squadron or the shipping by means of fireships and bomb-vessels. Lord Augustus, who returned in the middle of October, reported that the enterprise was impracticable in view of the strong defences of the harbours.

== Political life ==
FitzRoy became Member of Parliament for Thetford on 10 February 1739 in a by-election. The constituency was one of those largely controlled by his father. His naval duties sometimes kept him away from parliament, such as during the division on the Spanish convention in March 1739, but voted with the Government against the place bill in January 1740.

== Command of Orford ==
In October/November 1739, Lord Augustus FitzRoy was appointed captain of the 70-gun third-rate HMS Orford. On 26 October 1740, a fleet of some 30 ships sailed from England under Admiral Sir Chaloner Ogle to support Admiral Edward Vernon in the West Indies against Spain. HMS Orford, commanded by Captain Lord Augustus FitzRoy, was a part of this fleet.

There were three notable incidents on this journey and subsequent patrols involving FitzRoy: the capture of a French prize, the attack on a French convoy, and the capture of the Spanish warship Princesa. On the first instance "On Saturday the 8th [November], the Orford gave chase to a vessel plying to the eastward, and brought her into the fleet under French colours." The second

...the admiral proceeded on his voyage, with fair weather ... till the afternoon of Wednesday, January the 7th, when they descried five large ships towards the shore. The admiral immediately made signal for the Orford, the Prince Frederick, the Weymouth, the Dunkirk, and the York, to give chase, while he and the fleet continued their course for Jamaica. They accordingly came up with the five ships, which were French men of war; and Lord Augustus FitzRoy, who commanded the Orford, ordered their commodore to hoist out his boat and come aboard. This order the French captain refusing to obey, his lordship gave him a broadside, and a very obstinate engagement ensued.

The engagement ended in the morning, when the English pretended they had mistaken the French for Spanish. Both forces sailed on their way. The third incident involving Fitzroy was the capture of the Spanish ship, Princesa.

=== Capture of Princesa ===
On 18 April 1740, Orford, HMS Kent and HMS Lenox were sailing off the coast of Cape Finisterre. They encountered the Spanish ship Princesa. The three English ships were all 70-gun third-rate ships of the line, and the Princesa was a 74-gun third rate, but according to the sources, only carried 64 guns. Princesa was very strongly built and withstood much of the attack for several hours. After about five or six hours, and considerable damage, the Spanish commander, Don Parlo Augustino de Gera, surrendered. As Orford was the closest English ship, FitzRoy was the first captain to reach the prize, and so accepted the surrender. This caused some consternation, particularly with Mayne, the commander of Lenox, as Lenox had been heavily involved in the fighting. "The prize, rated as a 70, continued for some years as one of the best two-deckers in the British Navy"

=== Siege of Cartagena ===
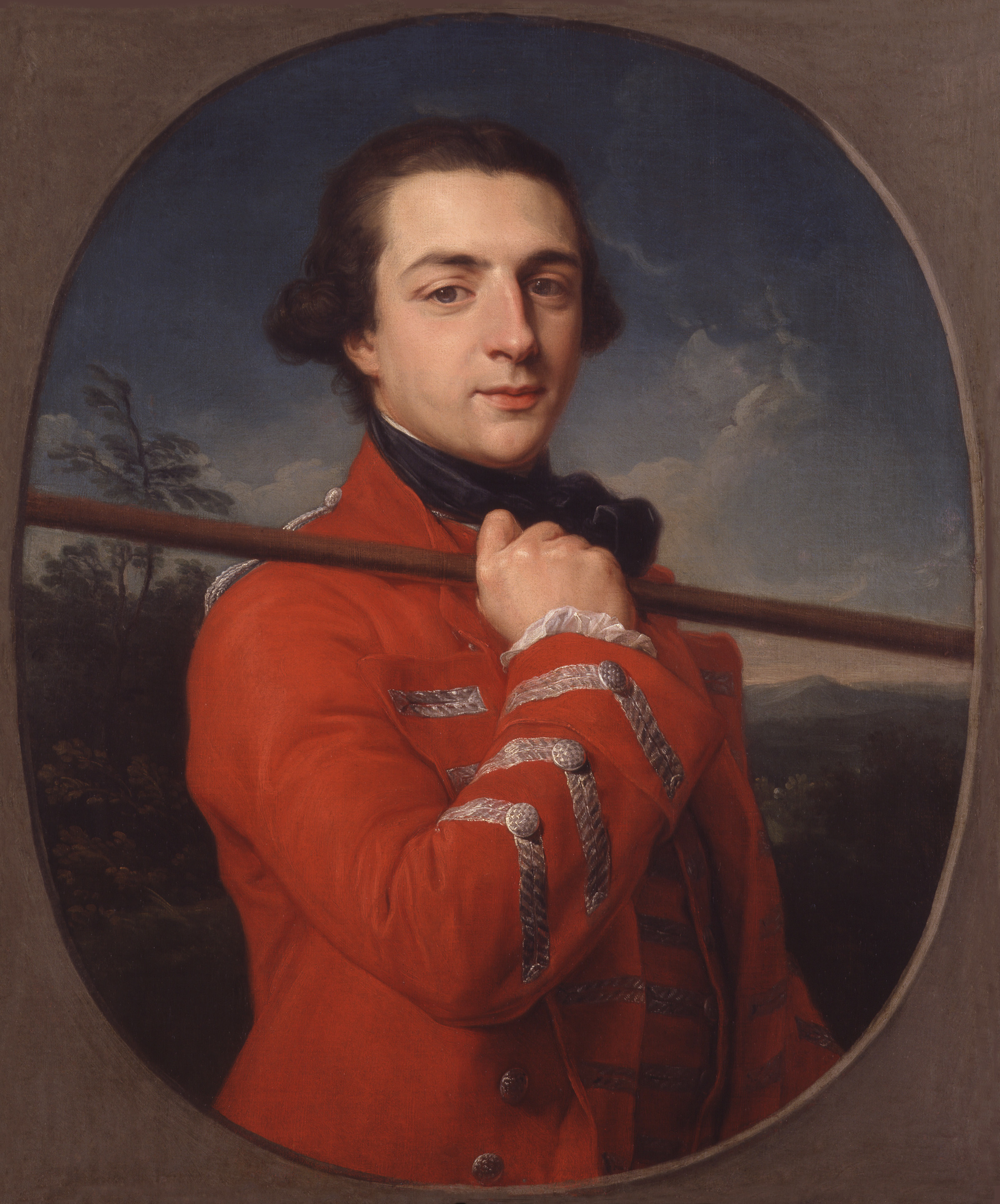
Portrait of the Duke of Grafton (Pompeo Batoni, 1762)

Orford, under FitzRoy, sailed to Cartagena as part of the fleet under Admiral Vernon. Orford had only a minor recorded role, in helping blockade the inner harbour of Surgidero. FitzRoy wrote a letter to the Duke of Richmond, dated 25 April 1741, regarding the failed attack on Fort San Lazare.

== Marriage and family ==
Captain Lord Augustus FitzRoy met Elizabeth Cosby in 1733, when he visited New York. Her father, William Cosby, was the Governor of New York, and had welcomed Augustus to the city. They were married in March 1734. They had two children:

- Augustus FitzRoy, 3rd Duke of Grafton (28 September 1735 – 14 March 1811)
- General Charles FitzRoy, 1st Baron Southampton (25 June 1737 – 21 March 1797)

== Death ==
Lord Augustus FitzRoy, like many officers serving in the West Indies at the time, suffered from the tropical fevers and diseases brought on by the poor living conditions and low health standards. The much-reduced fleet returned from Cartagena to Jamaica on 19 May 1741, and FitzRoy died several days later, on 24 May 1741.

== Notes ==
Parliament of Great Britain
Preceded by Charles FitzRoy-Scudamore; Sir Edmund Bacon	Member of Parliament for Thetford; 1739–1741; With: Charles FitzRoy-Scudamore	Succeeded by Charles FitzRoy-Scudamore; Lord Henry Beauclerk
