= Action of 8 April 1740 =

- Part of the War of Jenkins' Ear
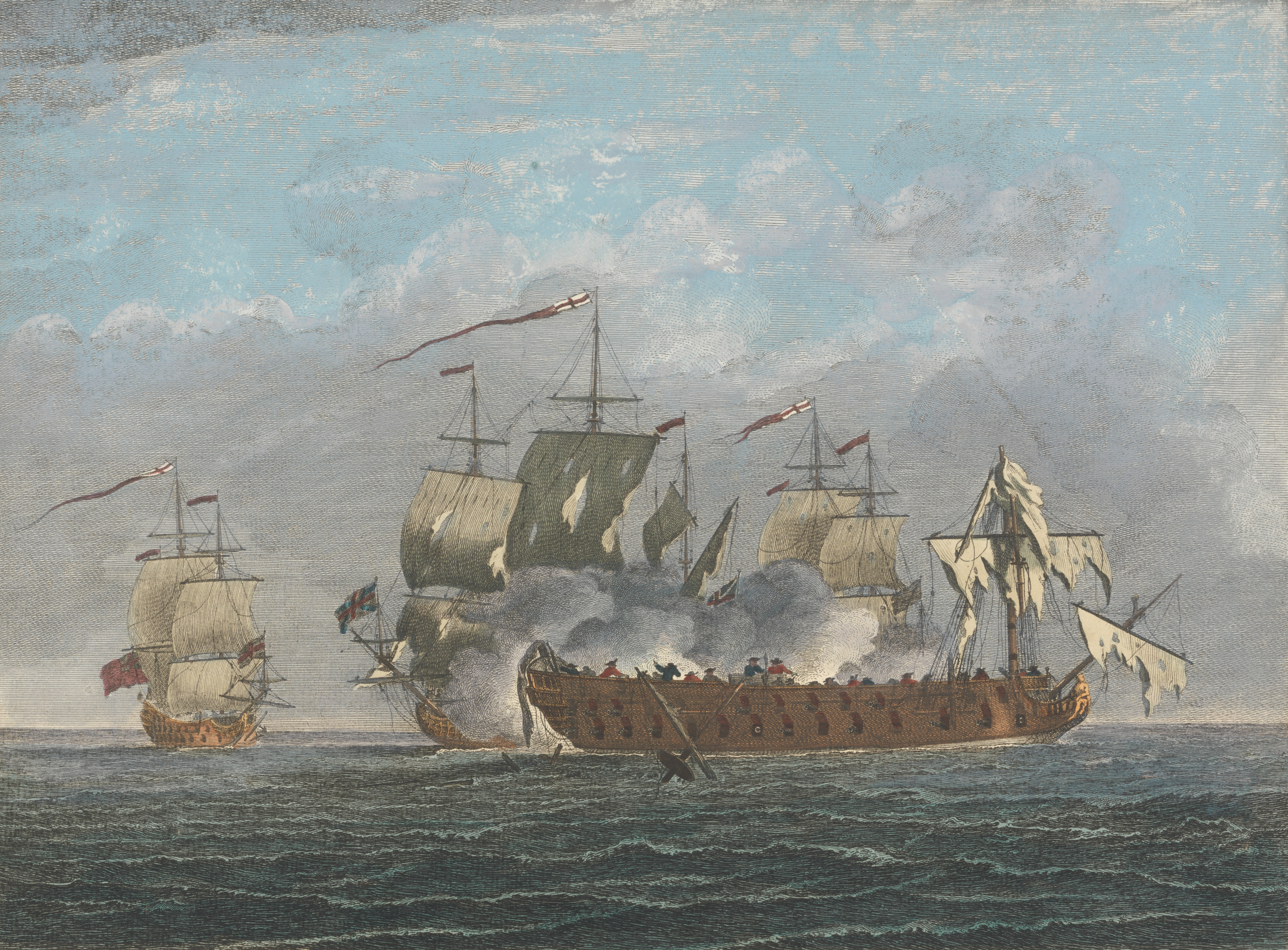
- Engraving of a painting of the action by Peter Monamy
Date	8 April 1740
Location	300 miles south-west of The Lizard, Atlantic Ocean
Result	British victory

Belligerents
Britain	Spain

Commanders and leaders
Colvill Mayne; Thomas Durell; Lord Augustus FitzRoy	Pablo Augustín de Gera (surrendered)

Strength
3 ships of the line	1 ship of the line

Casualties and losses
17 killed 40 wounded	33 killed 100 wounded 517 captured 1 ship of the line captured

The action of 8 April 1740 was a battle between the Spanish third rate Princesa (nominally rated at 70 guns, but carrying 64) under the command of Don Parlo Augustino de Gera, and a squadron consisting of three British 70-gun third rates; HMS Kent, HMS Lenox and HMS Orford, under the command of Captain Colvill Mayne of Lenox. The Spanish ship was chased down and captured by the three British ships, after which she was acquired for service by the Royal Navy.

== Background ==
On 25 March 1740 news reached the Admiralty that two Spanish ships had sailed from Buenos Aires, and were bound for Spain. Word was sent to Portsmouth and a squadron of three ships, consisting of the 70-gun ships HMS Kent, HMS Lenox and HMS Orford, under the command of Captain Colvill Mayne of Lenox, Captain Lord Augustus FitzRoy of the Orfond, and Captain Thomas Durell of the Kent. were prepared to intercept them. The ships, part of Sir John Balchen's fleet were briefly joined by HMS Rippon and HMS St Albans, and the squadron sailed from Portsmouth at 3am on 29 March, passing down the English Channel. Rippon and St Albans fell astern on 5 April, and though Mayne shortened sail, they did not come up. On 8 April Mayne's squadron was patrolling some 300 miles south-west of The Lizard when a ship was sighted to the north.

== Battle ==
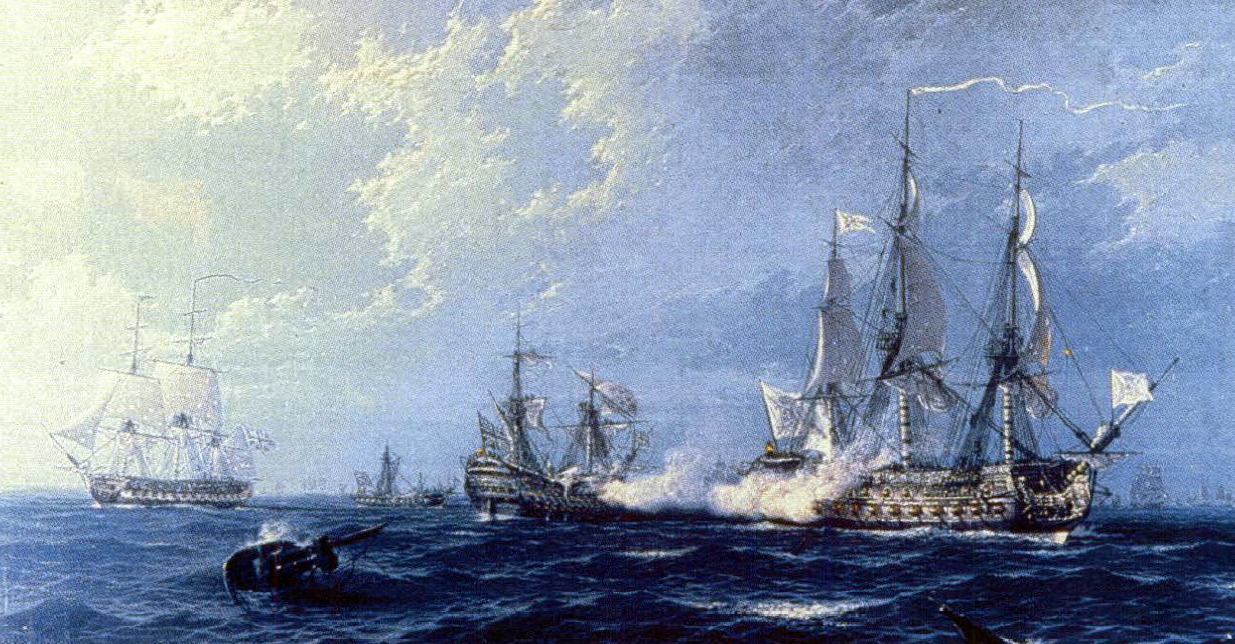
Painting of the battle by Ángel Cortellini Sánchez

The British came up and found her to be the Princesa, carrying 64 guns and a crew of 650 under the command of Don Pablo Augustín de Gera. They began to chase her at 10am, upon which she lowered the French colours she had been flying and hoisted Spanish ones. Mayne addressed his men saying 'When you received the pay of your country, you engaged yourselves to stand all dangers in her cause. Now is the trial; fight like men for you have no hope but in your courage.' After a two and half hour chase the British were able to come alongside and exchange broadsides, which eventually left the Spanish ship disabled. The British then raked her until she struck her colours. The Spanish ship had casualties of 33 killed and around 100 wounded, while eight men were killed aboard Kent, another eight aboard Orford, and another one aboard Lenox. Total British wounded amounted to 40, and included Captain Durell of Kent, who had one of his hands shot away.

== Aftermath ==
Princesa was brought into Portsmouth on 8 May 1740. An Admiralty order of 21 April 1741 authorised her purchase, and this was duly done on 14 July 1741 for the sum of £5,418.11.6¾d. After a great repair she was fitted at Portsmouth between July 1741 and March 1742, for a total sum of £36,007.2.10d. Her spirited resistance to three ships of equal rating attracted much comment. A contemporary description noted that she was larger than any British first rate and carried unusually large guns, many of them brass. She was described as the finest ship in the Spanish Navy, with her high build allowing her to open her lower gunports in conditions that meant that her opponents could not. She was renamed HMS Princess and served in the Royal Navy until she was finally sold for breaking up on 30 December 1784 at Portsmouth.
