= HMS Port Mahon (1711) =

Ship

History

Great Britain
- Name: HMS Port Mahon
- Ordered: 24 January 1711
- Builder: Royal Dockyard, Deptford
- Launched: 18 October 1711
- Commissioned: 1712
- Fate: Broken at Plymouth in May 1740

General characteristics
- Type: 24-gun Sixth Rate
- Tons burthen: 280 23/94 bm
- Length: 94 ft 0 in (28.7 m) gundeck; 76 ft 9 in (23.4 m) keel for tonnage
- Beam: 26 ft 0 in (7.9 m) for tonnage
- Depth of hold: 11 ft 7 in (3.5 m)
- Armament: 20 × 6-pdr 19 cwt guns on wooden trucks (UD); 4 × 4-pdr 12 cwt guns on wooden trucks (QD)

HMS Port Mahon was a member of the Gibraltar Group of 24-gun sixth rates. After commissioning she spent her career in home waters and North America on trade protection duties. She was broken up at Plymouth in May 1740.

Port Mahon was the first vessel of that name in the Royal Navy.

== Construction ==
She was ordered on 24 January 1711 from Deptford Dockyard to be built under the guidance of Joseph Allin the elder, Master Shipwright of Portsmouth. She was launched on 18 October 1711.

== Commissioned service ==
She was commissioned in 1712 under the command of Commander William Haddock (promoted to captain in January 1713) for service with Baker's Squadron on the Portuguese coast. In 1713 she was off Sale, Morocco. She returned to Portsmouth to undergo a great repair costing £524.0.4d1/4 (Note: A total cost accounting for inflation of approximately £98,900 in today's money.) from October 1714 to December 1715. In May 1716 she commissioned under the command of Captain William Smith, RN for service in the Baltic. She returned in the autumn of 1718 for a great repair at Deptford from December 1718 to March 1719/20 at a cost of £1,181.11.11d. (Note: A total cost accounting for inflation of approximately £211,000 in today's money.) She was commissioned in January 1720 under Captain James Luck followed by Captain Daniel Morris in September 1720 for service in the Baltic. In 1722 she was on quarantine guard in 1722 then the English Channel between 1724 and 1725 for anti-smuggling operations. She was refitted at Sheerness for £1,408.6.10d (Note: A total cost accounting for inflation of approximately £248,300 in today's money.) from September to November 1727. In November 1727 she was commissioned under Captain Christopher Pocklington for service on the Ireland station. She was paid off in November 1731. In 1732 She was under Captain Samuel Atkins on the Ireland station. In June 1738 she was under Captain Gilbert Wallis for Home Waters followed by Captain John Forbes in October 1738.

== Disposition ==
HMS Port Mahon was broken by Admiralty Order (AO) 4 October 1739 at Plymouth in May 1740.
