= HMS Royal Sovereign (1701) =

Ship of the line of the Royal Navy

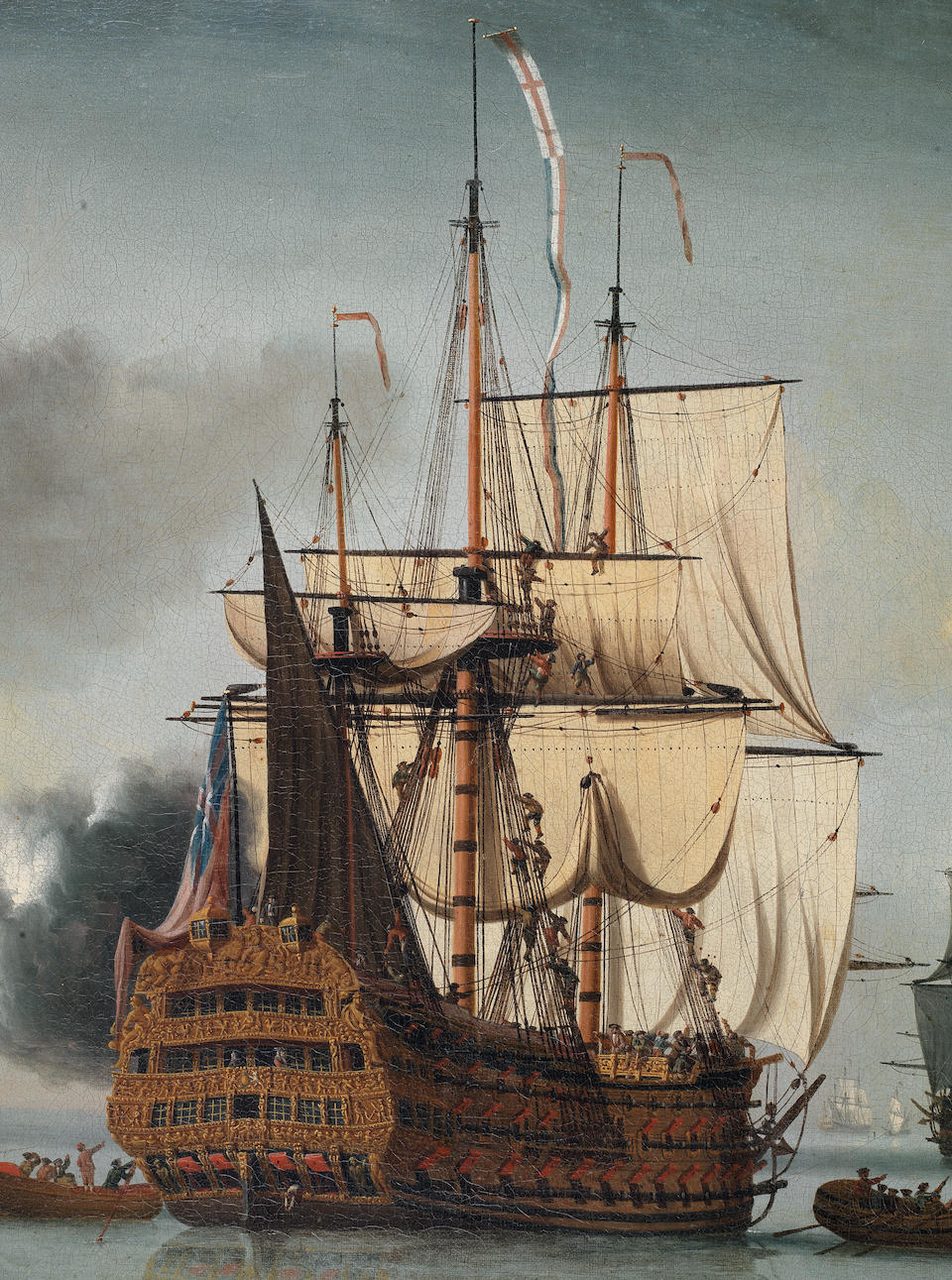
- A detail taken from Royal Sovereign by L. De Man, circa 1725

History

Great Britain
- Name: HMS Royal Sovereign
- Builder: Fisher Harding, Woolwich Dockyard
- Launched: July 1701
- Fate: Broken up, 1768

General characteristics as built
- Class & type: 100-gun first rate ship of the line
- Tons burthen: 1882 71/94 bm
- Length: 174 ft 6 in (53.2 m) (gundeck); 141 ft 7 in (43.2 m) (keel)
- Beam: 50 ft 3.5 in (15.3 m)
- Depth of hold: 19 ft 1 in (5.8 m)
- Propulsion: Sails
- Sail plan: Full-rigged ship
- Armament: 100 guns (1702): Gundeck: 28 × British 32-pounder; Middle gundeck: 28 × British 18-pounder; Upper gundeck: 28 × British 9-pounder; Quarterdeck: 12 × British 6-pounder; Forecastle: 4 × British 6-pounder; 100 guns (1703): Gundeck: 28 × British demi-cannon; Middle gundeck: 28 × British culverin; Upper gundeck: 28 × British demi-culverin; Quarterdeck: 12 × British 6-pounder; Forecastle: 4 × British 6-pounder

General characteristics after 1728 rebuild
- Class & type: 1719 Establishment 100-gun first rate ship of the line
- Tons burthen: 1883 46/94 bm
- Length: 174 ft (53.0 m) (gundeck)
- Beam: 50 ft (15.2 m)
- Depth of hold: 20 ft (6.1 m)
- Propulsion: Sails
- Sail plan: Full-rigged ship
- Armament: 100 guns: Gundeck: 28 × 42 or 32 pdrs; Middle gundeck: 28 × 24-pdrs; Upper gundeck: 28 × 12-pdrs; Quarterdeck: 12 × 6-pdrs; Forecastle: 4 × 6-pdrs

HMS Royal Sovereign was a 100-gun first rate ship of the line of the Royal Navy, built at Woolwich Dockyard and launched in July 1701. She had been built using some of the salvageable timbers from the previous Royal Sovereign, which had been destroyed by fire in 1697.

== Service ==
She was Admiral George Rooke's flagship in the War of the Spanish Succession. She was later the flagship of Admiral Clowdisley Shovell. In the Seven Years' War she was flagship of the Portsmouth fleet. Admiral Boscawen received the death warrant for Admiral John Byng in the captain's cabin in March 1757, and here authorised the firing squad on the nearby HMS Monarch.

Royal Sovereign formed the basis for the dimensions for 100-gun ships in the 1719 Establishment, being a generally well-regarded vessel. In practice, only Royal Sovereign herself was affected by this Establishment, being the only first rate ship either built or rebuilt to the Establishment in its original form, but the Royal William and Britannia had been rebuilt to the same dimensions (approximately) when both were re-launched in 1719. She underwent her rebuild to the 1719 Establishment at Chatham after an order of 18 February 1724, being relaunched on 28 September 1728.

The rebuilt Royal Sovereign remained in service until she was broken up in 1768, ending her career with a total of 67 years' service in the Royal Navy.
