= HMS Seahorse (1712) =

History

Great Britain
- Name: HMS Seahorse
- Ordered: 21 August 1711
- Builder: Royal Dockyard, Portsmouth
- Launched: 13 February 1712
- Commissioned: February 1712
- Fate: Sold 28 July 1748

General characteristics
- Type: 24-gun Sixth Rate
- Tons burthen: 280 23/94 bm
- Length: 94 ft 0 in (28.7 m) gundeck; 78 ft 0 in (23.8 m) keel for tonnage
- Beam: 26 ft 0 in (7.9 m) for tonnage
- Depth of hold: 11 ft 6 in (3.5 m)
- Sail plan: ship-rigged
- Armament: 20 × 6-pdr 19 cwt guns on wooden trucks (UD); 4 × 4-pdr 12 cwt guns on wooden trucks (QD)

General characteristics as rebuilt 1727
- Type: 20-gun Sixth Rate
- Tons burthen: 374 45/94 bm
- Length: 106 ft 0 in (32.3 m) gundeck; 87 ft 9 in (26.7 m) keel for tonnage
- Beam: 28 ft 4 in (8.6 m) for tonnage
- Depth of hold: 9 ft 2 in (2.8 m)
- Sail plan: ship-rigged
- Armament: 20 × 6-pdr 19 cwt guns on wooden trucks (UD)

HMS Seahorse was a 24-gun Gibraltar Group sixth rate of the British Royal Navy. After commissioning she spent her career in Home waters and North America on trade protection duties. She was rebuilt at Deptford between 1725 and 1727. After her rebuild she served in Home Waters, North America, West Indies and the Mediterranean on trade protection. She was sold in 1749.

Seahorse was the sixth vessel so named, the first being a ship captured 1625 and last mentioned in 1635.

== Construction ==
She was ordered on 21 August 1711 from Portsmouth Dockyard to be built under the guidance of Richard Stacey, Master Shipwright of Portsmouth. She was launched on 13 February 1712. She was completed on 4 May 1712 at an initial cost of £1,869.17.53/4 (Note: A total cost accounting for inflation of approximately £333,600 today.)

== Commissioned service ==
She was commissioned in 1712 under the command of Captain James Dalzell, RN. Captain Dalzell was killed in action with a privateer on 14 September 1712 and Captain William Basille, RN took command. In January 1713 Captain Hercules Baker, RN took command. Later in 1713 Captain Charles Arundel, RN the took command followed by Captain Joseph Soanes, RN in 1715 for service in the Leeward Islands. She returned to Home Waters in 1716 for a small repair at Deptford from September to December 1716 at a cost of £1,302.12.9d. (Note: A total cost accounting for inflation of approximately £231,300 today.) She was under the command of Captain Thomas Willyams, RN in 1717 for service in the North Sea and Baltic. Captain William Martin, RN. Sailed to Newfoundland in 1719. Captain Thomas Durell, RN took command in 1720 for service in New England. She returned to Home Waters and underwent a survey on 20 March 1727 and was ordered to be rebuilt as a 375-ton sixth rate.

== Rebuild at Deptford 1725 - 1727 ==
She was dismantled at Deptford in preparation for rebuilding as a 374 ton 20-gun sixth rate under the guidance of Richard Stacey, Master Shipwright of Deptford. She was launched on 7 October 1727. The dimensions after rebuild were gundeck 106 feet 0 inches (32.3 metres) with a keel length of 87 feet 9 inches (26.7 metres) for tonnage calculation. The breadth was 28 feet 4 inches (8.6 metres) with a depth of hold of 9 ft 2 in (2.8 m). The tonnage calculation was 37445/94 tons. The gun armament as established in 1713 was twenty 6-pounder 19 hundredweight (cwt) guns mounted on wooden trucks. She was completed for sea on 30 November 1727 at a cost of £3,953.14.0d (Note: A total cost accounting for inflation of approximately £696,900} today.) including fitting.

== Commissioned Service after Rebuild ==
She was commissioned in 1728 under the command of Captain Ambrose Saunders, RN for service in Ireland. Captain Saunders died on 6 March 1731. She was fitted at Sheerness for service in the West Indies in June 1731. After her fitting was complete she was commissioned under Captain Edward Baker for service in the Leeward Islands. She returned home and paid off in January 1734. She underwent a middling repair and refitted at Sheerness for £1,928.1.1d (Note: A total cost accounting for inflation of approximately £376,100 today.) from March 1734 to February 1735. After completion, she was commissioned under Captain James Compton, RN for service at the Province of Georgia. She returned home and paid off on 9 December 1738. Upon her return she underwent a great repair at Deptford for £5,033.18.3d (Note: A total cost accounting for inflation of approximately £972,600 today.) from March thru November 1739. She recommissioned in October 1739 under Captain William Cleland, RN. Captain Thomas Limeburner, RN took command in July 1740 and sailed with Ogle's Squadron to the West Indies arriving in November 1740. In May 1741 she was under Captain Edward Allen, RN, in May 1742 Captain Thorpe Fowke, RN then in 1745 under Captain John Simcoe, RN all for service at Jamaica. She participated in Mitchell's encounter with Conflans between 4 and 13 August 1746. She returned home in 1747.

== Disposition ==
HMS Seahorse was sold by Admiralty Order (AO) 1 December 1747 to Mr. Milward for £5,033.18.3d (Note: A total cost accounting for inflation of approximately £954,600 today.) on 28 July 1748.
