= HMS Greyhound (1712) =

History

Great Britain
- Name: HMS Greyhound
- Ordered: 9 October 1711
- Builder: Royal Dockyard, Woolwich
- Launched: 26 June 1712
- Completed: 15 July 1712
- Commissioned: 1712
- Captured: 5 September 1718 by Spain
- Fate: Recaptured 16 September 1719 and burnt

General characteristics
- Type: 24-gun Sixth Rate
- Tons burthen: 275 91/94 bm
- Length: 94 ft 0 in (28.7 m) gundeck; 76 ft 9 in (23.4 m) keel for tonnage
- Beam: 26 ft 0 in (7.9 m) for tonnage
- Depth of hold: 11 ft 6 in (3.5 m)
- Sail plan: ship-rigged
- Armament: 20 × 6-pdr 19 cwt guns on wooden trucks (UD); 4 × 4-pdr 12 cwt guns on wooden trucks (QD)

HMS Greyhound was a member of the Gibraltar Group of 24-gun sixth rates. After commissioning she spent her career in Home waters and the Mediterranean on trade protection duties. She was captured by five Spanish warships off Morocco in 1718 then recaptured in 1719 and burnt.

Greyhound was the eighth named vessel since it was used for a 45-gun ship launched at Deptford in 1545, rebuilt 1558 and wrecked in 1563 off the Rye.

== Construction ==
She was ordered on 9 October 1711 from Woolwich Dockyard to be built under the guidance of Jacob Acworth, Master Shipwright of Woolwich. She was launched on 21 June 1712. She was completed for sea on 15 July 1712.

== Commissioned service ==
She was commissioned in 1712 under the command of Commander Thomas Marwood, RN (promoted to captain in January 1713) for service at Minorca. She moved to the English Channel for 1715 thru 1717. In 1718 she was under the command of Commander John Cundett, RN for service off Sale, Morocco.

== Loss ==
HMS Greyhound was captured by five Spanish warships in St Jerome's Bay, near Cape Spartel, Morocco, on 5 September 1718. She was retaken on 16 September 1719 and burnt.
