= HMS Princess (1740) =

18th-century Royal Navy ship

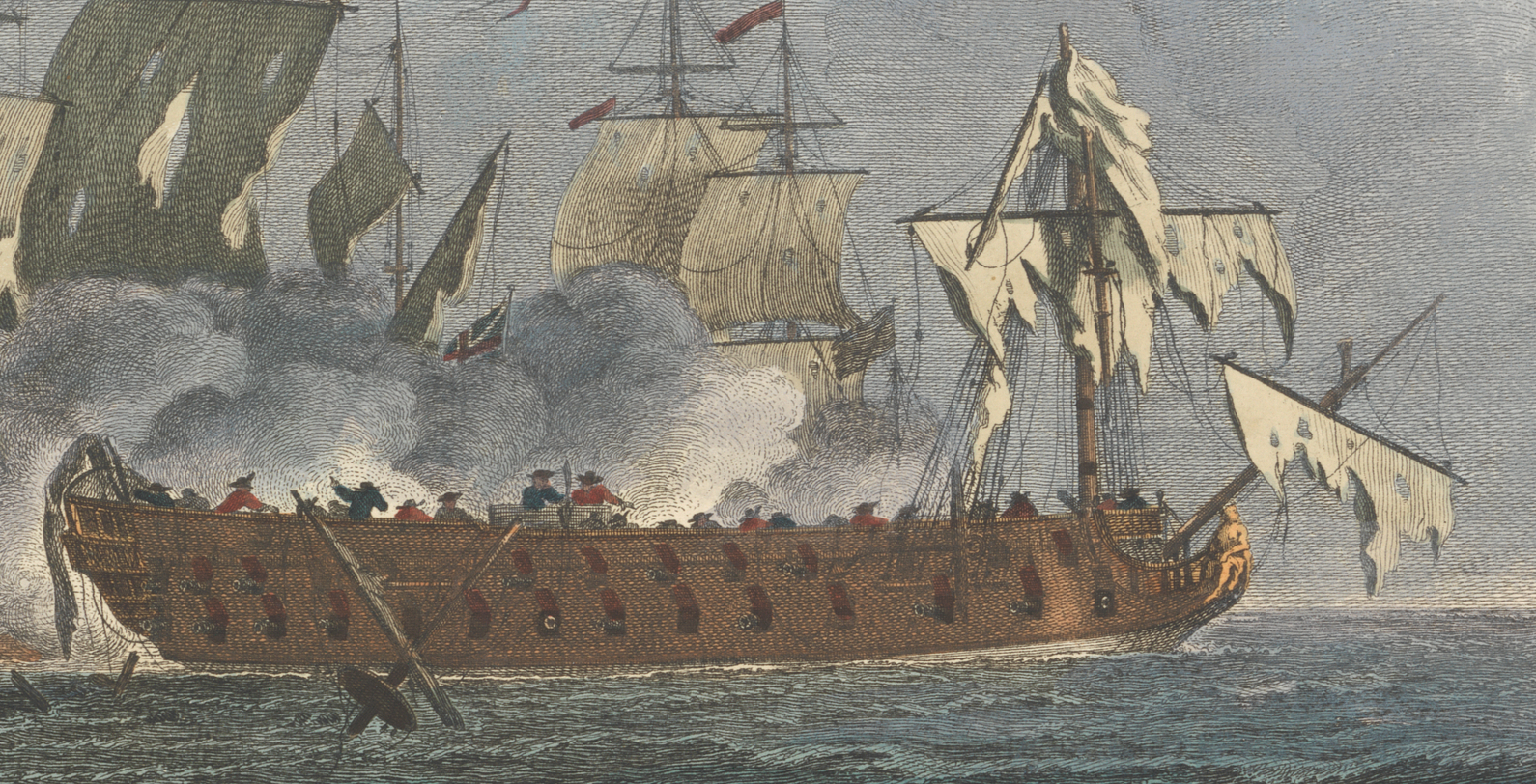
- Princesa at the action of 8 April 1740

History

Spain
- Name: Princesa
- Builder: Guarnizo, Santander
- Launched: 1730
- Captured: 8 April 1740 (19 April New Style), by the Royal Navy

Great Britain
- Name: HMS Princess
- Acquired: 8 April 1740
- Fate: Sold for breaking up on 30 December 1784

General characteristics
- Class & type: 70-gun third rate ship of the line
- Tons burthen: 1,709 3/94 bm
- Length: 165 ft 1 in (50.3 m) (overall); 130 ft 3 in (39.7 m) (keel)
- Beam: 49 ft 8 in (15.1 m)
- Depth of hold: 22 ft 3 in (6.78 m)
- Propulsion: Sails
- Sail plan: Full-rigged ship
- Complement: 480
- Armament: Lower deck: 28 × 32-pdrs; Upper deck: 28 × 18-pdrs; Quarterdeck: 12 × 9-pdrs; Forecastle: 2 × 9-pdrs

HMS Princess was a 70-gun third rate ship of the line of the Royal Navy. She had served for ten years as the Princesa for the Spanish Navy, until her capture off Cape Finisterre at the action of 8 April 1740 during the War of the Austrian Succession.

After being chased down and captured by three British ships, she was acquired for service by the Royal Navy. Her design and fighting qualities excited considerable interest, and sparked a series of increases in the dimensions of British warships. She went on to serve under a number of commanders in several theatres of the War of the Austrian Succession, including the Mediterranean, where she was at the Battle of Toulon, and in the Caribbean and off the North American coast. She was then laid up and being assessed, was not reactivated for service during the Seven Years' War. She was instead reduced to a hulk at Portsmouth, in which capacity she lasted out both the Seven Years' War and the American War of Independence, being sold for breaking up in 1784, shortly after the end of the latter conflict, after a career in British service lasting 44 years.

== Spanish career and capture ==
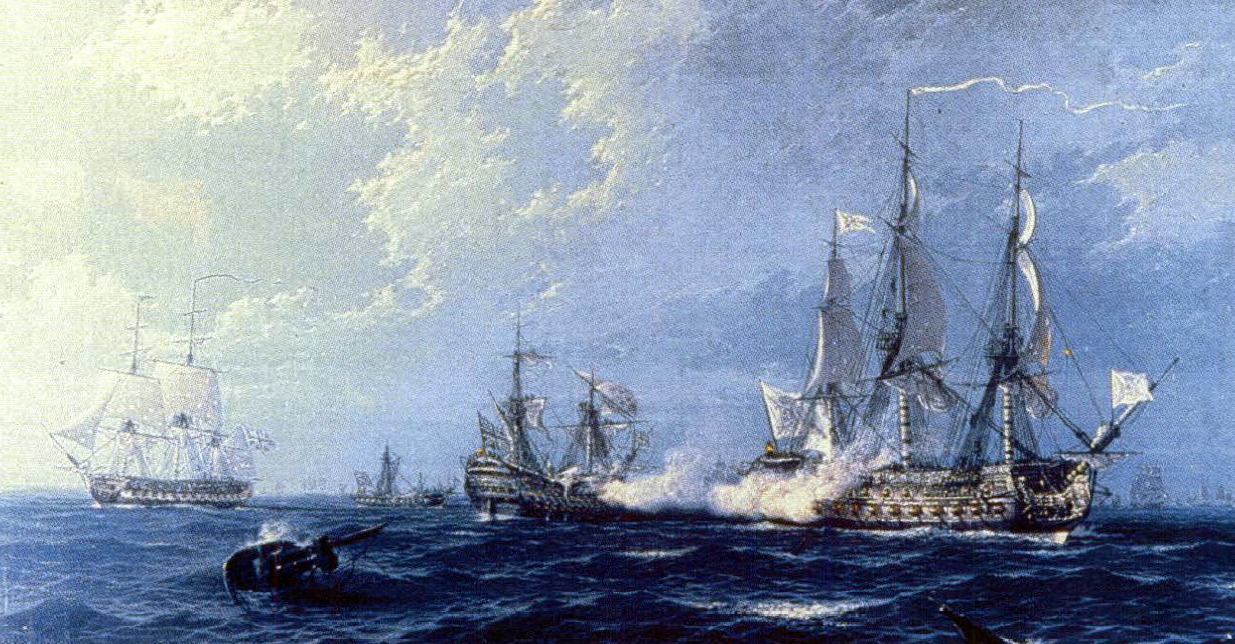
Battle between the Princesa (right foreground), and HMS Lenox, Orford and Kent, 8 April 1740

Princesa was built in 1730 to the design of Ciprian Autran in the shipyard of El Astillero, Guarnizo (Santander) in Cantabria, being rated at 70 guns (26 × 24-pdrs; 28 × 18-pdrs; 16 × 8-pdrs). During the 1730s she operated chiefly in the Mediterranean, taking part in the campaign off Italy in 1731 and subsequently in operations against Barbary pirates. She left Ferrol in 1739. On 25 March 1740 news reached the Admiralty that two Spanish ships had sailed from Buenos Aires, and were bound for Spain. Word was sent to Portsmouth and a squadron of three ships, consisting of the 70-gun ships HMS Kent, HMS Lenox and HMS Orford, under the command of Captain Colvill Mayne of Lenox, were prepared to intercept them. The ships, part of Sir John Balchen's fleet were briefly joined by HMS Rippon and HMS St Albans, and the squadron sailed from Portsmouth at 3 am on 29 March, passing down the English Channel. Rippon and St Albans fell astern on 5 April, and though Mayne shortened sail, they did not come up. On 8 April Mayne's squadron was patrolling some 300 miles south-west of The Lizard when a ship was sighted to the north.

The British came up and found her to be Princesa, now carrying 64 guns and a crew of 650 under the command of Don Pablo Agustin de Aguirre. They began to chase her at 10 am, upon which she lowered the French colours she had been flying and hoisted Spanish ones. Mayne addressed his men saying "When you received the pay of your country, you engaged yourselves to stand all dangers in her cause. Now is the trial; fight like men for you have no hope but in your courage." After a chase lasting two and a half hours, the British were able to come alongside and exchange broadsides, which eventually left the Spanish ship disabled. The British then raked her until she struck her colours. The Spanish ship had casualties of 33 killed and around 100 wounded, while eight men were killed aboard both Kent and Orford, and another one aboard Lenox. Total British wounded amounted to 40, and included Captain Thomas Durell of Kent, who had one of his hands shot away. The commander of Orford during the engagement had been Lord Augustus FitzRoy.

According to the Spanish records of the engagement, Princesa had lost a mast before encountering the British squadron. She fought a fierce battle against the pursuing British squadron, which lasted six hours. Princesa inflicted serious damage on Lenox and forced Kent to withdraw, but was unable to resist Orford and struck her colours. The crew of Princesa suffered 70 killed and 80 wounded, and she was taken to Portsmouth for repairs. Afterward, Princesa was commissioned into the Royal Navy.

== British service ==
Princesa was brought into Portsmouth on 8 May 1740. An Admiralty order of 21 April 1741 authorised her purchase, and this was duly done on 14 July 1741 for the sum of £5,418/11s/6 3/4d. After a great repair she was fitted at Portsmouth between July 1741 and March 1742, for a total sum of £36,007/2s/10d. Her spirited resistance to three ships of equal rating attracted much comment. A contemporary description noted that she was larger than any British first rate and carried unusually large guns, many of them brass. She was described as the finest ship in the Spanish Navy, with her high build allowing her to open her lower gunports in conditions in which her opponents could not. The Admiralty finally had the ammunition to rouse Parliament from its complacency and fund a series of increases in British warship dimensions.

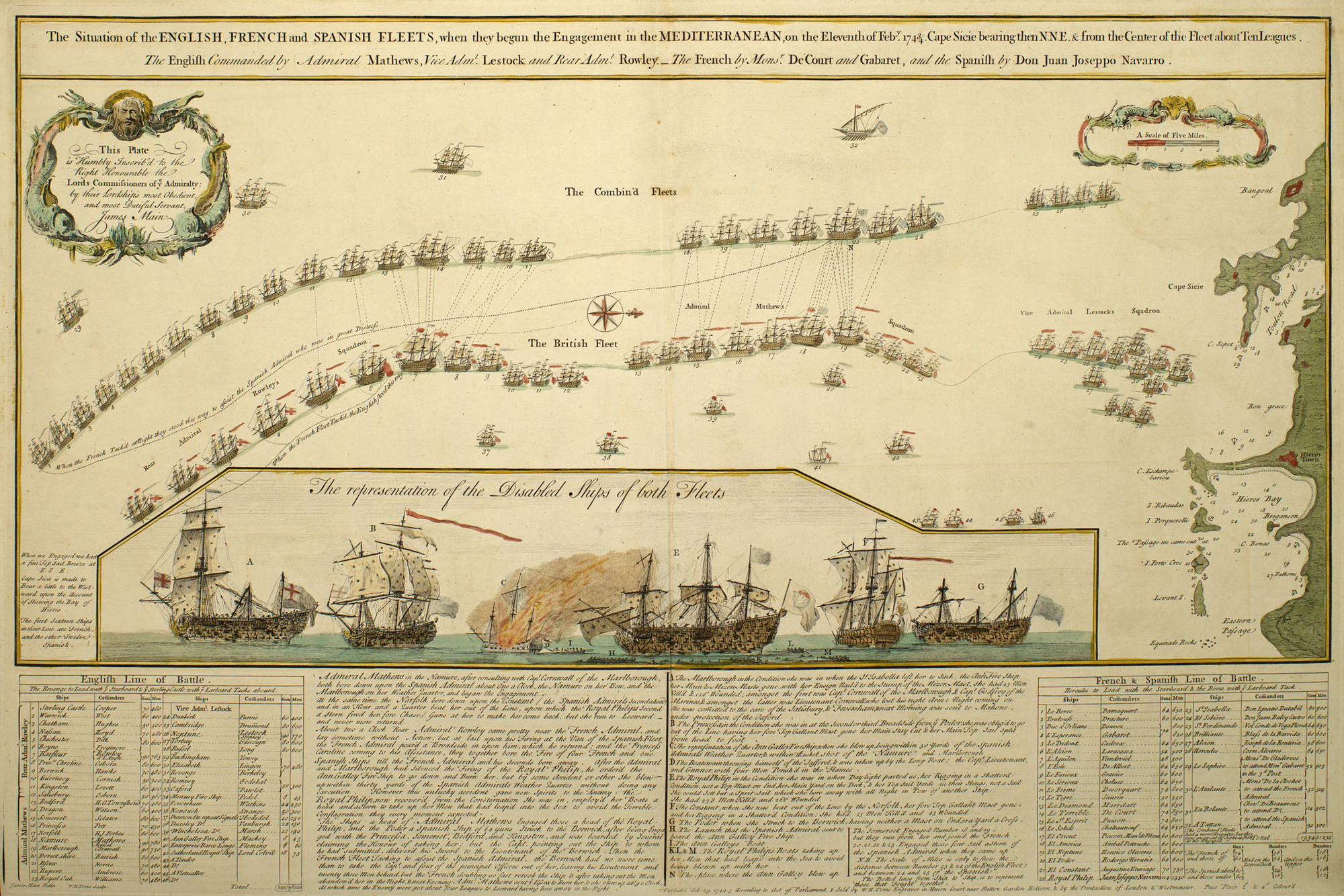
Map of the Battle of Toulon; Princess is numbered 16

Princess was commissioned under her first commander, Captain Perry Mayne, in July 1741. He was succeeded in 1743 by Captain Robert Pett, who took her out to the Mediterranean in December that year. She was part of Admiral Thomas Mathews' fleet at the Battle of Toulon on 14 February 1744. She came under the temporary command of Commander John Donkley in July 1745, though he was soon replaced by Captain Joseph Lingen, all the while continuing in the Mediterranean. Thomas Philpot took command in 1746, and Princess sailed for the Leeward Islands with Admiral George Townshend. Captain John Cokburne took over in July 1746 and Princess first sailed to Louisbourg and then home after a gale. She became the flagship of Admiral Richard Lestock later in 1746 and was present at the operations off Lorient from 20 to 25 September 1746. In May 1747 Captain the Hon. Augustus Hervey took over command, and sailed to the Mediterranean, where in October 1747 she briefly became the flagship of Vice-Admiral John Byng.

== Later years ==
Princess was paid off in November 1748. She was surveyed the following year, but no repairs were reported. After a period laid up and inactive, she was reported to be unfit for service on 15 November 1755; she was converted to a hulk at Portsmouth between August 1759 and July 1761. She was recommissioned in 1759 under Captain Edward Barber, and continued as a hulk during the Seven Years' War and the American War of Independence. Princess was finally sold at Portsmouth on 30 December 1784.
