= HMS Hind (1712) =

History

Great Britain
- Name: HMS Hind
- Ordered: 24 January 1711
- Builder: Royal Dockyard, Woolwich
- Launched: 31 October 1711
- Commissioned: 1712
- Fate: Wrecked off Guernsey 7 December 1721

General characteristics
- Type: 24-gun Sixth Rate
- Tons burthen: 275 91/94 bm
- Length: 94 ft 0 in (28.7 m) gundeck; 76 ft 9 in (23.4 m) keel for tonnage
- Beam: 26 ft 0 in (7.9 m) for tonnage
- Depth of hold: 11 ft 7 in (3.5 m)
- Armament: 20 × 6-pdr 19 cwt guns on wooden trucks (UD); 4 × 4-pdr 12 cwt guns on wooden trucks (QD)

HMS Hind was a member of the Gibraltar Group of 24-gun sixth rates. After commissioning she spent her career in Home Waters and the Baltic on trade protection duties. She was lost with all hands in a storm in the Bay of Biscay in March 1719.

Hind was the eighth vessel so named since the name was first used for a 28-gun vessel built in 1545 and sold in 1555.

== Construction ==
She was ordered on 24 January 1711 from Woolwich Dockyard to be built under the guidance of Jacob Acworth, Master Shipwright of Woolwich. She was launched on 31 October 1711.

== Commissioned service ==
She was commissioned in 1712 under the command of Captain George Fairly, RN for service in Ireland. Captain Fairly was dismissed by quartmartial in December 1714. With Captain Fairly's dismissal, in December 1714 Captain Arthur Delgarno, RN took command and sailed in May for the Mediterranean. She took part in operations against the pirate vessels of Sale, Morocco during 1716 thru 1717. She returned to Home Waters to undergo a small repair at Portsmouth during June - July 1717 at a cost of £1,014.11.8d. (Note: A total cost accounting for inflation of approximately £188,700 in today's money.) In 1718 she was under the command of Captain William Collier, RN in the Channel Islands. in 1720 she was under Captain John Furzer, RN.

== Loss ==
HMS Hind was Wrecked off Guernsey with loss of 24 sailors, including her commander on 7 December 1721.
