= HMS Lenox (1678) =

Ship of the line of the Royal Navy

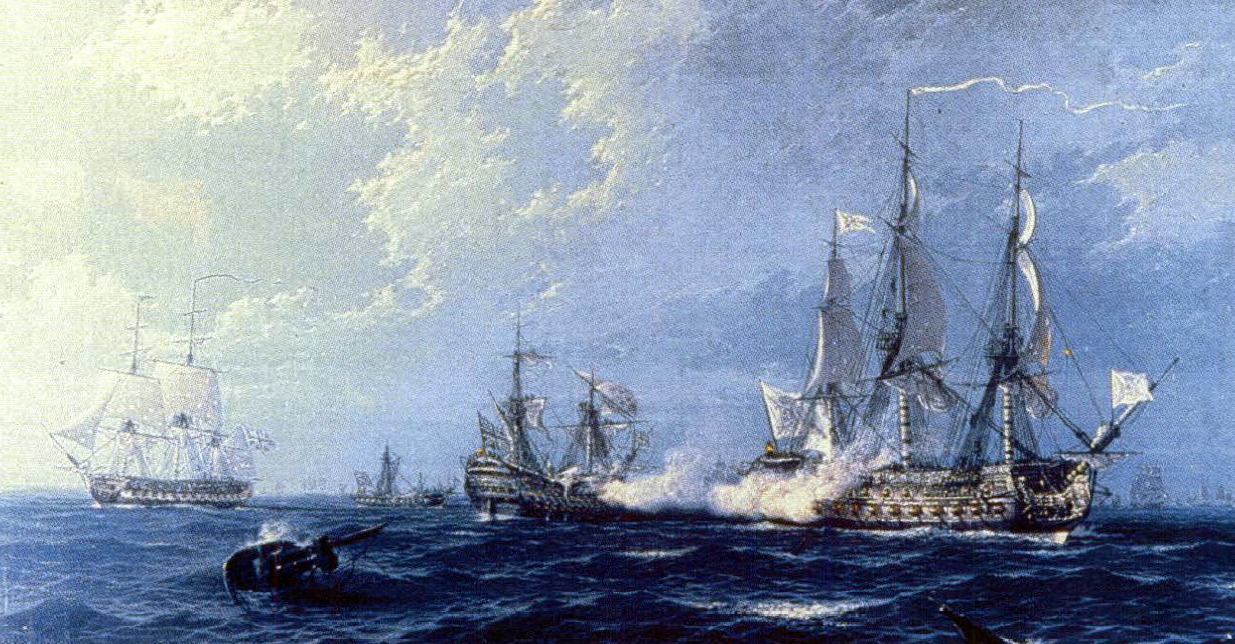
- Battle between the Spanish 70-gun Princess (right foreground), and HMS Lenox, Orford and Kent, 8 April 1740

History

England
- Name: HMS Lenox
- Ordered: April 1677
- Builder: Deptford Dockyard
- Laid down: 25 June 1677
- Launched: 18 April 1678
- Decommissioned: 9 May 1678
- Honours and awards: Barfleur 1692; Gibraltar 1704; Velez Malaga 1704; Passero 1718
- Fate: Sunk as a breakwater at Sheerness April 1756

General characteristics as built
- Class & type: 70-gun third rate ship of the line
- Tons burthen: 101274/94 tons (bm)
- Length: 151 ft 6 in (46.18 m) gundeck; 120 ft 0 in (36.58 m) keel for tonnage
- Beam: 39 ft 8 in (12.09 m)
- Draught: 18 ft 0 in (5.49 m)
- Depth of hold: 17 ft 0 in (5.18 m)
- Propulsion: Sails
- Sail plan: Full-rigged ship
- Armament: 1677 Establishment 72/60 guns; 26 × demi-cannons (54 cwt – 9.5 ft (LD); 26 × 12-pdr guns 32 cwt – 9 ft (UD); 10 × sakers 16 cwt – 7 ft (QD); 4 × sakers 16 cwt – 7 ft (Fc); 5 × 5 3-pdr guns 5 cwt – 5 ft (RH)

General characteristics after 1701 rebuild
- Class & type: 70-gun third rate ship of the line
- Tons burthen: 1,08911/94 tons (bm)
- Length: 152 ft 7.5 in (46.52 m) gundeck; 126 ft 1.5 in (38.44 m) keel for tonnage
- Beam: 40 ft 3.5 in (12.28 m)
- Depth of hold: 17 ft 1 in (5.21 m)
- Propulsion: Sails
- Sail plan: Full-rigged ship
- Armament: 1703 Establishment 70/62 guns; 24/22 × 24 pdr guns (LD); 26/24 × demi-culverins (UD); 12/10 × 6-pdr guns (QD); 4/2 × 6-pdr guns (Fc); 4 × 3-pdr guns (RH)

General characteristics 1719 Establishment Group
- Class & type: 1719 Establishment 70-gun third rate ship of the line
- Tons burthen: 1,12829/94 tons (bm)
- Length: 151 ft (46.02 m) gundeck; 123 ft (37.49 m)
- Beam: 41 ft 6 in (12.65 m)
- Depth of hold: 17 ft 4 in (5.28 m)
- Propulsion: Sails
- Sail plan: Full-rigged ship
- Complement: 440 personnel
- Armament: 70 guns 1719 Establishment; 24 × 24-pdr guns (LD); 26 × 12-pdr guns (UD); 14 × 6-pdr guns (QD); 4 × 6-pdr guns (Fc)
- Notes: By 1746 guns reduced to 64 by removing six 6-pounder guns

HMS Lenox was a 70-gun third rate built at Deptford Dockyard in 1677/78. She was in active commission for the Nine Years War, fighting in the Battles of Beachy Head and Barfleur. She was rebuilt in 1699. Again in active commission for the War of Spanish Succession fighting in the Capture of Gibraltar and the Battle of Velez Malaga. She followed this with the Battle off Passero. She was rebuilt again in 1721. She was active in the War with Spain, capturing the Princesa then serving in Home Waters, the Mediterranean and finally the West Indies. She was in action off Havana in 1745. She returned home and was placed in Ordinary. She was finally sunk as a breakwater at Sheerness in 1756.

She was named in honour of Charles II illegitimate son, Charles Lennox, his son with Louise de Keroualle (Duchess of Portsmouth). Charles Lennox was made the Duke of Lennox in 1675 . This was the first vessel to bear the name Lenox (also spelt Lennox) in the English and Royal Navy.

HMS Lenox/Lennox was awarded the Battle Honour Barfleur 1692, Gibraltar 1704, Velez-Malaga 1704, and Passero 1718.

== Construction and specifications ==
She was ordered in April 1677 as an early ship in the "thirty ship" program that was authorised by parliament on 23 February 1677. She was designed and built at Deptford Dockyard by Master Shipwright John Shish, perhaps based on the design of HMS Royal Oak (1674), the last ship built by John's father, Jonas Shish. Her keel was laid on 25 June 1677 and launched on 18 April 1678. Her dimensions were a gundeck of 151 feet 6 inches (46.18 metres) with a keel of 120 feet 0 inches (36.58 metres) for tonnage calculation with a breadth of 39 feet 10 inches (12.14 metres) and a depth of hold of 17 feet 0 inches (5.18 metres). Her builder's measure tonnage was calculated as 1,01274/94 tons (burthen). Her Draught was 18 feet 0 inches (5.49 metres).

Her initial gun armament was in accordance with the 1677 Establishment with 72/60 guns consisting of twenty-six demi-cannons (54 cwt, 9.5 ft) on the lower deck, twenty-four 12-pounder guns (32 cwt, 9 ft) on the upper deck, ten sakers (16 cwt, 7 ft) on the quarterdeck and four sakers (16 cwt, 7 ft) on the foc's'le with four 3-pounder guns (5 cwt, 5 ft) on the poop deck or roundhouse. Their initial manning establishment would be for a crew of 460/380/300 personnel . By 1688 she would carry 70 guns as per the 1685 Establishment, however, the demi-culverins replaced the 12-pounders on the upper deck. In 1690 she would still carry 70 guns consisting of twenty-two demi-cannons, four culverins, twenty-six demi-culverins, twelve demi-culverin cutts, and six 3-pounder guns.

== Commissioned service ==
=== Service 1678 to 1699 ===
HMS Lenox was commissioned on 9 May 1678 under the command of Captain John Kirke until 17 May 1678 for transport to Chatham. In 1690 she was commissioned for the War of the English Succession under command of Captain John Granvill for the Battle of Beachy Head in Centre (Red) Squadron on 30 June 1690. In 1692 she was under Captain John Munden for the Battle of Barfleur in Red Squadron, Rear Division from 19 to 22 May 1692. In 1693 she was under Captain William Kerr. During 1694/95 she was under Captain Christopher Myngs sailing with the Fleet. In 1697 she was under Captain James Greenaway on convoy service. She would be rebuilt at Deptford in 1701.

=== Rebuild at Deptford 1699 to 1701 ===
She was ordered rebuilt on 14 September 1699, under contract by Edward Popely of Deptford. She was completed/launched in February 1701. Her dimensions were a gundeck of 152 feet 7.5 inches (46.52 metres) with a keel of 126 feet 1.5 inches (38.44 metres) for tonnage calculation with a breadth of 40 feet 3.5 inches (12.28 metres) and a depth of hold of 17 feet 1 inch (5.21 metres). Her builder's measure tonnage was calculated as 1,08911/94 tons (burthen).

Her armament was under the 1703 Establishment as 70 guns wartime/62 guns peacetime consisting of twenty-four/twenty-two 24-pounder guns of 9.5 feet in length on the lower deck, twenty-six/twenty-four demi-culverins of 9-foot length on the upper deck, twelve/ten 6-pounder guns of 8.5-foot length on the quarterdeck, and four/two 6-pounder guns of (2/2) 9-foot length and (2/0) of 7.5-foot length, with four 5.5 foot 3-pounder guns on the poop deck or roundhouse. She may have carried her demi-cannons on the lower deck for a few years more. Her 1716-gun establishment was changed to twenty-six 24-pounder guns of 9.5-foot and 64 hundredweight (cwt) on the lower deck, twenty-six 12-pounder guns of 9-foot length and 32 cwt on the upper deck, fourteen 6-pounder guns of 8-foot length and 20 cwt on the quarterdeck, and a further four 6-pounder guns on the foc's'le. These guns were used as chasers and were (2) 9-foot guns of 24 cwt and two as on the quarterdeck.

Service from 1702 to 1721 HMS Lenox was commissioned in 1702 under the command of Captain William Jumper to sail with Sir George Rooke's Fleet for operations at Cadiz, Spain. The sailed from Spithead to St Helens (in the Scilly Islands) on 19 July 1702. The arrived at the Bay of Bulls (six miles north of Cadiz) on 12 August. She provided covering fire for the landing of troops at Rota on 15 August, driving the defenders from their batteries. Rota surrendered on the 16th. After many conferences and negotiations, the stores that had been seized were destroyed and the troops were re-embarked on 15 September. On 19 September it was decided to return to England. On 21 September it was learned that a French Fleet and Spanish treasure ships were in the vicinity of Vigo Bay. On the 11th a council of war was held to determine the ships that would initially enter the bay. HMS Lenox was not chosen and remained off the entrance of the Bay of Vigo.

After the arrival of Sir Cloudisley Shovel on the 16th of August, she remained with his Fleet moving to the Mediterranean in September 1703. She partook in the capture of Gibraltar on 23 July 1704. She was part of the force that was to attack the New Mole. Gibraltar surrendered on the 24th. Captain Jumper was honoured by having Jumper's Bastion in Gibraltar named after him. On August 13, 1704, she fought in the Battle of Velez Malaga as a member of the Van Squadron, suffering 23 killed and 78 wounded. In 1707 she was back in the Mediterranean with Admiral Sir Cloudesley Shovell’s Fleet. On the Fleets return to England in October 1707, a substantial part was wrecked off the Scilly Isles. Lenox herself was undamaged and was able to return to Portsmouth after the disaster.

In 1708 she was under Captain Richard Culliford sailing with Sir Christopher Byng's Fleet in the North Sea and the English Channel. She was on the Irish Station in July 1708 then sailed to Lisbon in October, then on to the Mediterranean in 1709. In 1710 she was at Chatham for a survey of her condition. 1712 under Captain John Bennet she sailed to St Helena then on to the Cape. On her return she underwent a small repair at Chatham for a cost of 1,177.10.8d between March and May 1718. She was recommissioned in 1718 in response to the Spanish invasion of Sicily, under Captain Charles Strickland for service in the Mediterranean with Sir George Byng's Fleet. The Fleet departed from Spithead on 15 June 1718, arriving at Naples on 1 August. She fought at the Battle of Passero on 11 August 1718. Most Spanish ships were either captured or destroyed. She remained in the Mediterranean for the duration of the War for Sicily. She was docked at Portsmouth on 2 May 1721 for dismantling in preparation for rebuilding.

=== Rebuild at Chatham1721-1723 ===
She was ordered rebuilt to the 1719 Establishment on 2 May 1721, at Chatham Dockyard under the guidance of Master Shipwright Benjamin Rosewell. She was launched on 19 September 1723. Her dimensions were a gundeck of 151 feet 0 inches (46.02 metres) with a keel of 123 feet 2 inches (37.54 metres) for tonnage calculation with a breadth of 41 feet 6 inches (12.65 metres) and a depth of hold of 17 feet 4 inches (5.28 metres). Her builder's measure tonnage was calculated as 1,12829/94 tons (burthen).

Her armament was under the 1719 Establishment as 70 guns consisting of twenty-six 24-pounder guns on the lower deck (LD), twenty-six 12-pounder guns on the upper deck (UD), fourteen 6-pounder guns on the quarterdeck (QD), and four 6-pounder guns on the foc's'le (Fc). By 1746 she was reduced to 64 guns with the upper and lower decks remaining the same, ten 6-pounder guns on the quarterdeck (QD), and two 6-pounder guns on the foc's'le (Fc). Her crew would be 440 personnel.

The work was completed in the spring of 1726, at a cost of £14,917.12.6d (Note: A total cost accounting for inflation of approximately £2,732,800 in today's money) for the rebuild and £1,057.11.0d (Note: A total cost accounting for inflation of approximately £193,700 in today's money) for fitting out.

=== Service 1726-1756 ===
She was commissioned in 1726 under the command of Captain Hercules Baker for service with Admiral Sir John Jenning's Fleet to check the hostile designs of Spain. She sailed with Admiral Jenning's Fleet of nine ships of the line from St Helens in the Scilly Islands on 30 July to the Straits of Gibraltar and returning in October 1726. She underwent a fitting at Portsmouth in December. She was readied for sea under the command of Captain Digby Dent to join Vice-Admiral Sir Charles Wager's Fleet. The Fleet sailed for the Straits of Gibraltar on 19 January 1727. She in concert with Berwick was detached to join Vice-Admiral Francis Hosier in the West Indies on 13 February. The Fleet of sixteen ships harried the Spaniards to the point that the annual treasure fleet did not sail for Spain while the Fleet was on station. After much death due to disease and the loss of three Fleet commanders (Vice-Admirals Hosier and Hopsonn plus Captain E. St Loe (SNO)) Lenox returned to Home Waters 1729 to pay off. She underwent a small repair at Portsmouth costing £5,253.5.9d (Note: A total cost accounting for inflation of approximately £1,016,500 in today's money) during August to October 1730. She was fitted as a guard ship at Portsmouth in the Spring of 1734. She was recommissioned under the command of Captain Joseph Winder then later under Captain Tyrwitt Cayley operating with Philip Cavendish's Fleet in Home Waters. She was paid off in November 1735. After a small repair she was fitted at Portsmouth for £2,088.7.9d (Note: A total cost accounting for inflation of approximately £414,500 in today's money) between June and August 1738 then reduced to a guard ship in December 1738.

With the outbreak of war with Spain (aka the War of Jenkins' Ear 1739–1749) in October 1739, she was commissioned under Captain Covill Mayne in 1739 then selected for service with Vice-Admiral Edward Vernon's squadron on 23 July. She was detached along with Elizabeth and Kent, to cruise off Cape Ortegal for a month, then to return to England. In 1740 she was at sea as part of Vice-Admiral John Balchen's squadron. Lenox, Kent, Oxford, St Albans, and Ripon had been detached to watch for the Spanish Treasure Fleet. The fleet was not found. However, the Spanish 64-gun ship Princesa was sighted at 9am on the 8th of August. In concert with Kent and Orford, she took the Spanish ship off Cape Finisterre on 8 April 1740. She then joined Sir John Norris's Fleet off Ferrol during July and September. In 1741 she was under the command of Captain James Compton sailing with Admiral Norris's Fleet in July 1741. Admiral Norris attempted to sail three times from St Helens in the Scilly Islands but was driven back on all three attempts due to bad weather. He finally made it to sea in October then cruised of the North Coast of Spain returning to Spithead on 6 November. She was in the Mediterranean in 1742, firstly in Rear-Admiral Richard Lestock's Fleet then Vice-Admiral Thomas Mathews. She underwent a great repair at Portsmouth for £15,066.10.4d (Note: A total cost accounting for inflation of approximately £3,168,800 in today's money) during March 1743 and June 1744. War with France started on 31 March 1744 (The War of Austrian Succession 1744–1749), she was recommissioned in April 1744 under the command of Captain Charles Wyndham for service with Vice-Admiral Henry Medley's Squadron during the winter of 1744/45. In October 1744 she was under Captain Peter Lawrence sailing with Rear-Admiral William Martin's Western Squadron.

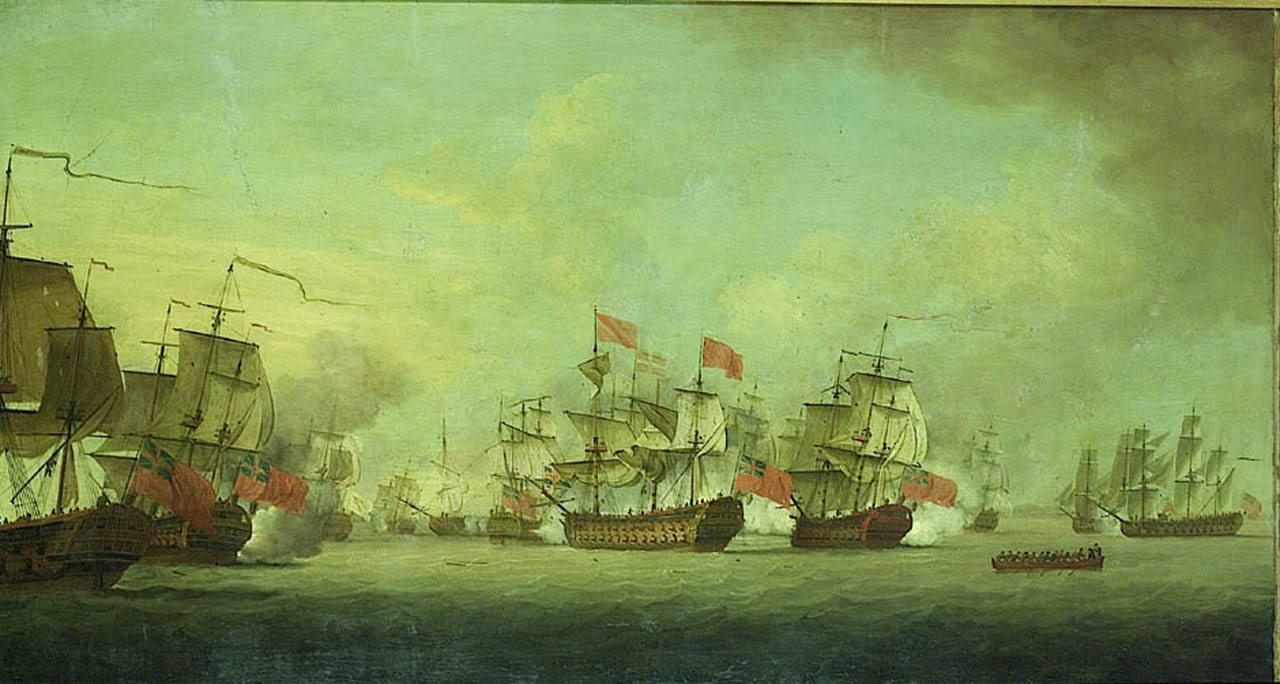
The Lenox (second left) during Knowles Action at Havana, 1748

Later in 1745 She was under the command of Captain Edmund Toll. She sailed in August 1745 to the West Indies with Vice-Admiral Isaac Townsend's Squadron. She participated in Commodore Cornelius Michell's encounter with Marquis de Conflans in the Windward Passage during 3 to 13 August 1746. Commodore Mitchell's Squadron though marginally superior to de Conflans’ Squadron did not engage on the 3rd. On the 4th of August by 4pm he was in an advantageous position but shorten sail then ran for Jamaica. By 8pm the leading French ship closed and engaged the Lenox. The fight last about 90 minutes and the Lenox managed to escape. Commodore Michell was court martialled and dismissed from service. In 1747 she was under Captain Peter Lawrence once more. She was involved in the encounter with Marquis de Dubois de La Motte's squadron off Cape Nicholas on 25 March 1747. In October 1747 she was under Captain Charles Holmes and sailed to join Rear-Admiral Charles Knowles at Port Royal, Jamaica. In August she was detached to escort a convoy destined for England departing on 25 August 1748. On 29 September a Spanish fleet of seven men-of-war were sighted. Captain Holmes dispersed the convoy and led the Spanish to Admiral Knowles's Fleet. After locating Admiral Knowles, the Admiral went in search of the Spaniards. The Spanish vessels were found on 1 October 1748. The Spanish lost one ship captured and another burnt later to avoid capture. She returned Home and was surveyed on 2 February 1749 with no repair required and placed in Ordinary.

== Disposition ==
She was reported unfit for further service on 15 November 1755. Under Admiralty Order (AO) 2 April 1756 she was moved to Sheerness and sunk as a breakwater in April 1756.

== Proposed sailing replica ==
In 2013 the Lenox Project (based in Deptford, London, UK) put forward a formal proposal to build a full-size sailing replica of the Lenox, to be constructed at a purpose-built museum on part of the site of the old Deptford Dockyard where the original Lenox was built.

By late 2015 the project had gained momentum, with more detailed plans fitting the building of the Lenox into the overall development of Convoys Wharf, as the old Dockyard site is now known.

If and when completed, the Lenox dock and museum would be within walking distance of the Cutty Sark museum in Greenwich.
