= HMS Kent (1679) =

70-gun third rate ship of the line of the Royal Navy built in the late 17th century

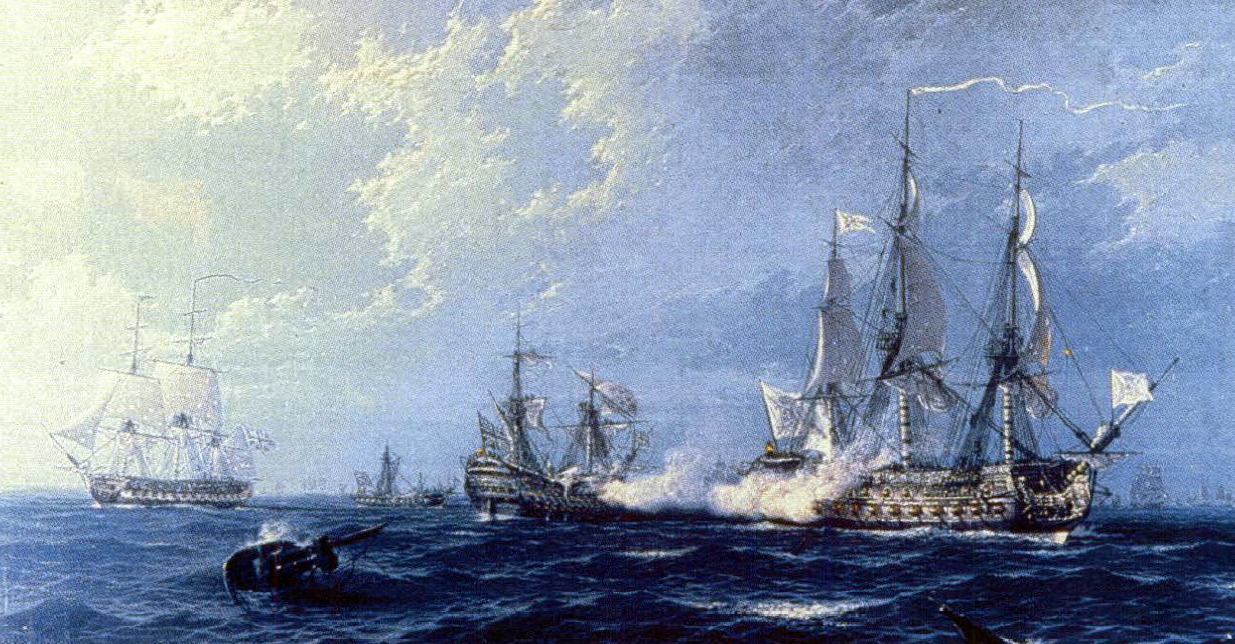
- Battle between the Spanish 70-gun Princesa (right foreground), and HMS Lenox, Orford and Kent, 8 April 1740

History

Kingdom of England
- Name: HMS Kent
- Ordered: 20 February 1678
- Builder: Sir Henry Johnson of Blackwall
- Launched: 1679
- Commissioned: 25 September 1679
- Honours and awards: Barfleur 1692; Vigo 1704; Velez-Malaga 1704; Passero 1718
- Fate: Breaking completed at Chatham December 1744

General characteristics as built
- Class & type: 70-gun third rate ship of the line
- Tons burthen: 1,03975/94 tons (bm)
- Length: 151 ft 0 in (46.02 m) gundeck; 121 ft 5 in (37.01 m) keel for tonnage
- Beam: 40 ft 1.5 in (12.23 m)
- Draught: 18 ft 0 in (5.49 m)
- Depth of hold: 16 ft 9.5 in (5.12 m)
- Propulsion: Sails
- Sail plan: Full-rigged ship
- Armament: 1677 Establishment 72/60 guns; 26 × demi-cannons 54 cwt – 9.5 ft (LD); 26 × 12-pdr guns 32 cwt – 9 ft (UD); 10 × sakers 16 cwt – 7 ft (QD); 4 × sakers 16 cwt – 7 ft (Fc); 5 × 5 3-pdr guns 5 cwt – 5 ft (RH)

General characteristics after 1699 rebuild
- Class & type: 70-gun third rate ship of the line
- Tons burthen: 1,06530/94 tons (bm)
- Length: 151 ft 6 in (46.18 m) gundeck; 123 ft 7.5 in (37.68 m) keel for tonnage
- Beam: 40 ft 3 in (12.27 m)
- Depth of hold: 16 ft 7 in (5.05 m)
- Propulsion: Sails
- Sail plan: Full-rigged ship
- Armament: 1685 Establishment 72/60 guns; 26 × demi-cannons 54 cwt – 9.5 ft (LD); 26 × demi-culverins (UD); 10 × sakers 16 cwt – 7 ft (QD); 4 × sakers 16 cwt – 7 ft (Fc); 5 × 5 3-pdr guns 5 cwt – 5 ft (RH)

General characteristics after 1724 rebuild
- Class & type: 70-gun third rate ship of the line
- Tons burthen: 1,06574/94 tons (bm)
- Length: 151 ft (46.02 m) (gundeck); 122 ft 10 in (37.44 m) keel for tonnage
- Beam: 41 ft 6 in (12.6 m)
- Depth of hold: 17 ft 4 in (5.3 m)
- Propulsion: Sails
- Sail plan: Full-rigged ship
- Complement: 440 personnel
- Armament: 1719 Establishment 70 guns; 26 × 24-pdr guns (LD); 26 × 12-pdr guns (UD); 14 × 6-pdr guns (QD); 4 × 6-pdr guns (Fc)

HMS Kent was a 70-gun third rate ship of the line built by Sir Henry Johnson of Blackwall in 1677/79. She served during the War of English Succession 1699 to 1697, participating in the Battle of Barfleur. She was rebuilt in 1697/99. She served during the War of Spanish Succession 1702 to 1712 and partook in the Battles of Vigo and Velez-Malaga. She partook in the Battle of Passaro then served during the short war with Spain, December 1718 to February 1720. She was rebuilt in 1722/26. She spent the next thirteen years as a guard ship at Portsmouth. In the 1740s, she was off Cape Finisterre then in the West Indies. She returned home and was finally broken in 1744.

She was the second vessel to bear the name Kent since it was used for a 46-gun ship built at Deptford in 1652 with the name Kentish. The ship was renamed Kent in May 1660 and wrecked near Cromer in October 1672.

HMS Kent was awarded the Battle Honours "Barfleur 1692", "Vigo 1702", "Velez-Malaga 1704", and "Passero 1718".

== Construction and specifications ==
She was ordered on 20 February 1678 to be built under contract by Sir Henry Johnson of Blackwall on the River Thames. She was launched in 1679. Her dimensions were a gundeck of 151 feet 0 inches (46.02 metres) with a keel of 121 feet 5 inches (37.01 metres) for tonnage calculation with a breadth of 40 feet 1.5 inches (12.23 metres) and a depth of hold of 16 feet 9.5 inches (5.12 metres). Her builder's measure tonnage was calculated as 1,03975/94 tons (burthen). Her draught was 18 feet 0 inches (5.49 metres).

Her initial gun armament was in accordance with the 1677 Establishment with 70/62 guns consisting of twenty-six demi-cannons (54 cwt, (Note: "cwt", or "hundredweight" refers to the weight of the gun itself.) 9.5 ft) on the lower deck, twenty-six 12-pounder guns (32 cwt, 9 ft) on the upper deck, ten sakers (16 cwt, 7 ft) on the quarterdeck and four sakers (16 cwt, 7 ft) on the foc's'le with four 3-pounder guns (5 cwt, 5 ft) on the poop deck or roundhouse. By 1688 she would carry 70 guns as per the 1685 Establishment, except she had demi-culverins in place of the 12-pounder guns . Her initial manning establishment would be for a crew of 460/380/300 personnel.

== Commissioned service ==
=== Service from 1679 to 1697 ===
HMS Kent was commissioned on 25 September 1679 under the command of Captain John Perryman for delivery to Chatham. After delivery she came under the command of Captain William Fazeby. In 1688 she was under the command of Captain Francis Wheeler followed in 1689 by Captain Edward Good. Under Captain Good she was the Flagship of Vice-Admiral Sir Henry Killigrew commander of the Channel Squadron patrolling off Dunkirk. In July 1690 she was under Captain Peter Pickard followed by Captain John Nevill in 1691. She fought in the Battle of Barfleur in Centre (Red) Squadron, Van Division from 19 to 22 May 1692. She also fought in the Battles off Cherbourg and La Hogue on 23 and 24 May 1692. In 1693 she was under Captain Richard Edwards sailing with the Dunkirk Squadron. Captain John Mayne was her commander in the soundings near the Isles of Scilly during 1695. In 1695 she was under Captain Francis Wyvell followed by Captain Charles Cornwall in 1697. She was paid off in May 1697 for rebuilding at Rotherhithe in 1697/99.

=== Rebuild at Rotherhithe 1697-99 ===
After paying off in May 1697, she was docked at Rotherhithe to be rebuilt under contract by John & Richard Wells. She was completed/launched in March 1697. Her dimensions were a gundeck of 151 feet 6 inches (46.18 metres) with a keel of 123 feet 7.5 inches (37.68 metres) for tonnage calculation with a breadth of 40 feet 3 inches (12.27 metres) and a depth of hold of 16 feet 7 inches (5.05 metres). Her builder's measure tonnage was calculated as 1,06530/94 tons (burthen).

She probably retained her armament as stated in the 1685 Establishment, though it is unclear if her armament was changed to the 1703 Establishment later. It is known that when completed her gun armament total was at least 70 guns.

=== Service from 1699 to 1722 ===
HMS Kent was commissioned in 1699 under the command of Captain John Leake. In 1701 she was under Captain John Jennings. With the outbreak of the War of Spanish Succession in May 1702, she sailed with Admiral Sir George Rooke's Fleet on 19 July for operations at Cadiz, Spain. On the 19th of September, after accomplishing little the Fleet sailed for Home. At Lagos, Portugal they learned that the Spanish Treasure Fleet and its French escort was at Vigo Bay. The Fleet sailed north. On 12 October, twenty-seven ships of the Anglo-Dutch Fleet attacked the ships in Vigo Bay and Rendondela Harbour, Spain (Battle of Vigo). All the French and Spanish vessels were either captured or destroyed.

In 1703, she was under Captain Robert Fairfax as the Flagship of Rear-Admiral Thomas Dilkes. She was at the destruction of a convoy off Avranches on 26 July 1703 and in Cancale Bay on the 28th near St Malo, France. Captain Jonas Hanway had command in 1704, remaining as the Flagship of Rear-Admiral Wilkes. She partook in the capture of the 60-gun Porta Coeli and 60-gun Santa Teresa off Lisbon on 12 March 1704. She sailed into the Mediterranean, participating in the Battle of Velez-Malaga in Center Division on 13 August 1704. During the battle she suffered 15 killed with 26 wounded. Later in August 1704 she was under Captain James Moneypenny. During 1705/06, she was under the command of Captain Sir Thomas Hardy operating with Sir Cloudisley's Fleet in the Mediterranean. She escorted the Lisbon Convoy then sailed with the Fleet to the Soundings near the Isles of Scilly in September/October 1707.

She sailed with Leake's Fleet in 1708 to the Mediterranean then returned to the English Channel. Under Captain Robert Johnson she served with the Main Fleet in 1709/10. She captured the 56-gun Le Superbe on 30 July 1710. Captain Robert Hughes was in command in 1711 for service in the English Channel. She served as the Flagship of Rear-Admiral Sir Thomas Hardy in 1712 in the Soundings near the Isles of Scilly. With the end of the Wars of Spanish Succession, she underwent a great repair at Portsmouth between August 1714 and March 1715 at a cost of 4,689.11.1½d. She followed this by a small repair and fitting for the Mediterranean at Portsmouth at a cost of 5,810.16.4½d in the spring of 1717.

In 1718, she was commissioned under Captain Thomas Mathews. Off Corfu (on the west coast of Greece) in February 1718, she captured the Spanish 64-gun Santa Rosalia. She captured the 60-gun San Carlos at the Battle of Passaro (southernmost point on Sicily) on 11 August 1718. She remained in commission during the short war with Spain (December 1718 to February 1720), then was placed in Ordinary. Her dismantling at Woolwich was completed on 17 March 1722 with the intent of rebuilding.

=== Rebuild at Woolwich Dockyard 1722 to 1726 ===
Plan of HMS Kent's 1724 rebuild

HMS Kent was ordered to be rebuilt at Woolwich Dockyard under the guidance of Master Shipwright John Hayward on 16 February 1722. Her keel was laid on 7 March 1722 and launched on 19 September 1724. Her dimensions were a gundeck of 151 feet 0 inches (46.02 metres) with a keel of 122 feet 10 inches (37.44 metres) for tonnage calculation with a breadth of 41 feet 7 inches (12.67 metres) and a depth of hold of 17 feet 4 inches (5.28 metres). Her builder's measure tonnage was calculated as 1,12974/94 tons (burthen).

Her armament was in accordance with the 1716 Establishment of 70 guns consisting of twenty-six 24-pounder guns on the lower deck, twenty-six 12-pounder guns on the upper deck, fourteen 6-pounder guns on the quarterdeck, and four 6-pounder guns on the foc's'le. Her crew size was established as 440 personnel.

She was completed for Sea at Chatham in May 1726 at a first cost of £16,499.7.1d (Note: A total cost accounting for inflation of approximately £2,825,800 in today's money) to build.

=== Service from 1726 to 1744 ===
HMS Kent was commissioned in 1726 under the command of Captain Charles Hardy for service with Jenning's Fleet. She sailed to the Straits of Gibraltar in October 1726. She was with Wager's Fleet off the coast of Spain in 1727. She was the Flagship of Wager for part of the year. In 1728, Captain Thomas Durell assumed command as guard ship at Portsmouth. Captain Coningsby assumed command in October still as guard ship. In 1729 she was under Captain Christopher O’Brien and was being prepared for service in the Mediterranean; however, she remained as guard ship at Portsmouth in 1730. In 1731, she again was prepared for service in the Mediterranean. She underwent a small repair at Portsmouth costing 1,372.12.0d (Note: A total cost accounting for inflation of approximately £293,200 in today's money) in 1732. She was fitted as a guard ship at Portsmouth then this was changed to service in the English Channel in 1734.

She was commissioned in 1734 under Captain William Davies for service with Norris's Fleet at the Tagus, Portugal. She was paid off in 1736, then underwent a small repair at Portsmouth at a cost of 2,407.7.7d. (Note: A total cost accounting for inflation of approximately £449,100 in today's money) In 1738 she was under the command of Captain Robert Coleman, then reduced to a guard ship at Portsmouth on 28 November 1738. She sailed on 23 July 1739 with Vernon's Squadron off Cape Finisterre in August. October of the same year she was under Captain Thomas Durell, once more. In 1740 she was at sea as part of Vice-Admiral John Balchen's squadron. Lenox, Kent, Oxford, St Albans, and Ripon had been detached to watch for the Spanish Treasure Fleet. The fleet was not found. However, the Spanish 64-gun ship Princesa was sighted at 9am on the 8th of August. In concert with Lenox and Orford, she took the Spanish ship off Cape Finisterre on 8 April 1740. She was with Norris's Fleet off Ferrol in July to September 1740. In 1741 she escorted a convoy to the West Indies in early 1741. Later in the year she was under the command of Captain Cornelius Mitchell. She was involved in operations off Santiago between July and October 1741. She was at Porto Bello in March 1743. Her last action was in 1744, when she bombarded the Spanish at Santiago da Cuba in the West Indies. In 1744, she was under the command of Captain John Simcoe to return to Home Waters to pay off.

== Disposition ==
Under Admiralty Order (AO) 10 May 1743 it was ordered to have a new ship ‘built in her room’. Upon her return she was paid off and broken at Chatham by Admiralty Order (AO) 17 November 1744 with breaking completed in December 1744.
