= HMS Orford (1698) =

Ship of the line of the Royal Navy

History

Great Britain
- Name: HMS Orford
- Ordered: 24 December 1695
- Builder: Edward Snelgrove, Deptford
- Launched: 27 April 1698
- Fate: Wrecked, 13 February 1745

General characteristics as built
- Class & type: 70-gun third rate ship of the line
- Tons burthen: 1051 bm
- Length: 150 ft 5 in (45.8 m) (gundeck)
- Beam: 40 ft 6 in (12.3 m)
- Depth of hold: 17 ft 1 in (5.2 m)
- Sail plan: Full-rigged ship
- Armament: 70 guns as set out in the article

General characteristics after 1713 rebuild
- Class & type: 1706 Establishment 70-gun third rate ship of the line
- Tons burthen: 1,098 bm
- Length: 150 ft (45.7 m) (gundeck)
- Beam: 41 ft (12.5 m)
- Depth of hold: 17 ft 4 in (5.3 m)
- Sail plan: Full-rigged ship
- Armament: 70 guns: Gundeck: 26 × 24 pdrs; Upper gundeck: 26 × 12 pdrs; Quarterdeck: 14 × 6 pdrs; Forecastle: 4 × 6 pdrs

General characteristics after 1727 rebuild
- Sail plan: Full-rigged ship

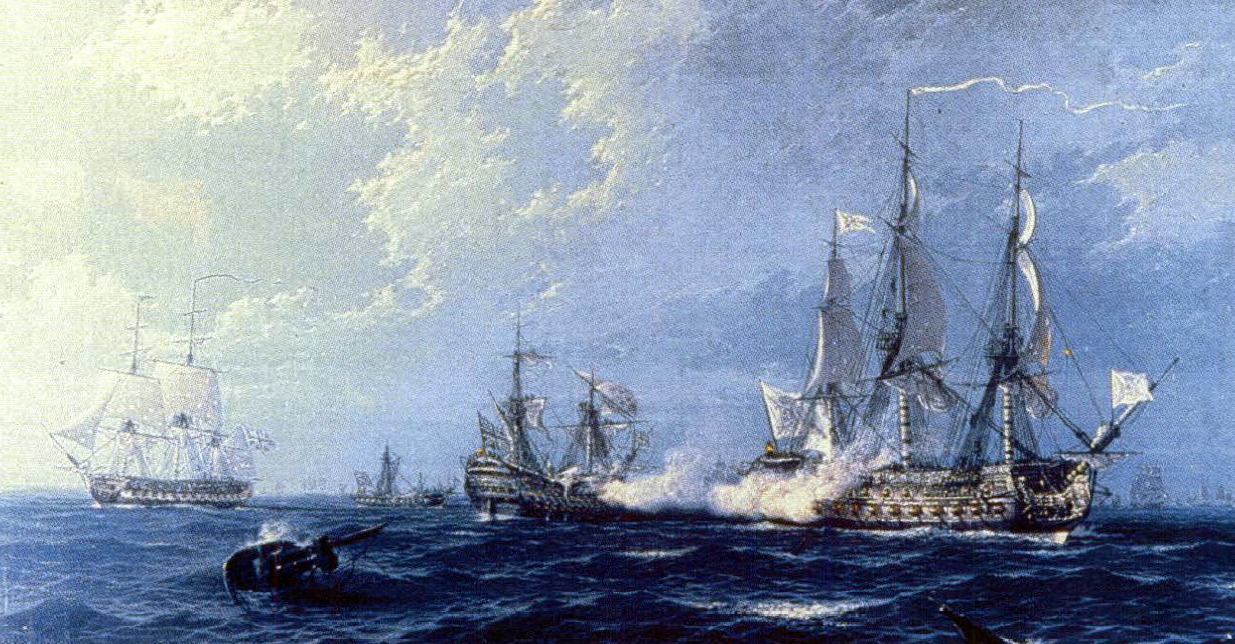
Battle between the Spanish 70-gun Princesa (right foreground) and HMS Lenox, Orford and Kent, 8 April 1740

HMS Orford was a 70-gun third-rate ship of the line of the Royal Navy, launched at Deptford in 1698. She carried twenty-two 24-pounder guns and four (18-pounder) culverins on the lower deck; twenty-six 12-pounder guns on the upper deck; fourteen (5-pounder) sakers on the quarterdeck and forecastle; and four 3-pounder guns on the poop or roundhouse.

In 1704, during the War of the Spanish Succession, Orford served in Admiral Sir George Rooke's fleet in the Mediterranean; she was present as a member of the naval bombardment force at the Capture of Gibraltar. Shortly thereafter, at the Battle of Malaga, commanded by Captain John Norris, Orford was a member of the vanguard division of Rooke's fleet under Admiral Sir Cloudesley Shovell and Vice-Admiral John Leake; all these officers but the latter, who himself became First Lord of the Admiralty in 1710, were future admirals of the fleet.

In 1707, she belonged to Admiral Shovell's fleet. She saw action during the unsuccessful Battle of Toulon and was present during the great naval disaster off the Isles of Scilly when Shovell and four of his ships (Association, Firebrand, Romney and Eagle) were lost, claiming the lives of nearly 2,000 sailors. Orford suffered little to no damage and finally managed to reach Portsmouth. A track of the Orford's route from Cape Spartel to the Isles of Scilly based on the log kept by Lieutenant Anthony Lochard was published by May (1960).

She was rebuilt for the first time according to the 1706 Establishment at Limehouse, relaunching on 17 March 1713. She underwent a second rebuild in 1727.

In 1718 she was present at the Battle of Cape Passaro, and in 1736 she brought John Harrison and his first marine clock back from Lisbon.

Orford was wrecked on 13 February 1745 in the Windward Passage, though all her crew were saved.
