= Sir Charles Knowles, 1st Baronet =

British naval officer, politician and colonial administrator (1704–1777)

Admiral Sir Charles Knowles Bt
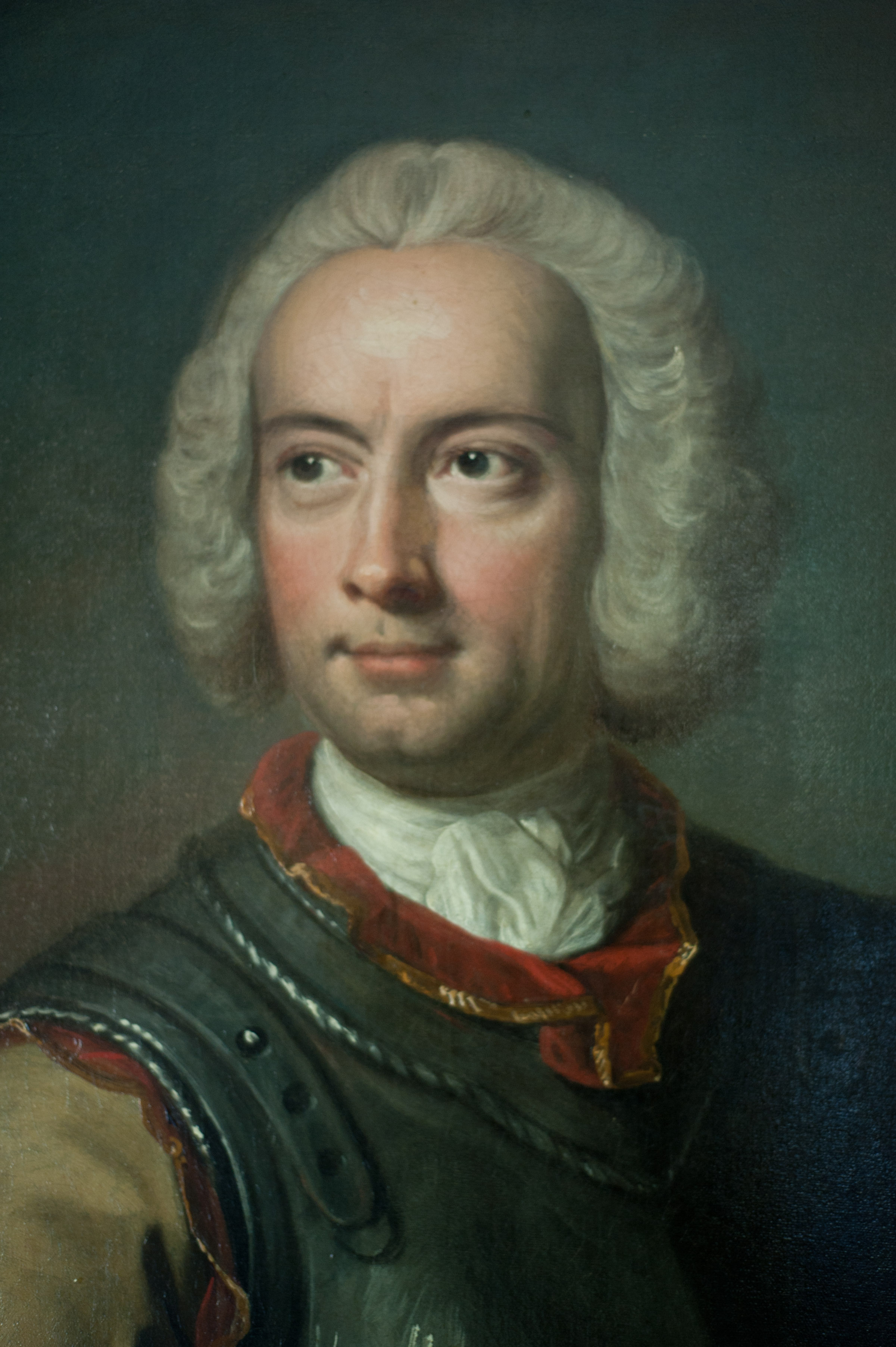
- Portrait by Thomas Hudson, c. 1748
- Born: c. 1704
- Died: 9 December 1777 (aged 72–73); London, England
- Spouse: Mary
- Relatives: Charles Knowles (son); Edward Knowles (son)
- Military career
- Allegiance: Great Britain; Russia
- Branch: Royal Navy; Imperial Russian Navy
- Service years: 1718–1774
- Rank: Admiral (Royal Navy)
- Commands: HMS Diamond; HMS Success; HMS Lichfield; HMS Weymouth; HMS Suffolk; Commander-in-Chief, Barbadoes and Leeward Islands; Commander-in-Chief, Jamaica
- Conflicts: War of the Quadruple Alliance; Battle of Cape Passaro; War of Jenkins' Ear; Battle of Cartagena de Indias; Battle of La Guaira; Battle of Puerto Cabello; Battle of Santiago de Cuba (1748); Battle of Havana (1748); Seven Years' War; Raid on Rochefort

Admiral Sir Charles Knowles, 1st Baronet (c. 1704 – 9 December 1777) was a British naval officer, politician and colonial administrator who served as the governor of Jamaica from 1752 to 1756. Serving in the Royal Navy during the War of Jenkins' Ear, War of the Austrian Succession and Seven Years' War, he also briefly served in the Imperial Russian Navy during the Russo-Turkish War of 1768-1774. Knowles rose to the rank of admiral in a long and varied career, crowned with both success, and at times, controversy.

He was highly educated, and particularly skilled in building and destroying fortifications. His career was mainly centred on the West Indies in the Caribbean Sea, where he commanded ships and squadrons in actions against both Spanish and French ships and settlements. Despite an active naval career in which he reached the rank of Rear-Admiral of Great Britain, Knowles found time to continue his studies. He translated foreign scientific studies, and developed his own inventions. His career at sea was blighted, however, by several failures. This may have been the catalyst for his move to the Russian Empire during the later part of his life to oversee the development of the Russian fleet. He is noted as the catalyst for the Knowles Riot in Boston.

== Family and early life ==
Knowles was probably born c. 1704, though some sources date his birth to as early as 1697. He was reputed to be an illegitimate son of Charles Knowles or Knollys, the titular fourth Earl of Banbury. His education was overseen by his half-brother, Lord Wallingford, and Knowles entered the navy in March 1718, having been recommended to Admiral Sir George Byng by Wallingford. Knowles went aboard one of the ships of Byng's fleet, the 70-gun HMS Buckingham, under Captain Charles Strickland, though he moved in April aboard HMS Lenox as a captain's servant. He remained aboard the Lenox until December 1720, serving with Byng's fleet in the Mediterranean. He was present at the Battle of Cape Passaro on 11 August 1718, where he may have temporarily been aboard Byng's flagship HMS Barfleur.

Knowles was assigned to HMS Lyme in June 1721, initially serving as a servant to Captain Lord Vere Beauclerk and, after the first eighteen months as an able seaman. Knowles remained on the Lyme's books throughout her commission in the Mediterranean, being discharged in June 1726. This appears to have been a titular posting only, and he probably spent most of his time studying ashore. On his return to Britain, Knowles was appointed to serve aboard the guard ship HMS Winchester at Portsmouth, and then Sir Charles Wager's flagship HMS Torbay at Kinsale, under the command of Vere Beauclerk. He served aboard HMS Faversham and HMS Lion until his promotion on 30 May 1730 as lieutenant of the sloop HMS Tryall. He returned to serve aboard the Lion in March the following year, when she went to the West Indies as the flagship of Rear-Admiral Charles Stewart.

== West Indies ==
Having established a reputation as an engineer, after Knowles's return to Britain he was given an advisory and supervisory role in the drawing up of plans for Westminster Bridge. For this project, he travelled to France to study the Pont Neuf in Paris. But the project was assigned for design to another man, and the bridge eventually gave way precisely where Knowles had predicted.

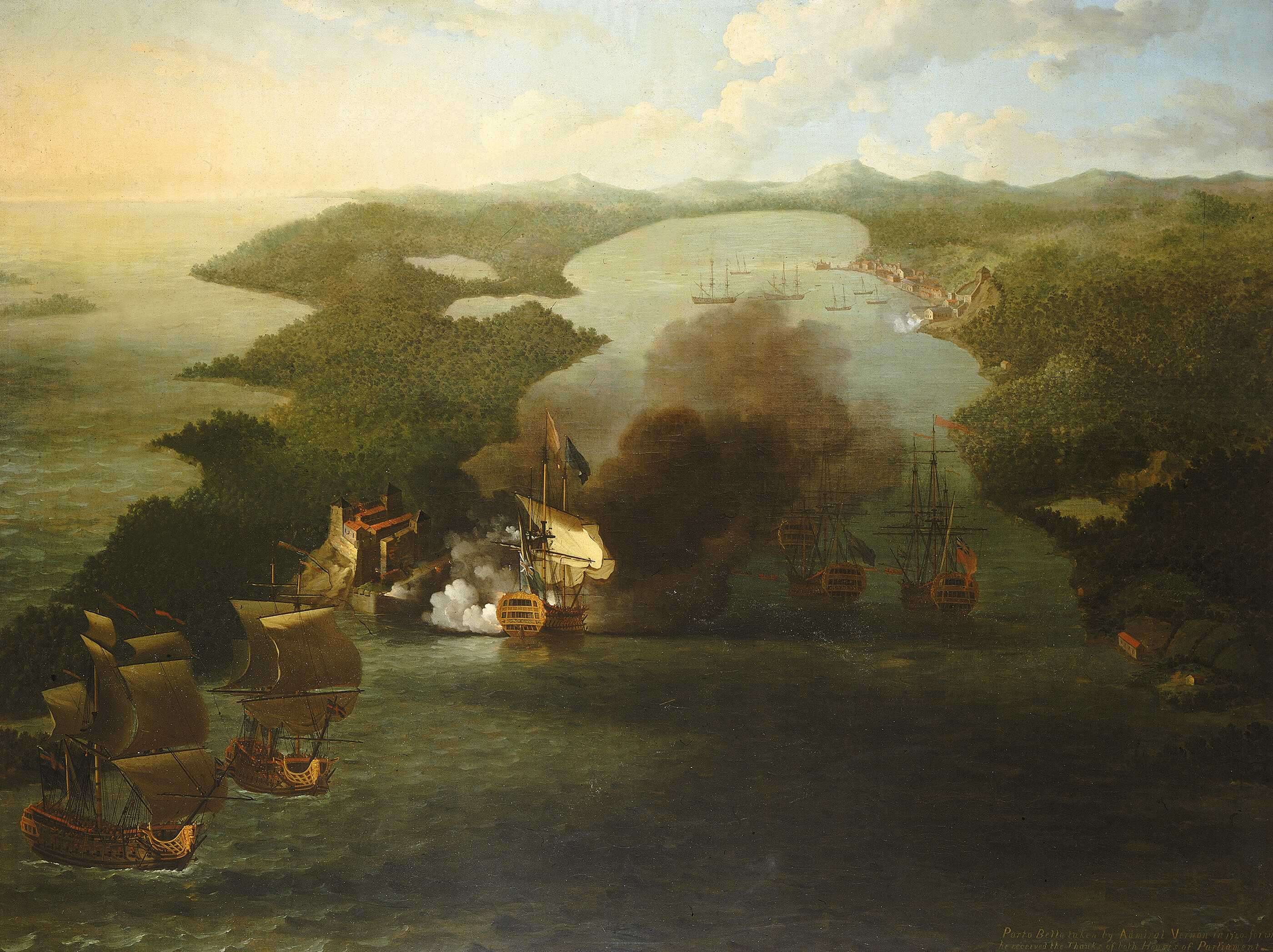
The British capture of Porto Bello. Knowles arrived at the port five days after it was captured.

Knowles had been promoted to commander of the 40-gun HMS Southampton in 1732, but the position appears to have been for rank only, as he did not become post-captain until 4 February 1737, when he was appointed to command HMS Diamond. He was ordered to reinforce Admiral Edward Vernon's West Indies fleet in 1739, as the War of Jenkins' Ear developed. Knowles rendezvoused with the admiral at Port Royal, having captured two Spanish ships en route, one of which was a register ship carrying 120,000 pieces of eight, and clothing for 6,000 men. Knowles was unable to sail with Vernon when he commanded the fleet to Portobelo, but arrived there on 27 November, five days after Vernon's victory in battle. Vernon gave Knowles the task of destroying the Spanish forts. Because of their solid construction, this work took three weeks and 122 barrels of gunpowder. When the task was completed the British withdrew, and Knowles had impressed Vernon with his competent command of land operations.

Vernon next appointed Knowles to cruise off Cartagena, watching the Spanish forces and interdicting any enemy supply ships. Knowles was assigned to the fireship HMS Success and ordered to examine the approaches to the port of Chagres. Having completed the mission and formulated a plan of attack, Knowles was given command of the bomb vessels, fireships and other small boats, and duly bombarded the fortress of San Lorenzo, at the mouth of the Chagres River. The town and castle surrendered on 24 March 1740, and Knowles was appointed Governor of the castle. Vernon ordered the removal of the goods gathered at the port for shipping to Spain, and the sinking of several privateer vessels. Knowles was given the task of demolishing the castle, which he achieved by detonating several mines under the bastions, and burning the apartments. Having completed the task, Vernon's fleet withdrew at the end of March, returning to Port Royal by way of Portobelo.

=== Vernon and the Battle of Cartagena de Indias ===
Knowles spent the next few months cruising, before returning to England in company with HMS Torrington as an escort for a 25 ship strong fleet of merchantmen. Knowles and the Diamond arrived at Spithead on 4 August 1740, shortly after which Knowles took command of the 50-gun HMS Lichfield. He soon moved to command the 60-gun HMS Weymouth, and sailed with her from St Helens Roads on 24 October 1740 as part of Sir Chaloner Ogle's fleet to reinforce Vernon in the West Indies. Knowles formed part of Vernon's council of war on 16 February 1741, which resolved to make a naval and land assault on Cartagena. Vernon placed Knowles in command of the operations to reconnoitre the Spanish defences, and subsequently draw up a plan of attack. Having done this Knowles formed a key part of the early stages of the attack, he stormed and captured one of the forts, captured the Spanish flagship and broke the boom across the entrance to the harbour, allowing the British fleet access.

Several British ships entered the harbour the next day, including Knowles aboard the Weymouth. Under Vernon's orders Knowles destroyed several enemy batteries, captured the Castillo Grande and navigated further into the harbour to cut off enemy supplies. Vernon appointed him governor of Castillo Grande, and ordered him to demolish the fort as the British prepared to evacuate. Knowles duly carried the task out, rendering 59 pieces of ordnance unusable, and carrying off a large amount of lime and limestone. The failure of the British to take Cartagena led to considerable bitterness between the army and naval forces, and Knowles appears to have been the author of a pamphlet published in 1743 entitled An Account of the Expedition to Carthegena, with Explanatory Notes and Observations, a work that criticised the actions of the army. The fleet returned to Jamaica, whereupon Knowles returned to his previous command, the Lichfield. He remained based in the West Indies, and was engaged primarily in strengthening the fortifications and improving the facilities for ships at Port Antonio, Port Royal, and subsequently at Antigua. He is recognised as a minor hero for his engineering services and the Father of Britain's Caribbean naval bases for his exceptional engineering skills. He became a commodore after this, flying his flag aboard HMS Superb and then HMS Severn. Between 1743 and 1745, he served as the second in command on the Jamaica station under Sir Chaloner Ogle, who had replaced Admiral Edward Vernon.

=== Battles of La Guaira and Puerto Cabello ===
Knowles took command of the 70-gun HMS Suffolk in 1742, and in 1743 received orders from Ogle to attack the Spanish settlements of La Guaira and Puerto Cabello. The Spanish governor of Venezuela Gabriel de Zuluaga, well informed of the Royal Navy plans, recruited extra defenders and obtained gunpowder from the Dutch. Consequently, an attack on La Guaira on 2 March 1743 was beaten off by the defenders. Knowles withdrew his force and refitted at Curacao before attempting an assault on Puerto Cabello on 15 April, and again on 24 April, but both assaults were again beaten back. Knowles called off the expedition and returned to Jamaica.

== Governor of Louisbourg ==
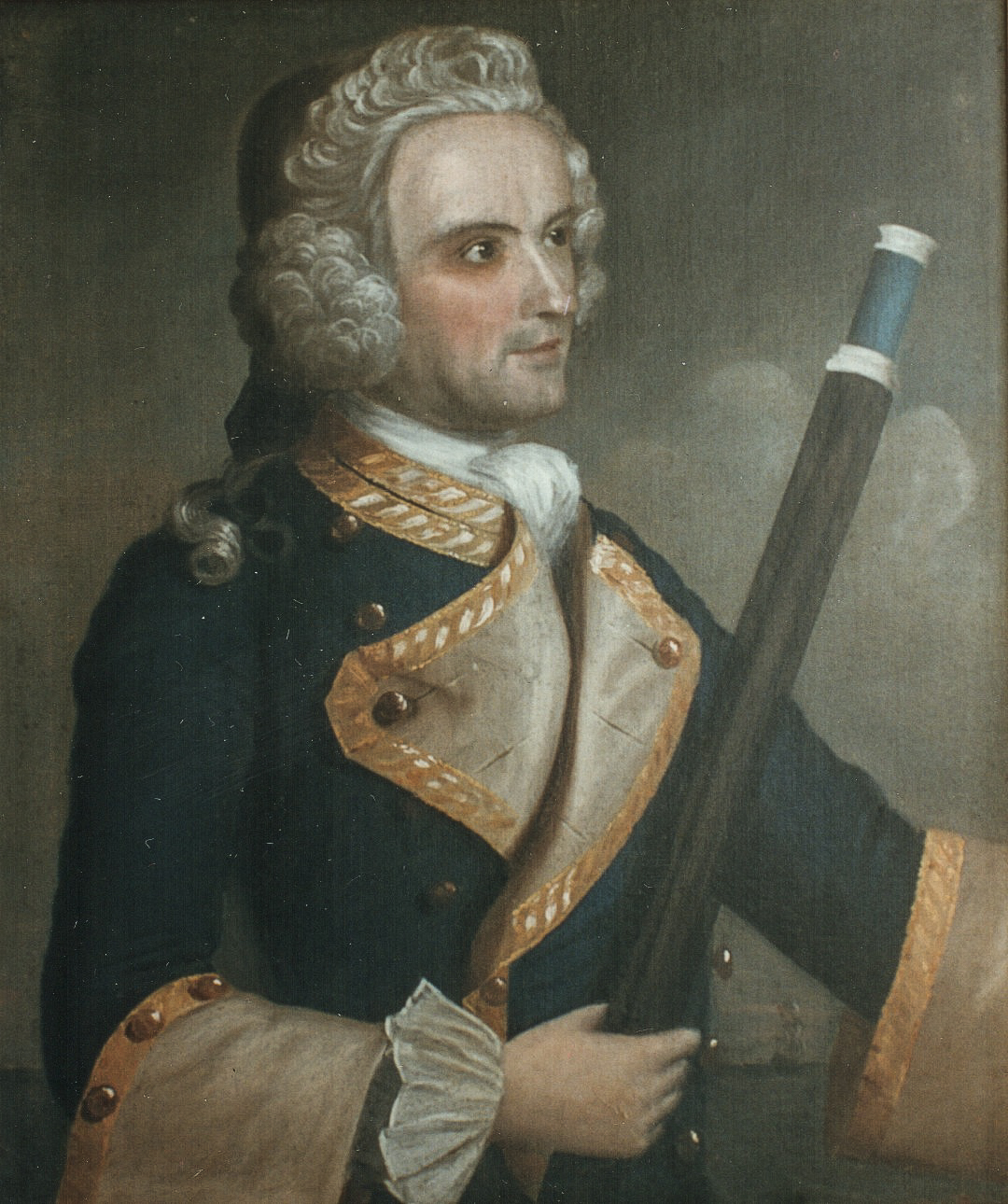
Portrait of Knowles as governor of Louisbourg

Between 1743 and 1745 he captured a large number of prizes, with his success leading to a letter addressed to him and signed by 63 of the principal figures in Jamaica;

Sir, Though we are certain that the public services you have done, and are continually doing, proceed, as they always will, from the noblest principle, and without the least expectation of popular applause; yet, being fully sensible, and having indeed been immediate partakers of them, we should think it an unpardonable neglect at least, if it did not deserve a worse appellation, should we omit to make our joint acknowledgement thereof, &c.

During this period he also found time to design the first British Tower in the west Indies, the 1745 River Fort Barbuda, a very early prototype of the later Martello Tower. Knowles was later appointed as captain of the newly built HMS Devonshire in 1745. He returned to Britain later that year, and in January 1746 he was aboard HMS Canterbury as commander of a squadron in the Downs, under Vice-Admiral William Martin. He was briefly detached to examine French invasion preparations, and on his return in February he captured two French ships. He shifted his pennant to HMS Edinburgh on 21 March, and escorted a convoy from St Helens into the English Channel, after which he moved aboard the 50-gun HMS Norwich.

In spring 1746 he was appointed to take over as governor of Louisbourg from Peter Warren. He sailed for his new post on 31 March 1746, in company with HMS Canterbury and HMS Ruby. He spent nearly two years as governor, and having initially complained to the Duke of Newcastle about the "confused, dirty, beastly condition" of the fortress, was largely engaged in repairing and improving the defences. During this time his troops were involved in one battle, the Battle at Port-la-Joye. Following the brave defence of the garrison at Fort at Number 4 by Capt Phinehas Stevens in 1747 against the French militia and Abenaki warriors, Knowles was so impressed that he presented Stevens with “as costly and elegant a sword as could be procured in Boston”. Afterwards, the township was named Charlestown in honour of Charles Knowles. He was promoted to rear-admiral of the white on 15 July 1747, and appointed as commander in chief on the Jamaica Station. On taking up his new post he raised his flag aboard HMS Canterbury, but soon shifted it to HMS Cornwall. He had initially intended to take his squadron and attack Santiago de Cuba, but contrary winds led to him deciding instead to attack Fort Saint Louis de Sud. He arrived on 8 March 1748, and after subjecting the fort to a heavy bombardment forced its surrender. Knowles was promoted to rear-admiral of the red on 12 May 1748. He returned to Santiago de Cuba on 5 April and carried out another attack, but was unable to capture the port, and duly returned to Jamaica.

== Battle of Havana ==
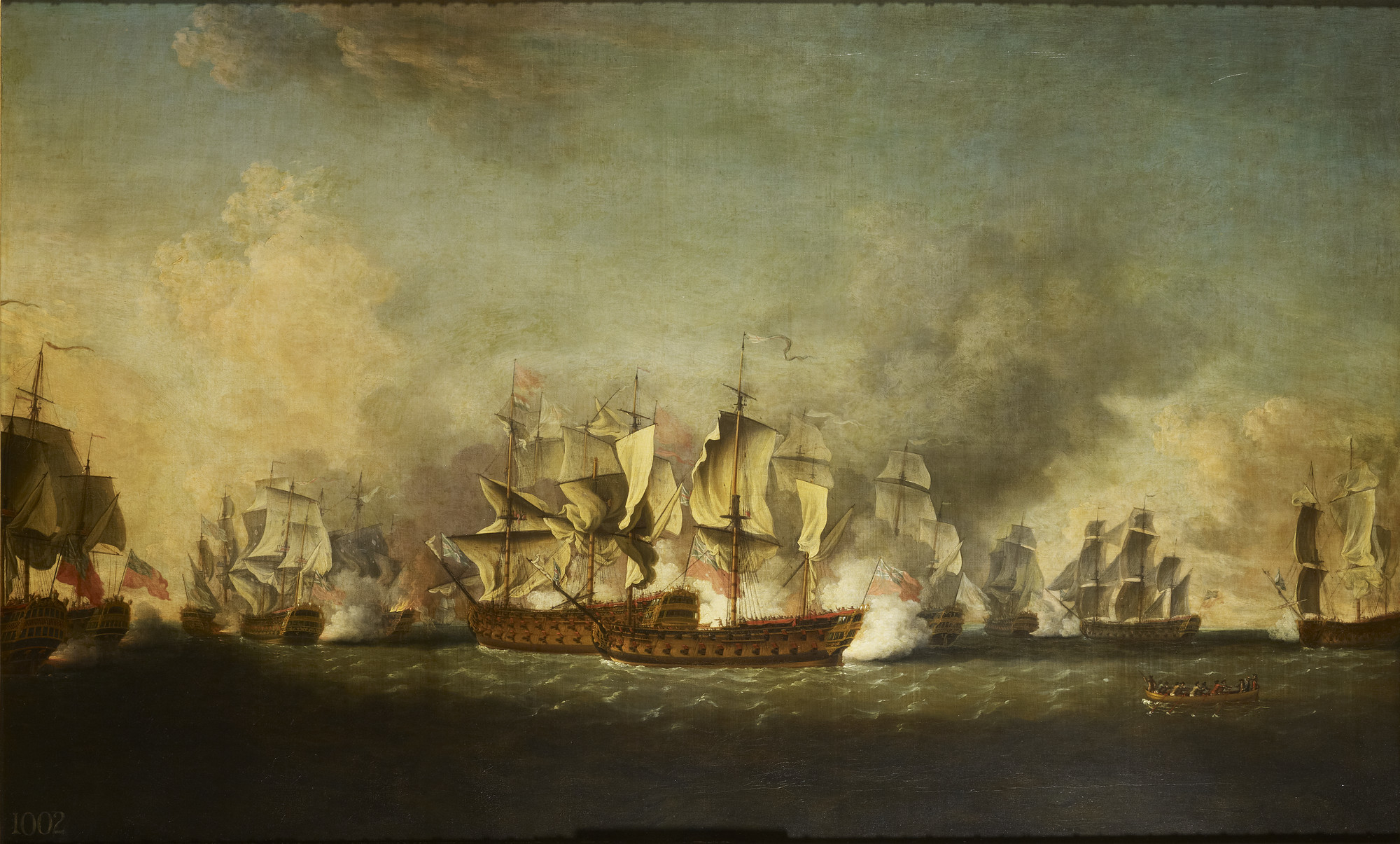
The Battle of Havana, at which Knowles won a partial victory

After having his ships refitted Knowles sailed on a cruise, hoping to intercept a Spanish treasure fleet off Cuba. On 30 September he fell in with HMS Lenox, under Captain Charles Holmes, who reported that he had encountered a Spanish fleet some days earlier. The fleet was sighted the next morning but confusion over signals and a struggle to keep the weather gauge meant that the British fleet failed to attack in an organised manner. Though the Battle of Havana ended with the capture of one Spanish ship and another being badly damaged, it was not the major British victory hoped for. Knowles was accused of badly mismanaging the action and faced a court martial in December 1749. The result was a reprimand for the poor tactics he employed, while several of the other captains involved were also reprimanded. There was considerable bad feeling between Knowles and his subordinates, and several challenges to duel were issued. In once instance, Knowles exchanged shots with Holmes, and in another two of his captains, Innes and Clarke, duelled, which resulted in Innes being mortally wounded. King George II eventually intervened to forbid any further duels over the matter.

== Governor of Jamaica ==
Knowles was briefly Member of Parliament for Gatton between 1749 and 1752, and in 1752 he was appointed Governor of Jamaica. In 1754, the Maroons of Crawford's Town rose up in revolt, and Knowles put down the rebellion, defeating and capturing its leader, Quao. The Maroon town, Charles Town, Jamaica took the first name of Knowles in gratitude for the governor's help in suppressing the revolt. Over his four-year period as governor he took steps to reform the legal system, and also moved the administrative capital from Spanish Town to Kingston, arguing that the latter was more defensible.

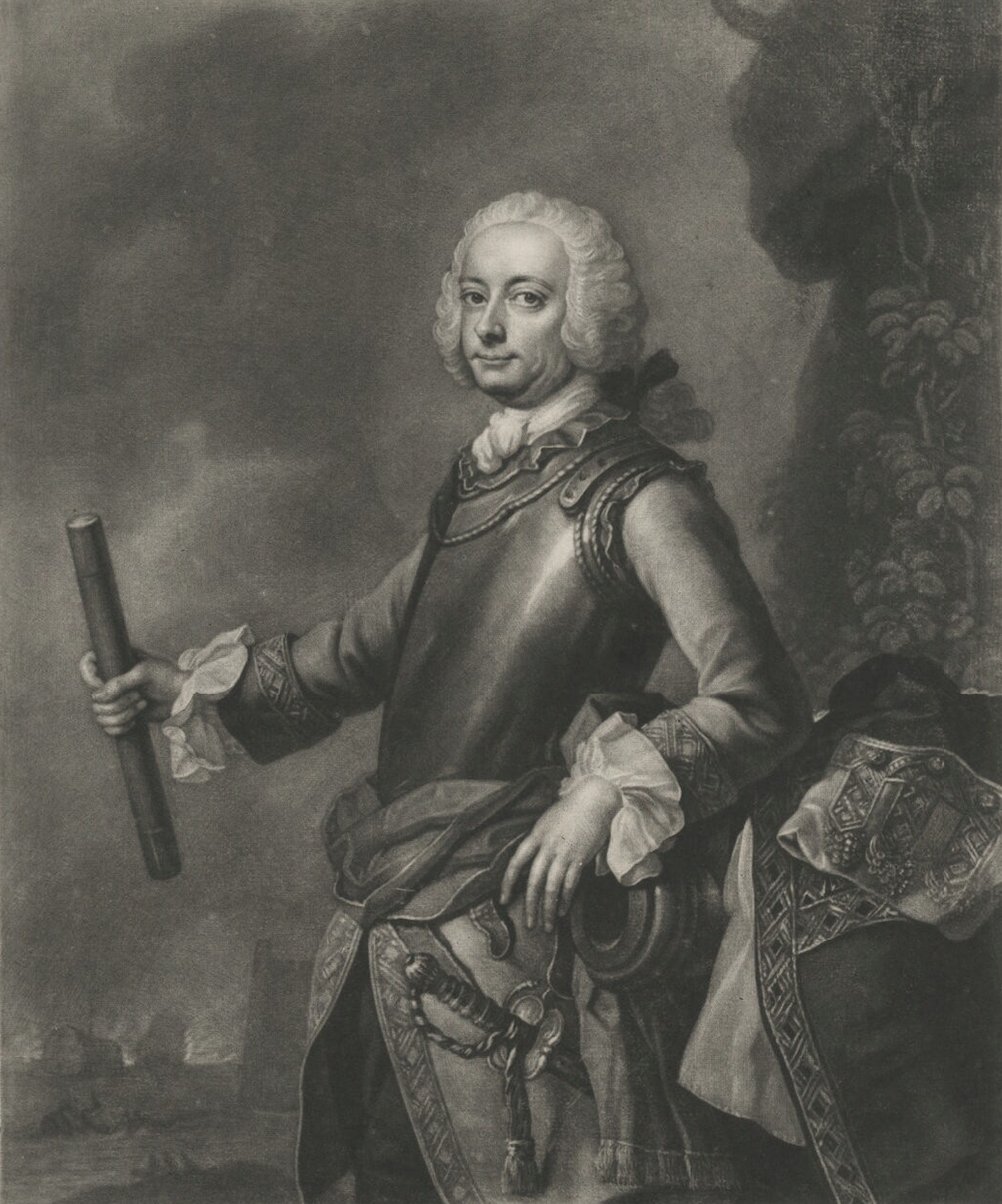
1755–1756 engraving of Knowles

Knowles' attempts to ensure the subordination of the Jamaican Assembly to the British government led to calls for his removal as governor, but his policies were subsequently upheld by the British government. The Assembly had the last word however, and Knowles resigned the governorship in January 1756 and returned to England. There was a lot of celebration in Jamaica, as the planters in the Assembly re-established Spanish Town as the capital of the island colony. He had been promoted to vice-admiral of the red on 4 February 1755. On his return from Jamaica, it was proposed to create him a Knight of the Bath, or raise him to an Irish Peerage, but he declined both these honours, though subsequently he accepted a baronetcy.

In 1756 the governor of Cuba Francisco Cajigal de la Vega officially invited Knowles to visit Havana, the strongest military base in Spanish America. Knowles accepted the offer with pleasure and spent much of the visit memorising details of Havana's defences. He subsequently drew up plans for the capture of Havana and submitted them to William Pitt the Elder, which the latter probably laid before the British cabinet at the time of his resignation as British Prime Minister. By 1761 Knowles had shown his plans to the Duke of Cumberland, who championed the idea and wrote to the commander of the British expedition against Cuba sent in 1762, the Earl of Albemarle: "I dread the loss of one single day at present and that not the less for Knowles’ company, who is here croaking every day at dinner. Any bystander would think me the projector and fitter out of the expedition". The expedition captured Havana in August 1762. Knowles successfully took the novelist, Tobias Smollett to court for libel, as the editor of The Critical Review, resulting in a fine and imprisonment for three months.

== Later service and Russia ==
Knowles was second in command under Admiral Edward Hawke in the raid on Rochefort in 1757, during the Seven Years' War, with Knowles flying his flag aboard HMS Neptune. Knowles oversaw a bombardment, but the expedition was judged a failure, and Knowles was one of the figures subsequently criticised for his actions. He defended himself with the publication of a pamphlet entitled The Conduct of Admiral Knowles on the late Expedition set in a true light. The pamphlet was unfavourably reviewed by Tobias Smollett in The Critical Review, in terms that led to Knowles successfully suing Smollett for libel. Knowles briefly flew his flag aboard HMS Royal Anne in the winter of 1757, but the debacle at Rochefort meant he was soon removed from active service. In the war of 1758 Knowles was offered £20,000 by the French government for his recipe for curing beef and pork but he refused to sell to the French or to receive any compensation from his government. The subsequent publication of this recipe caused an entire revolution in the method of preparing beef and pork for sea use in the prevention of scurvy. He was promoted to full admiral on 3 December 1760, and was created a baronet on 31 October 1765. He became Rear-Admiral of Great Britain on 5 November 1765.

=== Admiral of the Russian Fleet ===
He resigned from the navy in 1770 and accepted an appointment from Catherine of Russia as a first admiral in her fleet with a seat in her Council at the Highest Court of the Russian Empire to advise on the development and revitalisation of the Imperial Russian Navy, which was then in a deplorable state, during the war against Turkey. Twenty years later a pamphlet lamented “our permitting Sir Charles Knowles to act for that ambitious and formidable state in the capacity of lord high admiral, at a time when his abilities might have turned to great account in his native country." Amongst other reasons for going, he saw the possibilities of a new Anglo-Russian alliance to balance a Spanish French compact. He served in a mainly administrative role as “General Intendant” the highest position on the administration of all the wharfs, ship construction, workers, and supplies in all ports of the Empire, being based at St Petersburg until 1774, when he returned to England. By the time he left Russia, he had presented Catherine with an impressive array of achievements: a detailed plan for rebuilding the navy along English lines, plus at least five new warships... ....the Ezekial of 80 guns “esteemed the finest ship in the navy” built to his own design...and under his supervision, launched after 8.5 months, while usually it took up to 5 years to build a ship of a similar class....a black sea squadron that had achieved permanent paramountcy over the Turks, a reconstructed dry dock, and a new canal for the fraction of the anticipated cost....

In 1773 he introduced steam technology from Scotland to pump water from the dry dock at Kronstadt a full 26 years before the British Admiralty were persuaded to try out a steam engine at Portsmouth. It was his insistence on the use of a steam engine pump which had a significant impact on the growth of interest of steam application to all facets of Russian industrial life. Sir John Jervis and Captain Samuel Barrington visited Russia in the early 1770s where they spent time in Saint Petersburg and inspected the arsenal and dockyards at Kronstadt and took a tour of the yacht designed by Knowles for Catherine of Russia. Amongst articles devoted to outstanding military figures in the immense and distinguished Military Encyclopaedia of Sytin (the common unofficial name of the multi-volume 'Military Encyclopaedia' published by Ivan Sytin in St Petersburg 1911–1915) his departure is described as undoubtable a major loss to their fleet. The Naval Chronicle called him the Father of the Russian Navy.

== Family and personal life ==
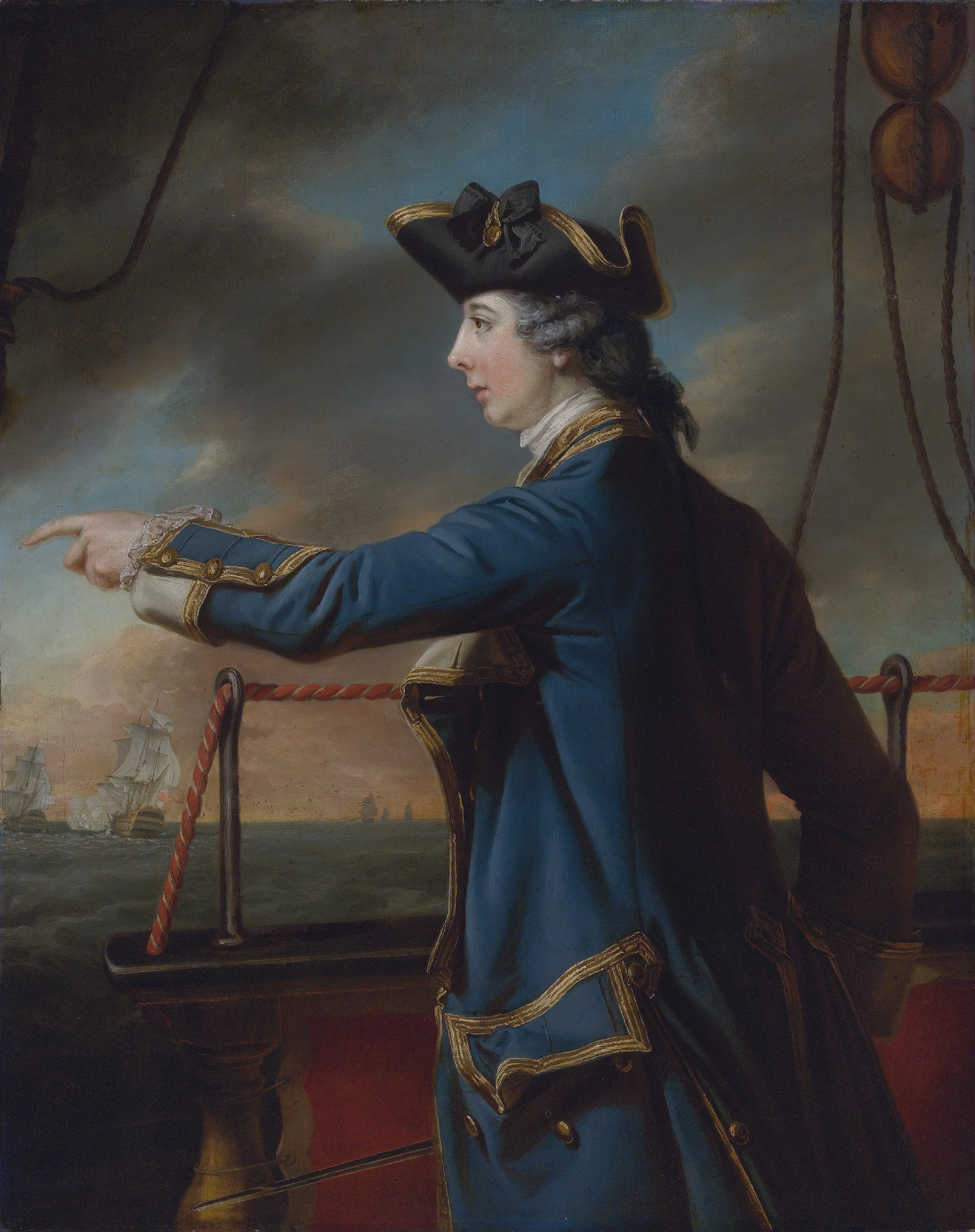
Knowles' first son Edward

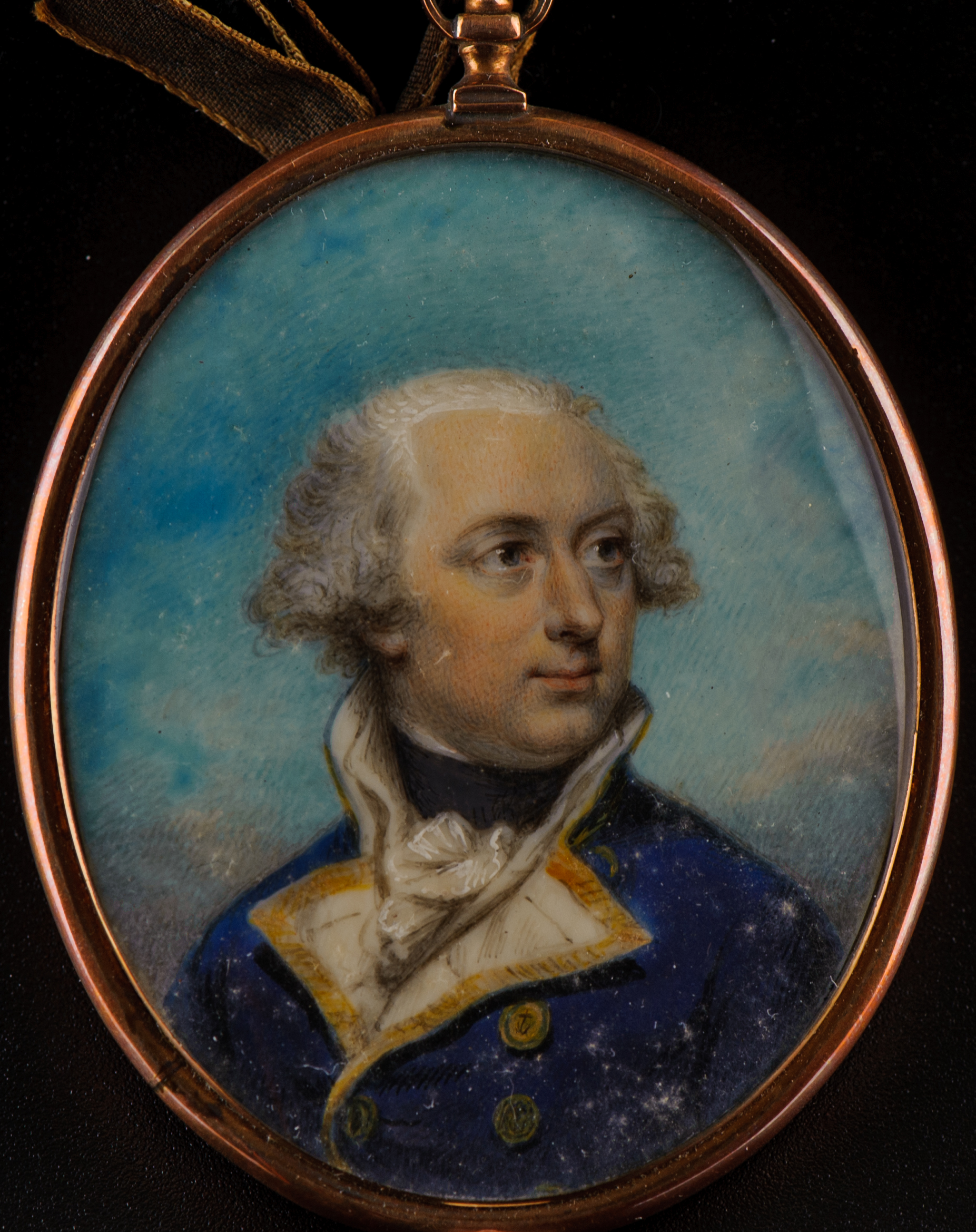
Knowles' second son Charles

Knowles married Mary, the sister of Rebecca, wife of William Bouverie, 1st Earl of Radnor, and Sir John Alleyne, later a Speaker of the Barbados House of Assembly, on 23 December 1740. The marriage produced a son, Edward Knowles, who followed his father into the navy, but was lost when his vessel, the sloop HMS Peregrine foundered in 1762. He married in 1750 for the second time, Maria Magdalena Therese de Bouget (1733–1796), the daughter of Henri Francois, Compte de Bouget. The couple produced one son, Charles Knowles, and two daughters, one of whom, Anna Charlotte Christiana Knowles (1752–1839) m 1781 Captain John Winder of the Kings Dragoon Guards.

He translated M. de la Croix's Abstract of the Mechanisms of the Motions of Floating Bodies in 1775, noting in his preface that he had carried out experiments that validated de la Croix's findings and adding “…but what proved most satisfactory to me was their answering perfectly well when put into practice, in several line of battle ships and frigates, that I built whilst in Russia.”. He also invented a device for measuring the pressure and velocity of wind, a fact acknowledged by Leonhard Euler as having been discovered before him.

In writing to Admiral Anson about ship construction, masts, sails, rigging and the treatment of timber in the dockyards he anticipated much of what Kempenfelt was to say nearly forty years later.

In 1744, William Montagu, a relative of the Earl of Sandwich, discharged a firearm indiscriminately into a boat crewed by Black slaves, one of whom was fatally wounded by William. After learning of the incident, Knowles ordered an unperturbed William back home to face a court-martial. In the Seven Years' War, Knowles was offered £20,000 by the French government for his recipe for curing beef and pork but he refused to sell to the French or to receive any compensation from the British government. The subsequent publication of this recipe caused an entire revolution in the method of preparing beef and pork for sea use in the prevention of scurvy. In 1758, an anonymous pamphlet by Philo Nautilus attributed to Knowles “outlined perhaps the most utopian plan ever proposed to solve Britain’s naval manning problem” He proposed a plan to solve the navy's recruiting problem by building hundreds of low rent houses for navy men and their families at dockyards. If implemented, the plan would have dramatically reduced the navy's dependence on impressment. Also attributed to Knowles is AN ESSAY ON THE DUTY and QUALIFICATIONS OF A SEA-OFFICER. Written originally for the Use of TWO YOUNG OFFICERS. 1765 Printed for W. JOHNSTON, in Ludgate-street with profits to the Magdalene and British Lying-in-Hospital. Knowles remained intellectually active until the end, writing months before his death to The Reverend Charles William Tonyn “I must beg you will not give yourself any trouble about seeking for a person to copy my manuscript as I wished for one at that time more for your nephew than myself. He not being able before he want to copy one quarter part of only one volume & I fear I have a heavier task to perform in arranging my crude ideas than I was aware on before I shall want to have them copied. Many of my experiments want repeating before I can venture to publish them; and before I can do this I must find not only an able algebraist & mathematical man, but one used to experiments of the nicest kind, as well as calculation, who must be with me & give me his time. In short live with me. Such a One I should be glad to find, & make a companion of.” His family found that he had left no personal papers at his death, although a reason suggests itself in an intriguing letter from Jeremy Bentham to his son “ Blanket a 2d Lieutt on board the Victory …was intimate with Ad Knowles and was over with him one summer in Russia. He was with him when he died got a great many of his papers and regrets that he did not get more.“ John Blankett, later Admiral, shared Knowles' views on ties with Russia having compiled a detailed report for the Admiralty advocating a close alighnment with Russia following a visit to St Petersburgh after the Peace in 1763.

His posthumous reputation is suggested in “Plain suggestions of a British seaman” 1794, 4: “We had not in England a man more thoroughly conversant in nautical affairs, or who better considered the interest of our navy” Charlestown, New Hampshire and Charles Town, Jamaica are named after him. He died at Bulstrode Street, London on 9 December 1777, and was buried at Guildford, Surrey.

== See also ==
- Knowles Riot
- Knowles Baronets
- Knollys family

== Notes ==
Military offices
New office Île-Royale seized from French governor Antoine Le Moyne de Châteauguay	Governor of Louisbourg; 1745–1747	Succeeded by Peregrine Hopson
Preceded by Digby Dent	Commander-in-Chief, Jamaica Station; 1747–1749	Succeeded by Polycarpus Taylor acting
Parliament of Great Britain
Preceded by George Newland; Paul Humphrey	Member of Parliament for Gatton; 1749–1752; With: Paul Humphrey (1749–1751); Sir James Colebrooke, Bt (1751–1752)	Succeeded by William Bateman; Sir James Colebrooke, Bt
Government offices
Preceded by Edward Trelawny	Governor of Jamaica; 1752–1756	Succeeded by Henry Moore
Honorary titles
Preceded by Edward Hawke	Rear-Admiral of Great Britain; 1765–1770	Succeeded by Francis Holburne
Baronetage of Great Britain
New title	Baronet (of Lovell Hill); 1765–1777	Succeeded by Charles Knowles
