= Maurice Thompson, 2nd Baron Haversham =

Maurice Thompson, 2nd Baron Haversham (1675 – 11 April 1745), styled The Honourable Maurice Thompson between 1696 and 1710, was a British soldier and politician.

Thompson was the son of John Thompson, 1st Baron Haversham, by Lady Frances Annesley, daughter of Arthur Annesley, 1st Earl of Anglesey. He fought at the siege of Namur in 1695, where he was wounded. The same year he was returned to Parliament for Bletchingley, a seat he held until 1698, and then represented Gatton until 1705. In 1710 he succeeded his father in the barony and entered the House of Lords. Between 1717 and 1718 he was a Treasurer of Excise.

Lord Haversham married firstly Elizabeth Smith, daughter of John Smith. They had at least two daughters. After Elizabeth's death in 1712 he married secondly his first cousin the Honourable Elizabeth Annesley, daughter of Richard Annesley, 3rd Baron Altham, in 1737. There were no children from this marriage. Lord Haversham died in April 1745. As he had no sons his titles died with him. Lady Haversham later remarried and died in November 1772.

Parliament of England
Preceded by Thomas Howard; Sir Robert Clayton	Member of Parliament for Bletchingley; 1695–1698; With: Thomas Howard	Succeeded by Sir Edward Gresham, Bt; John Ward
Preceded by Thomas Turgis; George Evelyn	Member of Parliament for Gatton; 1698–1705; With: Thomas Turgis 1698–1702; Thomas Onslow 1702–1705	Succeeded by Sir George Newland; Paul Docminique
Peerage of England
Preceded by John Thompson	Baron Haversham; 1710–1745	Extinct
