= John Thompson, 1st Baron Haversham =

English politician

John Thompson, 1st Baron Haversham (c. 1648 – 1 November 1710), known as Sir John Thompson, Bt, between 1673 and 1696, was an English politician.

Thompson was the son of Maurice Thomson (1601/4-1676), of St Andrew, Eastcheap, City of London and Haversham, "England's greatest colonial merchant of his day", who at one time obtained a monopoly of the Virginia tobacco trade. His mother was Dorothy Vaux, daughter of John Vaux, of Pembrokeshire. He was High Sheriff of Buckinghamshire between 1669 and 1670 and was created a Baronet, of Haversham in the County of Buckingham, in 1673. In 1685 he was returned to Parliament for Gatton, a seat he held until 1696, when he was raised to the peerage as Baron Haversham, of Haversham in the County of Buckingham. Between 1699 and 1701 he was a Lord of the Admiralty.

Lord Haversham married firstly Lady Frances Annesley, daughter of Arthur Annesley, 1st Earl of Anglesey, and widow of Francis Wyndham, in 1688. They had at least eleven children. After her death in March 1705 he married secondly Martha Graham, a widow, in 1709. There were no children from this marriage. Lord Haversham died at Richmond in November 1710 and was succeeded in his titles by his son, Maurice. Lady Haversham died in 1724.

Parliament of England
Preceded by Thomas Turgis; Sir Nicholas Carew	Member of Parliament for Gatton; 1685–1696; With: Thomas Turgis	Succeeded by Thomas Turgis; George Evelyn
Baronetage of England
New creation	Baronet (of Haversham); 1673–1710	Succeeded by Maurice Thompson
Peerage of England
New creation	Baron Haversham; 1696–1710	Succeeded by Maurice Thompson
