= Edward Knowles =

Edward Knowles may refer to:

- Edward Knowles (rugby), English rugby union and rugby league player
- Edward Knowles (Royal Navy officer)
- Edward P. Knowles, mayor of Providence, Rhode Island
