= Paul Docminique =

British merchant and Tory politician (1643–1735)

Paul Docminique (1643–1735), of Spitalfields, London, and Chipstead, Surrey, was a British merchant and Tory politician who sat in the House of Commons from 1705 to 1735.

== Early life ==
Docminique was of Huguenot origin. He was baptized on 15 January 1643, the eldest son of Paul Docminique from Lille, France and of Stepney, Middlesex, and his wife Marie Tordereaux from Valenciennes, France. He was naturalized in 1662 and succeeded his father after 1667. He married Alice Edwards, daughter of William Edwards, Clothworker, of London and Newbury, Berkshire, on 22 December 1674. She had died by 1686, when he married as his second wife her cousin Margaret Edwards (died 1734), daughter of Rev. Robert Edwards of Kibworth Beauchamp, Leicestershire.

== Career ==
Docminique was director of the Company of Scotland from 1695 to 1696 and became Commissioner for taking subscriptions to the land bank in1696. He was governor of the White Paper Makers’ Company in 1697. In 1704 he purchased Upper Gatton and the manor of Chipstead in Surrey which had control of one parliamentary seat at Gatton.

Docminique was returned unopposed as Tory Member of Parliament for Gatton at the 1705 English general election. He was returned again in 1708 and 1710 He was president of the Society of New Jersey proprietors for 1711 to 1712. At the 1713 general election he was returned at Gatton unopposed again. In 1714. on the accession of George I, he was appointed a Lord of Trade at the age of 71.

Docminique was returned as MP for Gatton again at the 1715 general election and voted with the Administration in all recorded divisions. He was returned again in 1722 and in the following parliament made his only reported speeches which were on the allowances to be made to the South Sea directors and officials from their confiscated estates on 21 June 1721, on the army estimates on 22 January 1724, and on a petition from the victims of one of the 1720 bubbles on 21 February 1724. He was returned for Gatton again in 1727 and 1734.. He was one of the most constant attenders at the Board of Trade and continued to participate in meetings of the board until 12 March 1735.

== Death and legacy ==
Docminique died aged 92 on 17 March 1735. He had three sons of whom one predeceased him, and a daughter who predeceased him. His son Charles Docminique was also MP for Gatton.

Parliament of Great Britain
Preceded by Hon. Maurice Thompson; Thomas Onslow	Member of Parliament for Gatton; 1705–1735; With: Sir George Newland 1705-1710; William Newland 1710-1735	Succeeded by William Newland; Charles Docminique
