= Knowles Riot =

1747 riot in Boston, Massachusetts, U.S.

- Part of King George's War and the War of Jenkins' Ear
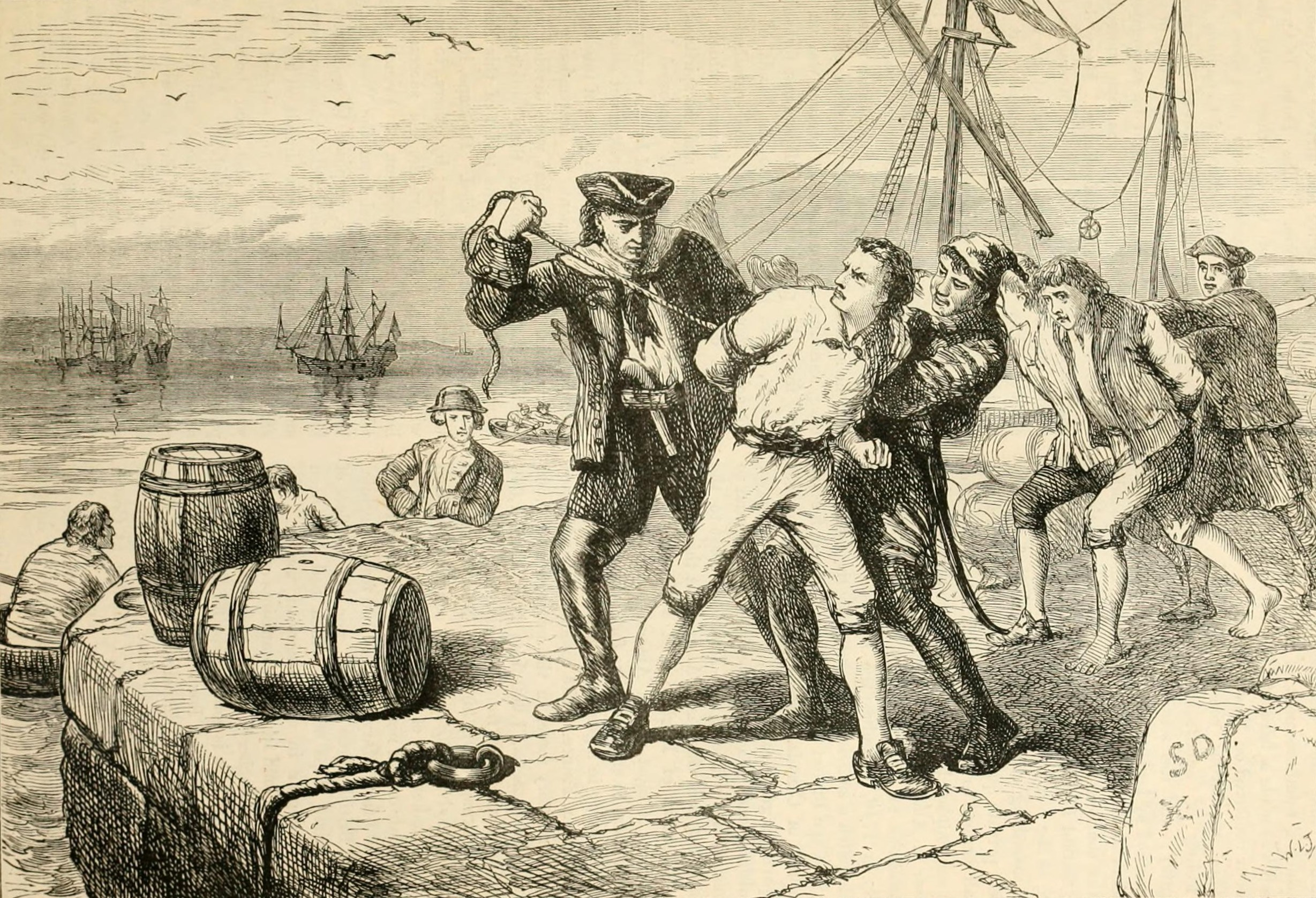
- 1874 illustration of the impressment that led to the riot
- Date: 17–19 November 1747
- Location: Boston, Massachusetts, Thirteen Colonies
- Caused by: Impressment
- Result: Release of the Bostonians; 11 arrests

Parties
American colonists	Royal Navy	Local authorities

Casualties
- Death: 0

The Knowles Riot, also known as the Impressment Riot of 1747, was a three-day riot in Boston (then part of the British Province of Massachusetts Bay) which began on 17 November 1747, in response to the impressment of 46 Bostonians by Rear-Admiral of the White Charles Knowles into the Royal Navy. Hundreds of mostly working class rioters rampaged through Boston, paralyzed the colonial government, and captured several naval officers and the sheriff's deputy. After Knowles threatened to bombard the town, the governor of Massachusetts, William Shirley, persuaded him to release the Bostonians in exchange for the hostages.

The riot was the largest ever impressment riot in North America, and the most serious incident of unrest by colonists in British America prior to the protests over the Stamp Act 1765. A few days after the incident, an anonymous writer—probably Samuel Adams—published a pamphlet praising the rioters for defending their natural rights. This was the first time the ideas of John Locke were used to justify resistance to the authority of the Crown in the American colonies.

== Background ==
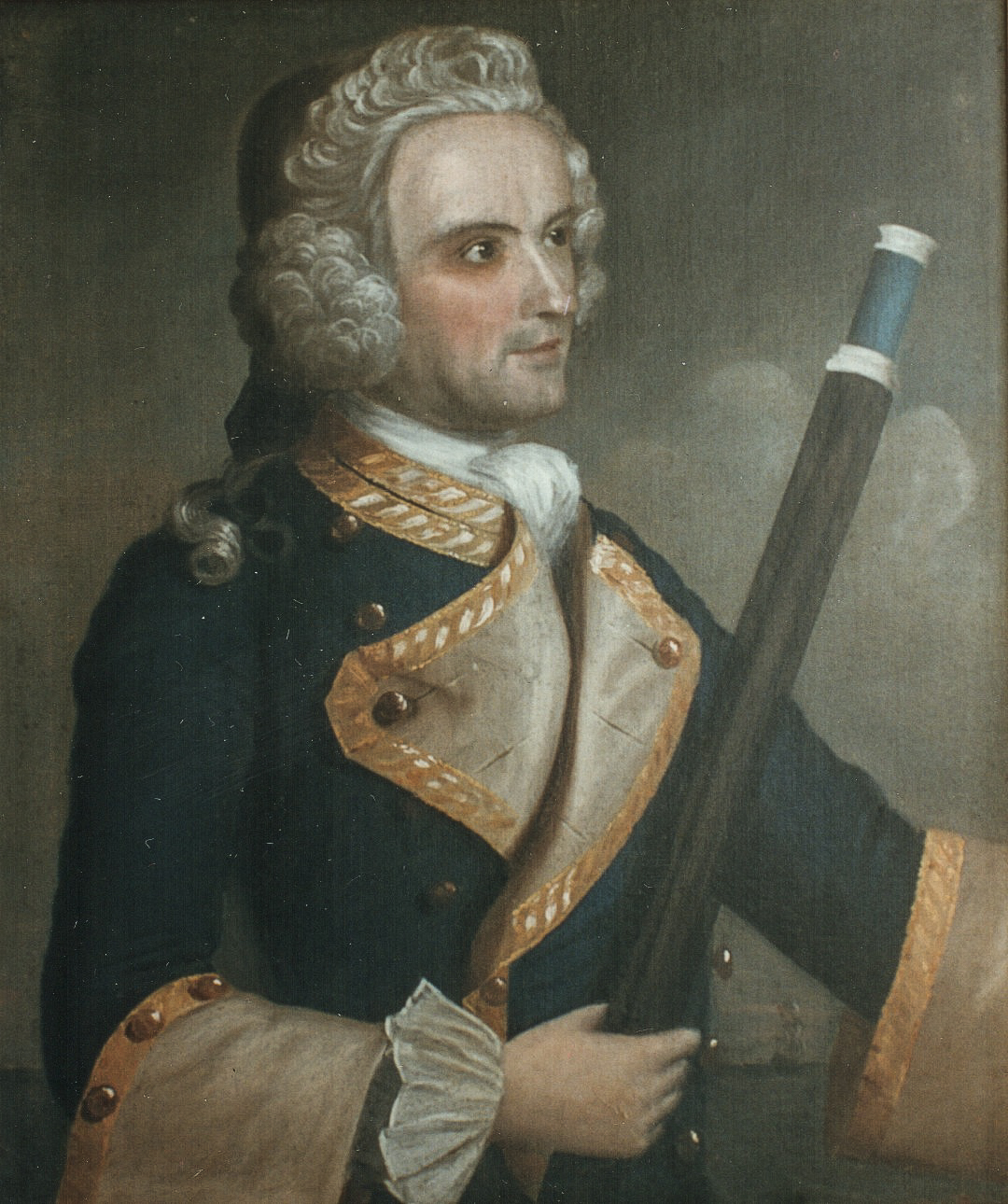
Charles Knowles, who provoked the riot

During the War of the Austrian Succession, the Royal Navy again expanded its domestic use of impressment: the practice of forcing men, usually sailors, into naval service. A captain who found himself shorthanded would send a press-gang, armed with cudgels and cutlasses, onto a merchant ship to capture sailors for his own crew, often with the cooperation of local authorities. Those who were impressed remained in the Royal Navy for three years or until they were discharged, escaped or died. Men at risk of impressment resented the practice for the same reasons that made recruiting difficult in the first place: the work was hard and dangerous, and for skilled sailors especially, the wages were low. Sometimes they resisted, and several riots ensued in England over impressment.

In the Thirteen Colonies, British law governing impressment had been different and became subject to dispute; by the Trade to America Act 1707 (6 Ann. c. 64 s. 9) Parliament had exempted those in the American colonies from impressment, but it later claimed that the exemption had been a temporary measure during that war. During King George's War a similar ban on impressment in the West Indies was enacted by the Sugar Trade Act 1745 (19 Geo. 2 c. 30), but with exceptions in the last section it caused further confusion and controversy. As a result, American colonists who resisted impressment often believed that they were within their legal rights to do so. Boston seamen were particularly insistent on this point, for a number of reasons. Many of them had taken part in the Siege of Louisbourg, and in return for their service had been promised by Commodore Peter Warren of the Royal Navy that they would not be impressed. Furthermore, because Boston depended on its seamen to transport food and fuel to the city, Governor William Shirley made a point when issuing impressment warrants of limiting them to non-residents of Massachusetts on inbound vessels. Outbound vessels, fishing vessels, and coasters were strictly off limits.

In November 1745, a press-gang killed two sailors—both veterans of Louisbourg—during a struggle in a Boston boardinghouse. Two of the killers were caught and sentenced to death by hanging, but the verdict was found to be invalid by the Crown and overturned. The incident destroyed whatever goodwill the navy may have had in Boston, and set the stage for a violent uprising. As historian John Noble put it, "the temper of the town was quite ready for such an outbreak." Rear-Admiral of the White Charles Knowles (Note: Several sources refer to Knowles as a commodore. He attained the rank of commodore in 1742 and was promoted to Rear-Admiral of the White in 1747. See Brunsman (2007), p. 333, and Lee (1892), p. 292.), who was active in the Americas during the war, had a habit of disregarding local laws and customs when pressing men into service on his warships. In 1743, he provoked a violent incident in Antigua when he ordered the impressment of the crew of a British privateer, a drastic measure normally reserved for national emergencies.

== Impressment ==
In the fall of 1747, a squadron under Knowles's command was anchored at Nantasket in Boston Harbor, being repaired and restocked in preparation for a trip to the West Indies. Desperately in need of personnel, Knowles flouted tradition when he sent press-gangs to round up sailors in the harbor and along the waterfront without first obtaining a warrant from Shirley. Knowles had been repeatedly warned by Warren to "shew what Lenity you can...to the people of those Colonys" and "to give them no room for complaints." Nevertheless, on the evening of 16 November 1747, and into the next morning, Knowles's press-gangs captured some 46 men, treating them roughly and ignoring their protests that they were Massachusetts residents. Not all were on inbound ships, and some were not even seamen, but carpenters and laborers on their way to work. One outbound ship, Mercury, was left almost completely unattended when 16 of its 19 crewmen were taken, and sustained serious damage as a result.

== Riot ==
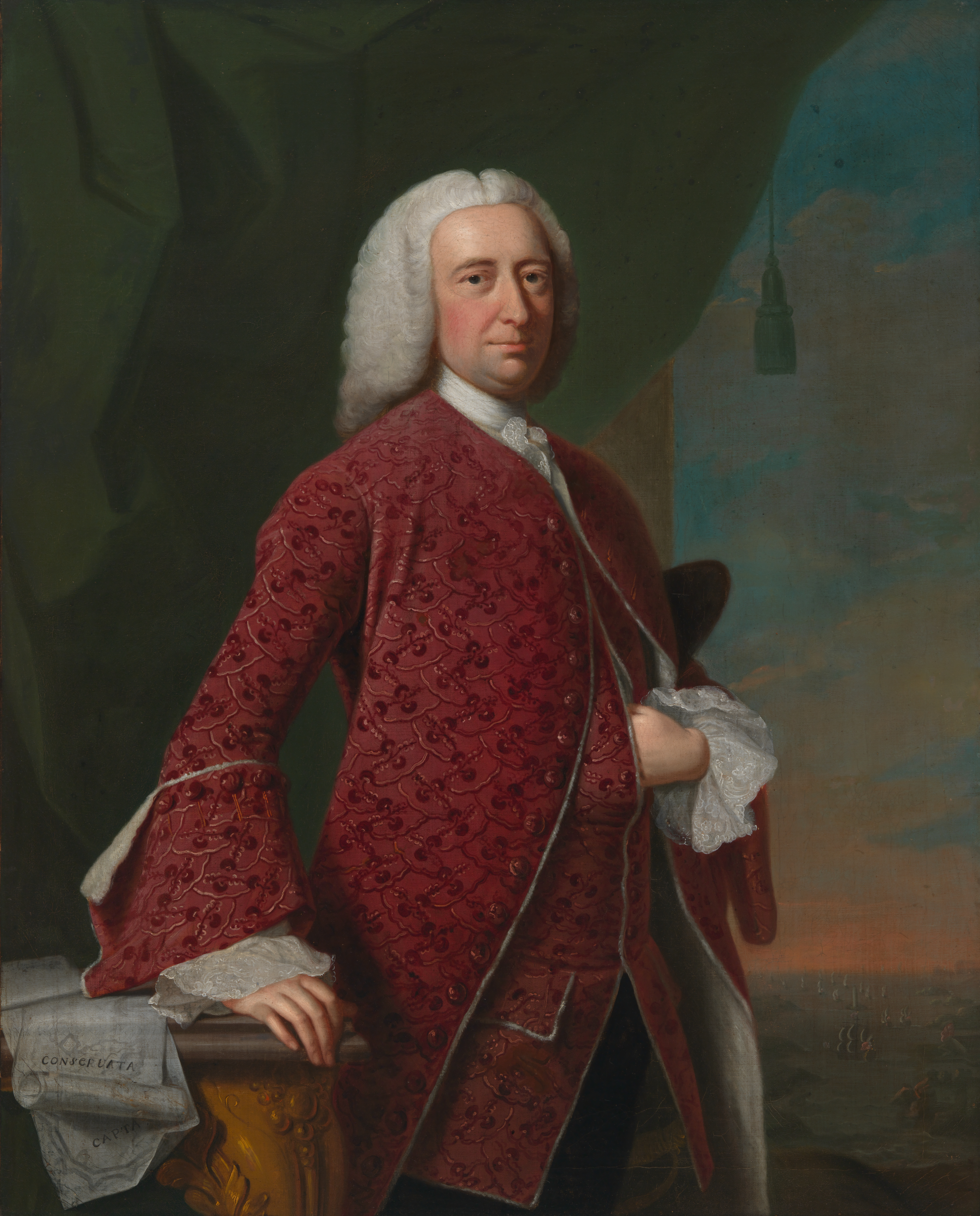
Portrait of William Shirley made three years after the riot

On the morning of 17 November, a mob of about 300 locals, wielding cutlasses and clubs, captured a lieutenant of the Lark in retaliation for what they considered an illegal press. Attempting to free the officers, the sheriff of Suffolk County, Benjamin Pollard, arrested two of the rioters. The sheriff and his deputies often assisted the navy's press-gangs, which did little to endear them to the townspeople. The mob attacked the sheriff, forcing him to release his two prisoners, and taking one of his deputies as a hostage. One witness wrote later that the sheriff "was glad to get off with a Broken Head, tho' he was in danger of losing it." Thomas Hutchinson, then the Speaker of the House and an outspoken critic of impressment, managed to persuade the mob to release the lieutenant, who had not been part of the press-gang, and brought him to the governor's mansion for safekeeping. Upon hearing what had happened, Shirley called for the militia to "suppress the Mob by force, and, if need was, to fire upon 'em with Ball."

No sooner had he given this order than the angry mob appeared at his front door with three more naval officers and Knowles's servant as hostages. Armed with a cutlass, a spokesman for the mob accused Shirley of having issued an illegal impressment warrant. Shirley denied the charge and called the man an "Impudent Rascal"; his son-in-law, William Bollen, knocked the man's hat off. Shirley claimed there were seven or eight armed officers in the house who were "ready to stand upon their Defence, in case the Mob should be so outrageous, as to attempt to break into the House." He then escorted the officers into the house while Hutchinson calmed the crowd and persuaded them not to follow. The rioters still had one hostage: the sheriff's deputy, whom they beat in the governor's courtyard, and put in stocks. After the mob left, the governor headed to the Town House at the corner of King and Cornhill Streets, which was home to the Massachusetts General Court. Upstairs in the Council chamber, he spoke with members about his plans for dispersing the mob and offering rewards for informants.

The House of Representatives, which met on the first floor of the Town House, assembled that day to discuss the incident. House records suggest that they were sympathetic to the rioters, "inasmuch as it hath been represented to this House, that sundry Inhabitants of this Province have been taken from their lawful Employments, and forcibly carried on board his Majesty's Ships of War." As dusk fell, they adjourned. They had probably been informed that the mob was on its way, and left without warning the others so that the townspeople could present their demands directly to the governor and the Council. Only Hutchinson and a few other representatives went upstairs to confer with the governor. Minutes later, an angry mob surrounded the Town House, breaking all the first-floor windows with stones and brickbats and forcing their way in. The exact nature of the crowd has been the subject of some debate. Town officials claimed that "the said Riotous Tumultuous Assembly consisted of Foreign Seamen, Servants, Negros & other Persons of mean & vile condition." Some historians believe this was an effort to deflect blame, while others treat it as fact. Hutchinson estimated the crowd's size at "several thousand," remarkable in a city with a population of just 16,000. In addition to sailors and other maritime workers, the crowd likely included most of Boston's militia, as well as some middle-class shopkeepers and merchants, women, and others whose lives were affected by impressment.

Several militia officers who were assembled on the first floor were forced up a narrow staircase into the Council Chamber, creating a bottleneck which halted the mob's progress and gave the governor a chance to address them. At Hutchinson's urging, Shirley promised he would do his best to obtain the release of the impressed men. The rioters were not satisfied. A spokesman came forward and demanded to know why the men convicted in the press-gang killings of 1745 had not been executed. The governor explained that the execution had been suspended by order of the king. The spokesman then issued a thinly veiled threat, asking Shirley if he remembered the Porteous Riots in Edinburgh, in which Captain John Porteous of the Edinburgh City Guard had been "hang'd upon a sign post." Shirley replied that he remembered it well, and that he "hop'd they remember'd what the Consequence of that proceeding was to the Inhabitants of the City," another not-so-subtle threat of violence. Promising to return the next day, the crowd left the Town House, but continued rioting through the night. In a symbolic gesture, they dragged a barge onto Boston Common and burned it, believing it to be the property of the navy. Afterwards, they split up into groups to find more hostages. Rioters broke into the naval hospital and raided the homes of several residents, taking four or five petty officers hostage. Meanwhile, Shirley helped smuggle some of Knowles's officers out of town and onto a barge that carried them safely back to the fleet.

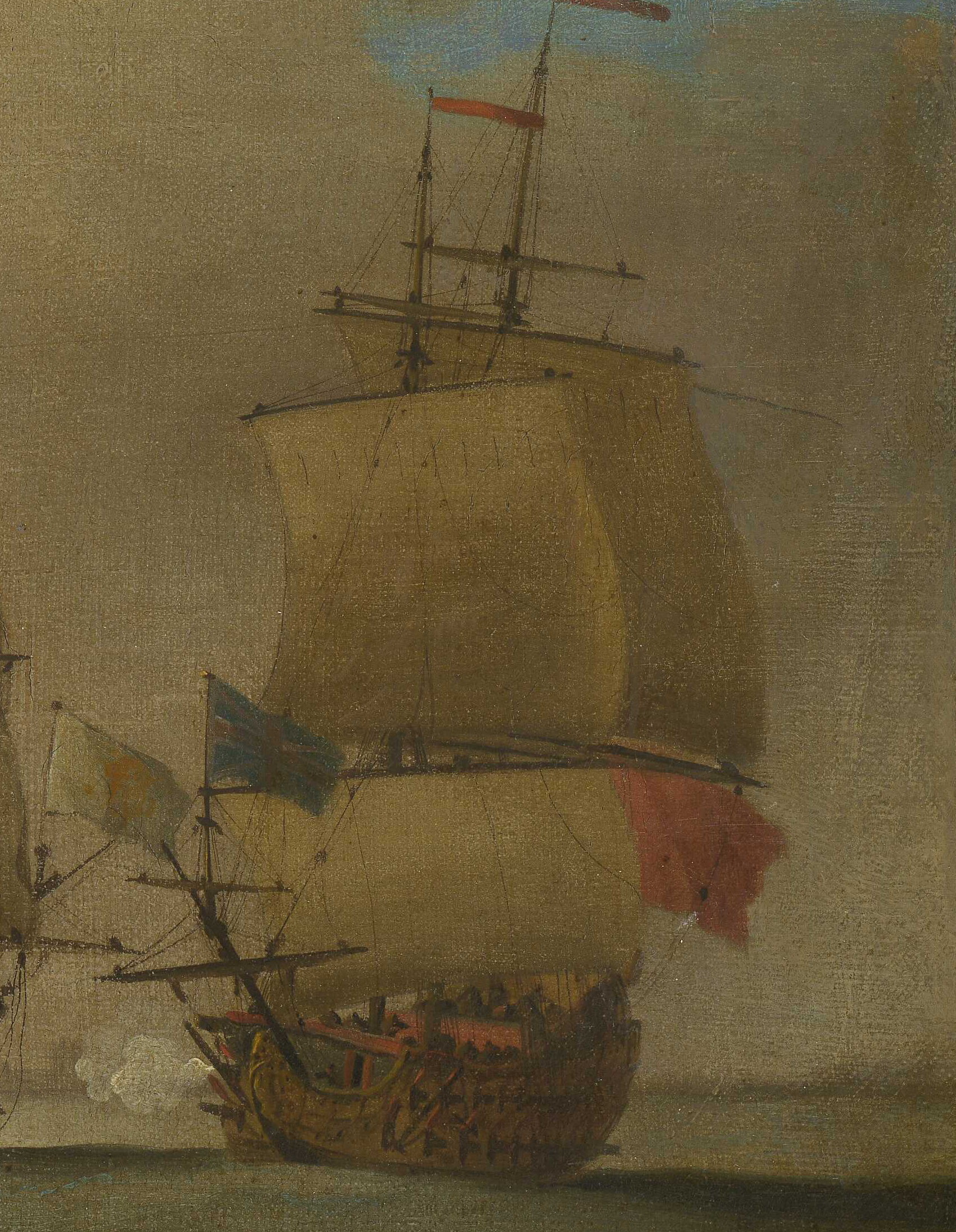
HMS Canterbury, which Knowles was aboard during the riot

Despite the governor's call for two regiments of militia, only 30 officers reported for duty that night. The rest of the two regiments, in all likelihood, had joined the rioting mob. Without the militia to enforce the rule of law, Boston effectively had no functioning government. Suspecting that the insurrection was "secretly countenens'd and encourag'd by some ill-minded Inhabitants, and Persons of Influence in the Town," Governor Shirley fled to Castle William, a fort on Castle Island in Boston Harbor, hoping to enlist the aid of neighboring regiments to quell the disorder. Once there, Shirley was better able to communicate with Knowles, who was aboard the 60-gun HMS Canterbury. In a letter, he informed Knowles of the riot and asked him to release the impressed Bostonians. Instead, Knowles threatened to bring up his warships and bombard Boston. Witnesses on Canterbury later reported that Knowles appeared to have every intention of carrying through on his threat. One sailor heard Knowles tell the ship's gunnery officer to load 24 guns, declaring, "By God I'll now see if the King's Government is not as good as a Mob!" Joseph Ballard, a Boston carpenter who was making repairs on Canterbury, begged Knowles to reconsider:

I replyed Oh! how will that do, Sir the Righteous will suffer with the Wicked. how will you find out the Rebels he Answered the North End people were the Rebels. I told him I should suffer then for I lived there he replyed no, no I'll take care of that I will punish ye guilty I told him he must be very curious in throwing his Shot then...

In an exchange of letters, Shirley managed to talk Knowles out of razing the North End. On the morning of the 19th, he wrote to the General Court to let them know that Knowles was unwilling to release the impressed men as long as his own officers were being held. He added that he would be dining with Knowles later that day, and asked them to persuade the townspeople to stop the riot, promising that it was within his power "to set all things right" with their assistance. That day the General Court adopted a series of resolutions condemning the riot, instructing the militia of its duty to maintain order, ordering the release of the hostages, and urging the governor to promise the townspeople "that all due care shall be taken for maintaining their just rights and Liberties, and for redressing all and every Grievance." By the end of the next day the militia had turned out, the mob had dispersed, the hostages had returned to their ships, and the impressed Massachusetts residents had been freed. (Note: According to at least one other source, Knowles did not release his prisoners until the 21st. See Lax (1976), p. 196.) Knowles and his squadron sailed for the West Indies on 30 November, "to the joy of the rest of the town."

== Aftermath ==
In the course of the riot, eleven men were arrested: five sailors, four laborers, a bookkeeper, and a carpenter. Three of them were fined, and the rest were acquitted. The General Court passed several more resolutions for appearances' sake, condemning the riot and offering a reward for the ringleaders. A few days after the riot, a pamphlet about the incident was published under the pseudonym Amicus Patrie ("a friend of the country"). The author, thought by some historians to have been a young Samuel Adams (a cousin of the future second U.S. President John Adams), used Lockean reasoning to defend the rioters, arguing that they had a natural right to resist impressment: "For when they are suddenly attack'd, without the least Warning, and by they know not whom; I think they are treated as in a State of Nature, and have a natural Right, to treat their Oppressors, as under such Circumstances." This was the first time a natural rights argument was used to justify resistance to the authority of the Crown by American colonists, which was beginning to be perceived as foreign and tyrannical. Thus the Knowles Riot indirectly contributed to political ideas and arguments that were used in the American Revolutionary War, thirty years later.

In December of that year, a physician named William Douglass, known for writing polemical pamphlets, published a history of the American colonies in which he attacked Knowles:

Mr Knowles as a sea Commander perhaps may be noted in the future history of our colony for his unprecedented arrogance by insulting the governments & distressing of trade. He is of obscure parentage, in his youth served aboard the navy in the meanest stations, & from some unaccountable whim or humour of some of the officers (thus some ladies take a liking or fancy to a monkey, lapdog or parrot)...he is arrived to be a warrant Commodore in America, where like a beggar on horseback he rides unmercifully...hated by the common sailors, & not beloved by his best officers; laboriously indefatigable in running to & fro, & in expending of paper, true symptoms of madness.

Knowles sued Douglass for libel and was awarded £750. When Douglass appealed, Knowles contended that the only problem with the original judgment was that it should have been for £10,000, and therefore he was suing Douglass again, this time for £9,250. The superior court ruled in favor of Douglass. The incident seems to have made a lasting impression on Knowles. The following year in Jamaica he was much more cautious, advertising for recruits, offering financial incentives, and consulting with local authorities before resorting to impressment. In 1758, an anonymous pamphlet attributed to Knowles proposed a plan to solve the navy's recruiting problem by building hundreds of free houses for navy men and their families in Massachusetts. If implemented, the plan would have dramatically reduced the navy's dependence on impressment.

== See also ==
- War of Jenkins' Ear
- King George's War
