= William Newland (MP) =

British lawyer and Tory politician

William Newland (c. 1685–1738), of Gatton, Surrey and St James's Park, Westminster, was a British lawyer and Tory politician who sat in the House of Commons from 1710 to 1738.

Newland was baptized on 9 March 1685, the third but eldest surviving son of Sir George Newland, a wealthy scrivener of London, and his wife Rebecca Turgis, daughter of Edward Turgis, Draper, of London. In 1703, he inherited the manor of Gatton, which had control of one of the Parliamentary seats at Gatton, from Thomas Turgis, MP to whom he was distantly related. He matriculated at St John's College, Oxford on 13 May 1703, aged 17 and was also admitted at Inner Temple in 1703. He married Martha Shepeard (died 1724), daughter of Edmund Shephard, Painter-Stainer, of Fleet Street, London on 25 July 1710. In 1711, he was called to the bar.

Newland was an ardent Tory, and in 1710 provided Dr Sacheverell with a glass carriage so the crowds could see him when he was called to Parliament, and was said to have thrown money at the crowd to incite them to cheer. At the first opportunity after coming of age, Newlands was returned as Tory Member of Parliament for Gatton at the 1710 general election. He was considered a 'worthy patriot' for helping to discover the mismanagements of the previous ministry and a 'Tory patriot' for opposing the continuation of the war. At the 1713 general election he was returned unopposed at Gatton and gave his attention the return of his father as MP for the City of London. However his father committed suicide on 26 March 1714, probably in a temporary fit of insanity. Newland remained active in Parliament.

Newland was returned unopposed at the 1715 general election. With the change of administration, he was one of the Tories who were dismissed from the Surrey commission of the peace in 1716. He voted against the Government in all recorded divisions in that Parliament and subsequent parliaments after he was returned in 1722, 1727 and 1734.

Newland died on 4 May 1738, leaving three daughters. His brother George succeeded to his Parliamentary seat at Gatton.

Parliament of Great Britain
Preceded by Sir George Newland; Paul Docminique	Member of Parliament for Gatton; 1710–1738; With: Paul Docminique 1710-1735; Charles Docminique1735-1738	Succeeded by Professor George Newland; Charles Docminique
