= George Newland =

British academic

George Newland (c. 1692–1749), of Gatton, Surrey, was a British academic and Tory politician who sat in the House of Commons from 1738 to 1749. He was Gresham Professor of Geometry from 1731 to 1749.

Newland was the fourth son of Sir George Newland MP, of Smithfield, London, and his wife Rebecca Turgis, daughter of Edward Turgis, merchant of London. He matriculated at St John's College, Oxford on 26 July 1709, aged 17. He was a demy of Magdalen College, Oxford, from 1711 to 1720, and a fellow there from 1720 to 1738. In 1726 he was appointed senior proctor of the University of Oxford, and was thus responsible for enforcing university discipline and sanctions. In February 1727 when he was 35 years old, he was appointed university reader in moral philosophy, and was awarded DCL in 1729. In 1731 Newland resigned his post as reader and became professor of geometry at Gresham College, holding the post for the rest of his life. He was also a governor of St Bartholomew's Hospital and the Bridewell and Bethlehem Hospitals He succeeded to the estates of his brother William in 1738.

Newland was returned unopposed as Member of Parliament for Gatton in succession to his brother at a by-election on 16 May 1738. He voted consistently with the Opposition. He was returned again unopposed at the 1741 British general election and then at the 1747 British general election, He was described as 'a strong Jacobite'.

Newland died intestate on 22 October 1749. His heirs obtained a private Act in 1751, which allowed them to sell the manor of Gatton to Sir James Colebrooke for £23,000.

Parliament of Great Britain
Preceded by William Newland; Charles Docminique	Member of Parliament for Gatton; 1738–1749; With: Charles Docminique 1738-1745; Paul Humphrey 1745-1749	Succeeded by Charles Knowles; Paul Humphrey
