= Charles Docminique =

British politician (c. 1686 – 1745)

Charles Docminique (c. 1686 – 1745), of Chipstead, Surrey, was a British politician who sat in the House of Commons from 1735 to 1745.

Docminique was the eldest surviving son of Paul Docminique, of Chipstead Surrey and his wife Margaret Edwards, daughter of Rev. Robert Edwards of Kibworth, Leicestershire. He matriculated at St John's College, Oxford on 21 November 1704, aged 18. He succeeded his father in 1735.

Docminique was returned unopposed as Member of Parliament for Gatton in succession to his father at a by-election on 5 April 1735. He was returned unopposed again at the 1741 British general election His only recorded vote was in December 1741 with the Administration on the election of a chairman of the elections committee.

Docminique died unmarried on 16 June 1745. His estates passed to his first cousin, Paul Humphrey.

Parliament of Great Britain
Preceded by William Newland; Paul Docminique	Member of Parliament for Gatton; 1735–1745; With: William Newland 1735-1738; Professor George Newland 1738-1745	Succeeded by Professor George Newland; Paul Humphrey
