= Baron Haversham =

Extinct barony in the Peerage of England

1st Baron Haversham of South Hill Park

Baron Haversham is a title that has been created twice, once in the Peerage of England and once in the Peerage of the United Kingdom. Both creations are extinct. The first creation came on 4 May 1696, when Sir John Thompson, 1st Baronet was created Baron Haversham, of Haversham in the County of Buckingham, in the Peerage of England. He had formerly been member of parliament for Gatton and had already been created a Baronet, of Haversham in the County of Buckingham, in the Baronetage of England in 1673. His son, the second Baron, sat as Member of Parliament for Bletchingley and Gatton, before inheriting the title. He had no sons and the barony became extinct on his death on 11 April 1745.

The second creation came on 11 January 1906, when the Liberal politician Sir Arthur Hayter, 2nd Baronet, was created Baron Haversham, of Bracknell in the County of Berkshire, in the Peerage of the United Kingdom. He was the only son of the Whig politician William Goodenough Hayter, best remembered for his two tenures as Parliamentary Secretary to the Treasury in the 1850s, who was created a Baronet, of South Hill Park in the County of Berkshire, on 19 April 1858. Lord Haversham was childless and both the barony and baronetcy became extinct on his death on 10 May 1917.

== Barons Haversham; First creation (1696) ==
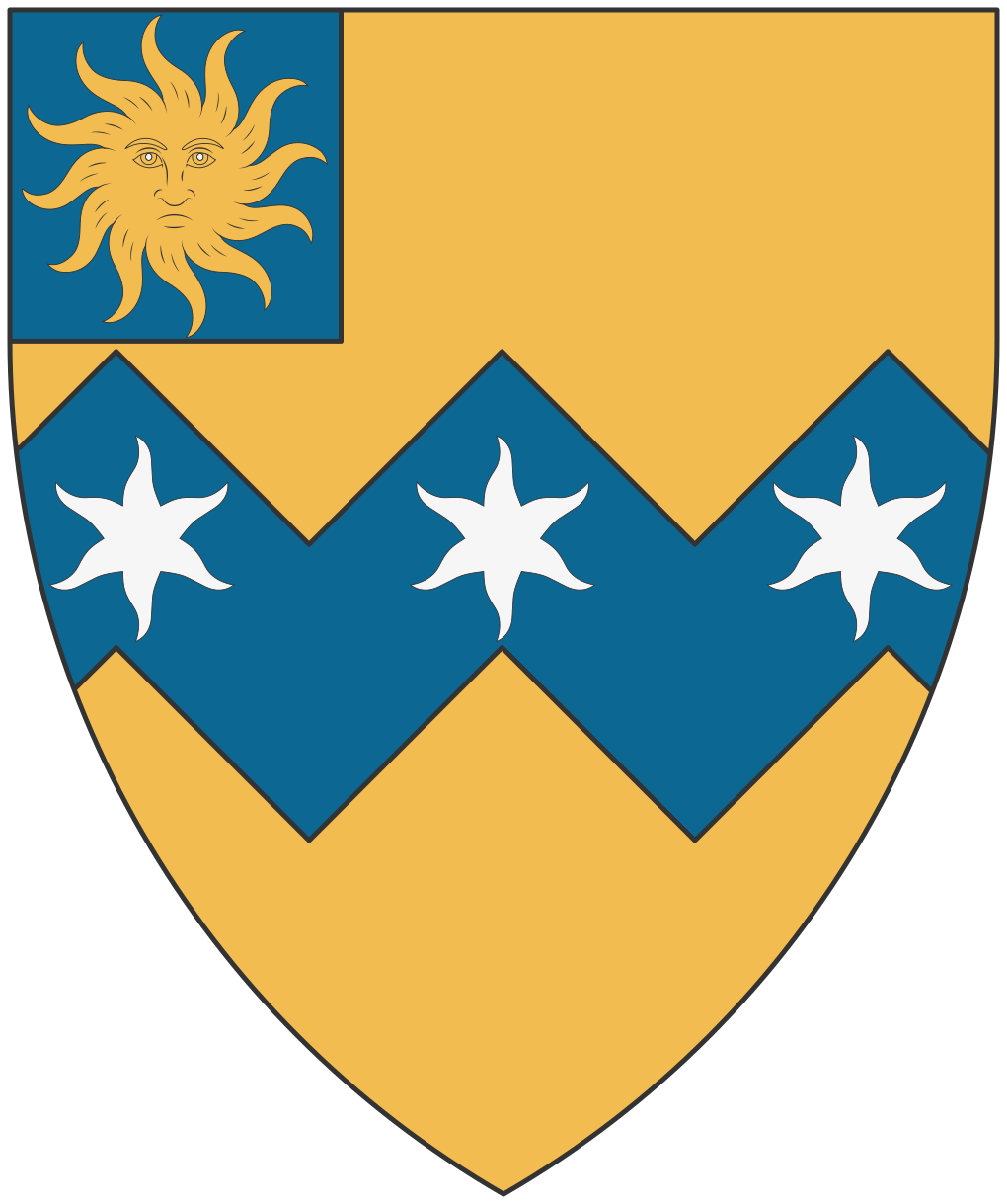
Arms of Thompson, Baron Haversham

- John Thompson, 1st Baron Haversham (1648–1710)
- Maurice Thompson, 2nd Baron Haversham (1675–1745)

== Hayter Baronets, of South Hill Park (1858) ==
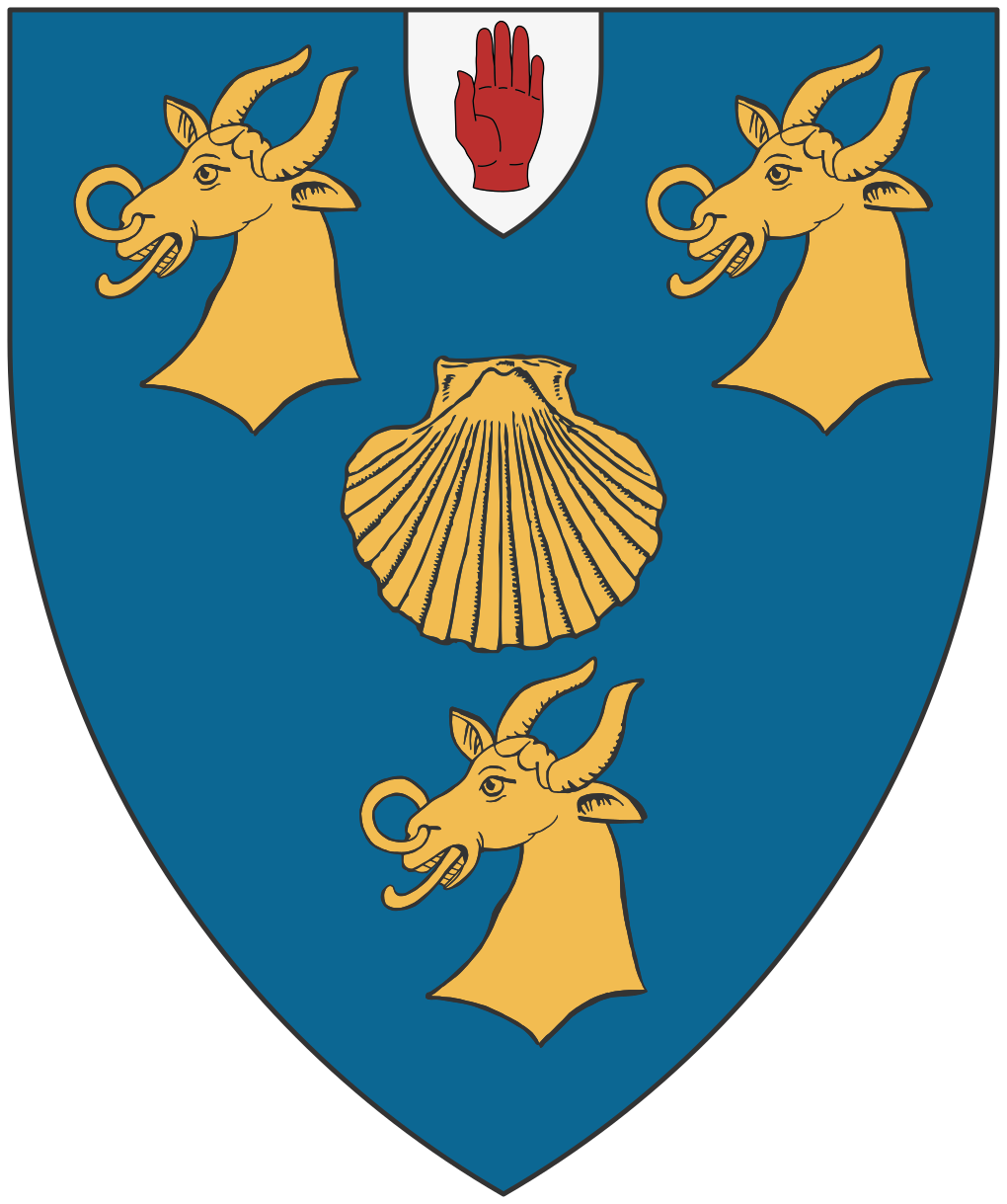
Arms of Hayter of South Hill

- Sir William Goodenough Hayter, 1st Baronet (1792–1878)
- Sir Arthur Divett Hayter, 2nd Baronet (1835–1917) (created Baron Haversham in 1906)

== Barons Haversham; Second creation (1906) ==
- Arthur Divett Hayter, 1st Baron Haversham (1835–1917)
