= HMS Peregrine Galley =

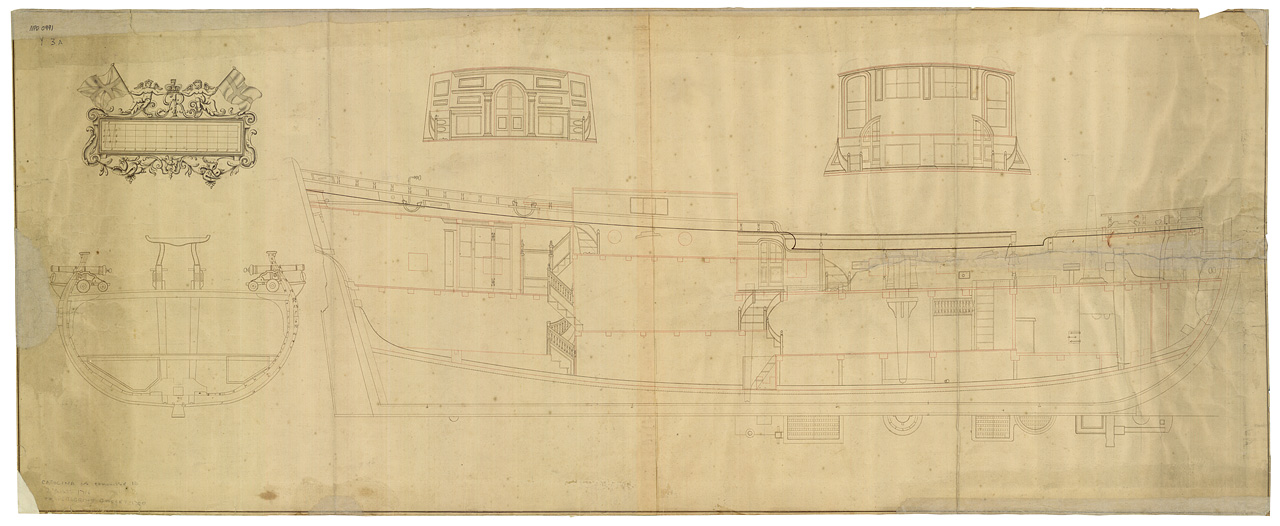
- The yacht as she was in 1716 when renamed Carolina

History

Great Britain
- Name: HMS Peregrine Galley
- Ordered: 10 June 1699
- Builder: William Lee, Sheerness Dockyard
- Launched: 21 September 1700
- Commissioned: February 1701
- Renamed: Carolina on 29 May 1716
- Fate: Foundered in the Channel about 28 December 1761

General characteristics from 1700 to 1733
- Class & type: 20-gun sixth-rate
- Tons burthen: 196 84/94 bm
- Length: 86 ft 10 in (26.5 m) (gundeck); 71 ft 0 in (21.6 m) (keel)
- Beam: 22 ft 10 in (7.0 m)
- Depth of hold: 10 ft 7 in (3.2 m)
- Propulsion: Sail
- Sail plan: ship-rigged
- Complement: 50
- Armament: Upper deck: 16 × 3-pdrs; Quarterdeck: 4 × 3-pdrs

General characteristics from 1733 to 1761 (following rebuild)
- Tons burthen: 216 bm
- Length: 86 ft 6 in (26.4 m) (gundeck); 70 ft 6 in (21.5 m) (keel)
- Beam: 24 ft 0 in (7.3 m)
- Depth of hold: 15 ft 6 in (4.7 m)
- Propulsion: Sail
- Sail plan: ship-rigged
- Complement: 70
- Notes: Royal yacht until 1739

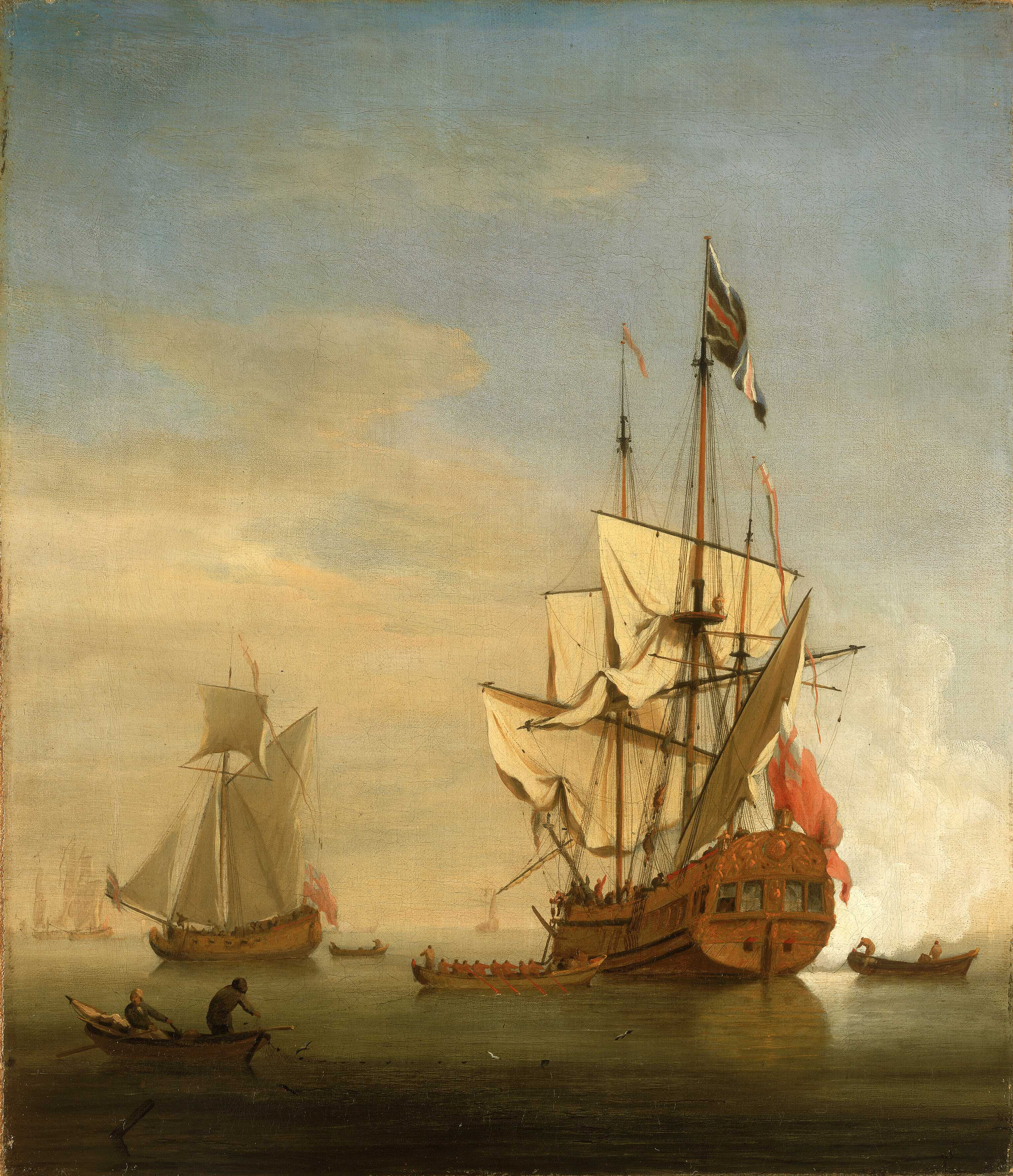
It has been suggested that the main vessel here is Peregrine Galley in 1706 painted by Willem van de Velde the Younger

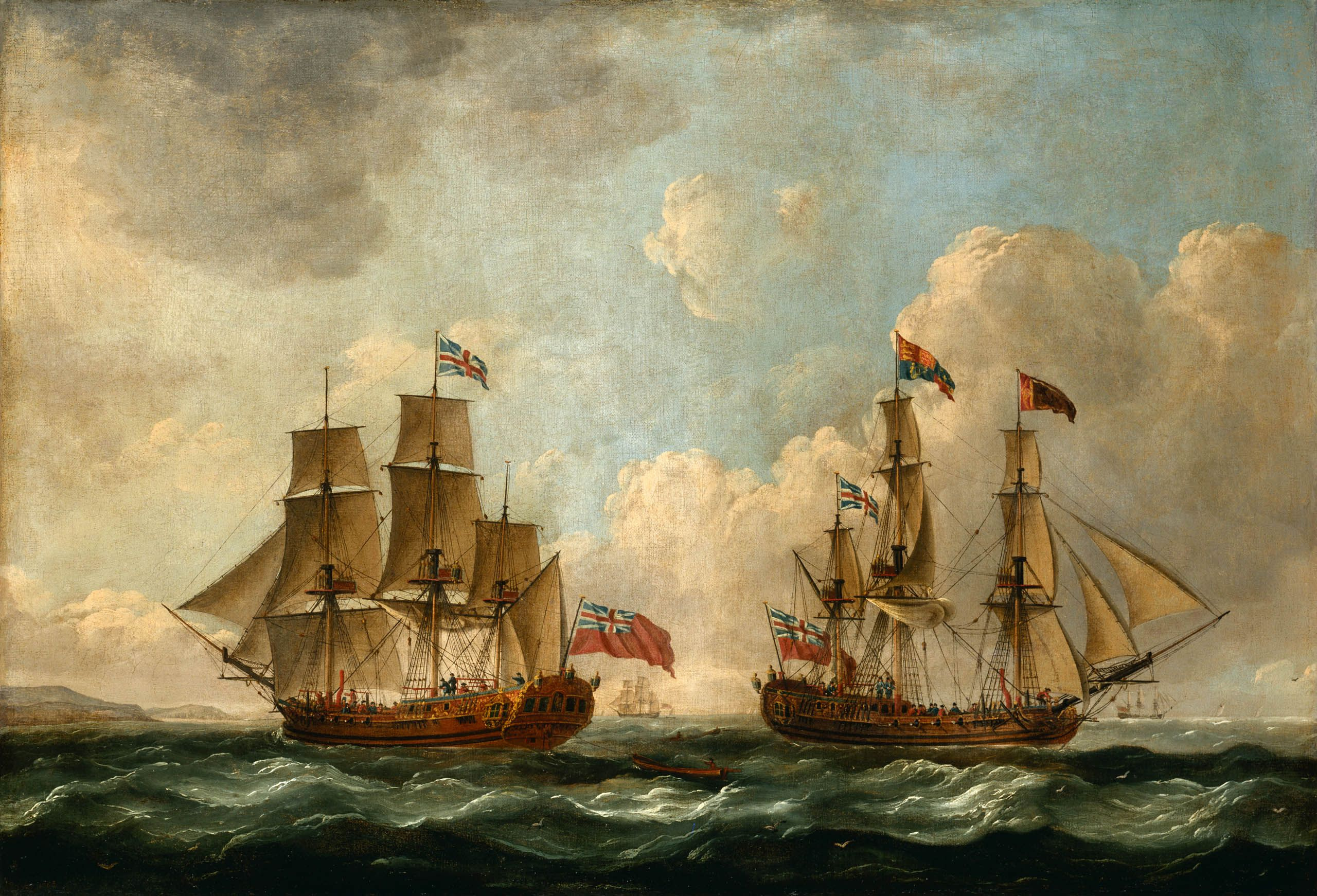
The Peregrine (also known as the Royal Caroline) in Two Positions off the Coast, painted in 1766 by John Cleveley the Elder

HMS Peregrine Galley was a 20-gun sixth-rate ship of the Royal Navy, built in 1699-1700 at Sheerness Dockyard by Master Shipwright William Lee to a design by Rear-Admiral the Marquis of Carmarthen. She was generally employed as a Royal yacht and in 1716 she was officially renamed HMS Carolina and converted to a permanent Royal yacht. In May 1733 she was rebuilt by Richard Storey at Deptford Dockyard as the Royal yacht and again renamed, this time as Royal Caroline. In 1739 she ceased to be the Royal yacht and resumed her classification as a Sixth Rate. In 1749 a new Royal Caroline was built to replace her. She reverted to being a naval sloop under the name HMS Peregrine and served until her loss on or about 28 December 1761.

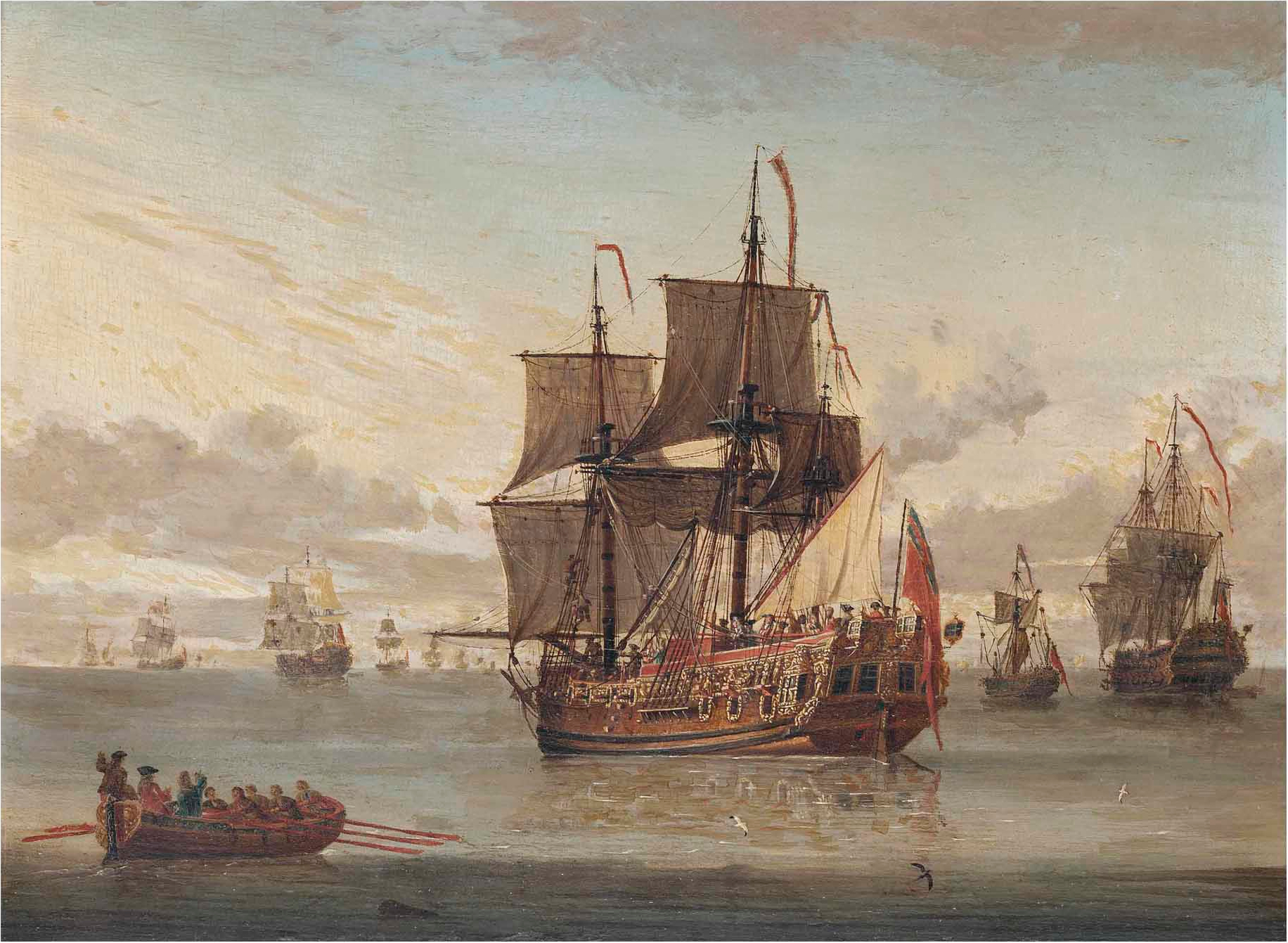
The Royal Yacht Carolina, by L De Man

== Naval career ==
She was initially commissioned in February 1701 under the command of her designer, Rear-Admiral the Marquis of Carmarthen. In 1702 she was placed under the command of Lieutenant William Sanderson who remained in command until 1714 (he was promoted to captain in January 1713). She conveyed the new King of the United Kingdom, the Hanoverian George I from Germany to England in August 1714.

Following her decommissioning, she was then converted into a permanent Royal yacht and renamed HMS Carolina by Order of 29 May 1716. She was recommissioned in her new role under Captain Galfridus Walpole from 1716 to 1720, and subsequently served under the command of Captain John Guy from 1721 to 1729, and then Captain Charles Hardy from 1730 to 1732.

She was then rebuilt as the Royal yacht Royal Caroline; recommissioned in 1733 under Sir Charles Hardy again (until 1741), she was subsequently commanded as a Sixth Rate by Captain Charley Molloy (until decommissioned in 1749). She served finally as the sloop Peregrine until December 1761 when, while under Lieutenant & Commander Edward Knowles, she foundered with all hands in the English Channel on or soon after 28 December.

== Bibliography ==
- Winfield, Rif (2009). British Warships of the Age of Sail 1603–1714: Design, Construction, Careers and Fates. Seaforth. ISBN 9781848320406.
- Winfield, Rif (2007). British Warships of the Age of Sail 1714–1792: Design, Construction, Careers and Fates. Seaforth. ISBN 9781844157006.
