= HMS Success (1712) =

History

Great Britain
- Name: HMS Success
- Ordered: 9 October 1711
- Builder: Royal Dockyard, Portsmouth
- Launched: 30 April 1712
- Completed: 3 July 1712
- Commissioned: 1715
- Fate: Sold at Plymouth 22 July 1743

General characteristics
- Type: 24-gun Sixth Rate
- Tons burthen: 274 89/94 bm
- Length: 94 ft 6 in (28.8 m) gundeck; 73 ft 4.5 in (22.4 m) keel for tonnage
- Beam: 26 ft 6.5 in (8.1 m) for tonnage
- Depth of hold: 11 ft 10 in (3.6 m)
- Sail plan: ship-rigged
- Armament: 20 × 6-pdr 19 cwt guns on wooden trucks (UD); 4 × 4-pdr 12 cwt guns on wooden trucks (QD)

HMS Success was a member of the Gibraltar Group of 24-gun sixth rates. After commissioning she spent her career in Home waters, the West Indies and the North America on trade protection duties. She was sold in 1743.

Success was the sixth named vessel since it was used for a 34-gun ship captured from the French (Jules) on 19 October 1650 and sold in 1662 (known as Old Success from 1660).

== Construction ==
She was ordered on 9 October 1711 from Portsmouth Dockyard to be built under the guidance of Richard Stacey, Master Shipwright of Portsmouth. She was launched on 30 April 1712. She was completed for sea on 3 July 1712 at an initial cost of £2,093.16.13/4d (Note: A total cost accounting for inflation of approximately £373,600 in today's money.) to build.

== Commissioned service ==
She was commissioned in 1712 under the command of Commander John Briscoe, RN (promoted to captain in January 1713) for service in Virginia. With the death of Captain Briscoe in early 1714, Captain Samuel Meads, RN took command in January 1714. She returned to Home Waters to undergo a small repair at Deptford between September and December 1716 costing £1,302.8.91/2d. (Note: A total cost accounting for inflation of approximately £231,400 in today's money.) In 1716 Capt George Clinton, RN followed by Captain Isaac Townsend, RN in February 1720 were in command both serving in Ireland. She was refitted at Portsmouth for £1,866.9.61/2d (Note: A total cost accounting for inflation of approximately £354,400 in today's money.) during January/March 1724. She underwent a great repair at Portsmouth during October 1727 thru July 1728 at a cost of £4,640.3.0d. (Note: A total cost accounting for inflation of approximately £818,000 in today's money.) She was recommissioned in June 1728 with Captain William Smith, RN in command for service in the West Indies. February 1729 saw Captain Richard Symonds, RN in command followed by Captain Thomas Smith, RN in May 1730 for service in the English Channel. She was paid off in April 1732.

She was recommissioned under Captain Ellis Brand, for service in the North Sea followed by Captain John Towry, RN for service in the English Channel in November 1732. She paid off in November 1733. She underwent a small repair at Portsmouth in June 1735 costing £200.16.0d. (Note: A total cost accounting for inflation of approximately £37,500 in today's money.) Under Admiralty Order (AO) June 1739 she was converted to a fireship of 8 guns, six swivels and 55 men at Portsmouth at a cost of £2,552.14.0d (Note: A total cost accounting for inflation of approximately £493,100 in today's money.) during June to September 1739. Upon completion she was recommissioned under Commander James Peers, RN and joined Vernon's squadron in January 1740. Commander Daniel Hore, RN (promoted to captain in April 1741) took command in February and participated in the attack on Charges on 23 March 1741 followed by Cartagena Operations in March through April 1741. By February 1742 she was under the command of Commander Thomas Hanway, RN for service in the Channel Islands.

== Disposition ==
HMS Success was sold at Plymouth for £450 (Note: A total cost accounting for inflation of approximately £93,600 in today's money.) on 22 July 1743.
