= Edward Knowles (Royal Navy officer) =

Royal Navy officer (1744–1761)

Captain Edward Knowles
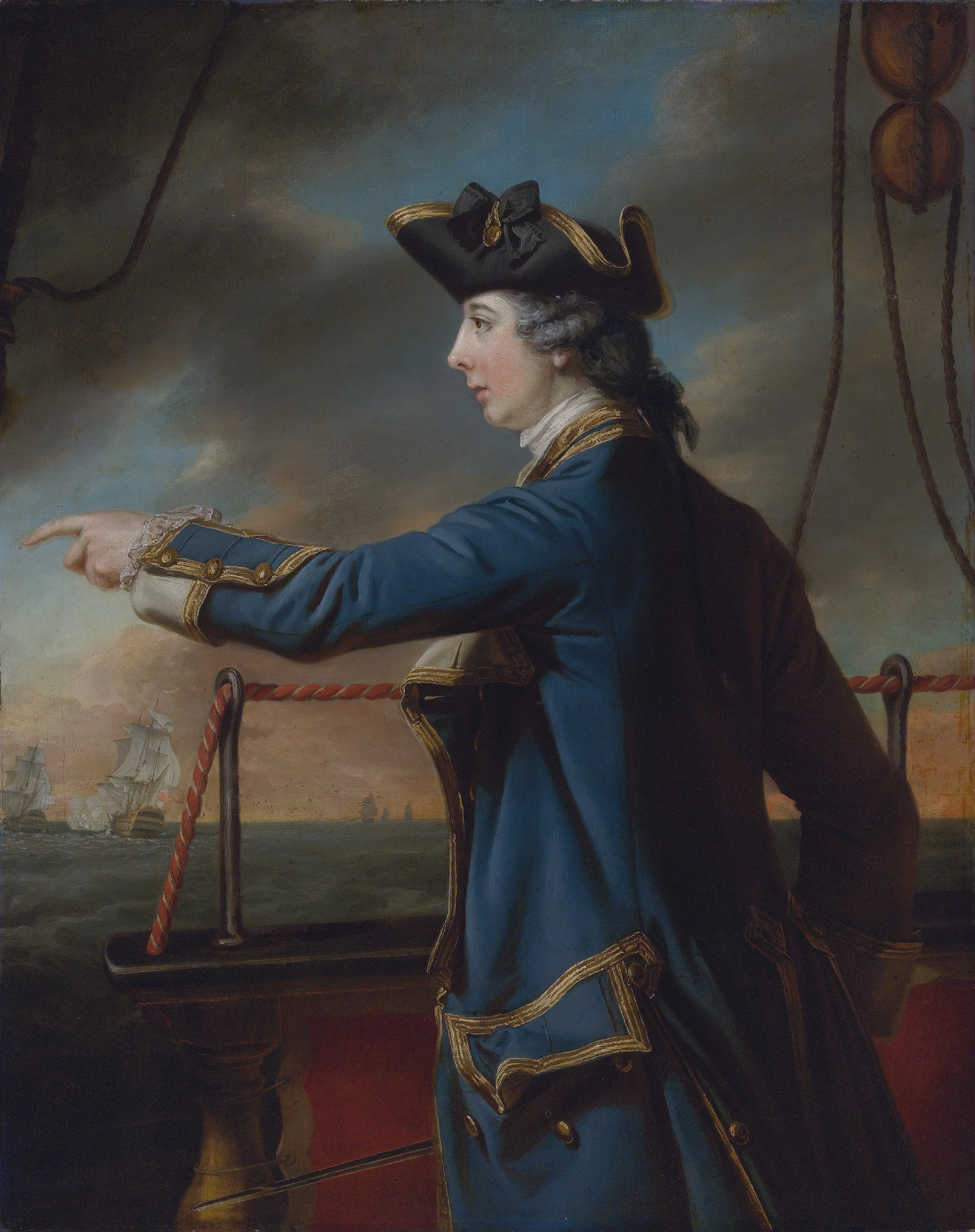
- Portrait by Francis Cotes, 1762
- Born: 1744
- Died: c. 28 December 1761; At sea in the English Channel aboard HMS Peregrine
- Relatives: Sir Charles Knowles, 1st Baronet (father)
- Military career
- Allegiance: Great Britain
- Branch: Royal Navy
- Service years: – 1761
- Rank: Captain
- Commands: HMS Peregrine
- Conflicts: Seven Years' War; Siege of Louisbourg; Battle of the Plains of Abraham

Captain Edward Knowles (1744 – c. 28 December 1761) was a Royal Navy officer who served in the Seven Years' War.

Knowles was born into a distinguished naval family, with his father rising to the rank of admiral and receiving a baronetcy for his services. Edward followed him into the navy, and served with several important officers in operations during the Seven Years' War, which he spent mostly in North American waters. He supported the sieges of Louisbourg and Quebec and made the acquaintance of the natural philosopher John Robison, who spent some time as his mathematics tutor.

Knowles was eventually promoted to command his own ship, an elderly and much reworked vessel, which already had a reputation for being difficult to steer. He set off in poor weather to deliver important despatches to the British commands in the Bay of Biscay but never returned. His ship was presumed to have foundered at sea with the loss of all hands.

== Family and early life ==
Edward Knowles was born in 1744, the only son from the marriage of Captain Charles Knowles and Mary Alleyne, the sister of John Alleyne.^{[a]} His father became a noted naval officer, rising to the rank of admiral and receiving a baronetcy for his services to his country. Edward attended Eton College and then followed his father into the navy. He first served with a colleague of his father, Captain Richard Howe, of HMS Magnanime. He afterwards went out with Admiral Sir Charles Saunders to the Siege of Louisbourg in February 1759, aboard the 90-gun HMS Neptune. Accompanying him as his personal mathematics tutor was John Robison, who spent the next few years with Edward, and would later serve with his father as a personal secretary. At Louisbourg Knowles took part in the assault on the 64-gun French ship Prudent, anchored in the harbour, and was later promoted to lieutenant during the voyage and operations to capture Quebec. He transferred to the 100-gun HMS Royal William to serve his commission.

== Command ==
After his extended service in North America, Knowles was promoted to commander and appointed to the sloop HMS Peregrine in 1761. Peregrine was the former royal yacht Royal Caroline, which had been fitted with a poop deck, which consequently made it difficult to wear ship.^{[b]} Knowle's tutor Robison had initially hoped to be made purser of the ship, but found her small size less congenial than the larger men of war he had served on, and left after seeing some service in the Bay of Biscay and Lisbon.^{[c]} After some time in command of HMS Peregrine, Knowles was promoted and a commission made out for him as post captain by the Admiralty. It never reached him.

== Final voyage ==
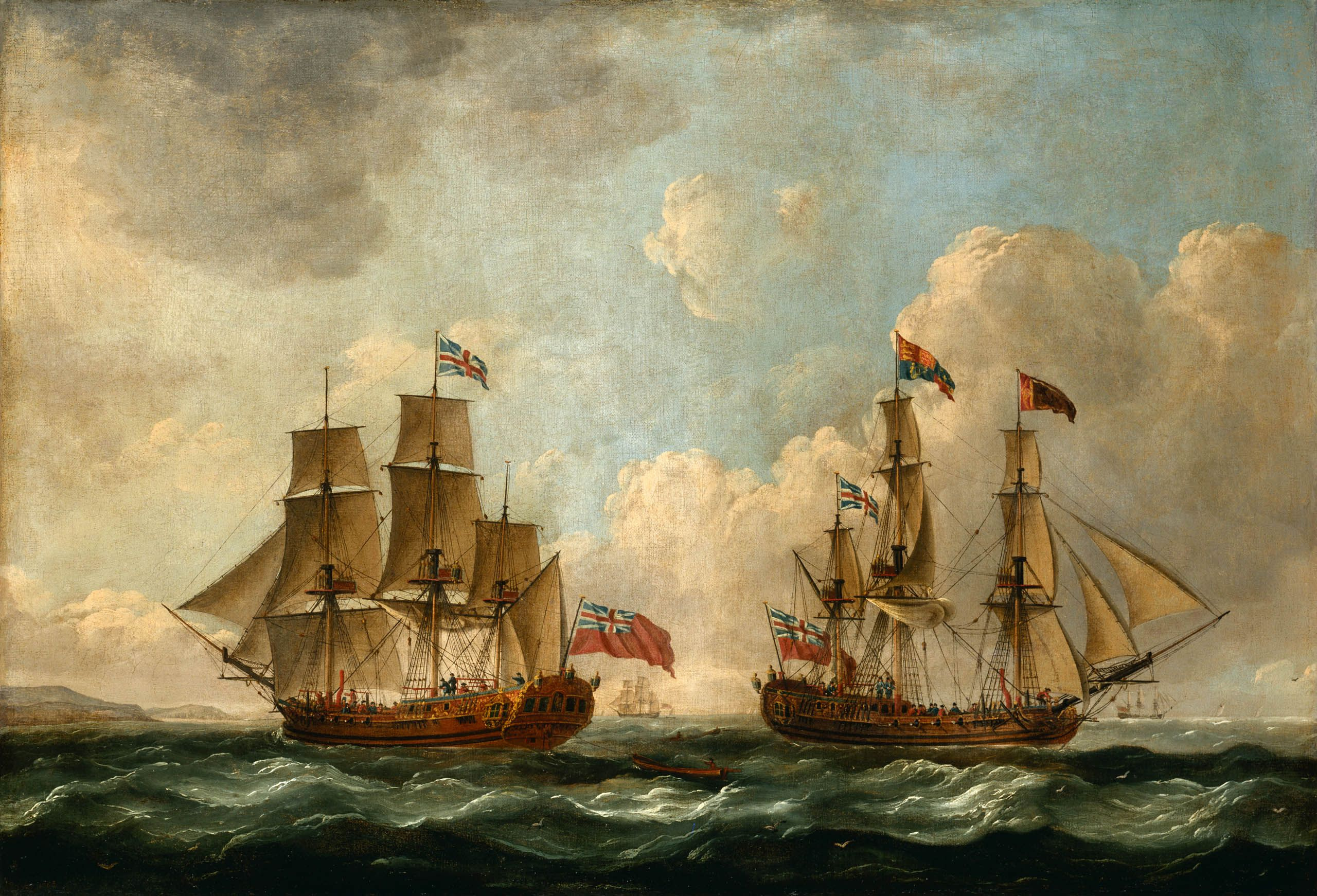
The Peregrine (later renamed the Royal Caroline) in Two Positions off the Coast, 1766 by John Cleveley the Elder

The imminent declaration of war with Spain necessitated the sending of despatches to the British commands at Belle Isle and Lisbon, and Knowles was entrusted with the task. He rendezvoused with the fleet under Commodore Augustus Keppel off Belle Isle and passed on the news. Keppel attempted to persuade Knowles not to put to sea again owing to the stormy weather, but Knowles convinced Keppel to allow him to continue on. Keppel relented, and Peregrine put to sea. She was never seen again. It was assumed that she had foundered with the loss of all hands on or sometime after 28 December 1761.

== Legacy ==
Knowles predeceased his father; the baronetcy was therefore inherited by Sir Charles Knowles's second son, Charles, Edward's half brother. A posthumous portrait of Edward was commissioned from Francis Cotes, based on a silhouette and a description from his father.

== Notes ==
a. The birth date of 1744 may be an error. The entry for Edward's father in the Oxford Dictionary of National Biography records that Mary Alleyne died in 1742.

b. Peregrine was an elderly ship by this time. She had been launched in 1700 as Peregrine Galley, a 20-gun sixth rate but renamed Carolina in 1716 and converted into a royal yacht. She had been rebuilt and renamed Royal Caroline in 1733, reclassified as a sixth rate in 1739, and finally converted to a sloop and renamed Peregrine.

c. This proved to be a fortuitous decision for Robison, who went on to become a respected natural philosopher and inventor, and a Fellow of the Royal Society of Edinburgh.
