= Thomas Turgis =

English politician

Thomas Turgis (baptised 7 October 1623 – 11 June 1704) was an English politician who sat in the House of Commons between 1659 and 1704, eventually in 1701 becoming the Father of the House, as the member with the longest unbroken service.

Turgis was the eldest surviving son of Thomas Turgis, grocer of London and his first wife Ebbot Urry, daughter of Thomas Urry of Gatcombe, Isle of Wight. He was baptised on 7 October 1623. In 1648 he was made freeman of the Worshipful Company of Grocers and was assistant to the Company to 1687. He succeeded to the property of his wealthy father in 1651 and purchased Lower Gatton in Surrey in 1654. He acquired a number of other manors in Surrey, and was considered one of the wealthiest commoners in England.

In 1659, Turgis was elected Member of Parliament for Gatton in the Third Protectorate Parliament. He was commissioner for militia for Surrey in March 1660. In April 1660, Turgis was re-elected MP for Gatton, when he was opposed for the only time in his career. He was commissioner for sewers in August 1660 and commissioner for assessment for Surrey from August 1660 to 1680. He became an alderman for Farringdon Without ward in the City of London from 1 to 23 July 1661. In 1661 he was re-elected MP for Gatton in the Cavalier Parliament. He was commissioner for recusants for Surrey in 1675 and commissioner for rebuilding of Southwark in 1677. He was returned for Gatton in both elections in 1679 and in 1681 and 1685. In 1687 he was removed as assistant of the Grocers’ Company. He was commissioner for assessment for London and Surrey from 1689 to 1690, He was re-elected MP for Gatton in 1689, 1690, 1695, 1698 and both elections in 1701.

Turgis died at the age of 80 and was buried at St. Dionis Backchurch, leaving ‘an estate of above £100,000’. Gatton was inherited by William Newland, who was elected for Gatton at the age of 21 and sat for the rest of his life.

Turgis married Mary Beake, daughter of William Beake, Merchant Taylor of London by 1655. They had three sons and a daughter.

Parliament of England
Preceded by Not represented in Second Protectorate Parliament	Member of Parliament for Gatton; 1659; With: Edward Bishe	Succeeded by Not represented in Restored Rump
Preceded by Sir John Fagg, 1st Baronet	Father of the House; 1701–1704	Succeeded by Sir Christopher Musgrave, 4th Baronet
