= Sir George Newland =

Sir George Newland (c. 1646-1714), of Smithfield, London and Salisbury Court, Fleet Street, London, was an English Member of Parliament.

Active on the Court of Common Council, Newland was knighted on 3 June 1706. He was a Member (MP) for Gatton from 1705 to 1710 and for the City of London from 1710 to his suicide on 26 March 1714. His sons William and George were also MPs for Gatton.
