= Streynsham Master (Royal Navy officer) =

English naval captain (1682–1724)

Streynsham Master (1682–1724) was an English captain in the Royal Navy.

== Life ==
He was the only son of James Master of East Langdon in Kent, by Joyce, only daughter of Christopher Turnor, baron of the exchequer; James Master's grandfather, Sir Edward Master (died 1648), had married Audry, eldest daughter and coheiress of Robert Streynsham, by whom he had fifteen children. His uncle (younger brother of his father, James), an influential figure in the East India Company, was also named Streynsham Master.

Master entered the navy under Captain George Byng, who had married his sister, Margaret. He was serving with him as a midshipman of HMS Ranelagh in 1704, was promoted to be a lieutenant of the Ranelagh, and was severely wounded in the leg by the explosion at the capture of Gibraltar. On 5 July 1709 he was promoted by Byng, then commander-in-chief in the Mediterranean, to command HMS Fame, and on 22 March 1710 he was posted by Sir John Norris to HMS Ludlow Castle.

In 1712 Master was captain of HMS Ormonde in the Mediterranean; in 1716 and 1717 of the same vessel, now called HMS Dragon, in the Baltic Sea, with Norris and Byng. In March 1718 he was appointed to HMS Superbe, one of the fleet which went out to the Mediterranean with Byng. In the Battle of Cape Passaro off the southern tip of Sicily, 31 July 1718, Master made himself prominent. The Superbe and HMS Kent together engaged the Real San Felipe, the Spanish flagship, till, having beaten her to a standstill, she was boarded and taken by a party from the Superbe, led by Thomas Arnold, her first lieutenant.

After his return to England Master had no further service, dying of a fever, 22 June 1724. He had married, only four months before, Elizabeth, only daughter and heiress of Richard, son of Sir Henry Oxenden, 1st Baronet, but left no issue.

== Notes ==
Attribution

This article incorporates text from a publication now in the public domain: Lee, Sidney, ed. (1894). "Master, Streynsham". Dictionary of National Biography. Vol. 37. London: Smith, Elder & Co.
