= Edward Vernon =

Royal Navy officer (1684–1757)

Admiral Edward Vernon
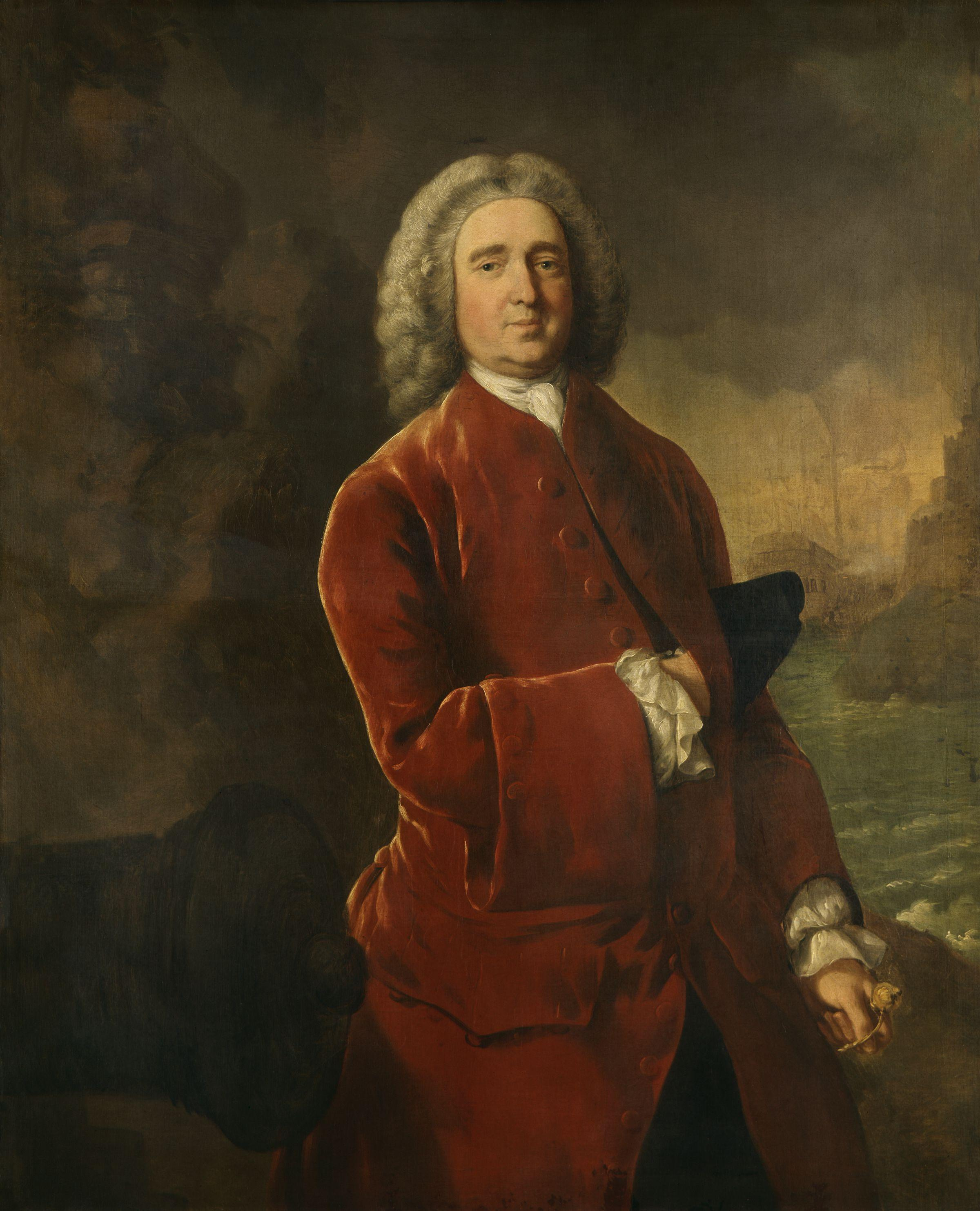
- Portrait of Edward Vernon by Thomas Gainsborough, 1753
- Born: 12 November 1684; Westminster, London
- Died: 30 October 1757 (aged 72); Nacton, Suffolk
- Military career
- Allegiance: Kingdom of England; Great Britain
- Branch: Royal Navy
- Service years: 1700–1746
- Rank: Admiral
- Nickname: "Old Grog"
- Commands: HMS Dolphin; HMS Rye; HMS Association; HMS Jersey; HMS Assistance; HMS Mary; HMS Grafton; Commander-in-chief Jamaica Station; Commander-in-chief North Sea
- Conflicts: War of the Spanish Succession; Capture of Gibraltar; Battle of Vélez-Málaga; Siege of Barcelona (1705); War of Jenkins' Ear; Battle of Portobelo (1739); Battle of Cartagena de Indias; Invasion of Cuba (1741)
- Other work: MP for Penryn; MP for Ipswich

Admiral Edward Vernon (12 November 1684 – 30 October 1757) was a Royal Navy officer and politician. He had a long and distinguished career, rising to the rank of admiral after 46 years service. As a vice admiral during the War of Jenkins' Ear, in 1739 he was responsible for the capture of Portobelo, Panama, seen as expunging the failure of Admiral Hosier there in a previous conflict. However, his amphibious operation against the Spanish port of Cartagena de Indias was a disastrous defeat. Vernon also served as a Member of Parliament (MP) on three occasions and was outspoken on naval matters in Parliament, making him a controversial figure.

The origin of the name "grog" for rum diluted with water is attributed to Vernon. He was known for wearing coats made of grogram cloth, earning him the nickname of "Old Grog", which in turn came to mean the diluted rum that he first introduced into his naval squadron. He is also the eponym of George Washington's estate Mount Vernon, and thereby the many places in the United States named after it.

== Early life ==
Born in Westminster, London, Vernon was the second son of James Vernon, secretary of state to William III. Edward had one other sibling, James who became British envoy to Denmark and served as a member of parliament and Clerk of the Privy Council. Vernon briefly attended Westminster School, then joined the Royal Navy on 10 May 1700 as a Volunteer per order on board HMS Shrewsbury. Vernon's secondary education was sharply at odds with the norm for Royal Navy officers of his day, most of whom received an elementary education before they were sent to sea at about the age of twelve.

== War of the Spanish Succession ==
In March 1701, he was transferred to HMS Ipswich and three months later, joined HMS Mary. On 16 September 1702, Vernon was promoted lieutenant and appointed to HMS Lennox serving in the Channel Squadron. The ship was later transferred to the Mediterranean and finally paid off in March 1704. He was then appointed to HMS Barfleur, which at the time was the flagship of Admiral Cloudesley Shovell in the Mediterranean. The ship was present at the capture of Gibraltar and the Battle of Málaga.

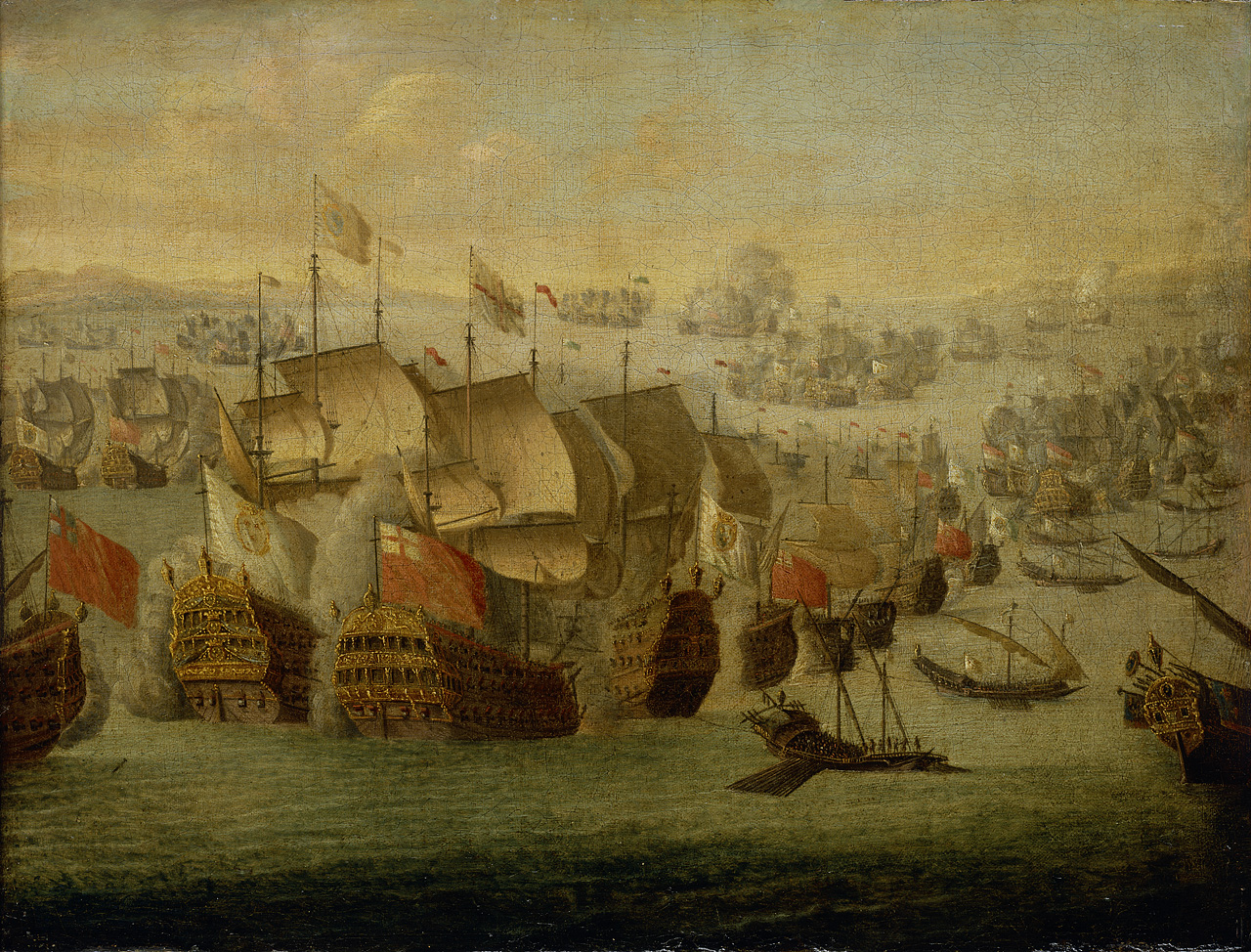
The Battle of Malaga (1704) by Isaac Sailmaker

In December, with Shovell, he transferred to HMS Britannia and was present at the capture of Barcelona in 1705.

On 22 January 1706, he was promoted captain and appointed to HMS Dolphin. However, he was moved ten days later into HMS Rye and remained in the Mediterranean until 1707. With the rest of Shovell's fleet, he returned to England, but was fortunate to escape the disaster that befell Shovell's flagship, HMS Association at the Isles of Scilly. In November, he joined HMS Jersey and in April 1708, took command of the West Indies station. In 1710, he successfully broke up a Spanish squadron off Cartagena. At the end of the War of the Spanish Succession in 1712, he returned to Britain.

=== Peace, promotion and Parliament ===
In March 1715, he was appointed to HMS Assistance, in which he served in the Baltic until 1717, when the ship was paid off. After this, he was put on half pay for the next eighteen months. In March 1719, he was appointed to HMS Mary and returned to the Baltic. Vernon was the commodore on the Jamaica Station in 1720.

In 1721, he again went on half pay for five years. During this period, he became the Member of Parliament for Penryn, a seat his father had represented, and took a leading part in naval debates.

In 1726, he was re-appointed to active service in HMS Grafton. This ship served in the Baltic until the winter of 1727, when it was transferred to the fleet at Gibraltar after Spain declared war on Britain. In May 1728, peace was made with Spain, and Vernon returned to Britain and resumed his Parliamentary duties. He took up the case of the Welshman Robert Jenkins, a merchant seaman who claimed to have had his ear cut off after his vessel was boarded by Spanish privateers Coast guards or privateers guardacostas in 1731.

== War of Jenkins' Ear ==
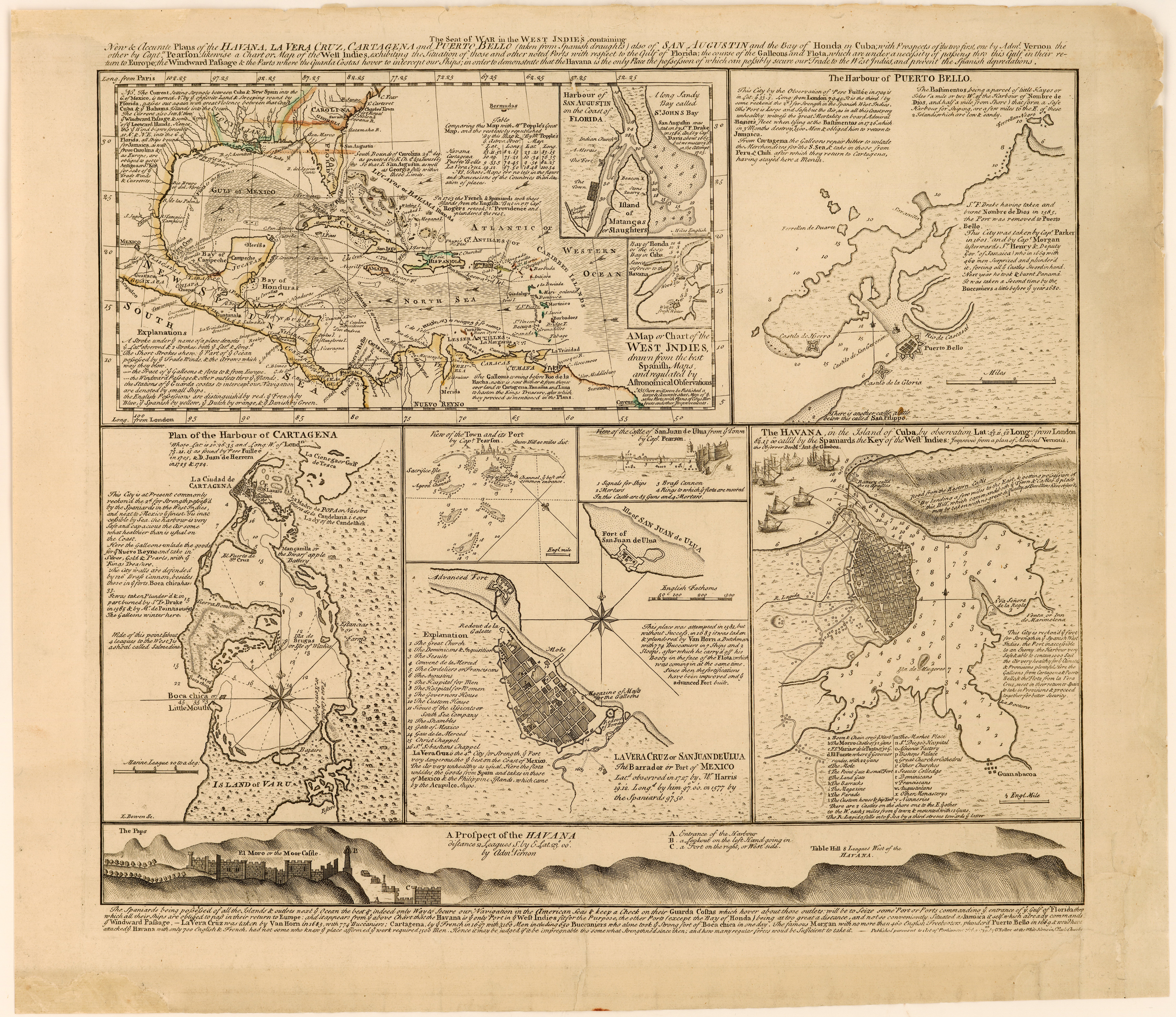
English map published in 1740 to build support for the ongoing war against Spain and to incite to the conquest of Havana. This city's plan and view are based in part on Vernon's sketches.

The accumulation of Spanish-British conflicts led to the War of Jenkins' Ear in 1739, in which Vice Admiral Vernon led a fleet along with Major General Thomas Wentworth. Vernon captured Portobelo, Panama, a Spanish colonial possession, as a result of which he was granted the Freedom of the City of London. However, Vernon's next campaign against the Spanish, a large-scale assault on Cartagena de Indias in 1741, ended in disaster. After initial success, the British fleet of 186 ships and around 12,000 infantry was defeated by a garrison of 3,500 men and the sailors disembarked from the six ships of the line commanded by the one-eyed, one-legged and one-armed Spanish admiral Blas de Lezo. As disease spread among the British troops, delaying tactics by the Spaniards and a failed assault on the last fortification defending the city led a council of war to decide to abandon the siege and withdraw to Jamaica. The assault was further marred by bitter quarrels with Wentworth. After a further year and a half ineffectually campaigning in the Caribbean, Vernon was recalled back to England to find he had been elected MP for Ipswich.

During the War of Jenkins' Ear, Vernon was promoted vice admiral of the blue on 9 July 1739 and, as he had prominently spoken for both the war and the Navy, he was given the command of a squadron of six ships assigned to the Jamaica Station. The Gentleman's Magazine reported England's preparations for war against Spain in July 1739, noting that Vernon had been recalled to active duty and promoted; that, on 10 July King George II had instructed the Lords of the Admiralty to prepare Letters of Marque; and (a week after the fact) it reported Vernon and his squadron had sailed for the West Indies on 20 July.

Despite the unmistakable signs of Great Britain preparing for a naval war in the summer of 1739, the formal declaration of war against Spain was not announced in London until Saturday, 23 October 1739.

=== Portobelo ===
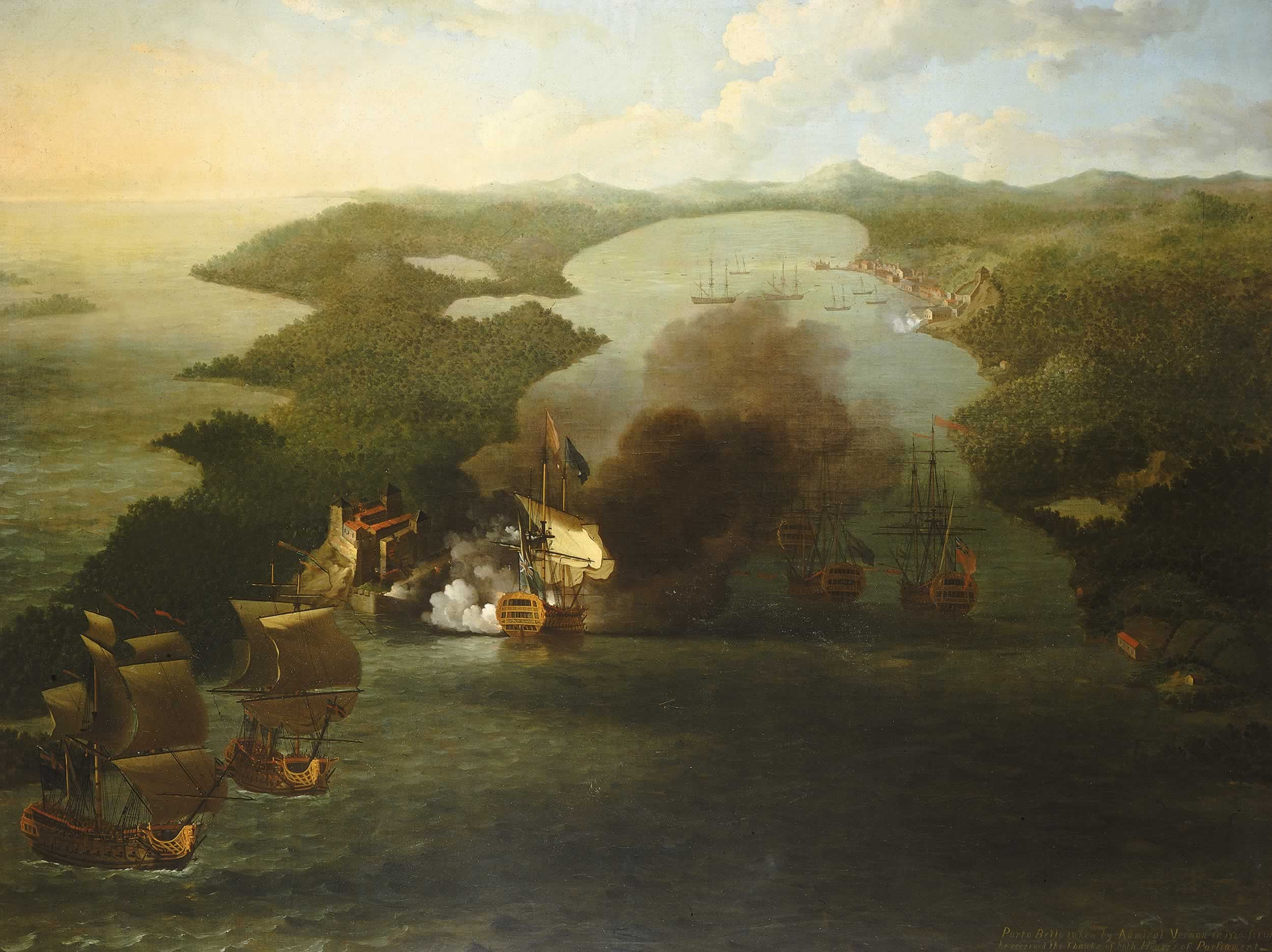
The Capture of Puerto Bello by Samuel Scott, 1740

On 21 November 1739 Vernon captured the Spanish colonial possession of Portobelo, Panama (now in Panama) using just six ships (against the 90-man Spanish garrison). Vernon was subsequently granted the Freedom of the City of London and commemorative medals were produced. The Portobello areas in London, Dublin and Edinburgh (see Portobello Road and Portobello, Dublin) are named after this victory, and "Rule, Britannia!" was composed by Thomas Arne during the celebrations in 1740. A tower commemorating his victory was erected by members of the Vernon family living at Hilton Hall outside Wolverhampton.

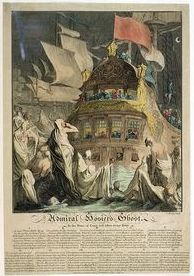
The Ghost of Hosier appears to Vernon as he rests at anchor after his victory. Coloured etching by C. Mosley, July 1740. National Maritime Museum, Greenwich (PW 3959)

=== Addressed by Hosier's Ghost ===
Vernon's action was seen by the "Patriots", or pro-war party opposed to Robert Walpole, as just vengeance for Admiral Hosier's disastrous blockade of Porto Bello during 1726–1728, where with a greater force of 20 ships, and Portobelo inadequately defended, government orders forbade him from firing a shot, leaving him and some 4,000 sailors to linger ineffectually off the shore and to die of tropical disease. The ballad "Admiral Hosier's Ghost" was written by Richard Glover following Vernon's triumph as an attempt to remind Walpole of his previous failed policy of inaction and to check any basking in Vernon's glory on his part. In the ballad, the ghost of Hosier appears to Vernon as he rests at anchor following his successful engagement, and congratulates him:

Unrepining at thy glory
Thy successful arms we hail.

He then charges him to let Hosier's wrongs prevail when he returns to England, upon which he and his fellow ghosts can finally rest, their reputations restored. The first half of verse 7 is thus:

For resistance I could fear none
But with twenty ships had done
What thou brave and happy Vernon
Hast atchiev'd with six alone.

=== Cartagena de Indias ===
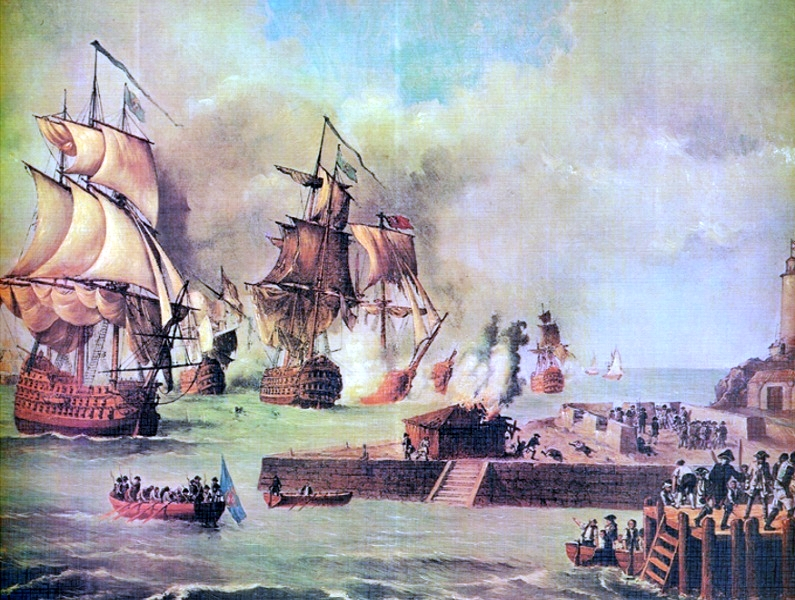
Attack of the British army on Cartagena de Indias commanded by Vice Admiral Edward Vernon

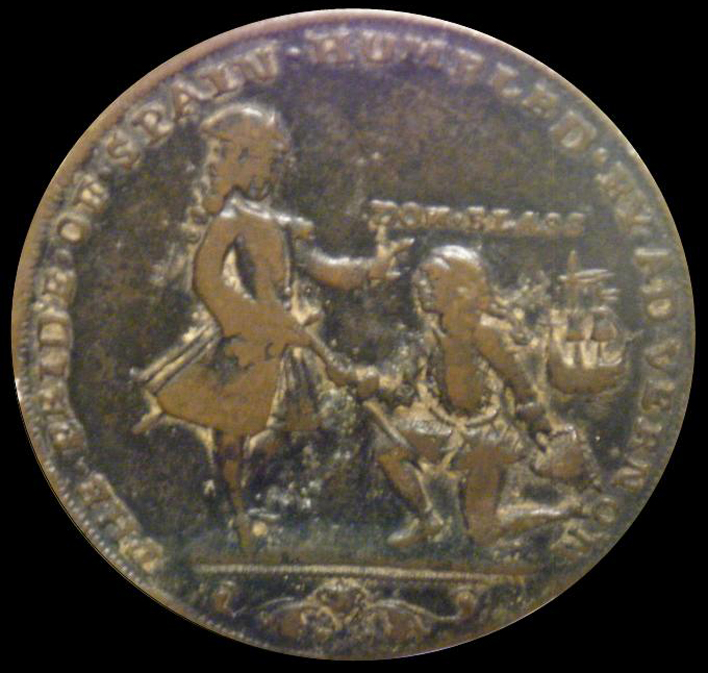
British medal commemorating the expected victory of Cartagena de Indias, that actually ended in defeat. It shows Vernon looking down upon the Spanish admiral Blas de Lezo ("Don Blass"). The medal says "The pride of Spain humbled by ad. Vernon". Museo Naval de Madrid, Spain.

In 1741 he commanded a great fleet formed by one hundred and ninety-five ships and around thirty thousand men whose objective was to take the Spanish port of Cartagena de Indias, main port of the Viceroyalty of New Granada, defended by the Spanish admiral Blas de Lezo. The British fleet totaled two thousand cannons arranged in almost one hundred and eighty ships, including three-bridge ships (eight), ships of the line (twenty-eight), frigates (twelve), bombards (two) and transport ships (one hundred and thirty), and around thirty thousand combatants including sailors (fifteen thousand), soldiers (nine thousand regulars and four thousand from the American militias) and black slaves from Jamaica (four thousand).

The defences of Cartagena included three thousand men among regular troops (about one thousand seven hundred and eighty), militiamen (five hundred), six hundred Indians brought from the interior, plus the seamen and landing troops of the six warships that the city had (one hundred and fifty men): the Galicia, which was the captain ship, the San Felipe, the San Carlos, the África, the Dragón and the Conquistador. After taking some of the city's defences, the British assault on the castle San Felipe de Barajas, the last important bastion defending it, failed on April 20; with a large part of the troops ill, heavy casualties suffered in the fighting and the arrival of the rainy season, the British opted to destroy the defences within their reach and abandon the siege.

British losses were very heavy: some four thousand five hundred dead, six ships lost and between seventeen and twenty badly damaged.4 The latter forced the British Government to concentrate its forces on the defence of the metropolis, the northern Atlantic and the Mediterranean, and to discard new campaigns in the Spanish colonies in America.4 The defeat at Cartagena derailed British plans for the campaign and allowed Spanish rule in the region to continue for several more decades.5 The British, certain that they were going to take the victory, had rushed to mint coins and medals to celebrate it.6 These medals read on their obverse: "British heroes took Cartagena April 1, 1741" and "Spanish pride humiliated by Vernon. "76

Vernon's expedition continued its operations in the Caribbean without further success after the failed attack on Santiago de Cuba, thanks to the defence plan deployed by Governor Francisco Cagigal de la Vega and the French engineer Francisco de Langle.8 Vernon returned to England with the bulk of the fleet in 1742.

At the end of May 1741, the British forces in the Caribbean decided to attack Cuba. Vernon captured Guantánamo Bay, briefly renaming it Cumberland Bay. He arrived with a force of eight warships and 4,000 soldiers with plans to march on Santiago de Cuba, but finally abandoned the half-hearted attempt in December after sickness broke out again. Vernon could no longer hold back his anger at what he perceived as Wentworth's ineptitude and a bitter quarrel ensued ending in the recall of both parties to Britain at the end of 1742.

== Further political career, naval innovation and death ==
While he had been away, Vernon had been elected MP for Ipswich, after having purchased the Orwell Park estate in Nacton, Suffolk. Vernon returned to Parliament and continued to harass the government on naval affairs. In 1745, Vernon was promoted to admiral and appointed to command the North Sea Fleet in response to the threat from the French forces in support of Charles Edward Stuart ("Bonnie Prince Charlie"). This was his last operational command. When the Admiralty refused to grant him the status of Commander-in-Chief, he asked to be relieved on 1 December 1745. Vernon's naval career had, however, a controversial ending. He wrote two pamphlets about his disagreements with the Admiralty. The first was entitled "A Specimen of Naked Truth from a British Sailor" and the second "Some Seasonal Advice from an Honest Sailor". As a result, the Admiralty brought the matter to King George II who advised to have his name removed from the navy flag list. He was dismissed on 11 April 1746. After this, his political career was seen to go into decline, although he held on to his Ipswich seat in the 1754 general election despite a stiff challenge.

Throughout his career, Vernon had tried to improve naval procedures and encouraged his captains to improve manoeuvres and gun drill. He introduced new instructions to improve the flexibility of handling fleets in battle and formed the basis of continuing improvement to Admiralty fighting instructions by subsequent naval commanders. Vernon continued to serve in Parliament and remained active in the interest of naval affairs until his death at Nacton on 30 October 1757.

His enduring claim to fame was his 1740 order that his sailors' rum should be diluted with water. In 1740, supposedly calling the new drink "grog" after Vernon's nickname "Old Grog", attributed to his habitual wearing of a grogram coat. Some writers have claimed that Vernon also added citrus juice to prevent spoilage and that it was found to prevent scurvy. Scurvy is not mentioned in Vernon's order, in which he instructed his captains to dilute the sailors' daily allowance of rum with water, "which those that are good husbandmen may from the saving of their salt provisions and bread, purchase sugar and limes to make more palatable to them."^{]}

Scurvy, a disease of long ocean voyages—not of squadrons operating among islands where there was an abundance of fruits and fresh foodstuffs—was seen by the medical establishment (incorrectly) as the consequence of poor digestion and internal putrefaction.^{[4]} Standard medical remedies focused on 'gingering up' the system by imbibing a variety of (ineffective) fizzy or fermenting drinks. Until an official daily issue of lemon juice was introduced into the Royal Navy in 1795, scurvy continued to be a debilitating disease which destroyed men and disabled ships and whole fleets. Practical seamen and surgeons, however, had known from practical experience that vitamin C, in the form of citrus juice, cured scurvy. In 1795, in defiance of medical opinion, the Admiralty and the admirals introduced lemon juice and sugar as a regular part of the naval diet. When a few years later Spain allied itself with France and lemons became unobtainable, West Indian limes were substituted. It was from this time that British obtained the nickname limeys.

== Mount Vernon ==
George Washington's elder half-brother, Lawrence Washington, served on Vernon's flagship HMS Princess Caroline (an 80-gun three-decker) as a captain of Royal Marines in 1741. He named his Virginia estate Mount Vernon in honour of his former commander, a name retained by George Washington.

== Notes ==
Military offices
Preceded by Vacant (Last held by Sir Hovenden Walker)	Commander-in-Chief, Jamaica Station; 1720	Succeeded by Vacant (Next held by Francis Hosier)
Preceded by Sir Chaloner Ogle	Commander-in-Chief, Jamaica Station; 1739–1742	Succeeded by Sir Chaloner Ogle
Parliament of Great Britain
Preceded by Viscount Rialton; Samuel Trefusis	Member of Parliament for Penryn; 1722–1734; With: Sidney Meadows 1722–1727; Sir Cecil Bishopp 1727–1734	Succeeded by Sir Richard Mill; John Clavering
Preceded by Charles Stewart	Member of Parliament for Portsmouth; February 1741 - April 1741; With: Philip Cavendish	Succeeded by Martin Bladen
Preceded by William Wollaston; Samuel Kent	Member of Parliament for Ipswich; 1741–1757; With: Samuel Kent	Succeeded by Thomas Staunton; Samuel Kent
