= The Capture of Puerto Bello =

Painting by Samuel Scott

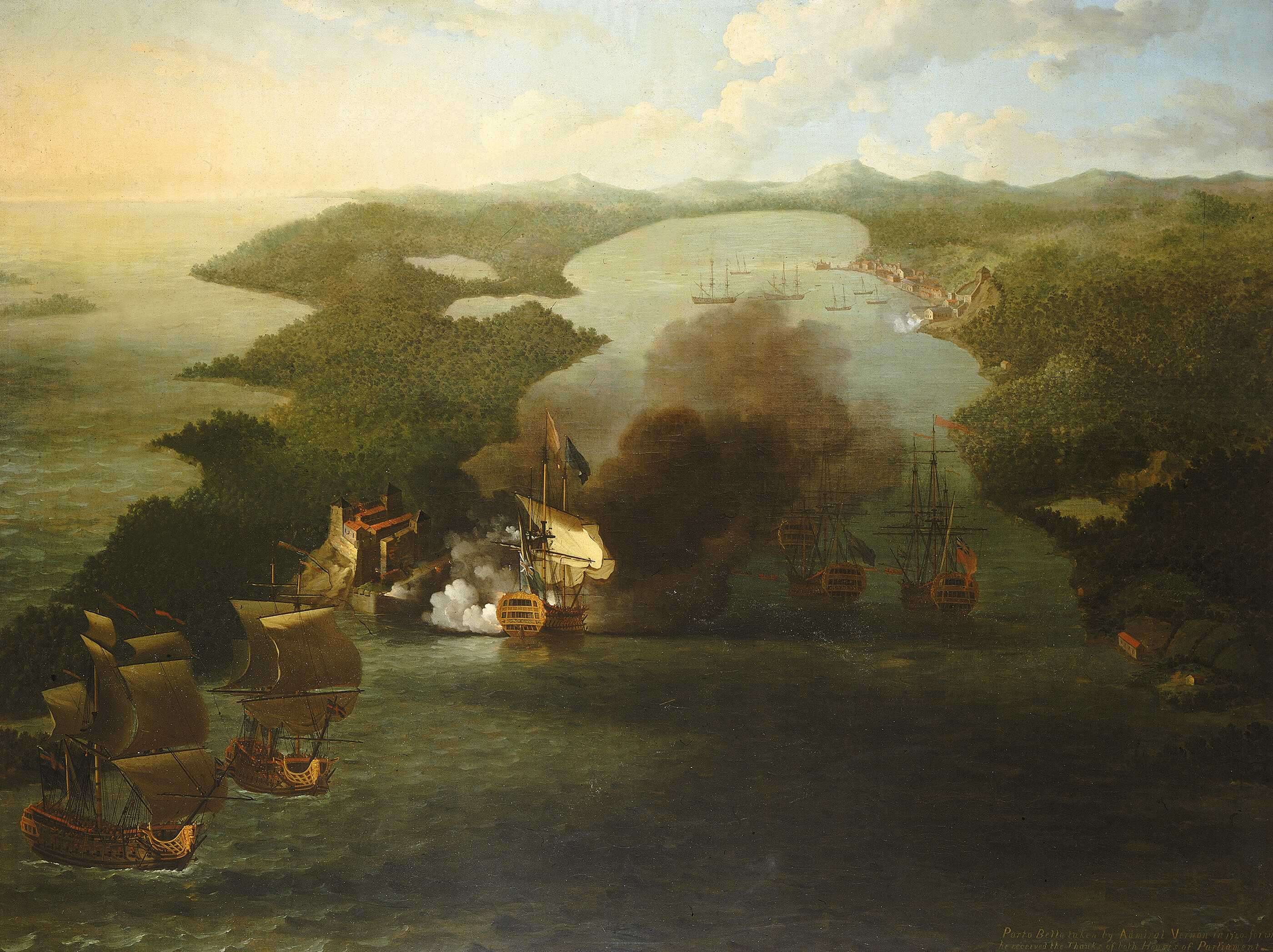
- Artist: Samuel Scott
- Year: 1740
- Type: Oil on canvas, historical maritime painting
- Dimensions: 208.3 cm × 276.9 cm (82.0 in × 109.0 in)
- Location: National Maritime Museum, Greenwich

The Capture of Puerto Bello is an oil on canvas history maritime painting by the British artist Samuel Scott, from 1740.

== History and description ==
It depicts the Battle of Porto Bello in November 1739, the opening act of the War of Jenkins' Ear between Great Britain and Spain. The Royal Navy admiral Edward Vernon led a force to seize the strategic Spanish settlement of Portobelo in Panama. Scott, a noted painter of seascapes before he later specialised in views of the River Thames, portrays the action from a panoramic distance. Today the painting is in the collection of the National Maritime Museum in Greenwich. The attack on the port was also notably painted again in 1838 by George Chambers, a work also in the collection at Greenwich.

== See also ==
- Portrait of Edward Vernon by Thomas Gainsborough, 1753

== Bibliography ==
- Bonehill, John. (ed.) Art for the Nation: The Oil Paintings Collections of the National Maritime Museum. National Maritime Museum, 2006.
- Sholvin, John. Trading with the Enemy: Britain, France, and the 18th-Century Quest for a Peaceful World Order. Yale University Press, 2021.
