= HMS Seaford (1697) =

British warship

History

England
- Name: HMS Seaford
- Ordered: 24 December 1696
- Builder: Royal Dockyard, Portsmouth
- Launched: 15 October 1697
- Commissioned: 28 October 1697
- Out of service: August 1722
- Reclassified: Bomb vessel 1727; 20-gun sixth rate 1728
- Reinstated: 1727
- Fate: Broken at Woolwich April to June 1740

General characteristics
- Type: 24-gun sixth rate
- Tons burthen: 248 5/94 bm
- Length: 93 ft 2 in (28.4 m) gundeck; 77 ft 2 in (23.5 m) keel for tonnage
- Beam: 24 ft 7 in (7.5 m) for tonnage
- Depth of hold: 10 ft 10 in (3.3 m)
- Armament: initially as ordered; 20 × sakers on wooden trucks (UD); 4 × 3-pdr on wooden trucks (QD); 1703 Establishment; 20 × 6-pdrs on wooden trucks (UD); 4 × 4-pdr on wooden trucks (QD)

General characteristics As Rebuilt 1727
- Class & type: 20-gun, Sixth Rate
- Tons burthen: 37580/94 bm
- Length: 106 ft 0 in (32.31 m) gundeck; 87 ft 6 in (26.67 m) keel for tonnage
- Beam: 28 ft 5.5 in (8.674 m) maximum
- Depth of hold: 9 ft 2 in (2.79 m)
- Sail plan: ship-rigged
- Armament: 20 × 6-pdrs on upper deck

HMS Seaford was a member of the standardized 20-gun sixth rates built at the end of the 17th century. After she was commissioned she had a very varied career, starting in the Mediterranean then the Irish Sea, then to Newfoundland, the North Sea followed by a great repair then to the Leeward Islands. She was dismantled in 1722 and rebuilt as a bomb vessel in 1727 than a 20-gun sixth rate in 1728. She served in the West Indies, America and the Mediterranean. She was finally broken in 1740.

Seaford was the second ship to bear this name since it was used for a 24-gun sixth rate purchased from Richard Herring of Bursledon on 27 December 1695 and captured by the French off the Scilly Islands on 5 May 1697 and burnt.

== Construction ==
She was ordered in the Fourth Batch of four ships from Portsmouth Dockyard to be built under the guidance of their Master Shipwright, William Bagwell. She was launched on 15 October 1697.

== Commissioned service ==
She was commissioned on 28 October 1697 under the command of Captain Charles Strickland, RN. In 1699 she sail for the Mediterranean where Captain John Watkins, RN, assumed command. In 1701 Captain George Clements, RN, was her commander followed by Commander George Saunders, RN (promoted to Captain January 1705) in 1703. Both served in the Irish Sea. She took the French privateer La Russe on 2 April 1704. 1705 thru 1710 her commander was Captain George Rodgers, RN, remaining in the Irish Sea. She took the privateers La Marie-Anne on 17 April 1708 and La Duchesse on 28 August 1708. In 1711 Commander Thomas Dravers, RN (promoted to Captain 1 January 1713) for voyage to Newfoundland in 1711, assigned to North Sea in 1712. She underwent a great repair in 1712 and 1713. She then voyaged to New York between 1714 and 15. In 1716 she was under Captain John Rose, RN, for service in the leeward Islands returning in 1719.

== Rebuild at Deptford 1727 ==
Her dismantling in preparation to rebuild was completed in August 1722 at Deptford. She was ordered to be rebuilt as a 374-ton (builder's measure) 20 gun sixth rate under the guidance of the Deptford Master Shipwright, Richard Stacey. Her keel was considered laid upon completion of dismantling in August 1722. She was launched on 22 October 1724. Her dimensions were now gundeck of 106 feet 0 inches (32.3 metres) with her keel 87 feet 3 inches (26.6 metres) reported for tonnage. Her breadth was 28 feet 5.5 inches (8.7 metres). Her depth of hold was 9 feet 2 inches (2.8 metres). Her builder's Measure tonnage was 37580/94 tons. She carried a standardize armament of twenty 6-pounders on the upper deck (UD). She was a full rigged ship. Under Admiralty Order (AO) March 1727 she was completed for sea as a bomb vessel in April 1727 at a cost of £4,676.15.1d (Note: A total cost accounting for inflation of approximately £729,100 in today's money.) for building and £1,010.3.7d (Note: A total cost accounting for inflation of approximately £157,500 in today's money.) for fitting.

== Commissioned service after rebuild ==
She was commissioned as a bomb vessel in 1727 under the command of Captain Perry Mayne, RN, for service in the Baltic. However. she was then converted into a 20-gun sixth rate in 1728. She was in Jamaica in 1729. March 1731 she was under command of Captain William Laws, RN. She was ordered home, paying off on 4 October 1731. She underwent a middling repair at Woolwich at a cost of 3,090.12.7d (Note: A total cost accounting for inflation of approximately £660,400 in today's money.) from November to February 1732. In 1732 she was under the command of Captain Robert Long, RN, for service at New York. She returned and was paid off in June 1735. She underwent a small repair at Woolwich at a cost of 2,073.8.5d (Note: A total cost accounting for inflation of approximately £388,400 in today's money.) on 7 December 1735. In 1737 her bottom was graved with a new composition. She was recommissioned in March 1737 under Captain Henry Scott, RN (later known as Lord Deloraine) for service at South Carolina. In November 1739 Captain Savage Moyston, RN, took command and went to Lisbon followed by a stint in the Mediterranean.

== Disposition ==
She was broken between April and June 1740 at Woolwich.
