= HMS Worcester (1735) =

Ship of the line of the Royal Navy

History

Great Britain
- Name: HMS Worcester
- Ordered: 4 September 1733
- Builder: Portsmouth Dockyard
- Launched: 20 December 1735
- Fate: Broken up, 1765

General characteristics
- Class & type: 1733 proposals 60-gun fourth rate ship of the line
- Tons burthen: 1061 (bm)
- Length: 144 ft (43.9 m) (gundeck)
- Beam: 41 ft 5 in (12.6 m)
- Depth of hold: 16 ft 11 in (5.2 m)
- Propulsion: Sails
- Sail plan: Full-rigged ship
- Armament: 60 guns: Gundeck: 24 × 24-pounder guns; Upper gundeck: 26 × 9-pounder guns; Quarterdeck: 8 × 6-pounder guns; Forecastle: 2 × 6-pounder guns

HMS Worcester was a 60-gun fourth rate ship of the line of the Royal Navy, built by Joseph Allin the younger at Portsmouth Dockyard to the 1733 proposals of the 1719 Establishment, and launched on 20 December 1735.

She took part in the battle of Portobello under Captain Perry Mayne in 1739.

Worcester was broken up in 1765.
