= Portrait of Edward Vernon =

1753 painting by Thomas Gainsborough

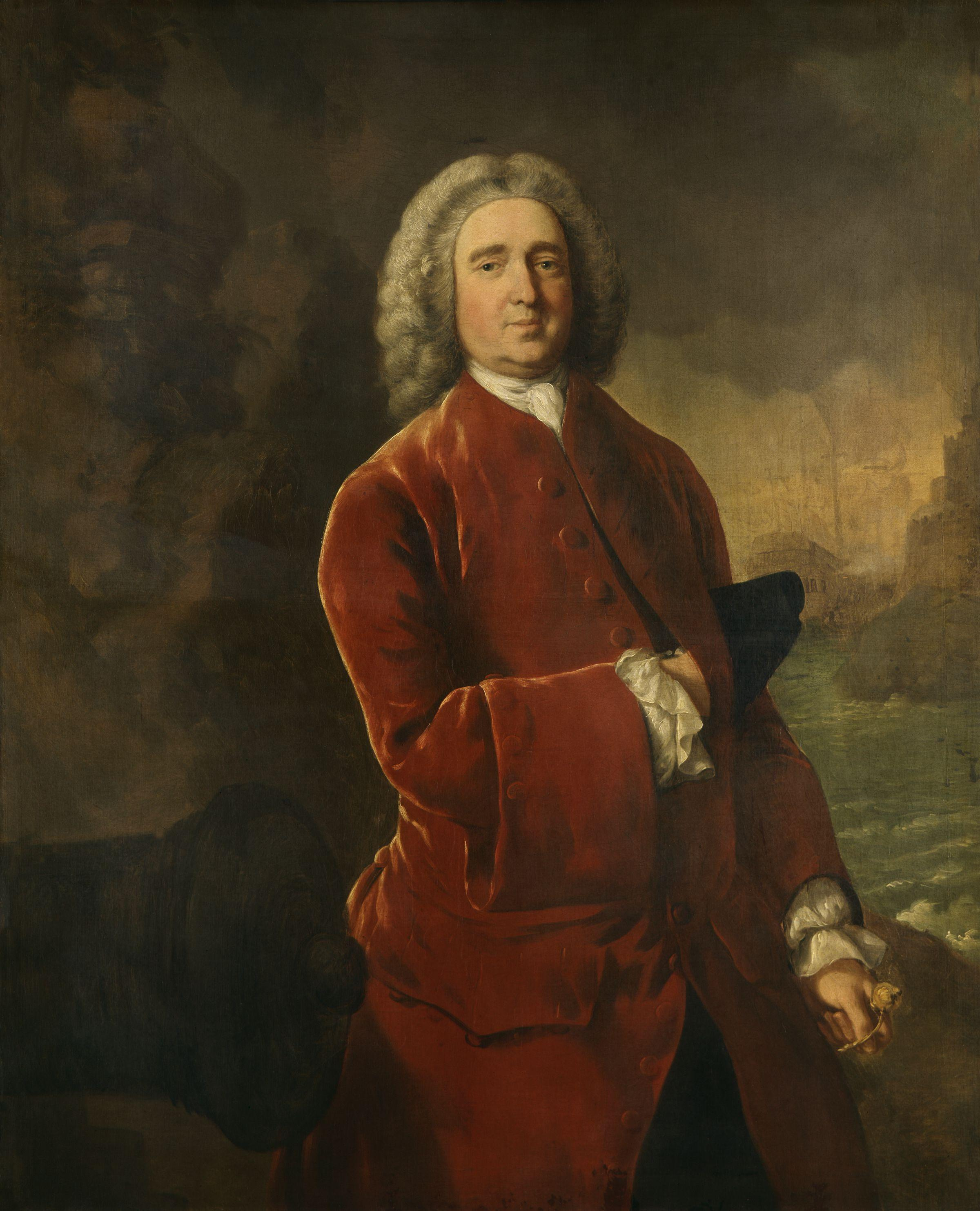
- Artist: Thomas Gainsborough
- Year: 1753
- Type: Oil on canvas, portrait painting
- Dimensions: 126.4 cm × 103.8 cm (49.8 in × 40.9 in)
- Location: National Portrait Gallery; London

Portrait of Edward Vernon is an oil on canvas portrait painting by the English artist Thomas Gainsborough, from 1753. It depicts the Royal Navy officer and politician Edward Vernon.

== History ==
Vernon became a national hero following his capture of Porto Bello in 1739 during the War of Jenkins' Ear. His subsequent Attack on Cartagena was much less successful. When he sat for Gainsborough he was the Member of Parliament for Ipswich. The Suffolk-born Gainsborough was working in the town at the time and would only move to Bath in 1759. It was a watershed moment for the artist who switched from the doll-like style that featured in early works like Mr and Mrs Andrews to a broader manner in composition and brushwork. It was likely painted at Orwell Park, Vernon's country estate at Nacton outside Ipswich.

Today the painting is in the collection of the National Portrait Gallery having been acquired in 1891. It is on display at Gainsborough's House a museum in Sudbury where it is on loan.

== Bibliography ==
- Belsey, Hugh. Thomas Gainsborough: A Country Life. Prestel, 2002.
- Hamilton, James. Gainsborough: A Portrait. Hachette UK, 2017.
