= Perry Mayne =

Royal Navy officer (1697–1761)

Vice-Admiral Perry Mayne
- Born: c.1697
- Died: 5 August 1761
- Military career
- Allegiance: Kingdom of Great Britain
- Branch: Royal Navy
- Service years: 1715–1757
- Rank: Vice-Admiral
- Commands: HMS Spence; HMS Dragon; HMS Seaford; HMS Lion; HMS Worcester; HMS Orford; HMS Princess; Nore Command
- Conflicts: War of Jenkins' Ear; Battle of Porto Bello; Battle of Cartagena de Indias

Vice-Admiral Perry Mayne (c.1697 – 5 August 1761) was a Royal Navy officer who served as Commander-in-Chief, The Nore from 1746 to 1747.

== Naval career ==
Mayne became commanding officer of the sloop HMS Spence in 1724. Promoted to captain in September 1725, he commanded, successively, the fourth-rate HMS Dragon, the sixth-rate HMS Seaford, the third-rate HMS Lion and the fourth-rate HMS Worcester. He saw action at the battle of Porto Bello in November 1739 and at the battle of Cartagena de Indias in May 1741. After that he commanded the third-rate HMS Orford, then the third-rate HMS Princess and finally the third-rate HMS Orford again. He served as Commander-in-Chief, The Nore from 1746 to 1747.

Mayne presided over the courtmartial of Admirals Thomas Mathews and Richard Lestock in May 1746. He lived at a house which he named "Portobello", to recall the battle in which he had seen action, in Mortlake.
