= Thomas Arnold (Royal Navy officer) =

English officer of the Royal Navy

Thomas Arnold (1679 – 31 August 1737) was an English officer of the Royal Navy.

== Life ==
Arnold was descended from a family which had been settled for many generations in Lowestoft, and was, in 1718, first lieutenant of HMS Superb. He distinguished himself in the battle of Cape Passaro on 11 August 1718 by heading the boarders and carrying the Spanish flagship, the Real Felipe, and in this service he was severely wounded, and lost the use of one arm. His gallantry was rewarded by his promotion, probably by Sir George Byng, to the rank of commander; in 1727 he was advanced to be a captain, appointed to command HMS Fox, and sent to the coast of Carolina, where he was for some time under the orders of Captain George Anson.

On his return to England he retired from active service and settled at Lowestoft, where he died on 31 August 1737. A monument in Lowestoft church still keeps alive his memory, which, throughout the last century, was further distinguished by a local custom now obsolete. 'It is customary,' wrote Gillingwater in 1790, 'at Lowestoft to hang flags across the streets at weddings. The colours belonging to the Royal Philip taken by Lieutenant Arnold have frequently been made use of upon these occasions.'
