= HMS Rye (1696) =

History

England
- Name: HMS Rye
- Ordered: 27 December 1694
- Builder: Sheerness Dockyard
- Launched: 17 June 1696
- Commissioned: 20 December 1695
- Fate: Sunk as a breakwater at Harwich in July 1727

General characteristics as built
- Class & type: 32-gun fifth rate
- Tons burthen: 38429/94 tons (bm)
- Length: 109 ft 6.5 in (33.39 m) gundeck; 90 ft 0 in (27.43 m) keel for tonnage
- Beam: 28 ft 4 in (8.64 m)
- Depth of hold: 11 ft 3 in (3.43 m)
- Propulsion: Sails
- Sail plan: Full-rigged ship
- Complement: 145/110
- Armament: as built 32 guns; 4/4 × demi-culverins (LD); 22/20 × 6-pdr guns (UD); 6/4 × 4-pdr guns (QD)

HMS Rye was a 32-gun fifth rate built at Sheerness Dockyard in 1694/96.

She was the first vessel to carry the name Rye in the English and Royal Navy.

== Construction and specifications ==
She was ordered on 27 December 1694 to be built at Sheerness Dockyard under the guidance of Master Shipwright Robert Shortiss. She was launched on 7 June 1696. Her dimensions were a gundeck of 109 feet 6.5 inches (33.39 metres) with a keel of 90 feet 0 inches (27.43 metres) for tonnage calculation with a breadth of 28 feet 4 inches (8.64 metres) and a depth of hold of 11 feet 3 inches (3.43 metres). Her builder’s measure tonnage was calculated as 38429/94 tons (burthen).

The gun armament initially was four demi-culverins (Note: A demi-culverin was a gun of 3,400 pounds with a four-inch bore firing a 9.5-pound shot with an eight-pound powder charge) on the lower deck (LD) with two pair of guns per side. The upper deck (UD) battery would consist of between twenty and twenty-two 6-pounder guns (Note: A 6-pounder was a Dutch gun used to replace the saker) with ten or eleven guns per side. The gun battery would be completed by four 4-pounder guns (Note: A minion renamed the 4-pounder was a gun of 1,000 pounds with a 3.5-inch bore firing a 4-pound shot with a 4-pound powder charge.) on the quarterdeck (QD) with two to three guns per side.

== Commissioned Service 1696-1721 ==
She was commissioned on 20 December 1695 under the command of Captain Richard Haddock. He held command until 1700. In concert with HMS Weymouth she helped take the 46-gun Le Fougueux on 10 June 1696. With HMS Plymouth, they took the privateers 36-gun Le Nouveau Cherbourg and the 28-gun Le Dauphin on 5 February 1697, then she took the privateer Le Duc de Chaulnes on 6 February 1697. On the 25th of February with both the Plymouth and Severn the squadron took six merchantmen and an 8-gun man-of-war. She took the privateer La Marquise de Maintenon on 16 July 1697 and the L'Amitie on 28 August 1697. She sailed to Sale, Morocco in 1700. In July 1702 under the command of Captain James Carlton on counter piracy patrol in the North Sea. She took the privateers Le Rossignol-Courronne on 26 February 1703 and the Le Saint-Antoine on 17 April 1704. She was assigned to the English Channel and the Bay of Biscay in 1706. In 1706 she was under the command of Captain Edward Vernon for service in the Mediterranean. Captain John Shales took command in November 1707 for service with Sir John Byng's Fleet at the Downs and North Sea in 1708. She escorted a Newfoundland bound convoy in 1710.

She underwent a large repair at Woolwich Dockyard from December 1711 to April 1712. She recommissioned in 1712 under Captain Robert Pearson then escorted a Russian convoy. She was off Sale, Morocco in 1713. Upon her return she underwent a repair at Sheerness costing £1,183.6.4d (Note: A total cost accounting for inflation of approximately £199,900 in today's money) from June to November 1714. In 1715 she was under the command of Captain Arthur Field for service on the Irish Station. In accordance with Admiralty Order (AO) 17 January 1718 she was reduced to a 24-gun sixth rate with a small repair at Sheerness for a cost of £1,614.18.8d (Note: A total cost accounting for inflation of approximately £305,200 in today's money) from January to March 1718. When completed she was under the command of Captain Thomas Whorwood (until 1721) for a convoy to Newfoundland. She then moved on to Virginia in 1720. She was paid off by 1721.

== Disposition ==
She sailed to Sheerness on 5 July 1727. By AO 4 April 1727 she was to be sunk as a breakwater at Harwich during the month of July.
