= HMS Superb (1710) =

64-gun third-rate ship of the line of the British Royal Navy

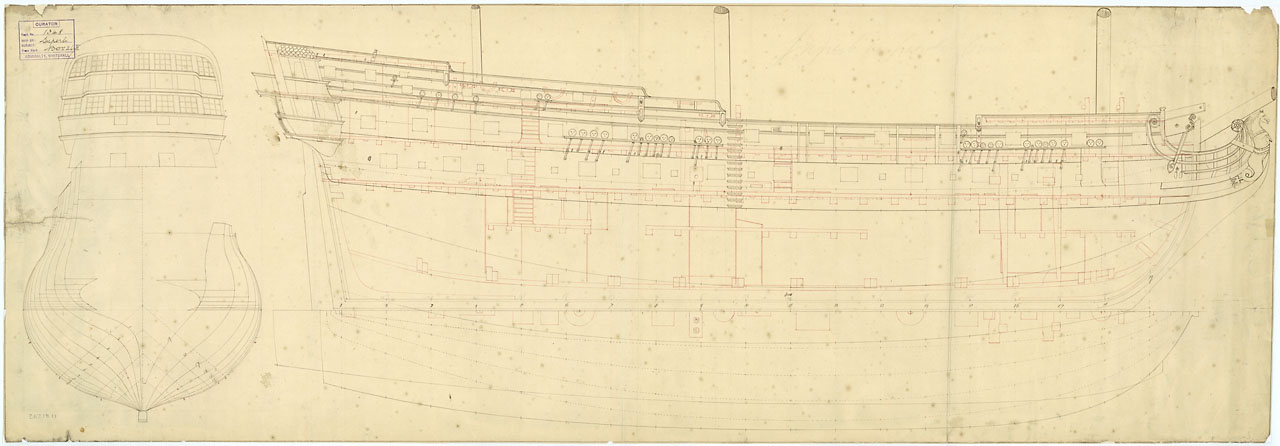
- Superb

History

France
- Name: Superbe
- Builder: Lorient
- Launched: 12 December 1708
- Captured: 29 July 1710 by the Royal Navy

Great Britain
- Name: HMS Superb
- Commissioned: 23 September 1710
- Decommissioned: 1732
- Honours and awards: Battle of Cape Passaro (1718)
- Fate: Broken up in 1733

General characteristics
- Class & type: 64-gun third-rate ship of the line
- Tons burthen: 1,020 23/94 (bm)
- Length: 143 ft 6 in (43.74 m)
- Beam: 40 ft 2 in (12.24 m)
- Sail plan: Full-rigged ship
- Complement: 365
- Armament: 56/58/64 guns

HMS Superb was a 64-gun third-rate ship of the line of the British Royal Navy. She had previously been Superbe, a 56-gun warship of the French Navy, until her capture off Lizard Point by HMS Kent in July 1710. Commissioned into the Royal Navy in September 1710, HMS Superb served throughout Queen Anne's War and the War of the Quadruple Alliance, during which she participated in the Battle of Cape Passaro in 1718. She was broken up in 1732.

== Construction ==
Superbe was designed by Pierre Blaise Coulomb and constructed between August 1708 and March 1709 at Lorient, a French naval base on the coast of Brittany in north-west France. She was launched on 12 December 1708 and measured 143 ft 6 in (43.74 m) along her gundeck, had a beam of 40 ft 2 in (12.24 m) and drew from 17 ft 0 in (5.18 m) at the bow, to 18 ft 6 in (5.64 m) at the stern. With a depth in the hold of 15 ft 6.5 in (4.737 m), she had a capacity of 1,020 23/94 tons (bm).

== Career (Royal Navy) ==
On 29 July 1710 Superbe was captured off The Lizard by HMS Kent. She was commissioned into the Royal Navy as HMS Superb on 23 September 1710 and sailed under Commander, later Captain, William Elford. In 1711 she passed to Captain James Moneypenny and was ordered to the Mediterranean. In September 1712, HMS Superb together with HMS Cornwall, Mary and Lion, assisted Admiral John Jennings with the landing of troops at Barcelona before being sent to Genoa with dispatches. In May 1713 she sailed with HMS Ormonde from Sicily to Leghorn via Naples before being ordered home later that year.

On 24 September 1716, while anchored in The Downs off Deal, Superb was blown off station in a violent storm. She returned without serious damage, however, on 3 October.

In 1717 HMS Superb was in the Baltic commanded by Captain George Saunders, but by the middle of the following year she was back in the Mediterranean after a refit at Chatham. Under Captain Strensham Master, and attached to George Byng's fleet, Superb spent the next few months cruising and delivering dispatches before playing an active role in the Battle of Cape Passaro.

=== Battle of Cape Passaro ===
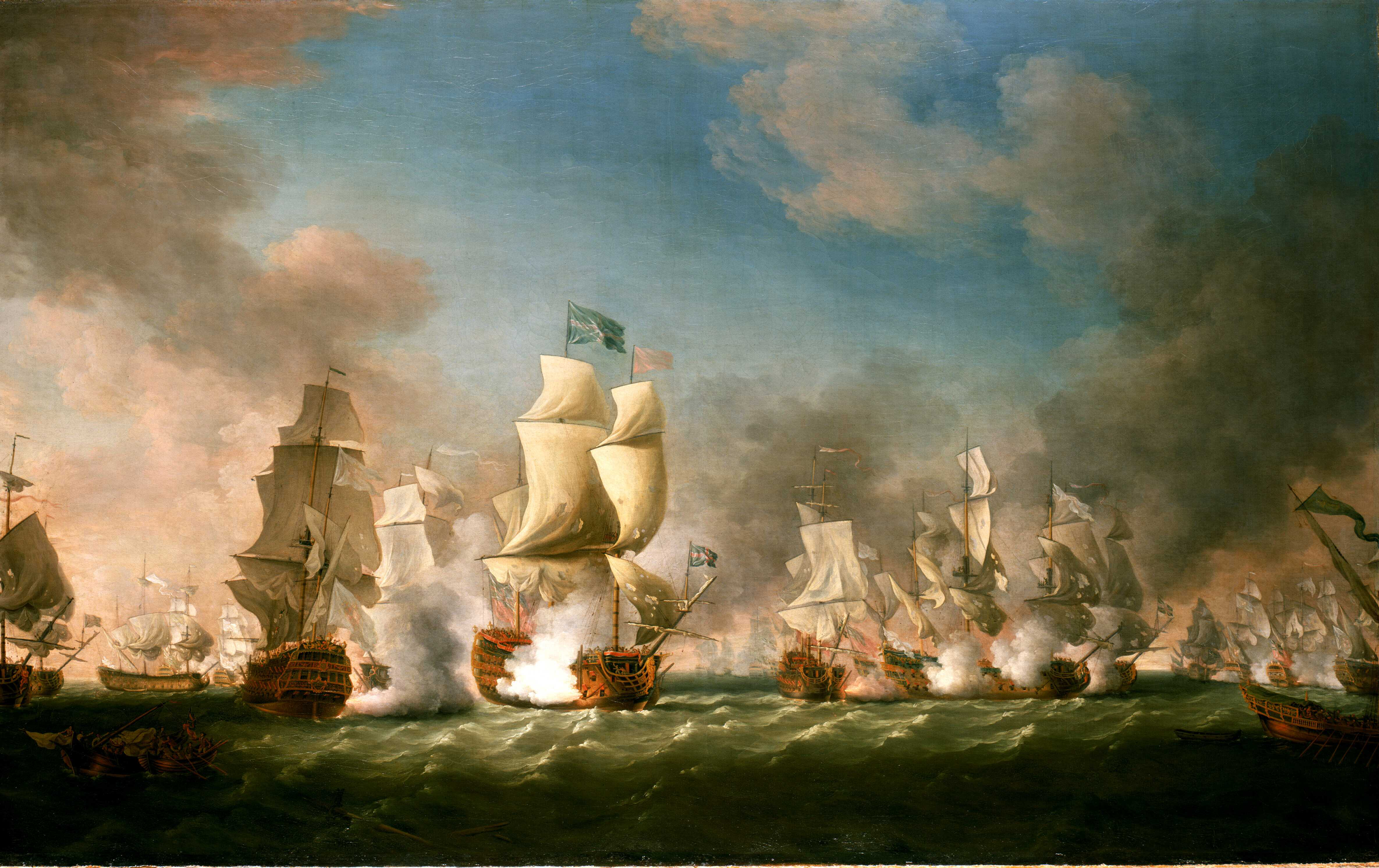
The Battle of Cape Passaro, painted in 1767 by Richard Paton. The action is shown at around 4.00pm and to the right, Superb can be seen raking the Real San Felipe as the Spanish flagship strikes her colours.

On 10 August 1718 the British were off the Calabrian coast when they spotted two vessels, which they presumed to be Spanish scouts. Hoping they would lead to the main fleet, Byng ordered his ships to follow and they located the enemy at around noon. On seeing the British, the Spanish fleet turned away. To prevent losing contact with the enemy during the night, Byng sent his four fastest ships on ahead. HMS Superb, Kent, Grafton and Orford kept up with the Spanish fleet, who were rowing their heaviest ships in the light wind. When dawn broke the following morning, the Spanish discovered the proximity of the British and split their fleet; sending the smaller vessels, store ships, bomb ketches and fire ships towards the shore. In response, Byng sent eight ships in pursuit, including HMS Canterbury and HMS Argyll. Meanwhile Superb, Kent, Grafton and Orford, were ordered to overtake the remaining, larger, Spanish ships, which included Real San Felipe (St Philip the Royal) with Vice-Admiral Castagneta aboard. At around 1300hrs, Superb engaged the enemy flagship and two others, and a running battle ensued. After two hours Kent joined the fight and Superb was able to force the Spanish admiral to surrender. In total, 17 Spanish ships were either taken or destroyed by the British fleet.

=== Later career ===
On 3 April 1719, HMS Superb and HMS Dragon (previously HMS Ormonde), then in Menorca, were sent by Admiral Byng to join Captain Cavendish, who was charged with making peace with the Moors. While en route to rejoin Byng at Naples in August 1719 HMS Superb captured an 8-gun Spanish privateer.

In April 1720, Superb was sent back to Woolwich for substantial repairs and subsequently served under Captain Arthur Field as a guard ship at Sheerness and then at Chatham. She was fitted out at Portsmouth before being sent to the West Indies in 1725, where she later joined Admiral Francis Hosier's fleet and during the Anglo-Spanish War took part in the unsuccessful blockade of Porto Bello. In 1726 Commander, later Captain, John Price took command. He died in December 1727. Captain Edward St Lo succeeded Price, initially just as captain of the ship but then also as commodore of the squadron, but St Lo also died while in command, on 22 April 1729. Captain Peter Solgard took over and Superb returned to home waters at the end of hostilities, where she remained for the rest of her career.

== Fate ==
Superb was taken to Woolwich in October 1732 to be rebuilt or repaired, but was instead broken up there in September 1733. The name Superb was given to a new ship, the larger but lower-rated 60-gun HMS Superb, launched in 1736. This ship served in the Mediterranean for much of her career but also took part in the capture of Louisburg in 1745.

== See also ==
- List of ships captured in the 18th century

== Notes ==
Differences between dates quoted in text and the London Gazette are due to the adoption of the Gregorian calendar in 1752.
