= HMS Ormonde (1711) =

Ship of the line of the Royal Navy

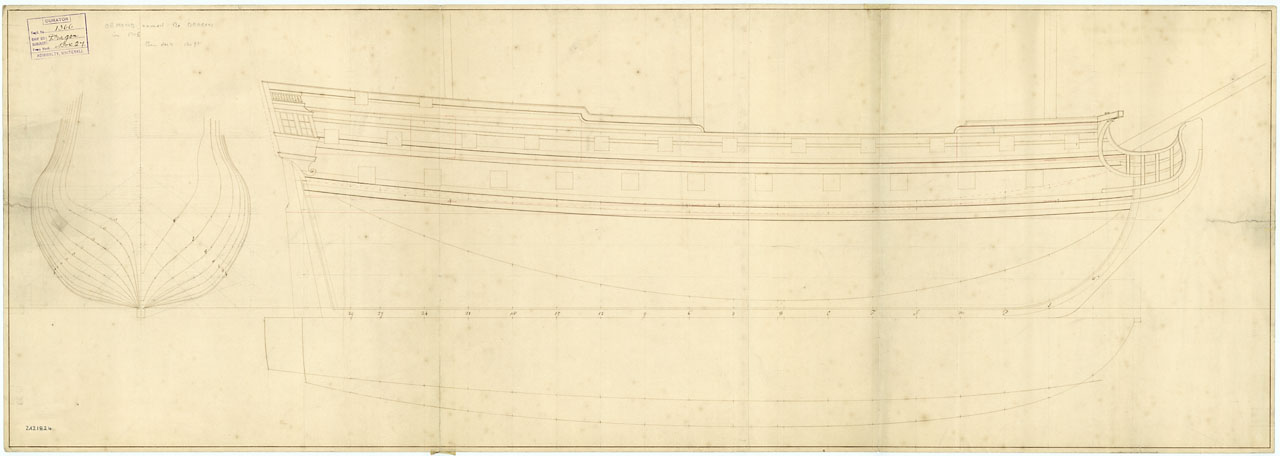
- Ormonde

History

Great Britain
- Name: HMS Ormonde
- Namesake: James Butler, 2nd Duke of Ormonde, ship renamed on his fall from grace
- Builder: Ackworth, Woolwich Dockyard
- Launched: 18 October 1711
- Fate: Broken up, 1733

General characteristics
- Class & type: 1706 Establishment 50-gun fourth rate ship of the line
- Tons burthen: 703 bm
- Length: 130 ft (39.6 m) (gundeck)
- Beam: 35 ft (10.7 m)
- Depth of hold: 14 ft (4.3 m)
- Propulsion: Sails
- Sail plan: Full-rigged ship
- Armament: 50 guns: Gundeck: 22 × 18-pdrs; Upper gundeck: 22 × 9-pdrs; Quarterdeck: 4 × 6-pdrs; Forecastle: 2 × 6-pdrs

HMS Ormonde was a 50-gun fourth rate ship of the line of the Royal Navy, built at Woolwich Dockyard to the 1706 Establishment of dimensions, and launched on 18 October 1711.

In September 1715, she was renamed Dragon. The next year, commanded by Streynsham Master, she was assigned to the Mediterranean Sea.

In 1717, still under Master, she served with Admiral Byng's force in the Baltic Sea, capturing the Swedish Fildrim on 28 June.

Between 1718 and 1725, now commanded by Thomas Scott, she served mainly off Newfoundland and in the Mediterranean.

In 1726, Dragon was assigned to the West Indies station, where Scott would die 25 September, replaced by Perry Mayne.

In June 1727, still on West Indies station, Mayne in turn was replaced by F. Hume.

Ormonde (Dragon) finished her career in the West Indies, serving until 1733, when she was broken up.
