= Battle of Porto Bello (1739) =

1740 battle of the War of Jenkins' Ear

- Part of the War of Jenkins' Ear
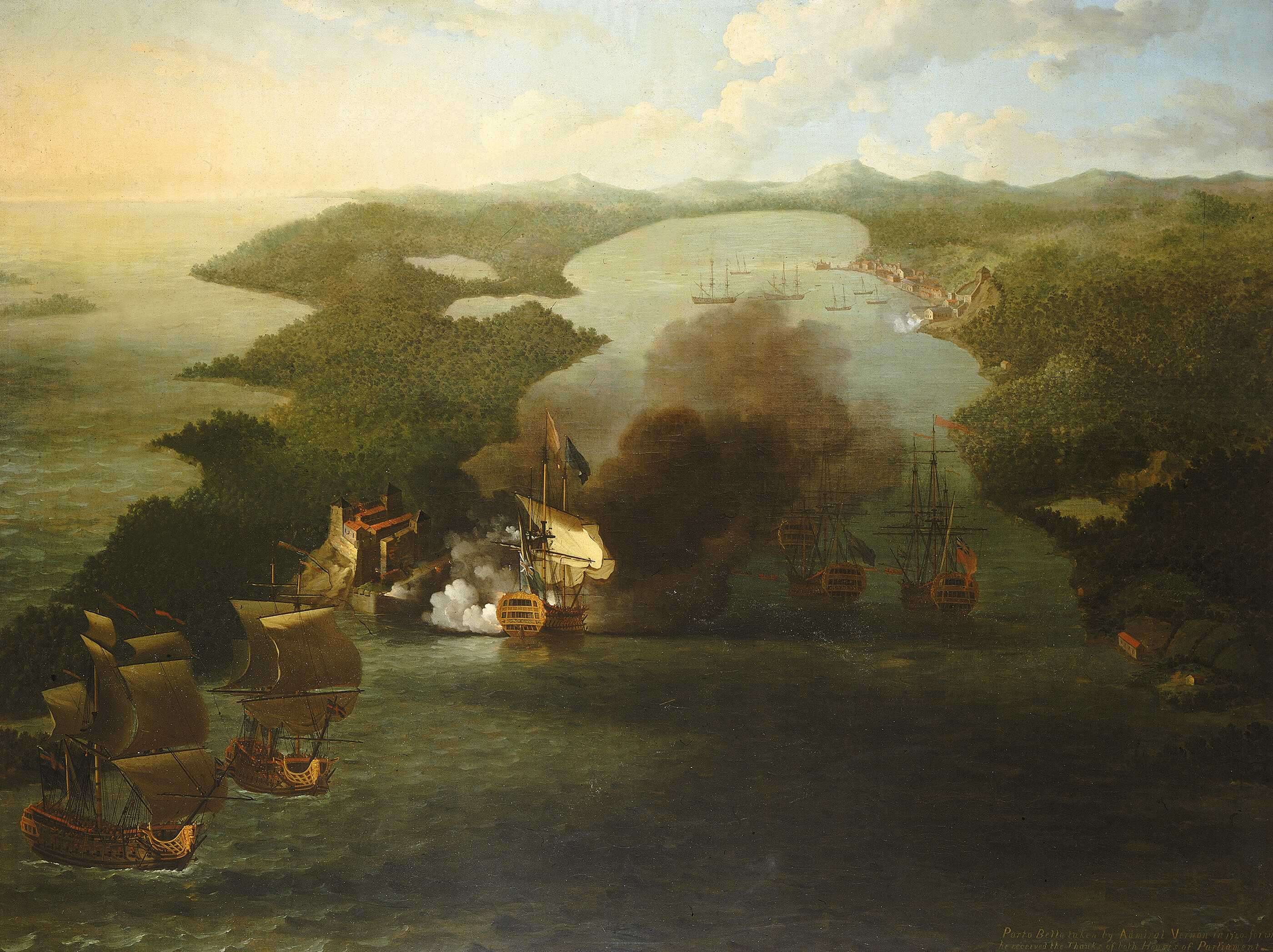
- The Capture of Puerto Bello (1740)
Date	20 November 1739
Location	Portobelo, Panama
Result	British victory

Belligerents
Great Britain	Spain

Commanders and leaders
Edward Vernon	Francisco de la Vega

Strength
6 ships of the line 2 tenders	700; 2 guarda costa vessels 1 sloop 1 snow

Casualties and losses
3 killed 7 wounded	260–300 captured 2 guarda costa vessels captured 1 snow captured 1 sloop sunk

The Battle of Porto Bello (also known as the Battle of Portobello) was a 1739 battle between a Royal Navy squadron aiming to capture the settlement of Portobelo in Panama, and its Spanish defenders. It took place during the War of the Austrian Succession, in the early stages of the war sometimes known as the War of Jenkins' Ear. The battle resulted in a popularly acclaimed British victory.

== Background ==
The settlement of Portobelo was an important port on the Spanish Main. Following the failure of an earlier British naval blockade to prevent a fully laden treasure fleet sailing to Spain from Porto Bello in 1727, an action in which he had taken part, then-Vice Admiral Edward Vernon repeatedly claimed he could capture it with just six ships. Following his appointment to command the Jamaica Station, Vernon organised an expedition with six ships, despite criticism that this was far too few. Vernon was a strong advocate of using small squadrons of powerfully armed warships hitting hard and moving fast rather than larger, slower-moving expeditions that were prone to heavy losses through disease.

== Battle ==
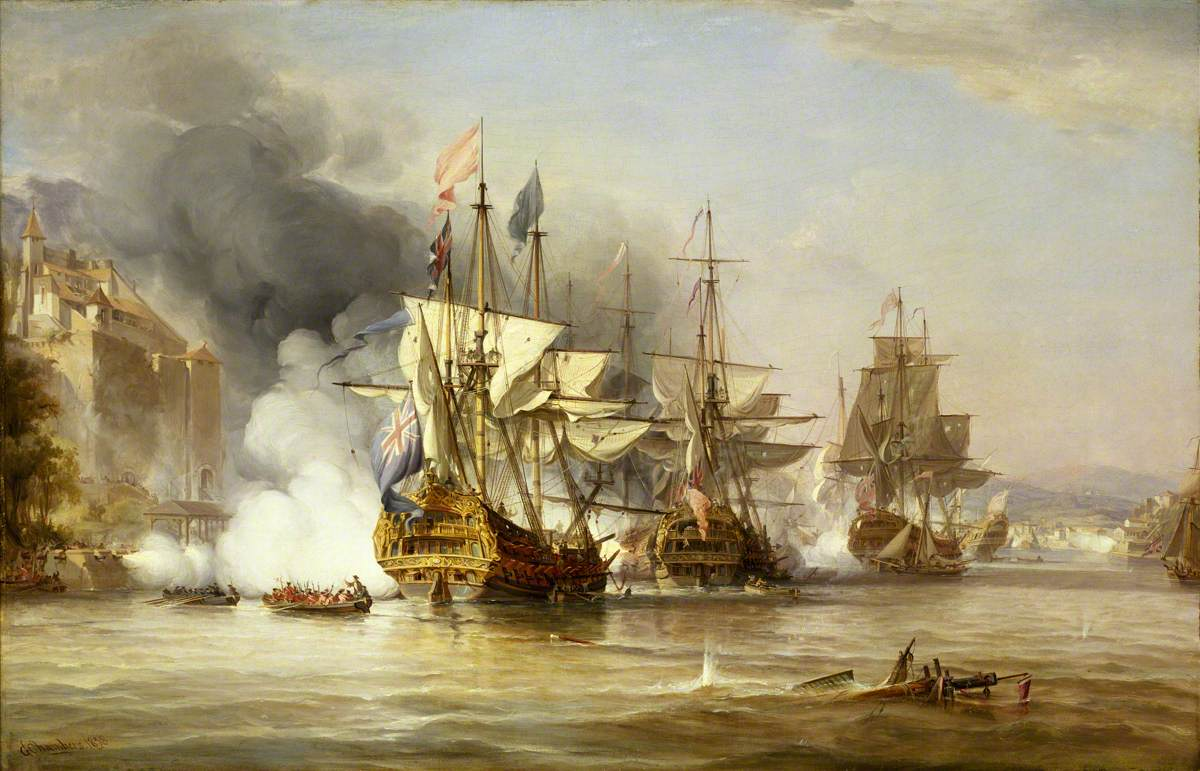
1838 painting of the battle by George Chambers

Vernon's force appeared off Portobelo on 20 November 1739. The British ships entered the bay prepared for a general attack, but a wind coming from the east obliged Vernon to concentrate his ships on the Castillo del Hierro ("Iron Castle"), a harbour fort. The Spanish garrison was caught unprepared. When some Spaniards began to flee from several parts of the fort, several landing parties were sent inshore. The British sailors and marines scaled the walls of the fort, struck the Spanish colours in the lower battery, and hoisted an English ensign. The Spaniards surrendered then at discretion. Of the 300-man Spanish garrison, only 40 soldiers led by Lieutenant Don Juan Francisco Garganta had remained in the fort.

Once he captured Castillo del Hierro, Vernon shifted his ships against Santiago Fortress, sinking a Spanish sloop and causing other damage. At dawn on the following morning, the Spaniards requested terms. Governor Francisco Javier Martínez de la Vega y Retes surrendered in the afternoon. Portobelo was occupied by the British at the cost of three killed and seven wounded. Three prizes were taken: an armed snow, which was renamed Triumph, and two 20-gun guarda costas. The British occupied the town for three weeks, destroying the fortress and other key buildings, and ending the settlement's main function as a major Spanish maritime base, before withdrawing.

== Legacy ==
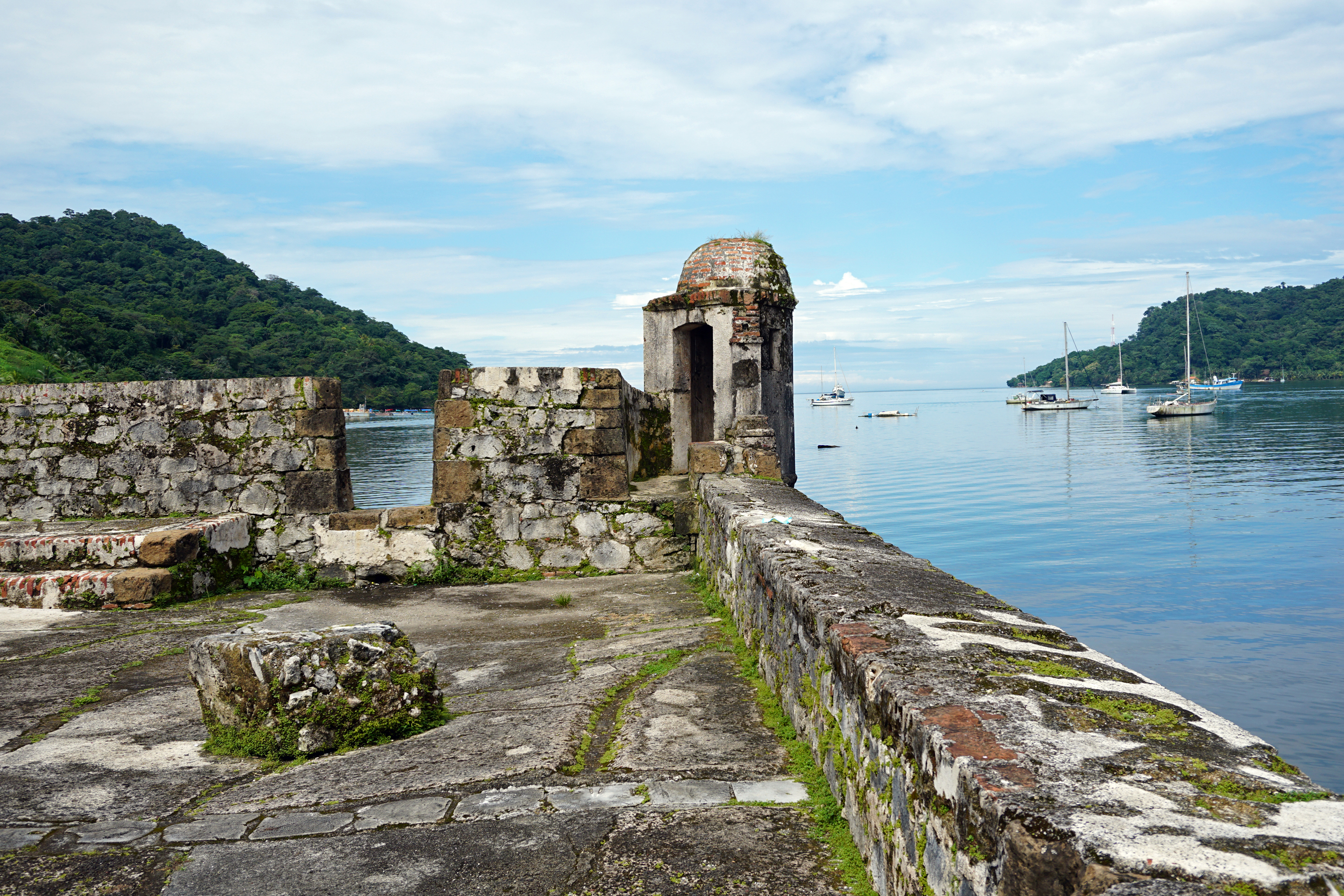
Ruins of the fortress of San Jeronimo, Portobelo.

The capture of Porto Bello was welcomed as a triumph throughout Britain and America, and the name of Portobelo came to be used in commemoration at a variety of locations, such as the Portobello Road in London, the Portobello district of Edinburgh and also in Dublin; as well as Porto Bello in Virginia and Porto Bello in St. Mary's County, Maryland. The victory was particularly well received in the North-American British colonies, where the Spanish had been preying on British shipping.

Vernon became a popular hero in the wake of the victory and was promoted to the rank of admiral. He had been one of the advocates of a more belligerent approach towards Britain's enemies even prior to this expedition, and after the victory, British Prime Minister Robert Walpole was under great pressure by the Opposition to launch similar raids along the Spanish coast. Vernon's next battle in this campaign, a large-scale invasion of Cartagena in 1741, ended in defeat.

Lawrence Washington, the older brother of George Washington, served under Vernon in the Battle of Cartagena de Indias. After he inherited his family's land at Little Hunting Creek, he renamed it Mount Vernon in honour of his wartime commander. When George Washington inherited the plantation upon Lawrence's death, he kept the name.

== British order of battle ==
Ship	Guns	Commander	Ref.
Hampton Court	70	Commodore Charles Brown; Captain Digby Dent	
Norwich	50	Captain Richard Herbert	
Worcester	60	Captain Perry Mayne	
Burford	70	Vice-Admiral Edward Vernon; Captain Thomas Watson	
Strafford	60	Captain Thomas Trevor	
Princess Louisa	60	Captain Thomas Waterhouse	
